= Adams Musical Instruments =

Musical instrument manufacturer

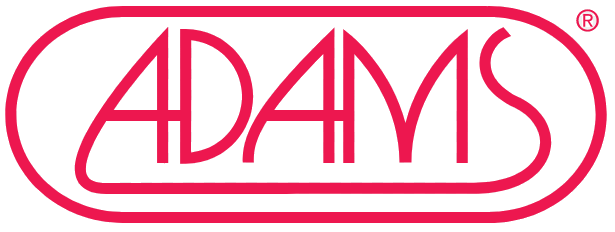
- Industry: Musical instruments
- Founded: 1970
- Founder: André Adams
- Headquarters: Ittervoort, Limburg, Netherlands
- Products: Percussion and brass instruments
- Owner: Frans Swinkels
- Number of employees: 160 (2026)
- Website: adams-music.com

Adams Musical Instruments is a manufacturer of musical instruments based in the Netherlands. The company produces percussion and brass instruments.

Percussion instruments by Adams include timpani, marimbas, xylophones, vibraphones, glockenspiels, bar chimes, bass drums, bell plates, temple blocks and drum hardware, while range of brass instruments include trumpets, flugelhorns, cornets, trombones, euphoniums, and tubas.

== History ==
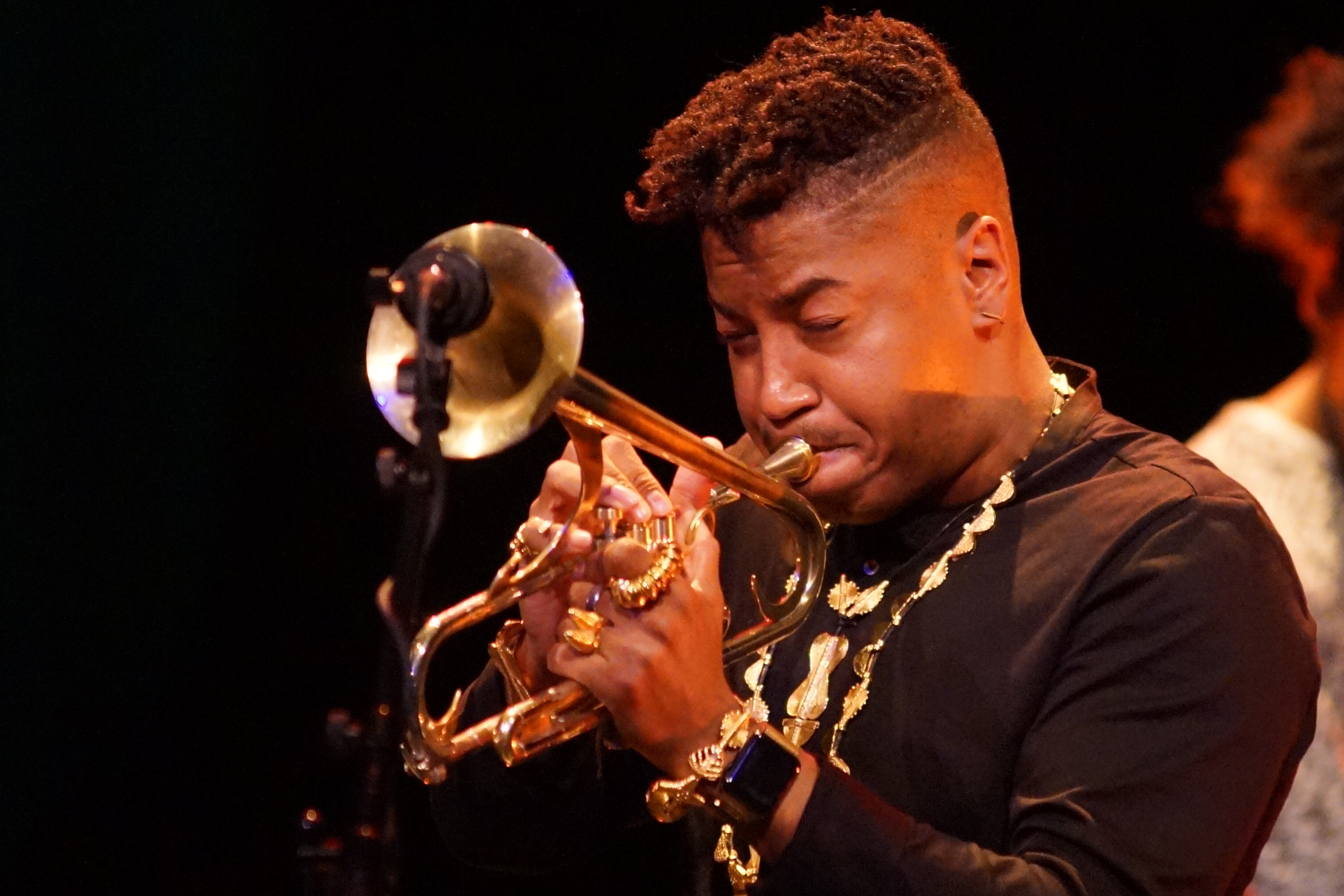
Chief Xian aTunde Adjuah with his Adams trumpet

André Adams, founder of the company, started repairing brass instruments in 1970. Music was his hobby, and engineering was his passion. After gaining experience as an instrument maker with various well-known firms throughout Europe, his unique background led to the emergence of one of the world’s largest manufacturers of percussion- and brass instruments.

=== Origins in Thorn ===
The roots of Adams lie in Thorn, a former principality of the Holy Roman Empire. André Adams, born on 3 March 1945, grew up in a musical family in Thorn and played trumpet in the local wind band, Harmonie St. Michaël van Thorn. During his military service he obtained a professional diploma in instrument making.

=== Early workshop (1965–1973) ===
After completing his training, André Adams worked as a repairer in his brother's music shop in Weert, while converting a shed behind his parents' house in Thorn into a workshop in the evenings. The business was registered with the Dutch Chamber of Commerce in 1970 under the name Muziekcentrale Adams, and initial development of in-house timpani began around the same period. A shop with living quarters opened on the Casino square in Thorn in 1973.

=== Cross-border growth (1974–1979) ===
A production warehouse of approximately 500 m² was built at the De Akker industrial estate in Thorn in 1975. A branch opened in Hasselt, Belgium, in 1976, serving the Belgian wind band and fanfare market, and the brand name "Big Sound" was introduced for the company's timpani. In the late 1970s, the company expanded its trade in used instruments to the United States, later also establishing contacts in Japan.

=== International expansion and professionalisation (1980–2001) ===
The Belgian branch relocated from Hasselt to Diest for additional space. Frans Swinkels joined the company in 1987 and contributed to the development of mallet instruments. The Adams Percussion Centre opened next to the factory at the De Akker industrial estate in 1989, and a new factory hall was built in Ittervoort in 1997. Frans Swinkels was appointed director in 2001, and operations relocated from Thorn to Ittervoort.

=== Development of Adams Brass (2002–2009) ===
Initial experiments in manufacturing brass instrument components began within the repair department in 2004. In 2006, all company activities were consolidated at the Ittervoort site, and the first in-house brass instrument was completed in 2007, leading to the establishment of Adams Brass as a dedicated division. In 2006, Adams (trading at the time as Adams Paukenfabriek) won the inaugural Limburg Export Award, established that year by the Exportsociëteit Limburg. According to L1, the company reported turnover of €11 million in 2005, of which 98% was generated abroad, with exports to the entire European Union and 42 other countries, and employed 55 people at the time.

=== Global expansion (2010–2019) ===
In 2010, Adams Musical Instruments won the Koning Willem I Prize in the SME (MKB) category. A new dispatch hall was completed in Ittervoort in 2015, bringing the total site area to more than 35,000 m². The Belgian operation relocated to a new building in Lummen in January 2018, described in regional press coverage as the largest music shop in the country; the opening was marked with a demonstration by Clouseau drummer Herman Cambré.

=== Present ===
The company today consists of three divisions: Adams Music Centre, Adams Brass, and Adams Percussion. It remains an independent, family-owned business with no external investors, with a third generation of the family now active in the organisation.

== Location ==
The instrument factories and headquarters of the company are based in Ittervoort, Netherlands. In the same building Adams has a huge music shop for woodwind, brasswind, drums and percussion. In Lummen (Belgium) the company has another music shop. Both stores have a specialised repair department. The instruments are sold worldwide via dealers and distributors. In the US through Pearl Drums for instance. A notable dealer of Adams trumpets and flugel horns in the US is J. Landress Brass.
