= Margriet Herroes =

Dutch victim of a witch trial

- Died: 15 October 1551; Borgloon, Habsburg Netherlands
- Known for: Victim of witch trials

Margriet Herroes (died 15 October 1551) was a Dutch (Flemish) woman who became a victim of a witch trial in Borgloon in the Duchy of Limburg. Her case is notable for the extreme torture she endured without confessing to witchcraft.

== Biography ==
In August 1551, the bailiff of Grathem accused Herroes of witchcraft. The trial was conducted by the drossaard (a judicial officer) of Grathem, who interrogated 421 witnesses during the proceedings. Herroes was subjected to severe torture techniques, including being bound to a ladder and placed on the rack (known as 'duivengaten'). On 6 August, she was tied to the ladder twice and tortured in the public square. However, she withstood the torture and didn't admit to being a witch. The next day, she was tortured again, but still did not speak. Severely weakened by the torture, Herroes was locked in an attic and left to her fate. A month later, she was tortured again until she collapsed unconscious. On 15 October Margriet was tortured once more. Because the ladder torture did not produce the desired result, she was made to wear sheepskin shoes. It is likely that the bound Herroes was placed near a fire, causing her legs and feet to burn inside the glowing footwear. Still, the woman said nothing. The aldermen brought her back to the attic. That night, the desperate Herroes committed suicide by cutting her throat.
