= Hunsel =

- Village
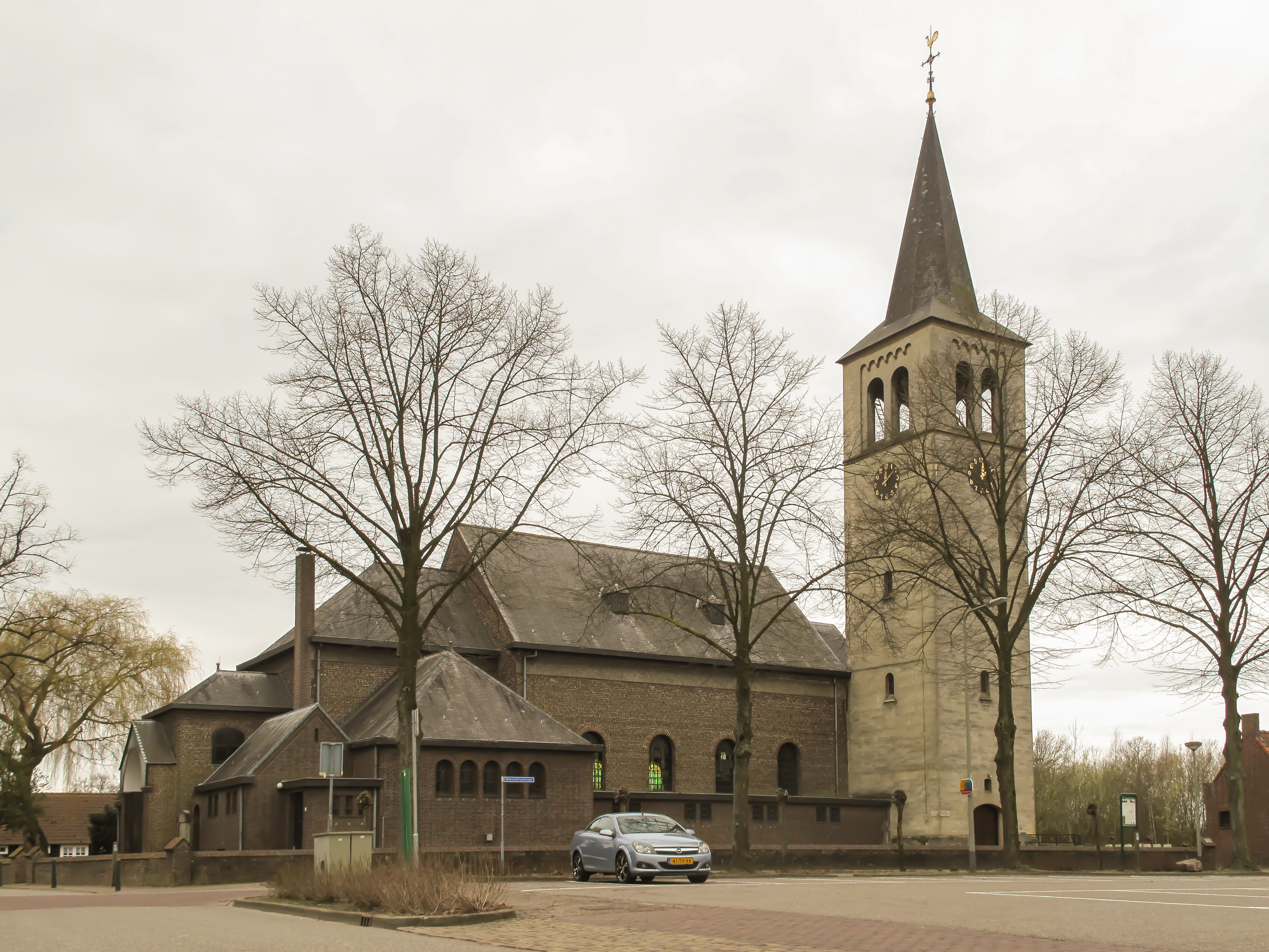
- The St Jacobus Church

- Coat of arms

- Location in the Netherlands Location in the province of Limburg in the Netherlands
- Coordinates: 51°11′N 5°49′E
- Country: Netherlands
- Province: Limburg
- Municipality: Leudal

Area
  - Total: 7.00 km^{2} (2.70 sq mi)
- Elevation: 29 m (95 ft)

Population (2021)
  - Total: 950
  - Density: 140/km^{2} (350/sq mi)
- Time zone: UTC+1 (CET)
  - Summer (DST): UTC+2 (CEST)
- Postal code: 6013
- Dialing code: 0475
- Major roads: A2

Hunsel (Dutch pronunciation: [ˈɦʏnsəl]) is a village in the south-eastern Netherlands.

== History ==
The village was first mentioned in 1400 as Hunsel. The etymology is unclear. Hunsel developed along the Uffelse beek.

The Catholic St Jacobus de Meerdere is a single aisled church with the tower on the side. The tower dates from around 1300. In 1839, was built next to the tower. Between 1925 and 1926, it was expanded by Joseph Cuypers. In 1944, the tower was blown up. The damage to the church was repaired in 1946, and in 1955, a new tower was built according to the old design.

The watermill Uffelse Molen is a grist mill from around 1800. In 1961, it went out of service. In 2008, it was restored.

Hunsel was home to 236 people in 1840. Until it became a part of Leudal on 1 January 2007, Hunsel was a separate municipality, covering also the villages of Ell, Haler, Ittervoort and Neeritter

Hunsel had its own football club, RKHVC. It had been founded in 1943. On July 1, 2020, RKHVC merged with VV GKC (from Grathem and Kelpen-Oler) and RKESV (from Ell) to form DFO '20.

== Born in Hunsel ==
- Antonius Bouwens (1876–1963), Dutch sport shooter who won a bronze medal at the Summer Olympics

== Gallery ==
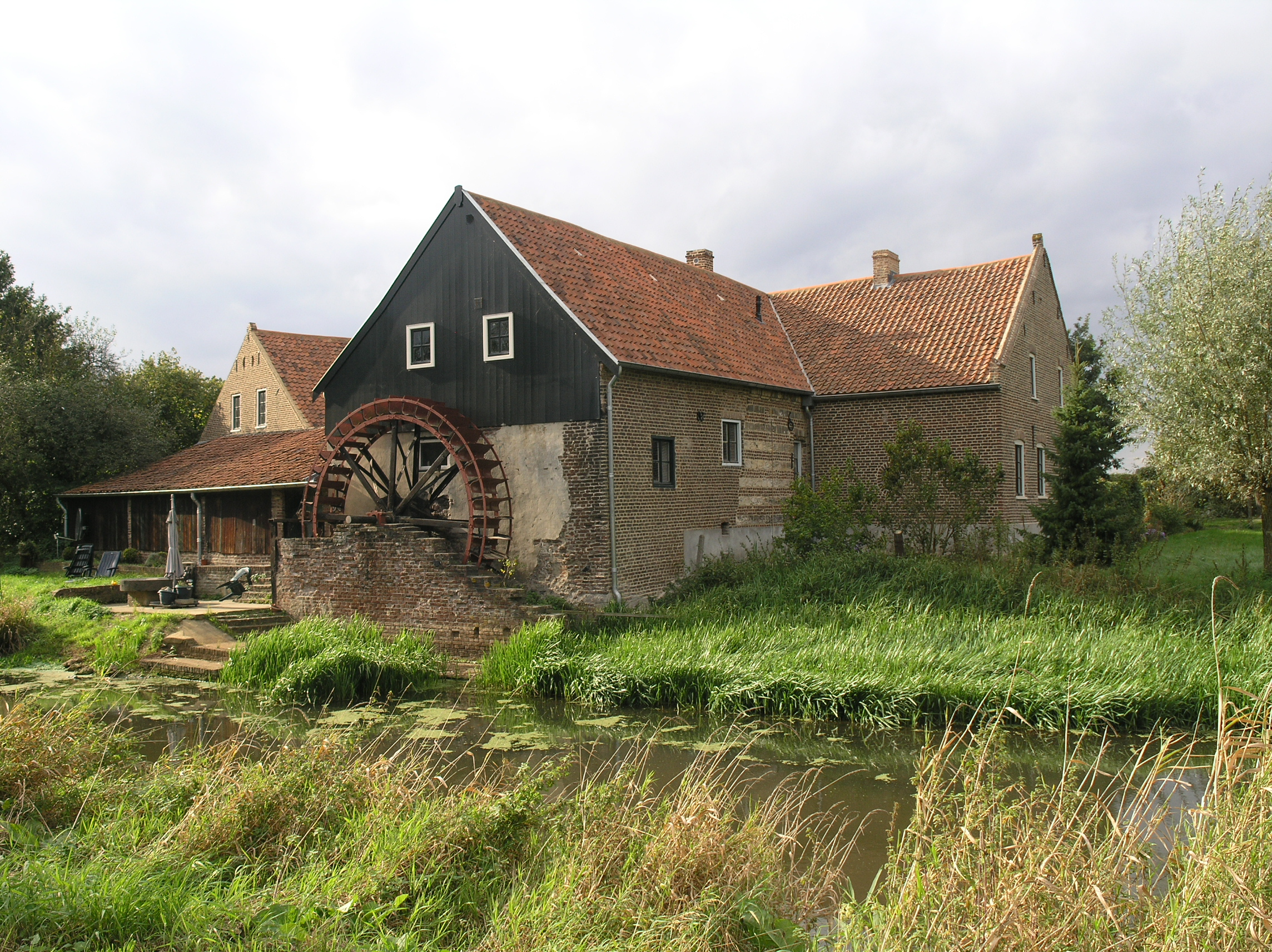
Watermill Uffelsemolen

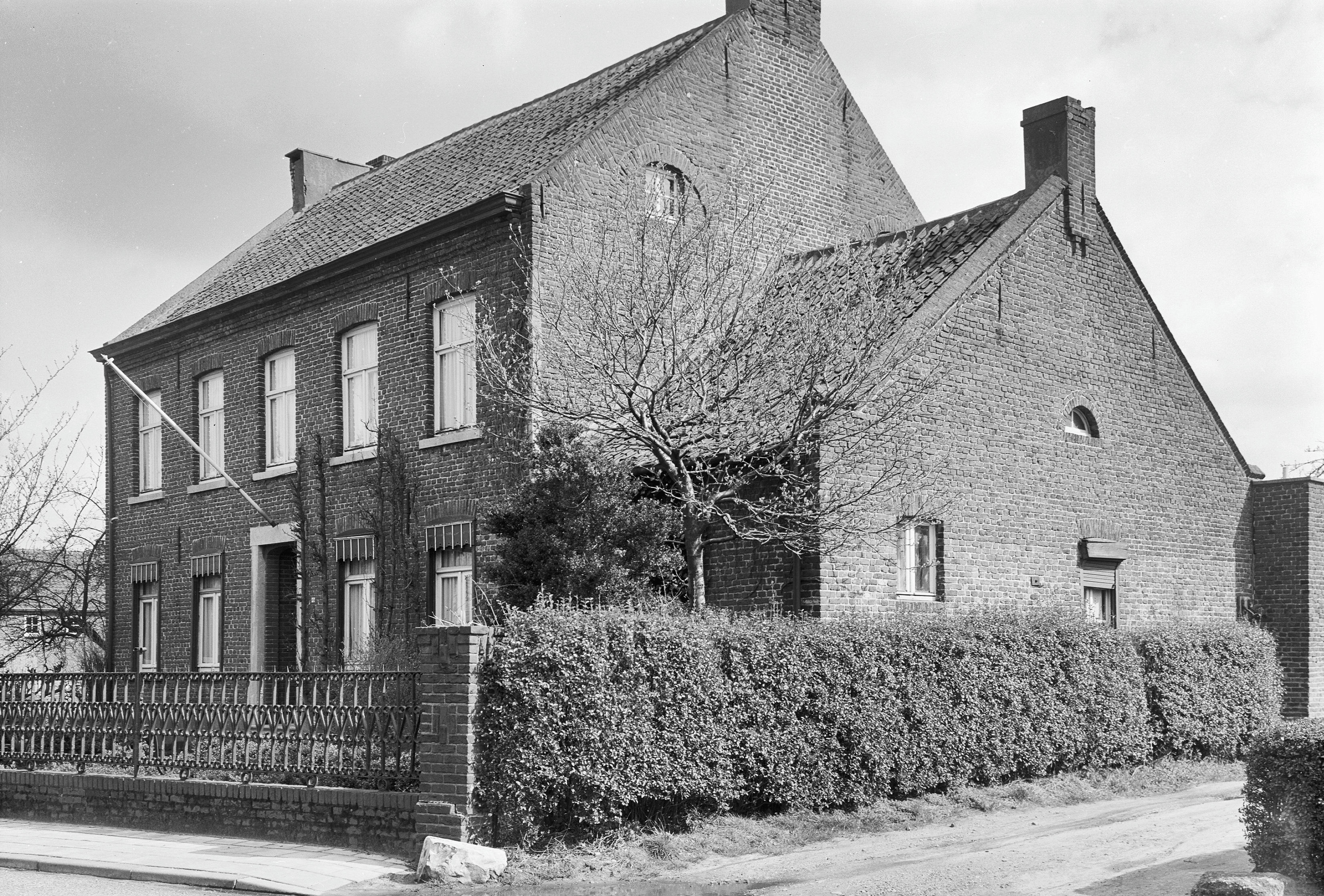
House in Hunsel
