= 1485 AM =

AM radio frequency

Copies of the World Radio TV Handbook (including the 1991 edition) have identified 1485 kHz as a local frequency, akin to the Class C (former Class IV) radio stations in North America which are limited to 1kW.

The following radio stations broadcast on AM frequency 1485 kHz:

== Italy ==
- Broadcast Italia: Rome (C-QUAM AM stereo)

== Netherlands ==
- "Dreamradio AM" at Baexem (C-QUAM AM stereo)
