= Roggel en Neer =

Coordinates: 51°15′48″N 5°55′23″E

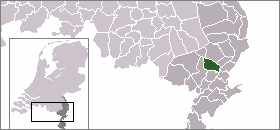
Former municipality of Roggel en Neer in Limburg.

Roggel en Neer (Dutch pronunciation: [ˈrɔɣəl ɛ(n) ˈneːr]) is a former municipality in the Dutch province of Limburg. It covered the villages of Roggel, Neer, and Heibloem. Since January 1, 2007, the area has been a part of the new municipality of Leudal.

Roggel en Neer is the renaming of the municipality of Roggel in 1993.
