= Leudal =

Leudal Leudaal (Limburgish)
- Municipality
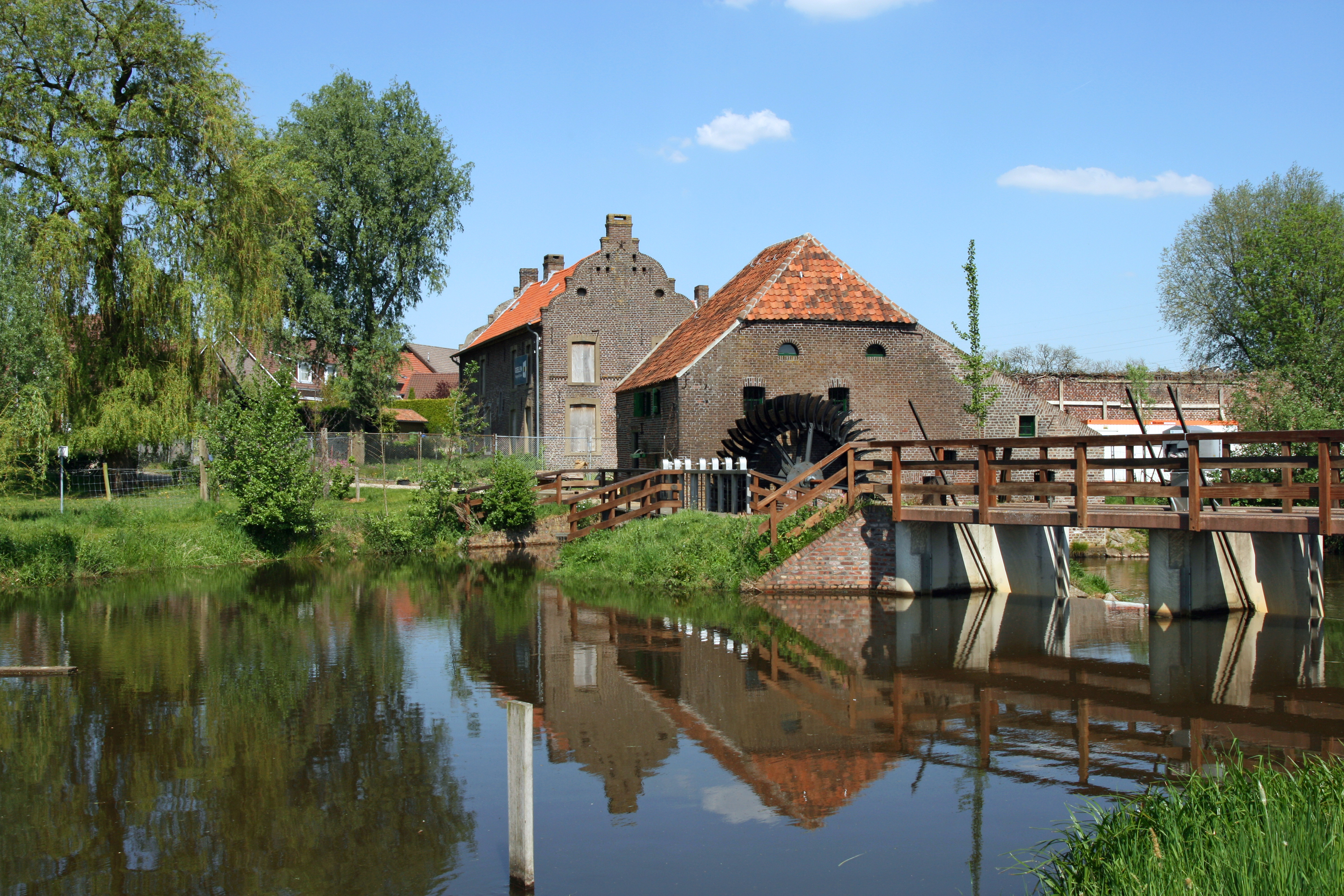
- Water mill Friedesse in Neer

- Flag Coat of arms

- Location in Limburg
- Coordinates: 51°15′N 5°54′E
- Country: Netherlands
- Province: Limburg
- Established: 1 January 2007

Government
  - Body: Municipal council
  - Mayor: Désirée Schmalschläger (GroenLinks)

Area
  - Total: 164.91 km^{2} (63.67 sq mi)
  - Land: 162.73 km^{2} (62.83 sq mi)
  - Water: 2.18 km^{2} (0.84 sq mi)
- Elevation: 28 m (92 ft)

Population (January 2021)
  - Total: 36,045
  - Density: 222/km^{2} (570/sq mi)
- Time zone: UTC+1 (CET)
  - Summer (DST): UTC+2 (CEST)
- Postcode: Parts of 6000 range
- Area code: 0475, 0495
- Website: www.leudal.nl

Leudal (Limburgish: Leudaal) is a municipality in the Dutch province of Limburg. It was formed on 1 January 2007 in a merger of the municipalities of Heythuysen, Haelen, Hunsel, and Roggel en Neer.

== Population centres ==
The municipality contains the following population centres:

- Baexem
- Buggenum
- Ell
- Grathem
- Haelen
- Haler
- Heibloem
- Heythuysen
- Horn
- Hunsel
- Ittervoort
- Kelpen-Oler
- Neer
- Neeritter
- Nunhem
- Roggel

== Topography ==
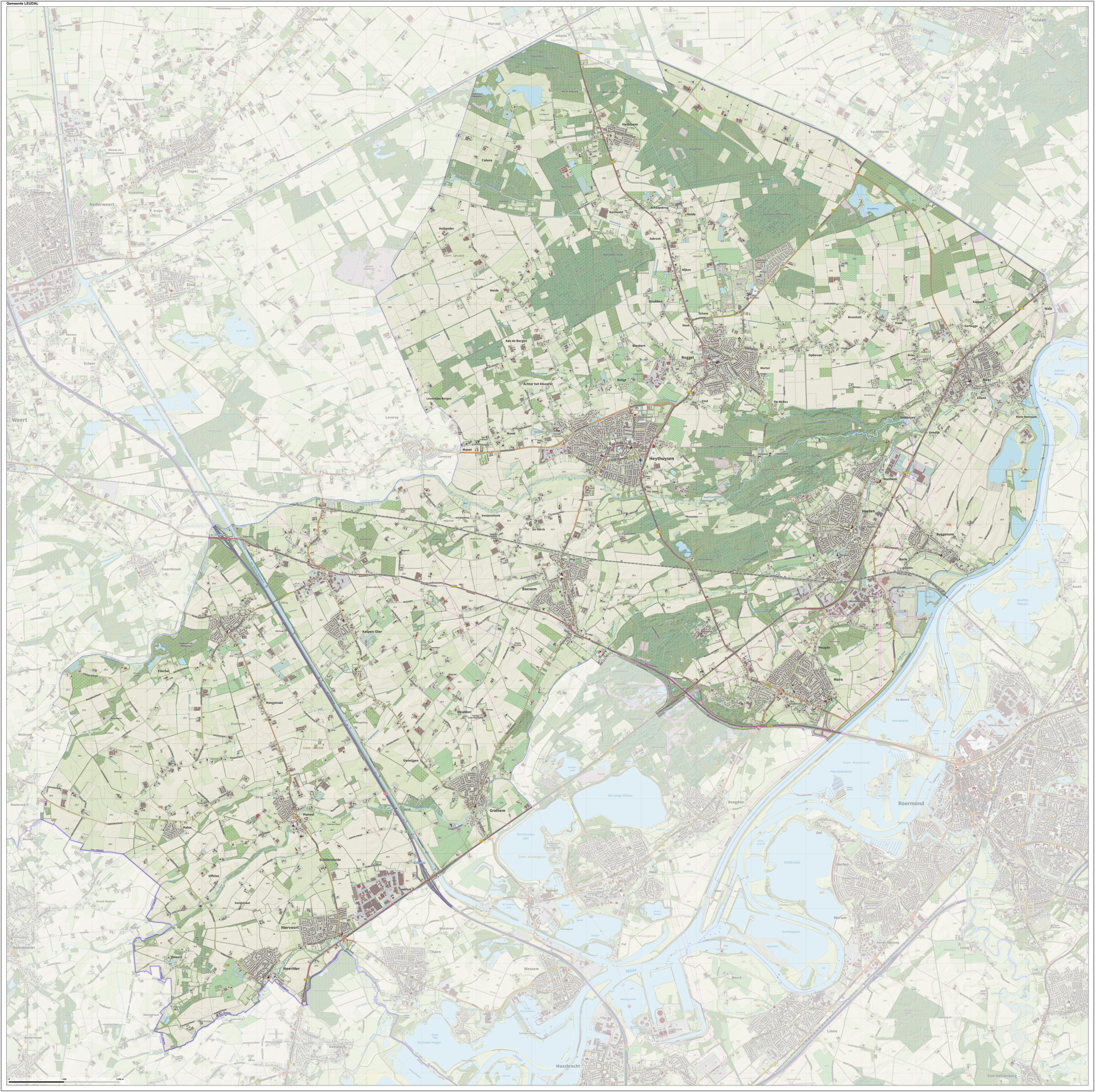

Dutch Topographic map of the municipality of Leudal, June 2015

== Notable people ==
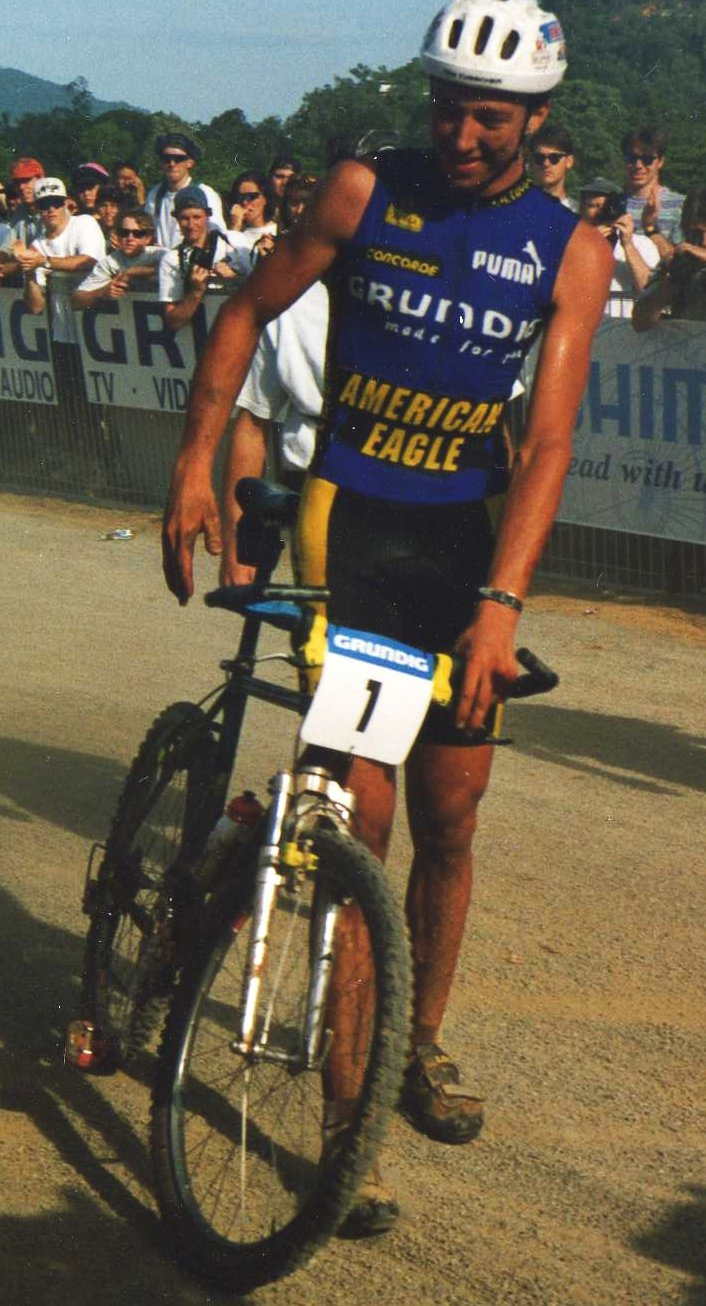
Bart Brentjens, 1994

- Arnold II of Horne (1339 – 1389) Bishop of Utrecht 1371/1378 and Bishop of Liège 1378/1389
- Philip de Montmorency, Count of Horn (ca.1524 – 1568) a victim of the Inquisition in the Spanish Netherlands
- Floris of Montmorency (ca.1528 - 1570) a noble and diplomat from the Spanish Netherlands
- Wilhelmus Demarteau (1917 in Horn – 2012) Bishop in the Roman Catholic Diocese of Banjarmasin, Indonesia
- Peter J. Peters (born 1957 in Hunsel) a professor of nanobiology, works on electron microscopy
- Carool Kersten (born 1964 in Haelen) a historian of Islam, academic and author
- Stevie Ann (born 1986 in Roggel) a Dutch singer-songwriter

=== Sport ===
- Antonius Bouwens (1876 in Hunsel – 1963) a Dutch sports shooter, bronze medallist at the 1900 Summer Olympics
- Peter van de Ven (born 1961 in Hunsel) a former professional footballer with 417 club caps
- Bart Brentjens (born 1968 in Haelen) a Dutch racing cyclist in mountain biking, gold medallist in the 1996 Summer Olympics and bronze medallist in the 2004 Summer Olympics
- Edwin Linssen (born 1980 in Neeritter) a former professional footballer with over 450 club caps
- Bryan Linssen (born 1990 in Neeritter) a Dutch professional footballer, with approaching 300 club caps

== Gallery ==
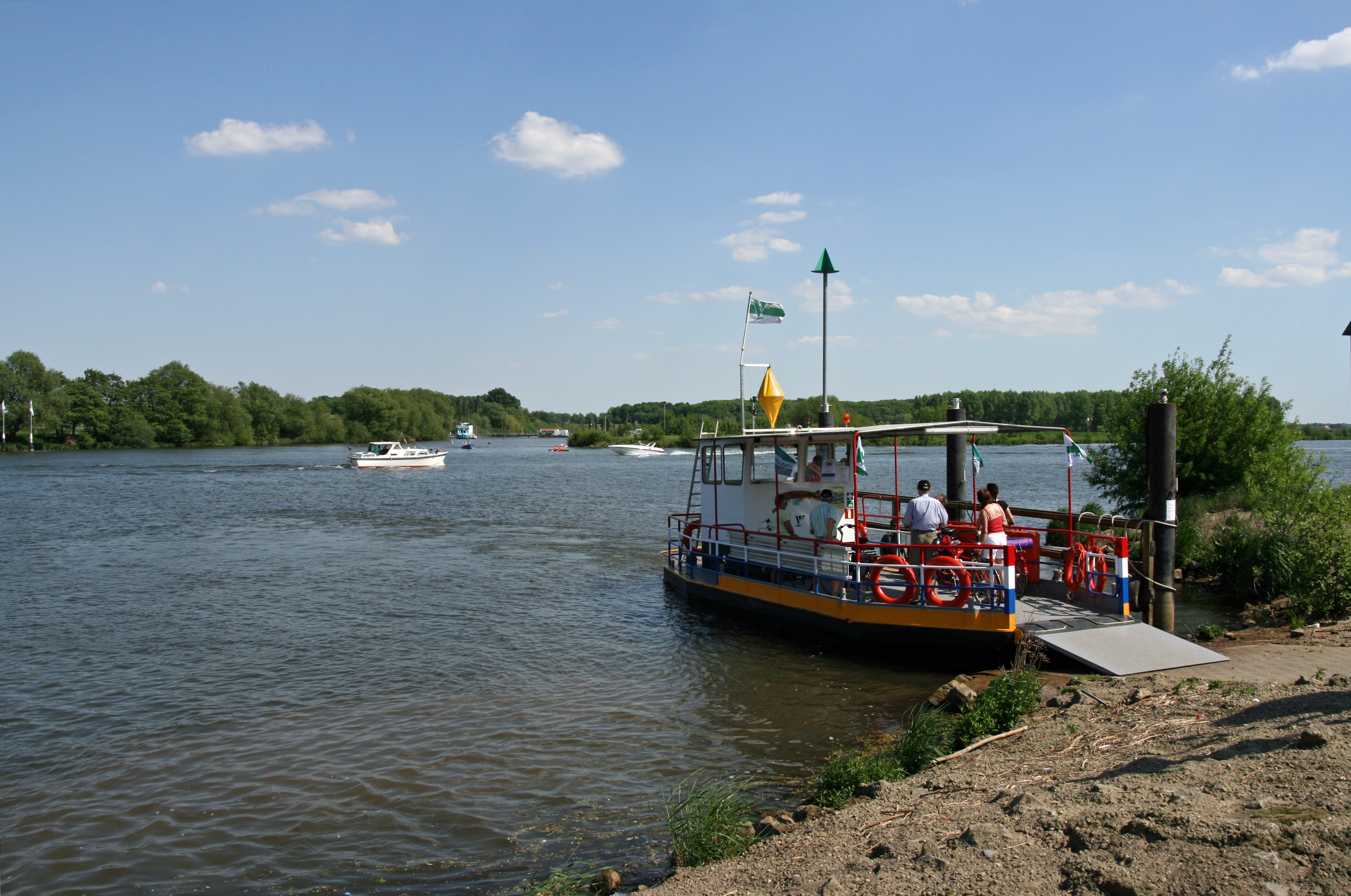
Neer

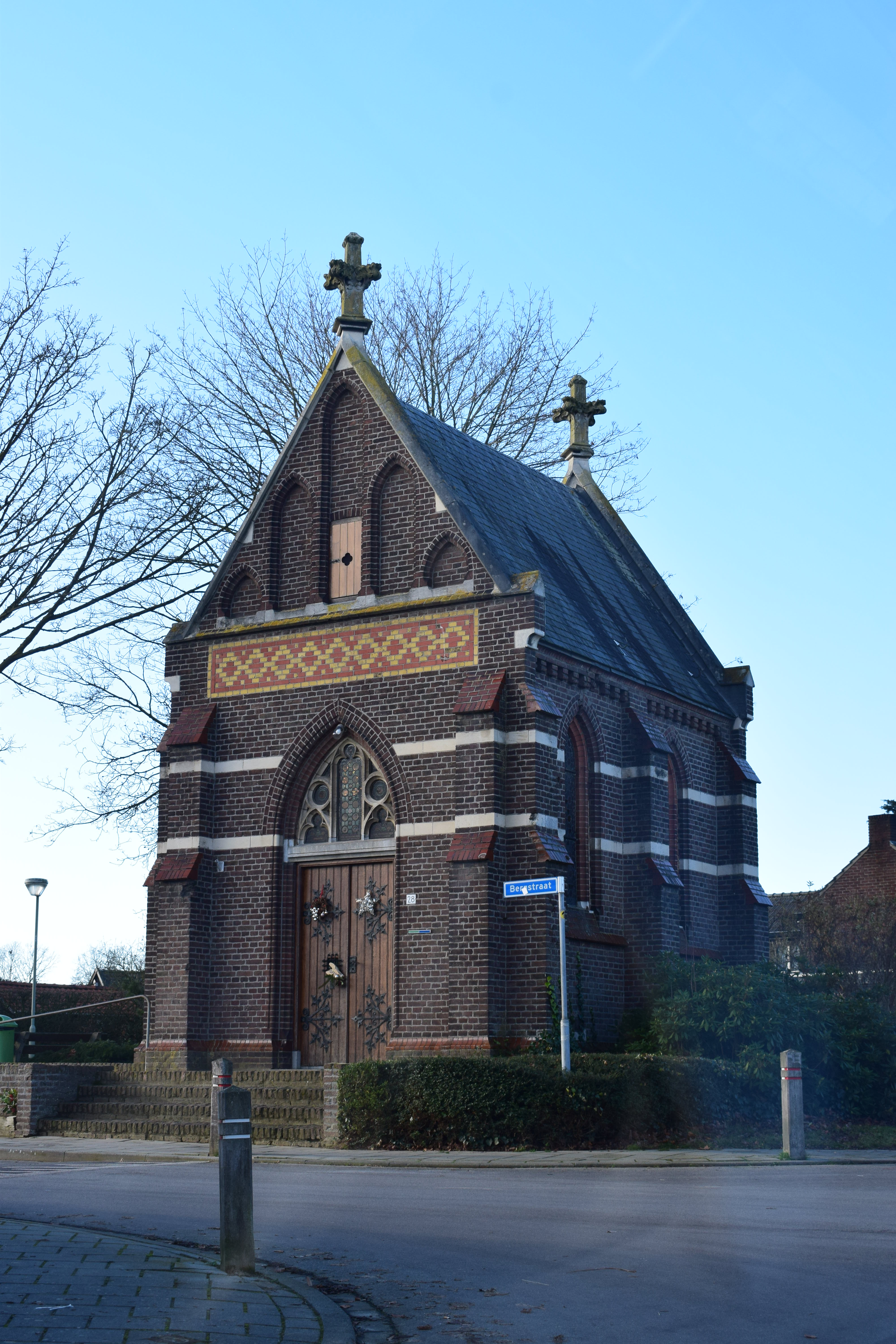
Mariakapel, Bergstraat-Holstraat, Buggenum

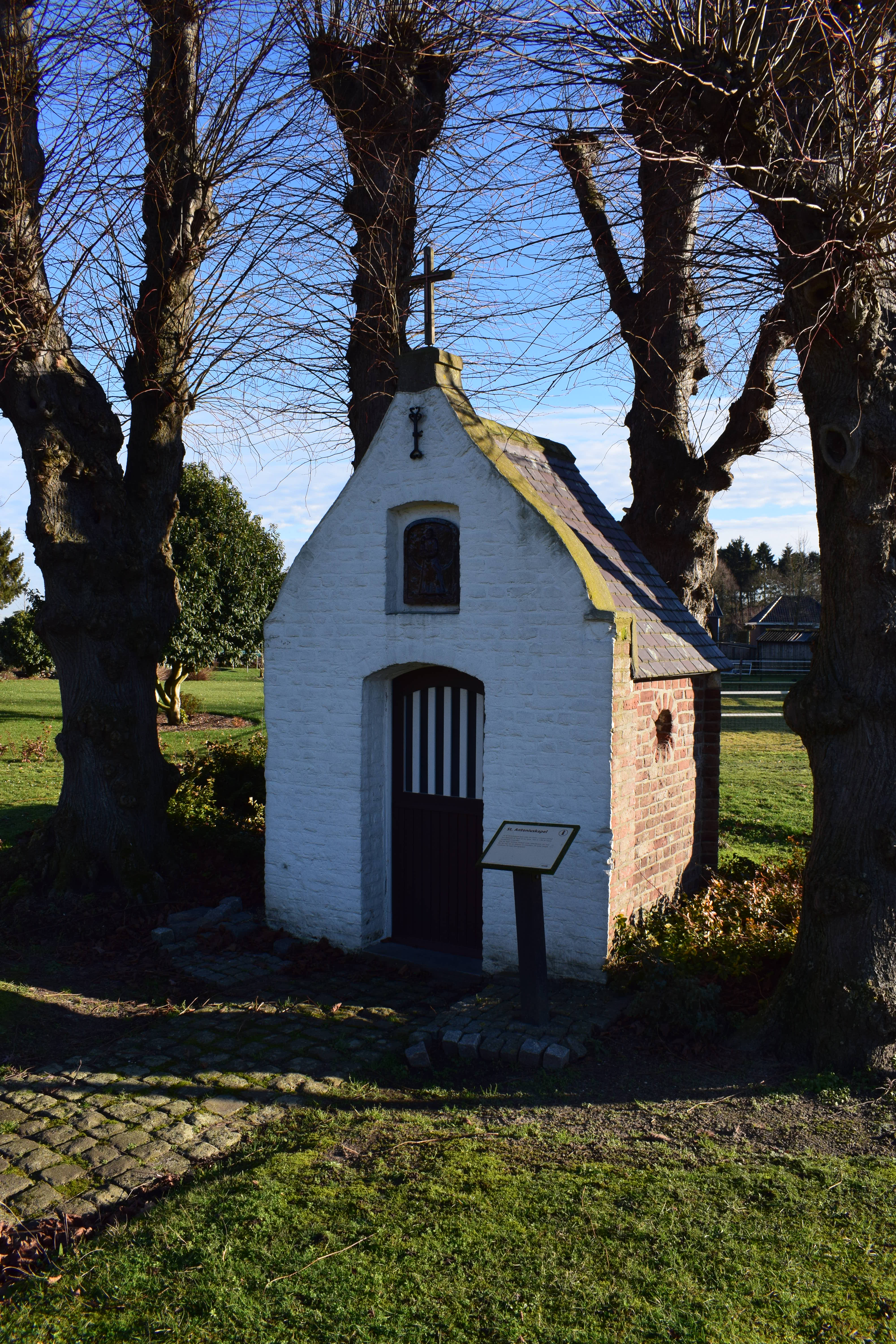
Sint Antoniuskapel, Mortel-Op de Bos, Roggel

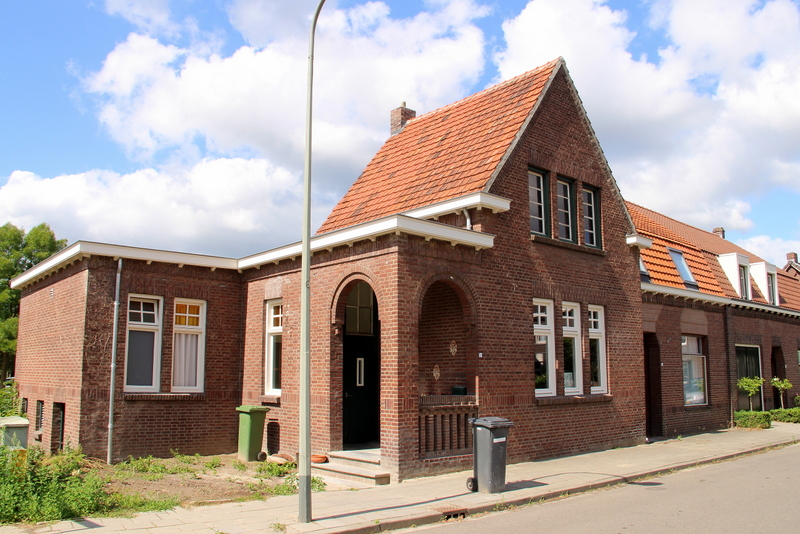
Nunhem - Kerkstraat 11, former townhall
