= Buggenum =

Buggenum Bögkeme (Limburgish)
- Village
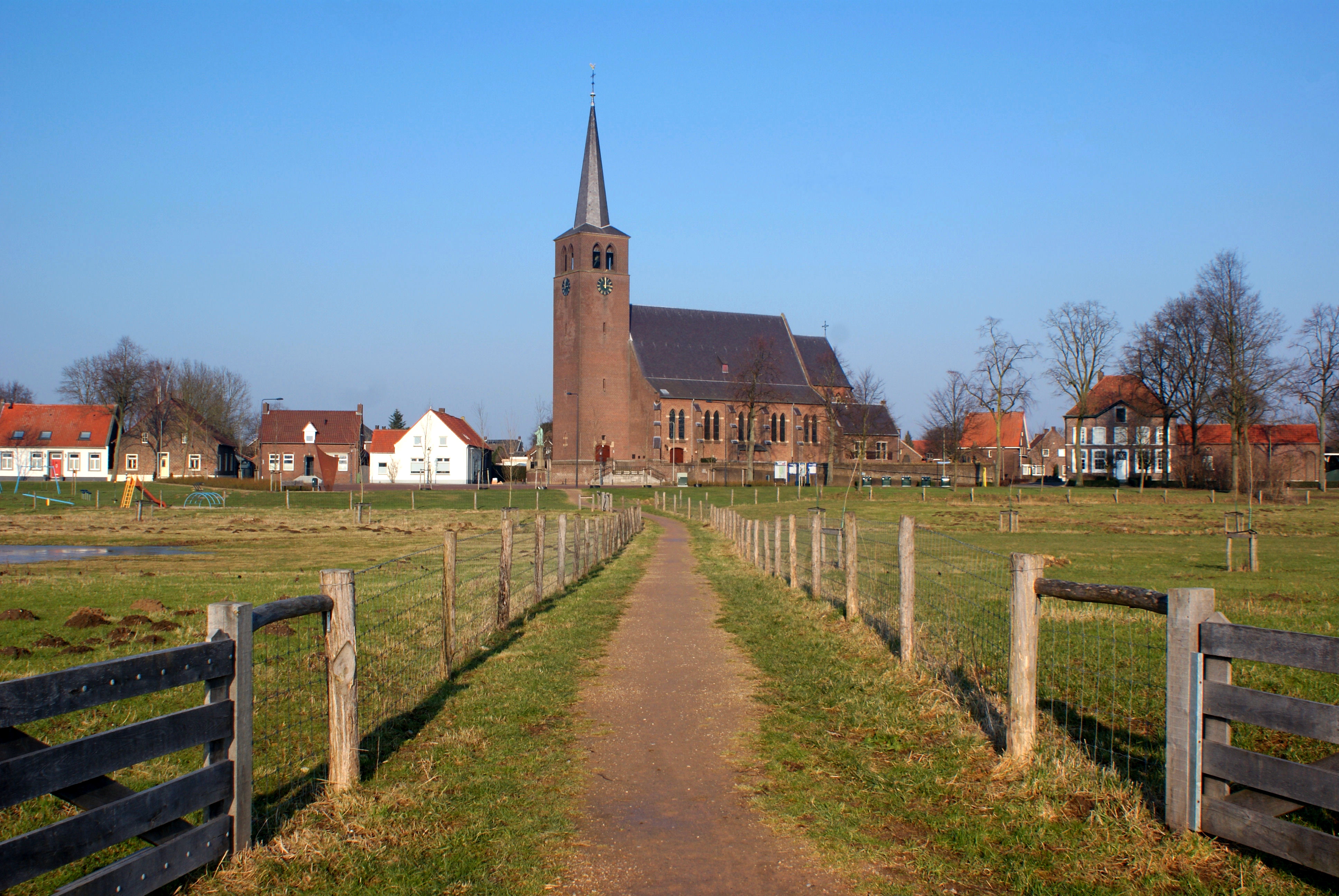
- View on the St Aldegundis Church and the village

- Coat of arms

- Location in the Netherlands Location in the province of Limburg in the Netherlands
- Coordinates: 51°14′N 5°59′E
- Country: Netherlands
- Province: Limburg
- Municipality: Leudal

Area
  - Total: 4.17 km^{2} (1.61 sq mi)
- Elevation: 22 m (72 ft)

Population (2021)
  - Total: 940
  - Density: 230/km^{2} (580/sq mi)
- Time zone: UTC+1 (CET)
  - Summer (DST): UTC+2 (CEST)
- Postal code: 6082
- Dialing code: 0475
- Major roads: N273

Buggenum (Dutch: [ˈbʏɣənʏm]; Limburgish: Bögkeme [ˈbœɡəmə]) is a village in the Dutch province of Limburg. It was a part of the municipality of Haelen until 2007, when it merged into the municipality of Leudal. It lies about 5 km north of Roermond.

== History ==
The village was first mentioned in 1230 as Bugnem, and means "settlement of Buggo (person)". Buggenum developed in the Early Middle Ages along the Maas. It used to be part of the County of Horne and later became part of the Prince-Bishopric of Liège. It became an independent heerlijkheid in 1679. Up to 1949, there was a ferry to Roermond near the village.

The Catholic St Allegundis Church is a three aisled church. The choir still dates from around 1400. The remainder was destroyed in 1944. The current church is Gothic Revival style was built between 1948 and 1949, and a tower was added in 1958.

Malborgh estate is a castle-like building with two corner towers. In 1470, it became owned by the St Elisabeth monastery. In 1798, it became private property and received its current shape in 1830.

Buggenum was home to 668 people in 1840. Buggenum was a separate municipality until 1942, when it was merged with Haelen.

== Gallery ==
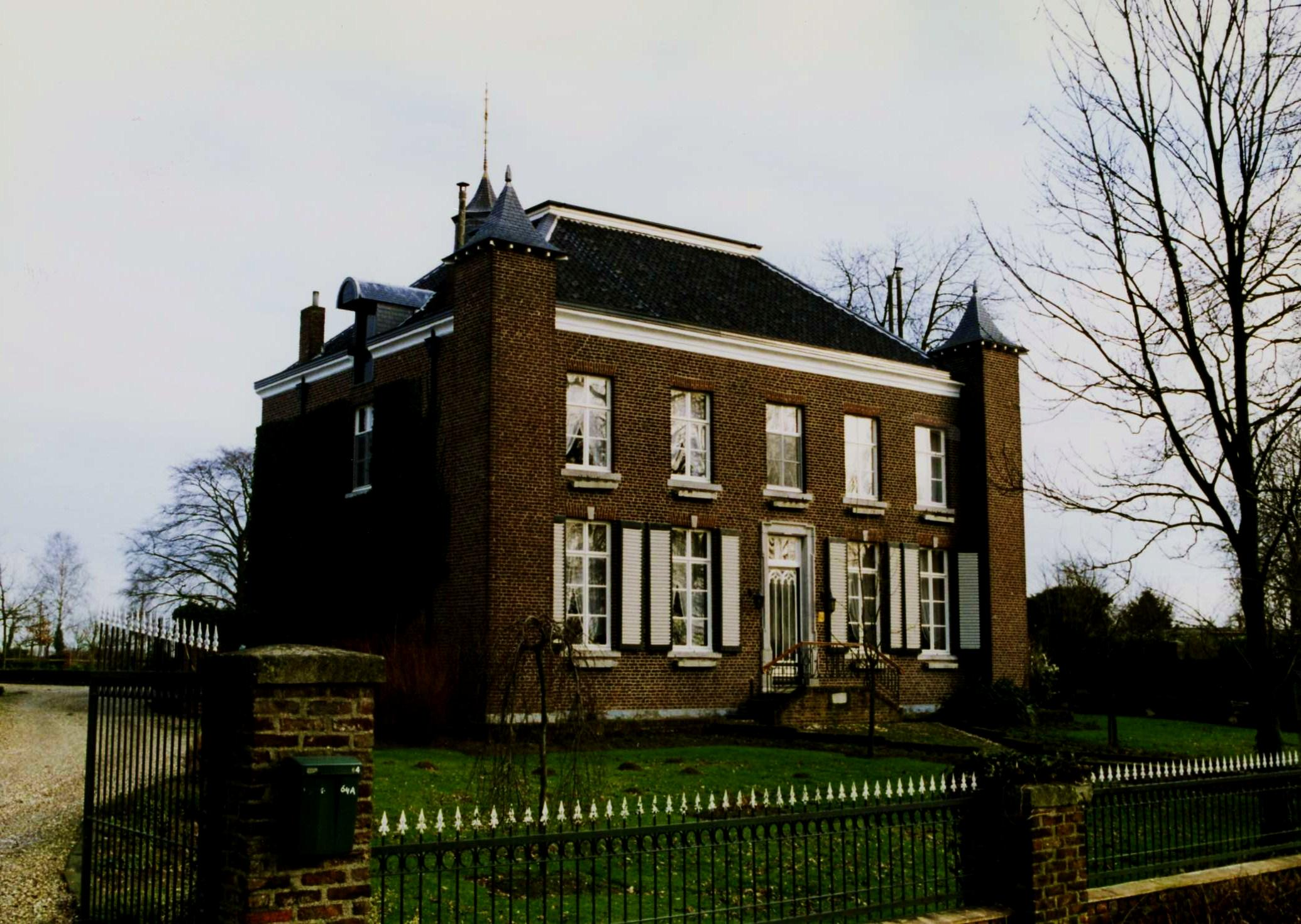
Estate Malborgh

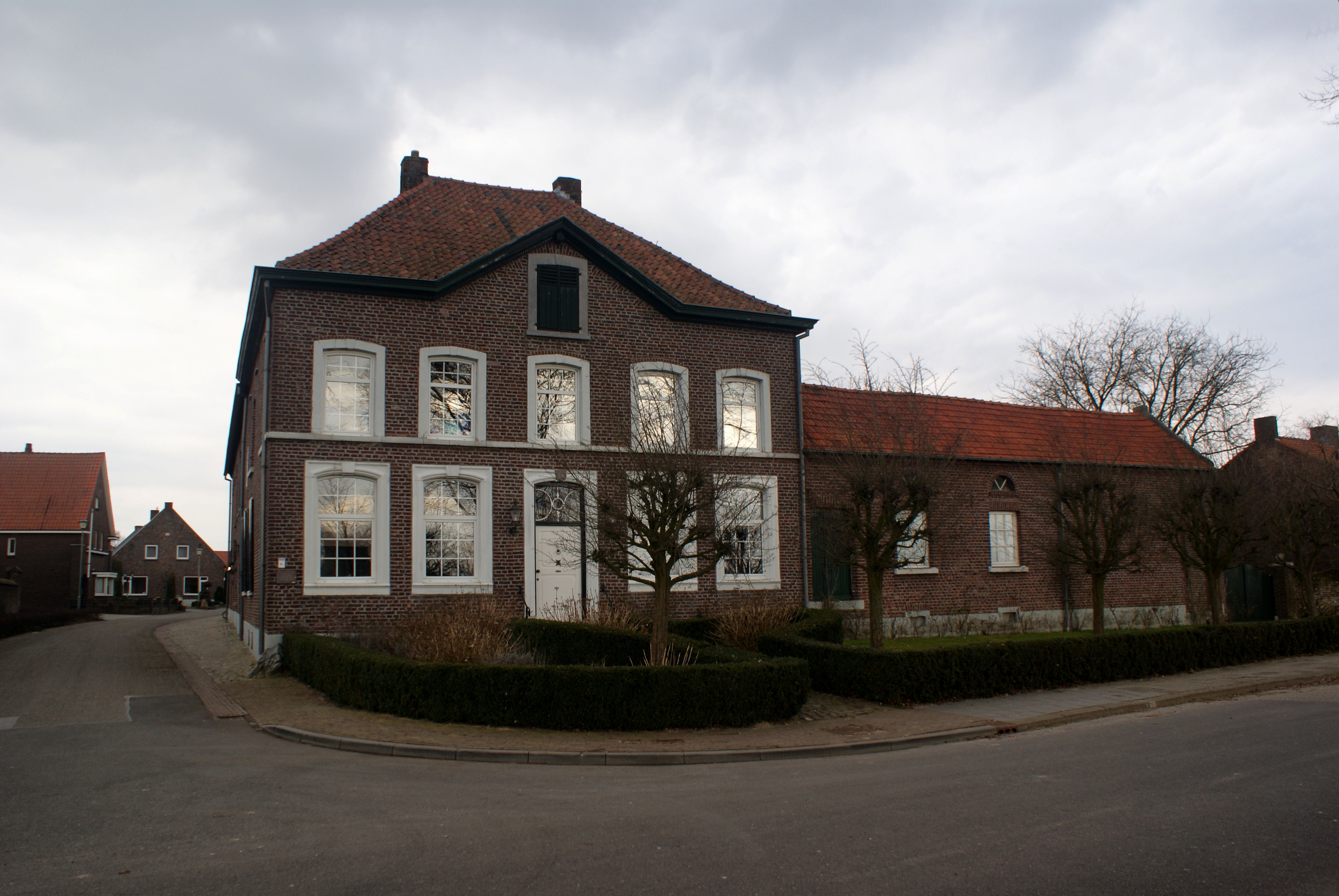
Farm in Buggenum

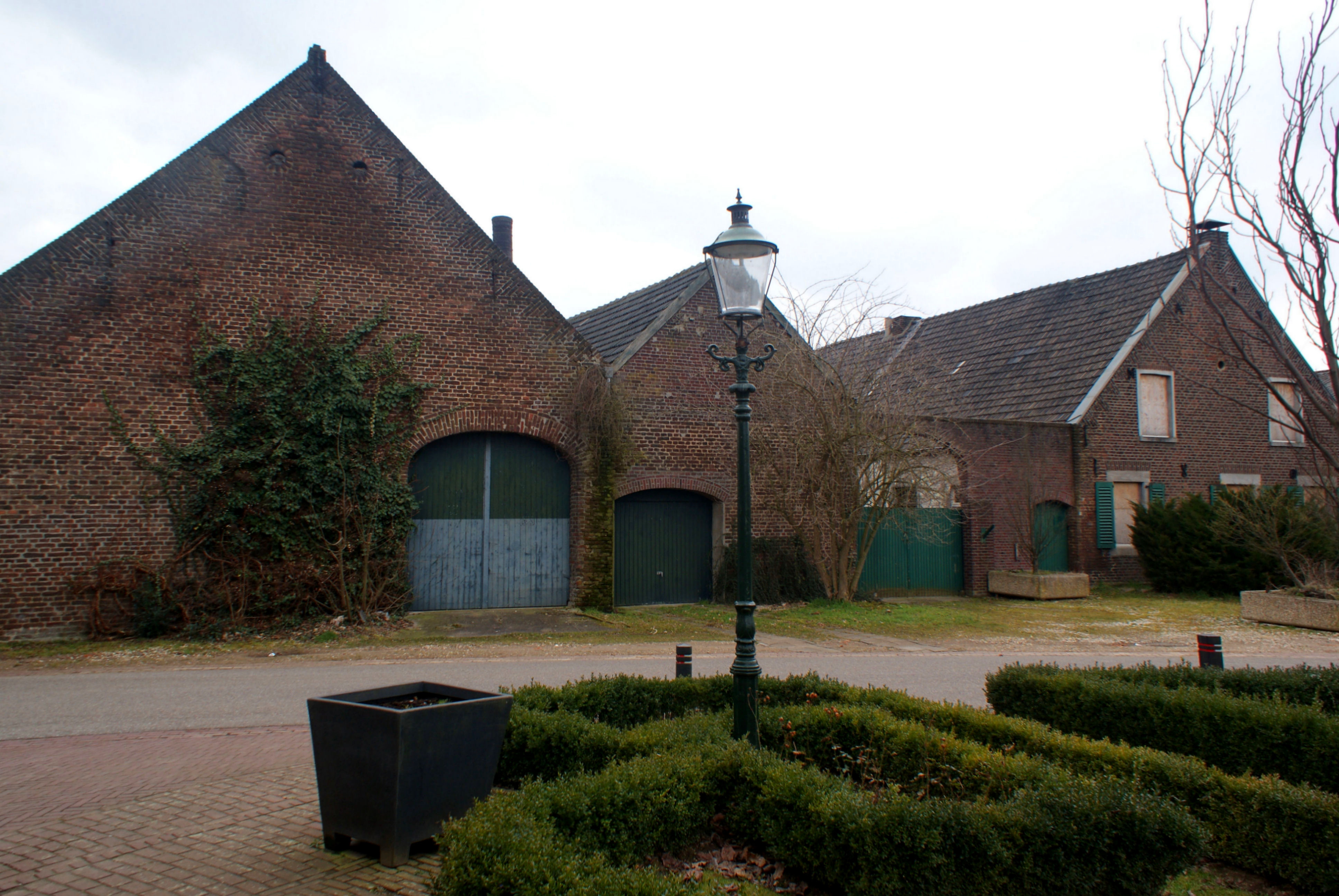
Farm Leynhof

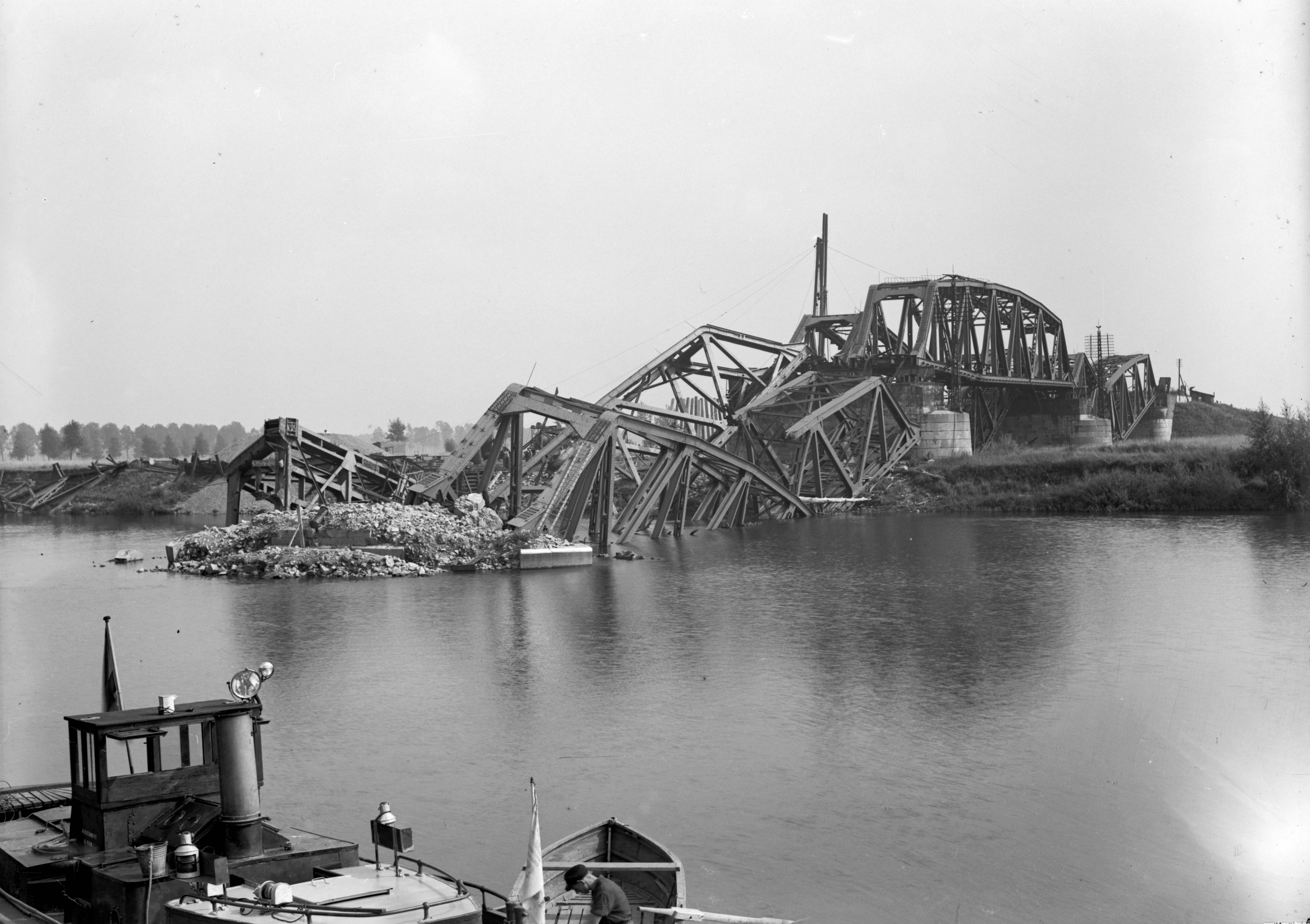
Destroyed railway bridge during World War II
