= Nunhem =

Nunhem Nunem (Limburgish)
- Village
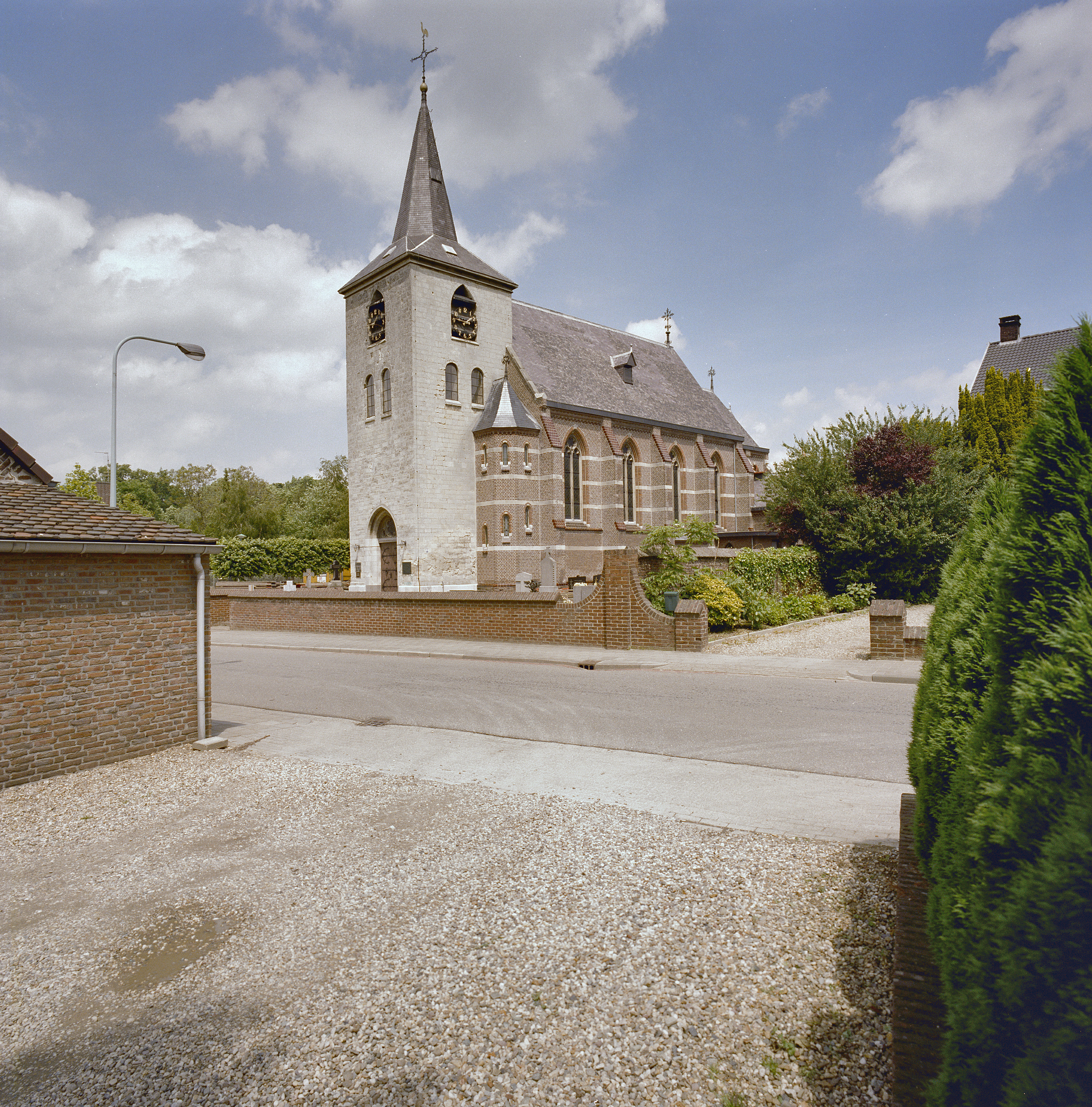
- St Servatius Church

- Location in the Netherlands Location in the province of Limburg in the Netherlands
- Coordinates: 51°14′40″N 5°57′40″E
- Country: Netherlands
- Province: Limburg
- Municipality: Leudal

Area
  - Total: 4.37 km^{2} (1.69 sq mi)
- Elevation: 22 m (72 ft)

Population (2021)
  - Total: 660
  - Density: 150/km^{2} (390/sq mi)
- Time zone: UTC+1 (CET)
  - Summer (DST): UTC+2 (CEST)
- Postal code: 6083
- Dialing code: 0475
- Major roads: N273

Nunhem (Limburgish: Nunem) is a village in the Dutch province of Limburg. It is located in the municipality of Leudal, 1 km north of Haelen.

== History ==
The village was first mentioned in 1306 as Nunhem, and means "new settlement". Nunhem developed along the Haelense Beek.

The Catholic St Servatius Church is a single aisled church. The tower dates from the 14th century and was probably enlarged in the 18th century. The church was built in 1893 in Gothic Revival style. The St Servatius Chapel is a site of pilgrimage. There is a well behind the chapel which, according to legend, was dug by Servatius of Tongeren and used to baptise people.

Huis Nunhem is a manor house which was first attested in 1458. In the early-18th century, the current house was built which was remodelled in 1778 and corner towers were added. The estate burnt down in 1947 and restored in 1999.

Nunhem was home to 166 people in 1840.

== Gallery ==
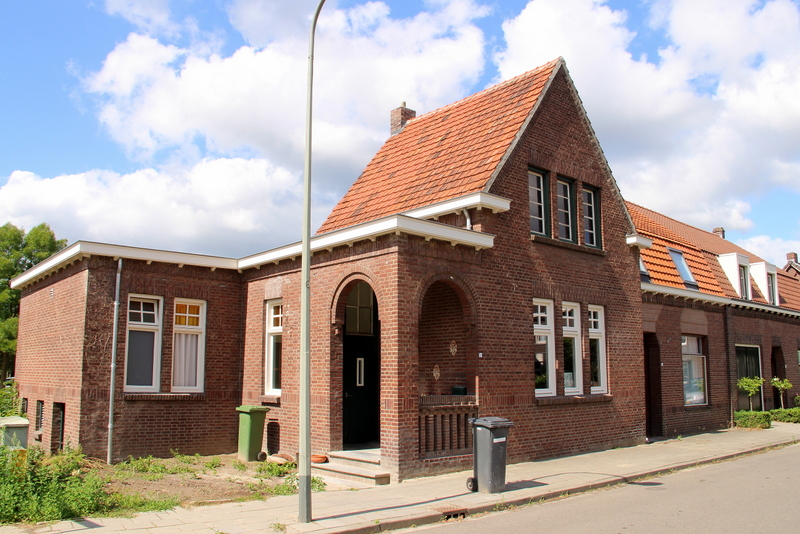
Former town hall

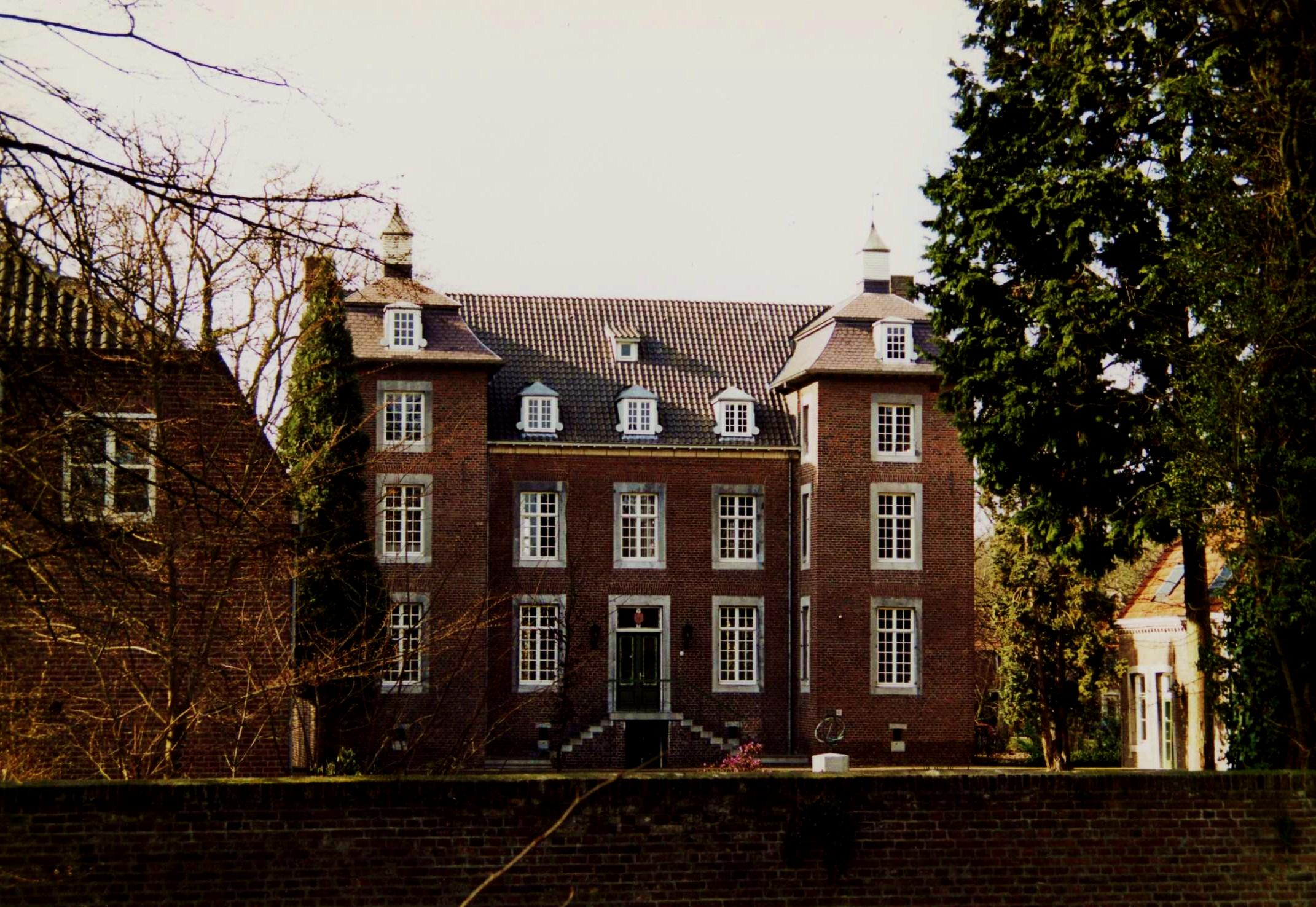
Huis Nunhem

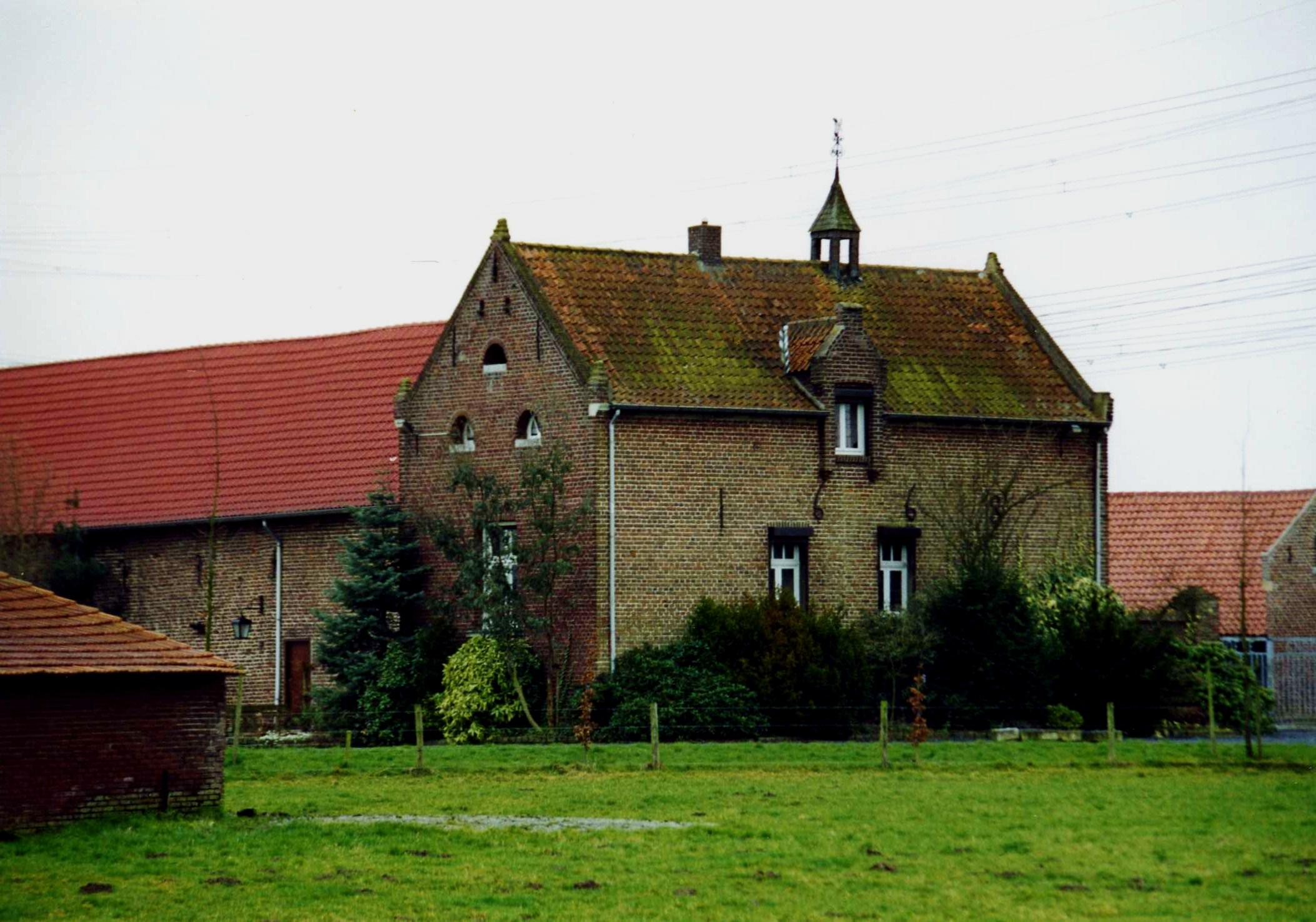
Farm Niënghoor

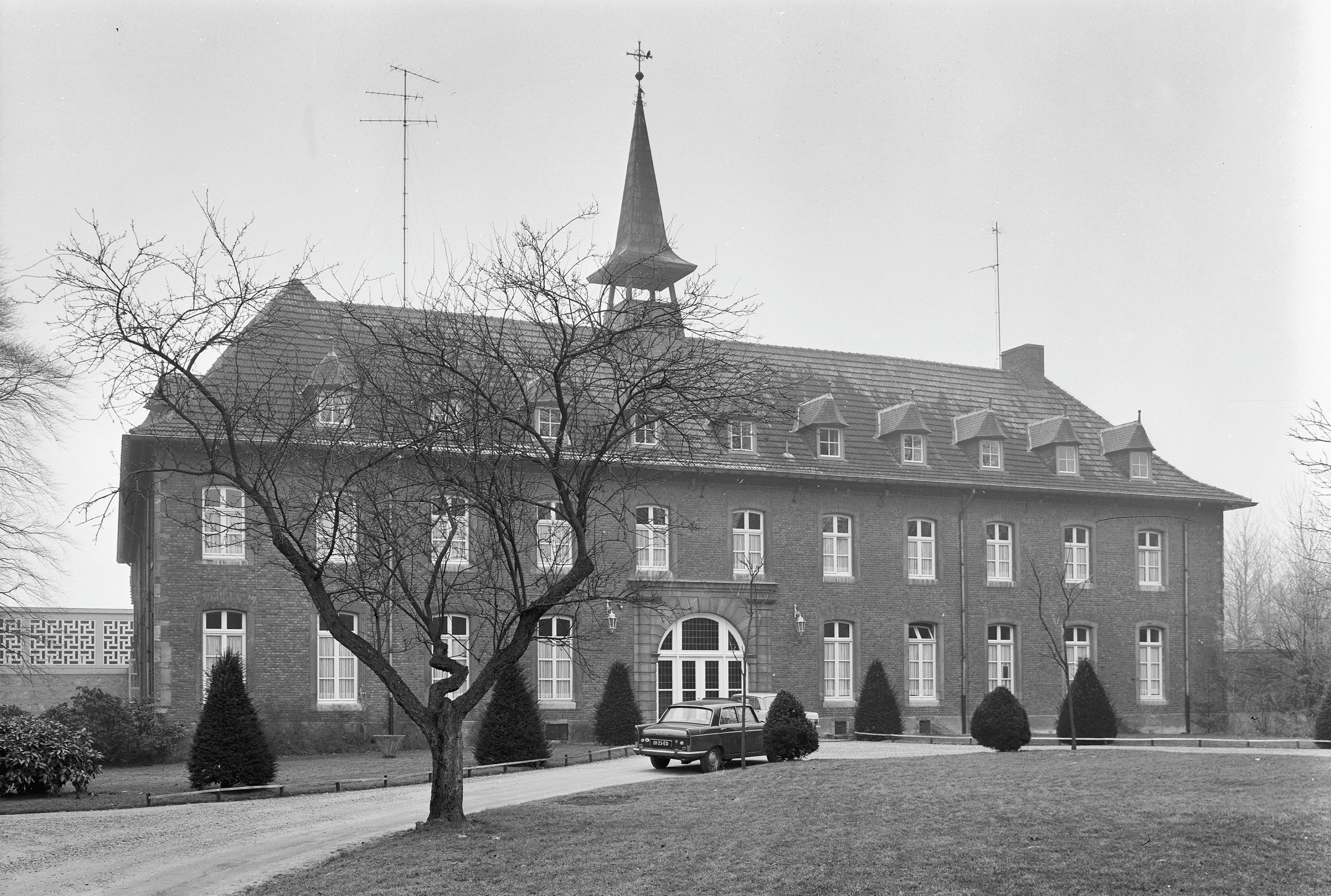
Former monastery Sint Elisabethdal (1968)
