= Grathem =

Grathem Gratem (Limburgish)
- Village
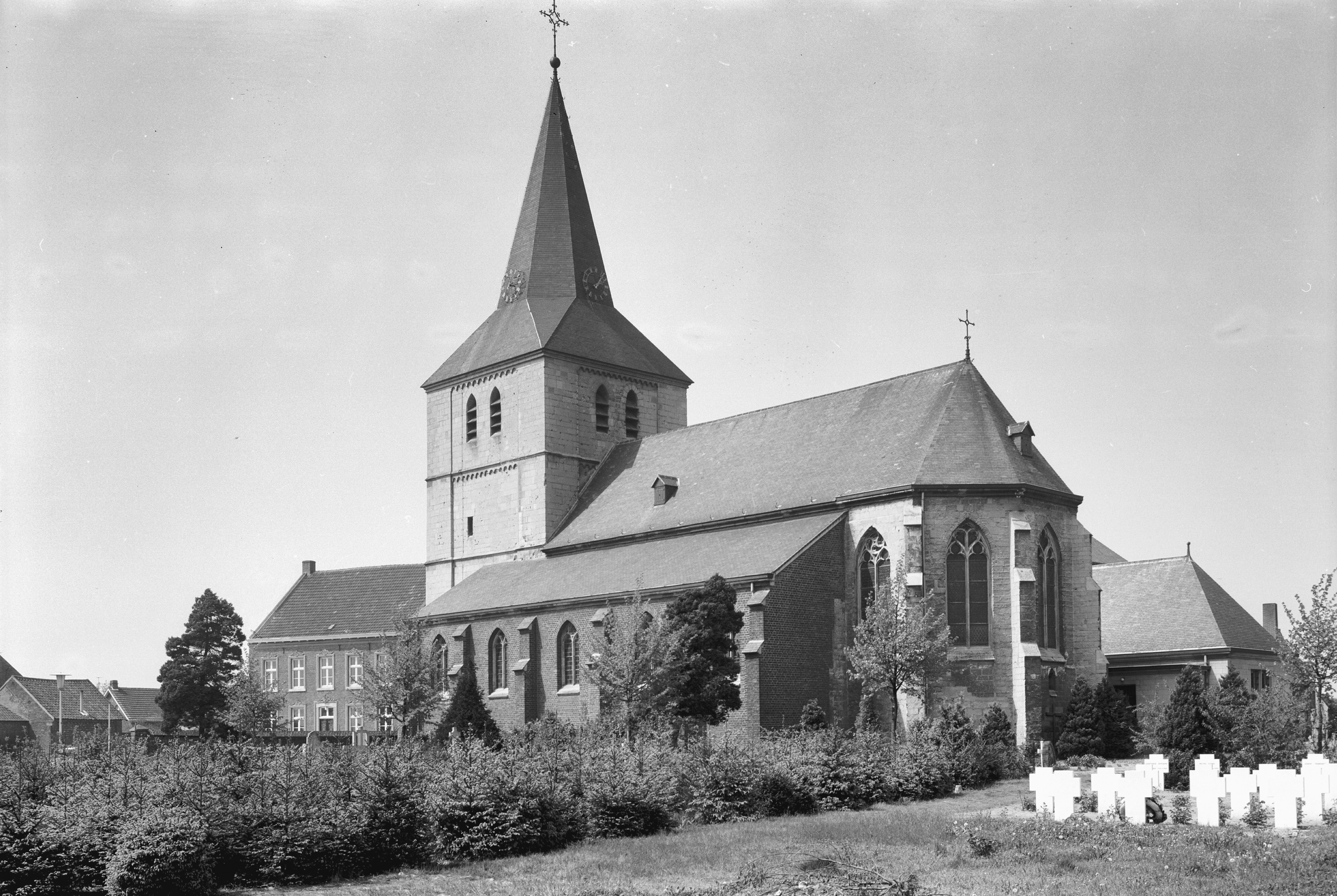
- Severin Church in 1965

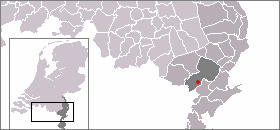

- Location in the Netherlands Location in the province of Limburg in the Netherlands
- Coordinates: 51°11′28″N 5°51′31″E
- Country: Netherlands
- Province: Limburg
- Municipality: Leudal

Area
  - Total: 7.78 km^{2} (3.00 sq mi)
- Elevation: 28 m (92 ft)

Population (2021)
  - Total: 1,720
  - Density: 221/km^{2} (573/sq mi)
- Time zone: UTC+1 (CET)
  - Summer (DST): UTC+2 (CEST)
- Postal code: 6096
- Dialing code: 0475

Grathem (Dutch pronunciation: [ˈɣraːtəm]; Limburgish: Gratem) is a village in the Dutch province of Limburg. It is located in the municipality of Leudal, about 10 km west of Roermond.

== History ==
It was first mentioned in 1116 as Grathem. The etymology is unclear. Grathem developed along the Uffelse Beek. It was part of the Imperial Abbey of Thorn, a tiny independent country, until 1794.

The Catholic St Severinus Church is a three aisled church. The tower has 13th century elements. The church was severely damaged in 1944, and was rebuilt between 1953 and 1954. Some parts of the interior are still from the 15th century.

Ten Hove Castle is surrounded by a double moat. Its existence was first mentioned in 1210 and it was destroyed in 1340. In 1680, the main building received its current appearance. In 1933, it was converted into a nunnery. It was damaged by war in 1944, and restored between 1961 and 1963.

The watermill Grathemermolen was built in 1874 and served as a grist mill. From 1915 until the late 1920s, it generated electricity for the village. In 2006, the watermill went out of service. In 2012, it was sold and restored. In 2017, it sold to the municipality for €1,00.

Grathem was home to 515 people in 1840. It was a separate municipality until 1991, when it was merged with Heythuysen.

== Gallery ==
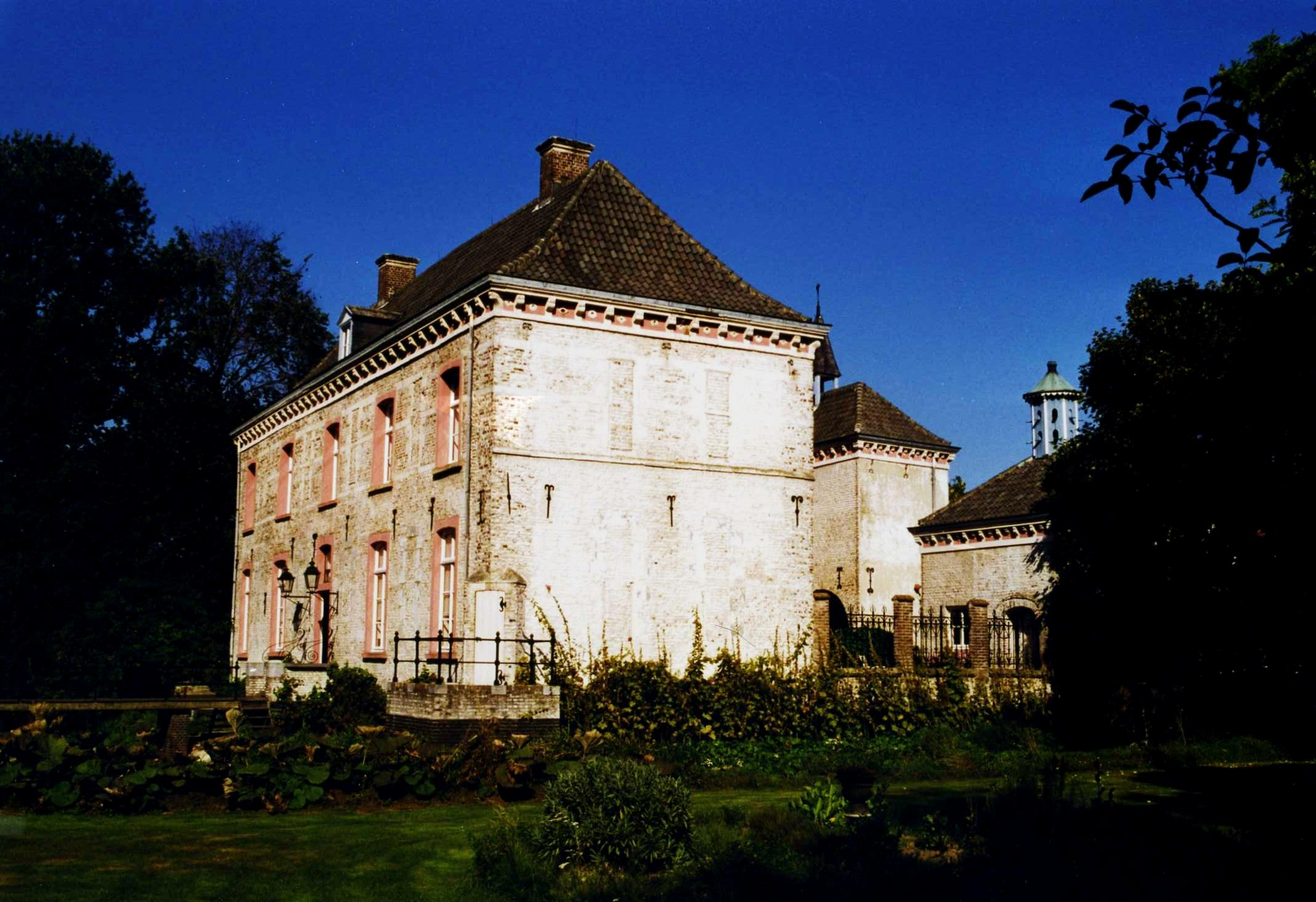
Castle Ten Hove

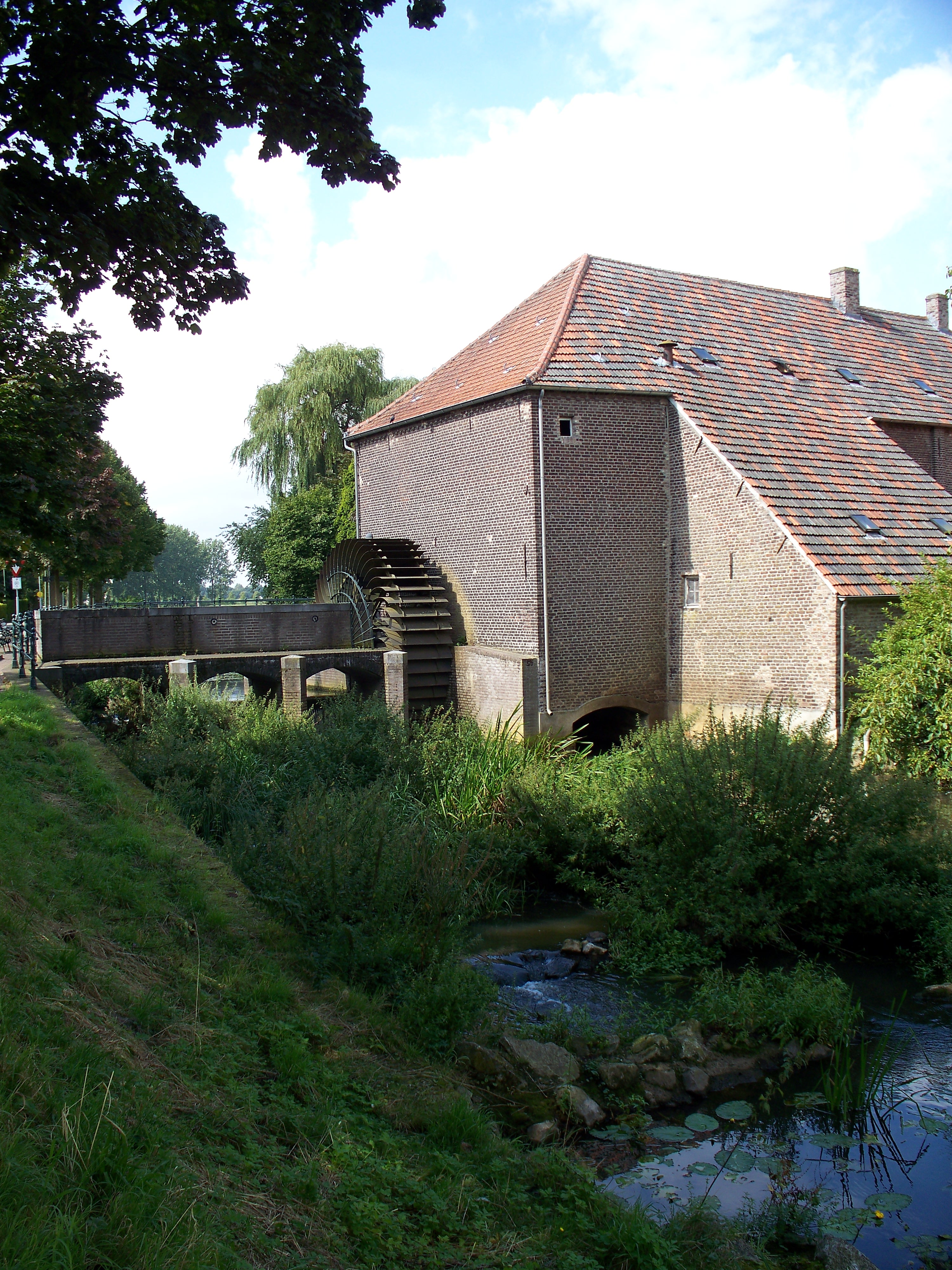
Watermill Graetemmermolen
