= Haler =

- Village
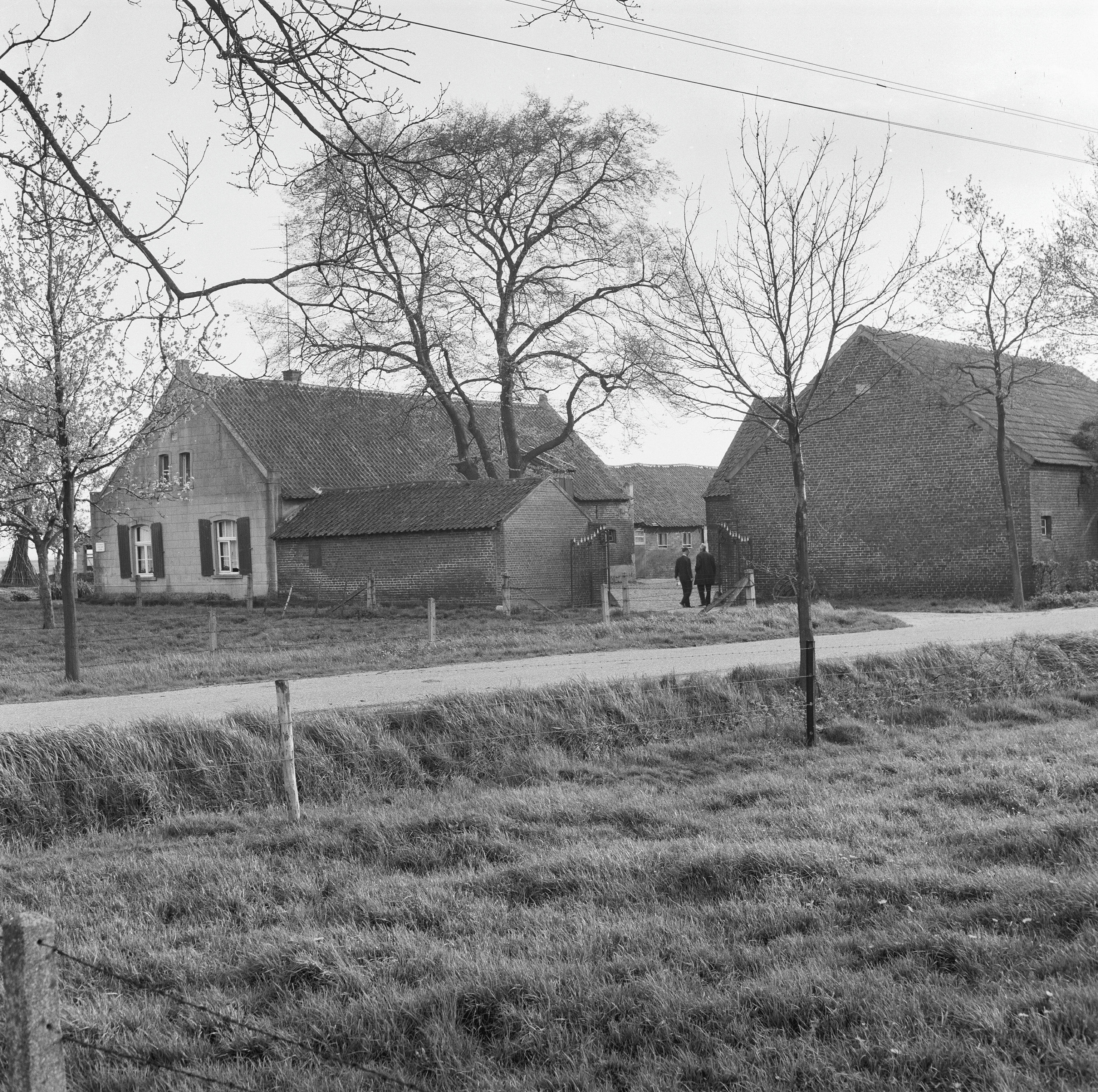
- Farm in Haler

- Location in the Netherlands Location in the province of Limburg in the Netherlands
- Coordinates: 51°11′N 5°47′E
- Country: Netherlands
- Province: Limburg
- Municipality: Leudal

Area
  - Total: 8.31 km^{2} (3.21 sq mi)
- Elevation: 30 m (98 ft)

Population (2021)
  - Total: 485
  - Density: 58.4/km^{2} (151/sq mi)
- Time zone: UTC+1 (CET)
  - Summer (DST): UTC+2 (CEST)
- Postal code: 6012
- Dialing code: 0495

Haler (formerly known as Haler-Uffelse) is a village in the Dutch province of Limburg. It is a part of the municipality of Leudal and lies about 9 km southeast of Weert.

The village was first mentioned in 1244 as Harle, and is a combination of "sandy ridge" and "open forest". Haler was home to 290 people in 1840. In 1952, a church was built.
