= Baexem =

Baexem Boaksum (Limburgish)
- Village
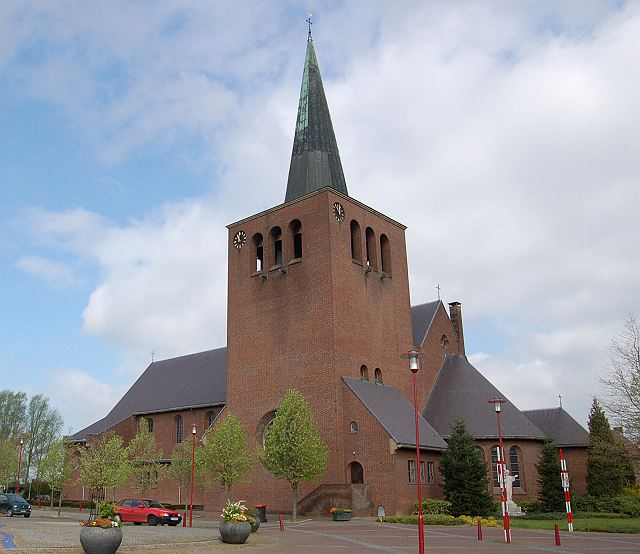
- Church of Baexem

- Flag Coat of arms

- Location in the Netherlands Location in the province of Limburg in the Netherlands
- Coordinates: 51°13′36″N 5°52′50″E
- Country: Netherlands
- Province: Limburg
- Municipality: Leudal

Area
  - Total: 11.08 km^{2} (4.28 sq mi)
- Elevation: 28 m (92 ft)

Population (2021)
  - Total: 2,680
  - Density: 242/km^{2} (626/sq mi)
- Time zone: UTC+1 (CET)
  - Summer (DST): UTC+2 (CEST)
- Postal code: 6095
- Dialing code: 0475
- Major roads: N279, N280

Baexem (Limburgish: Boaksum/Boakse) is a village in the Dutch province of Limburg. It is a part of the municipality of Leudal, and lies about 9 kilometres northwest of Roermond.

== History ==
The village was first mentioned in 1244 as Baxen, and means "settlement of Bako (person)". Baexem was part of the Imperial Abbey of Thorn, a tiny independent country, until 1794. It developed into two centres in the 19th century. One was located along the Antwerp to Roermond railway line and the other Roermond to Weert road. In the 20th century, the settlements merged.

The St John the Baptist Church was built between 1949 and 1950 to replace the old church which was destroyed in 1944. A tower was added in 1958. Baexem Castle was first mentioned in 1244. The castle received its current shape from 1676 onwards. Two side wings were probably added in the 18th century.

The grist mill Aurora was built in 1845. In 1945, the miller and his assistant were repairing the wind mill when it suddenly started to turn and killed the miller. The new owner only used the electro motor. The wind mill was restored in 1972, and operates on a voluntary basis.

Baexem was home to 576 people in 1840. Until 1991, Baexem was a separate municipality; it then became a part of Heythuysen. It is part of the municipality of Leudal since 2007.

== Gallery ==
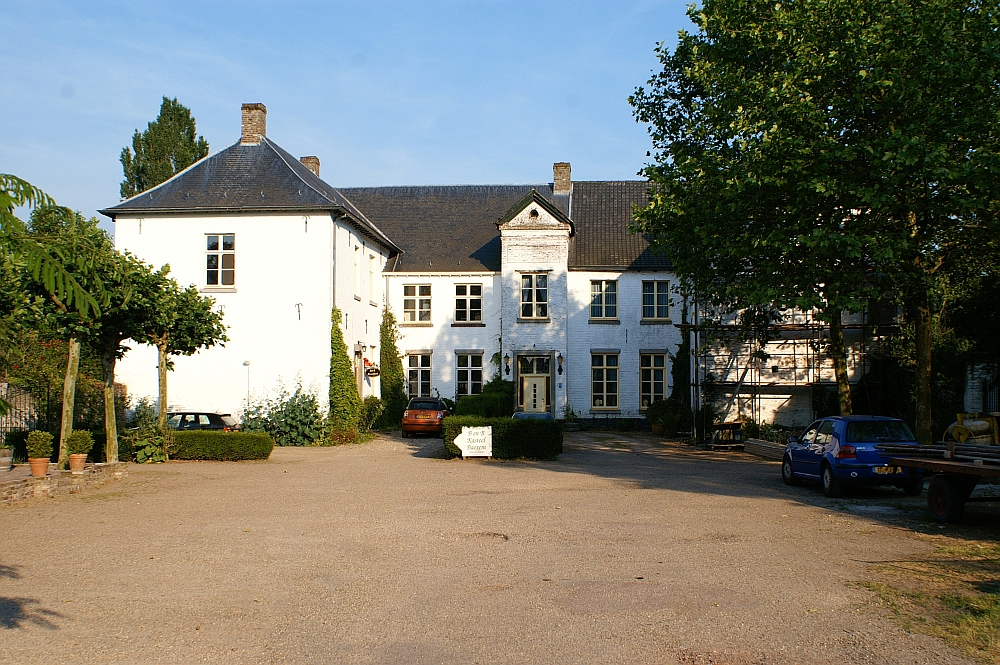
Huise Baexem

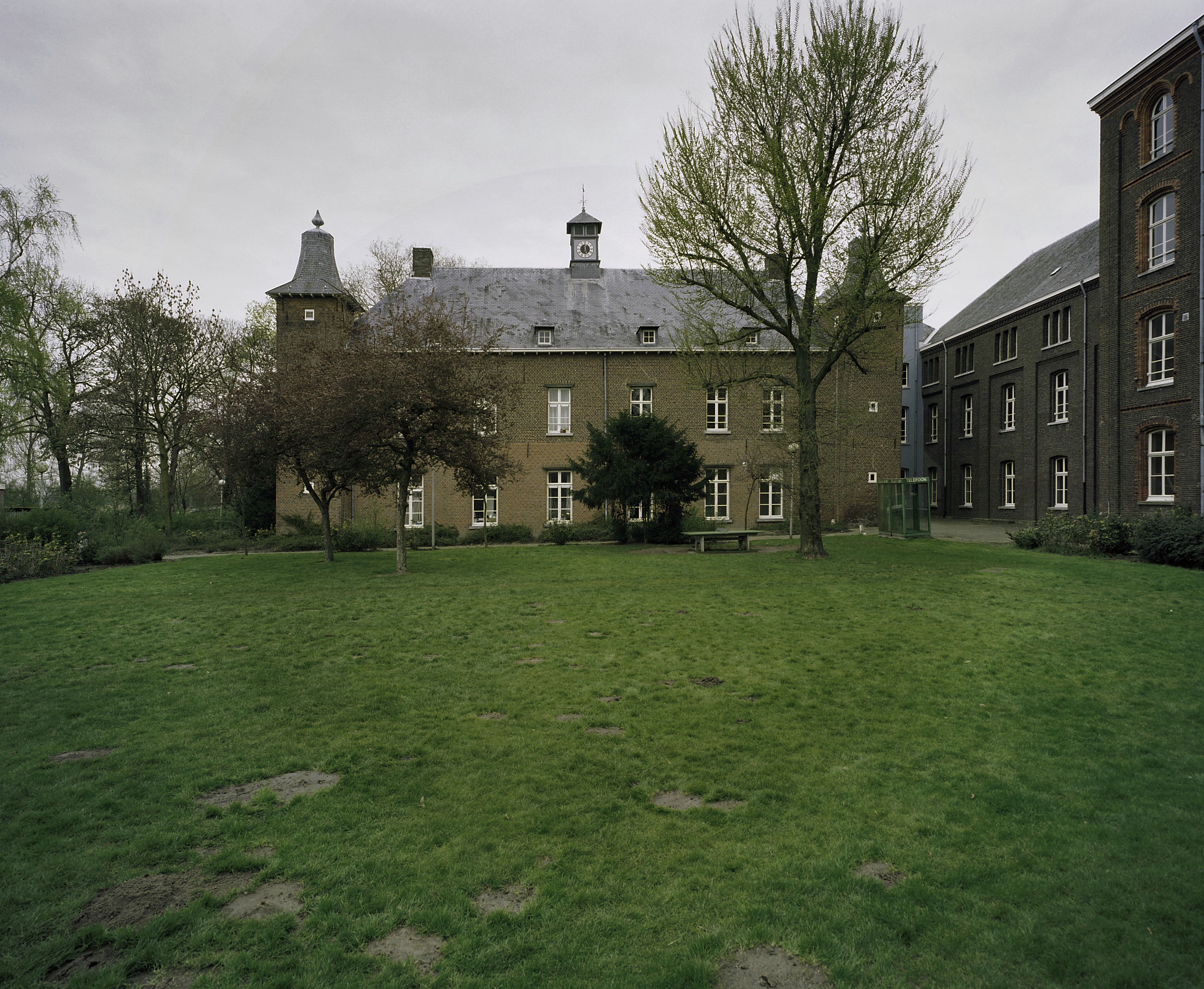
Franciscan monastery

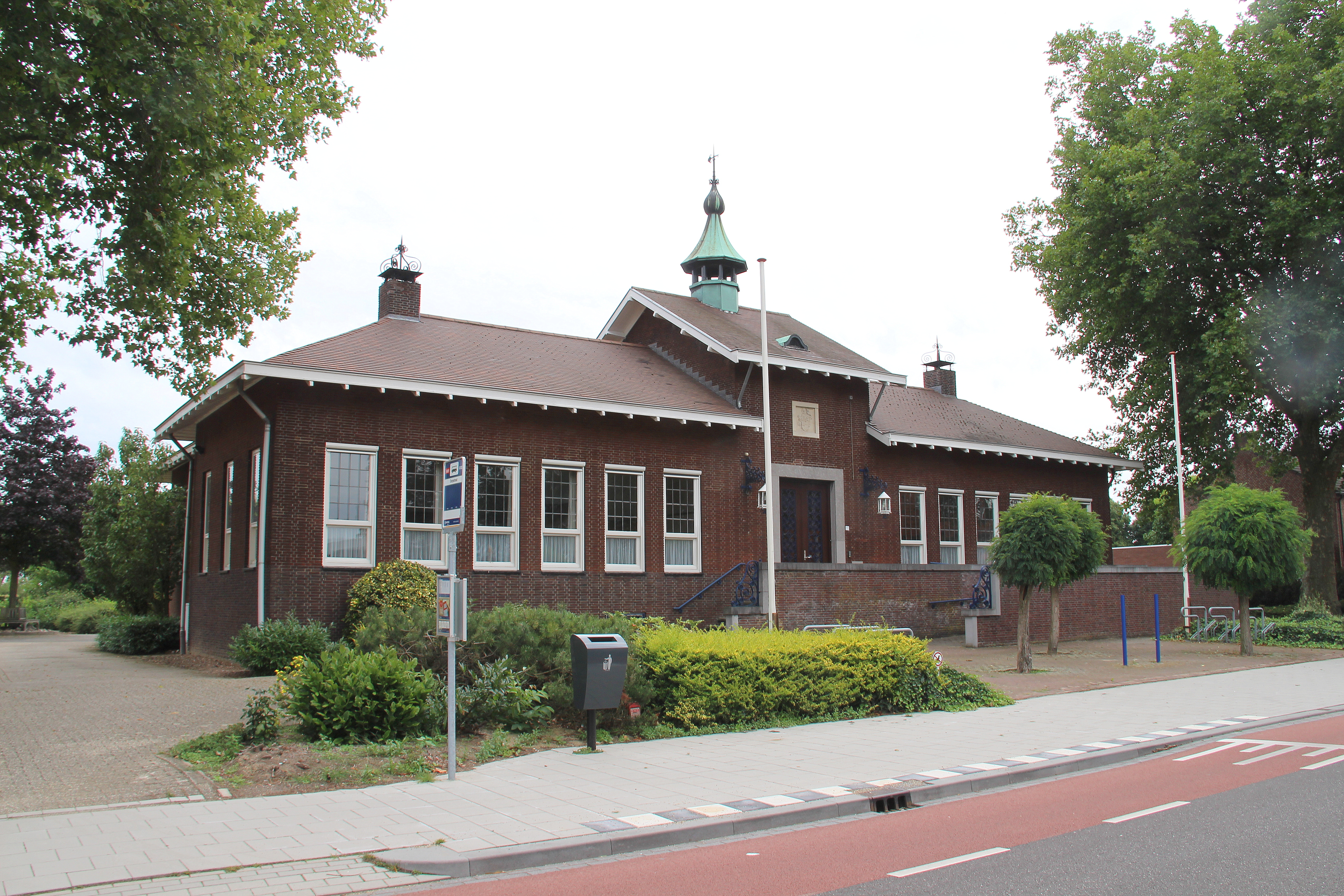
Former town hall

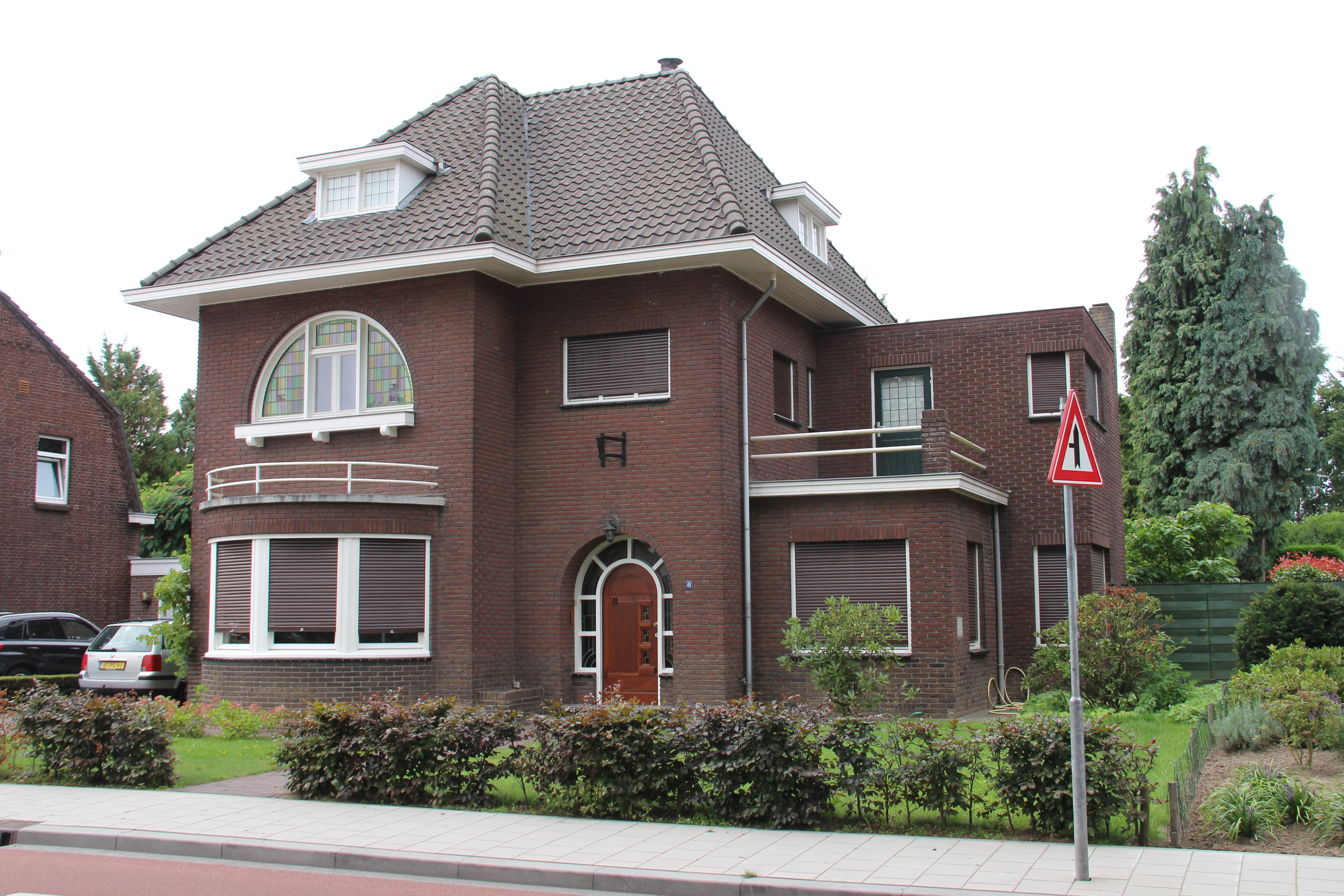
House in Baexem
