= Ittervoort =

- Village
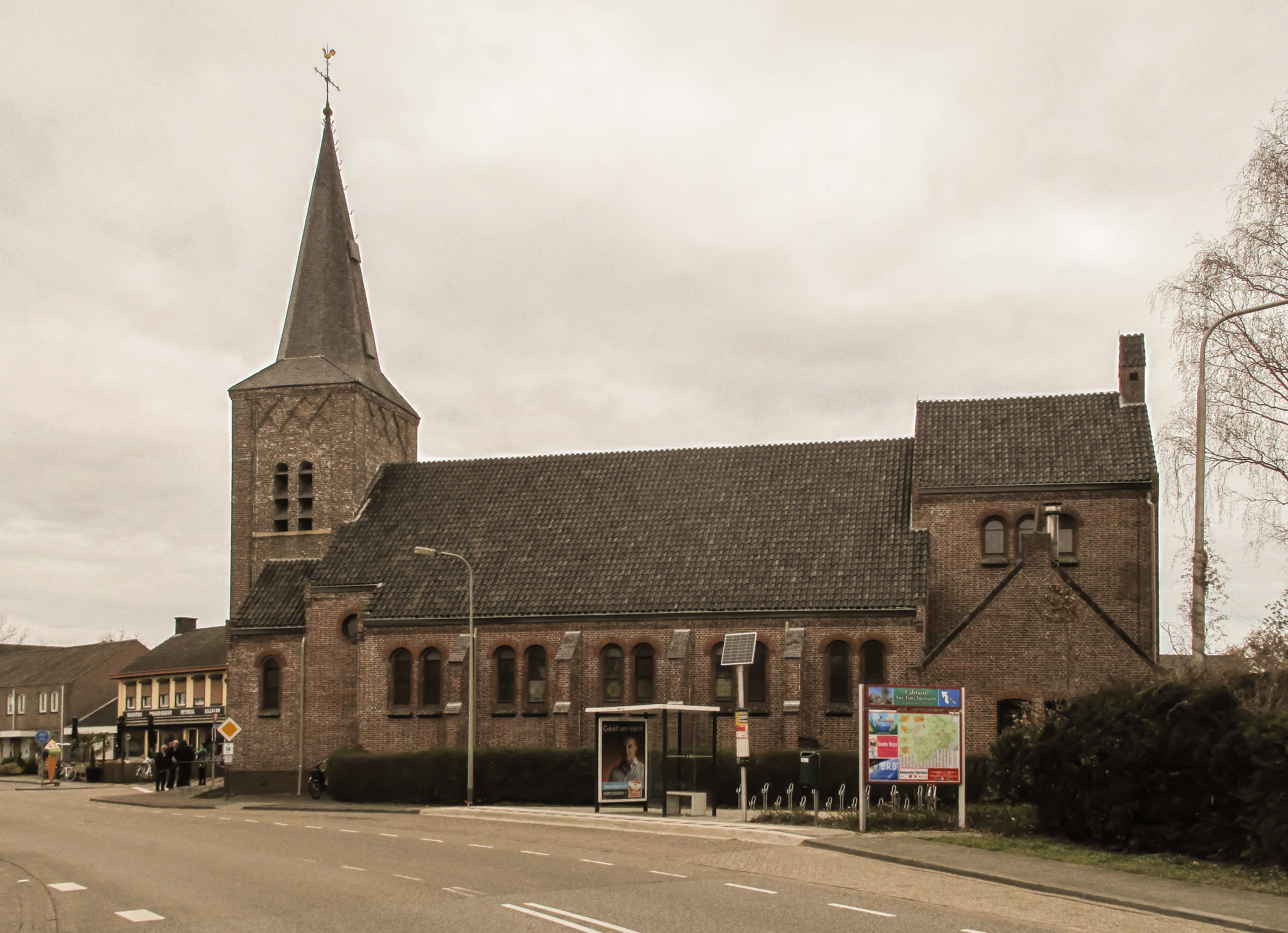
- St Margaretha Church

- Location in the Netherlands Location in the province of Limburg in the Netherlands
- Coordinates: 51°10′19″N 5°49′16″E
- Country: Netherlands
- Province: Limburg
- Municipality: Leudal

Area
  - Total: 4.09 km^{2} (1.58 sq mi)
- Elevation: 28 m (92 ft)

Population (2021)
  - Total: 1,655
  - Density: 405/km^{2} (1,050/sq mi)
- Time zone: UTC+1 (CET)
  - Summer (DST): UTC+2 (CEST)
- Postal code: 6014
- Dialing code: 0475
- Major roads: A2, N273

Ittervoort is a village in the Dutch province of Limburg. It is located in the municipality of Leudal.

== History ==
The village was first mentioned in 1252 as Itervort, and means "fordable place in the Itterbeek". In 1343, a bridge was built.

The St Margarita Church was built in 1935, however the tower from 1894 was incorporated in the design.

The watermill Schouwsmolen was probably built around 1630 and was used as a grist mill. In 1928, an electro motor was installed, and it went out of service in 1961. Between 2015 and 2016, it was restored and is used to grind corn and generate electricity.

Ittervoort was home to 235 people in 1840. It was a separate municipality until 1942, when it was merged with Hunsel. In 2007, it became part of the municipality of Leudal.

== Gallery ==
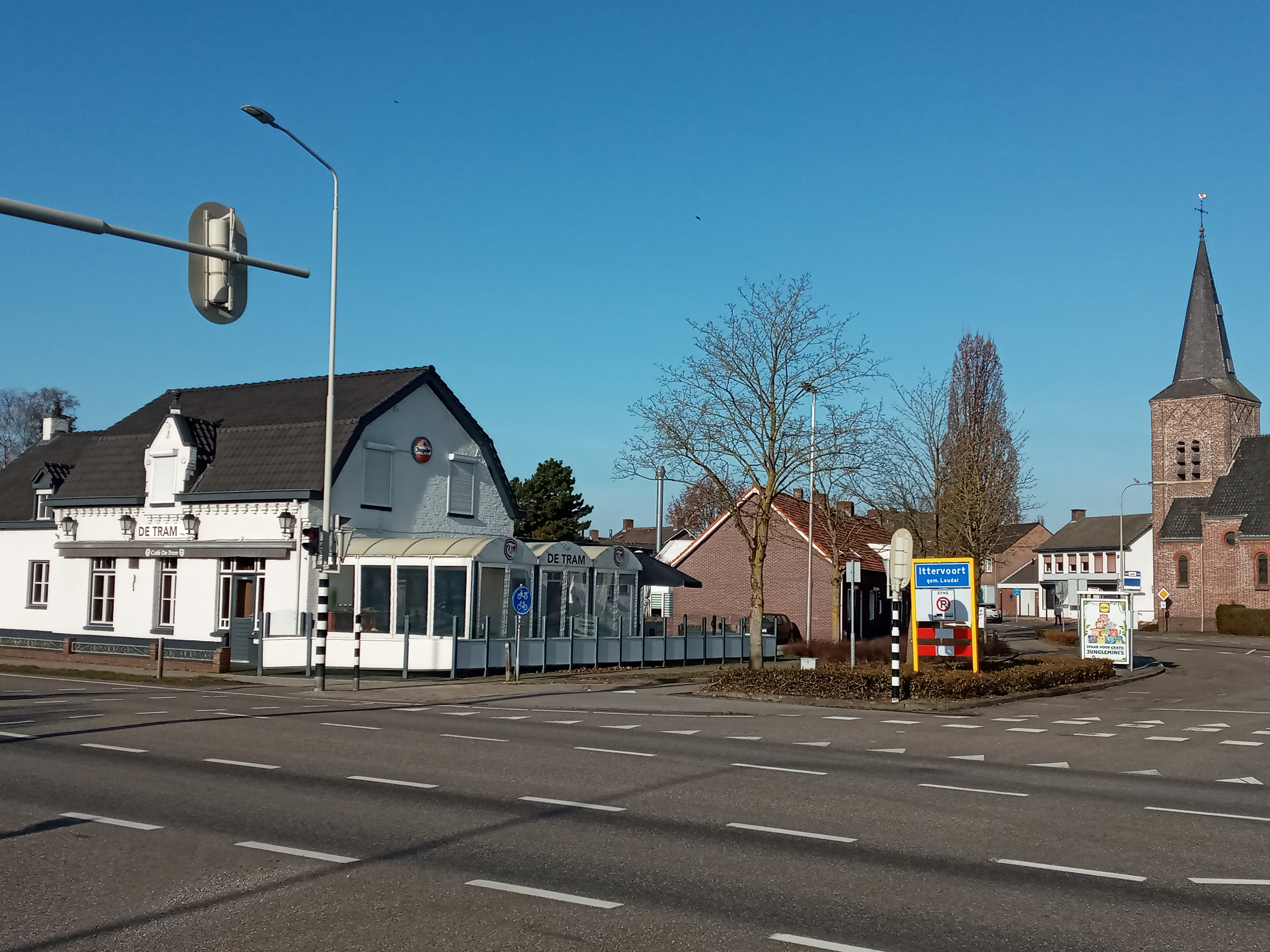
Welcome to Ittervoort

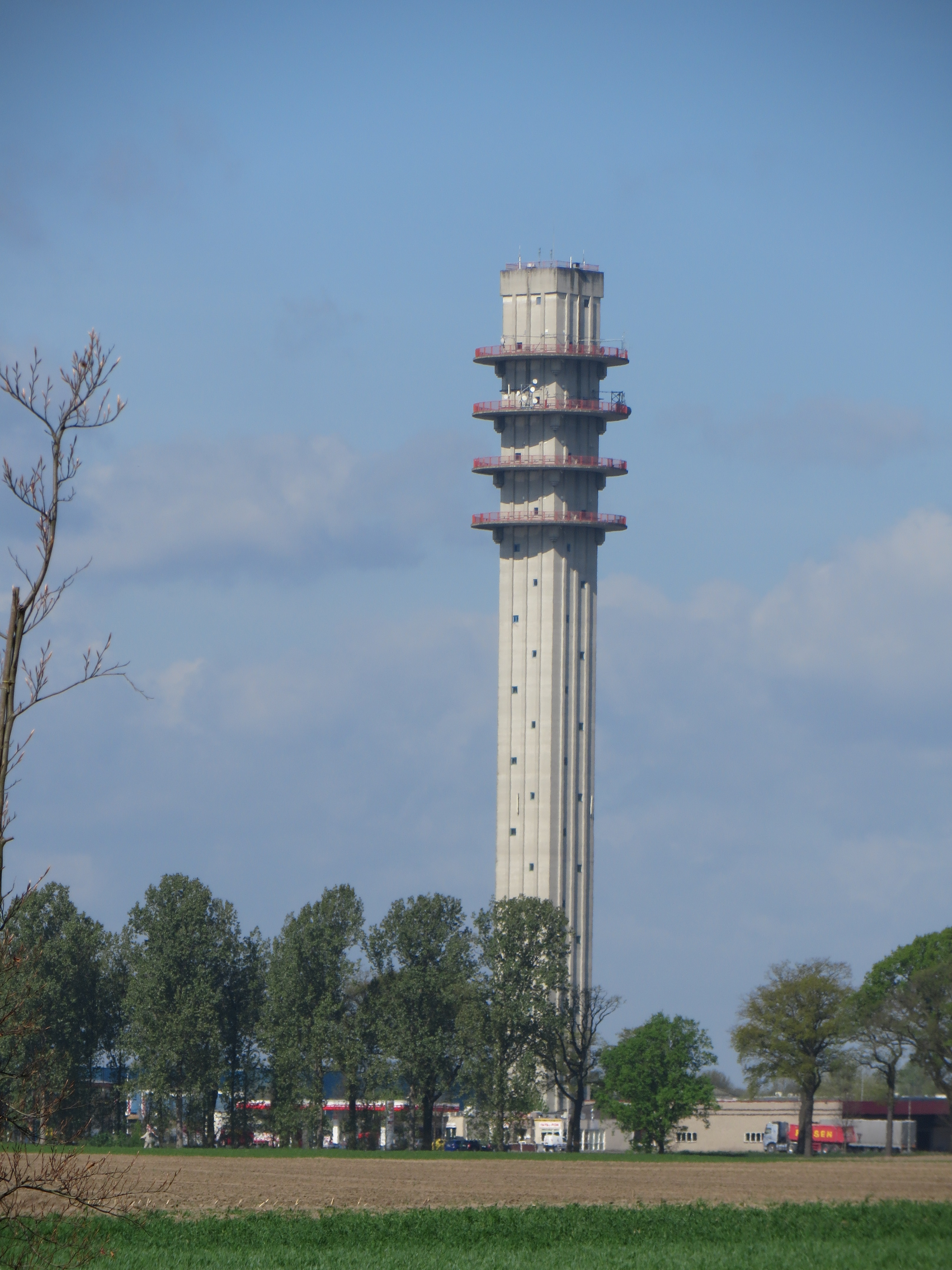
Communication tower of Ittervoort

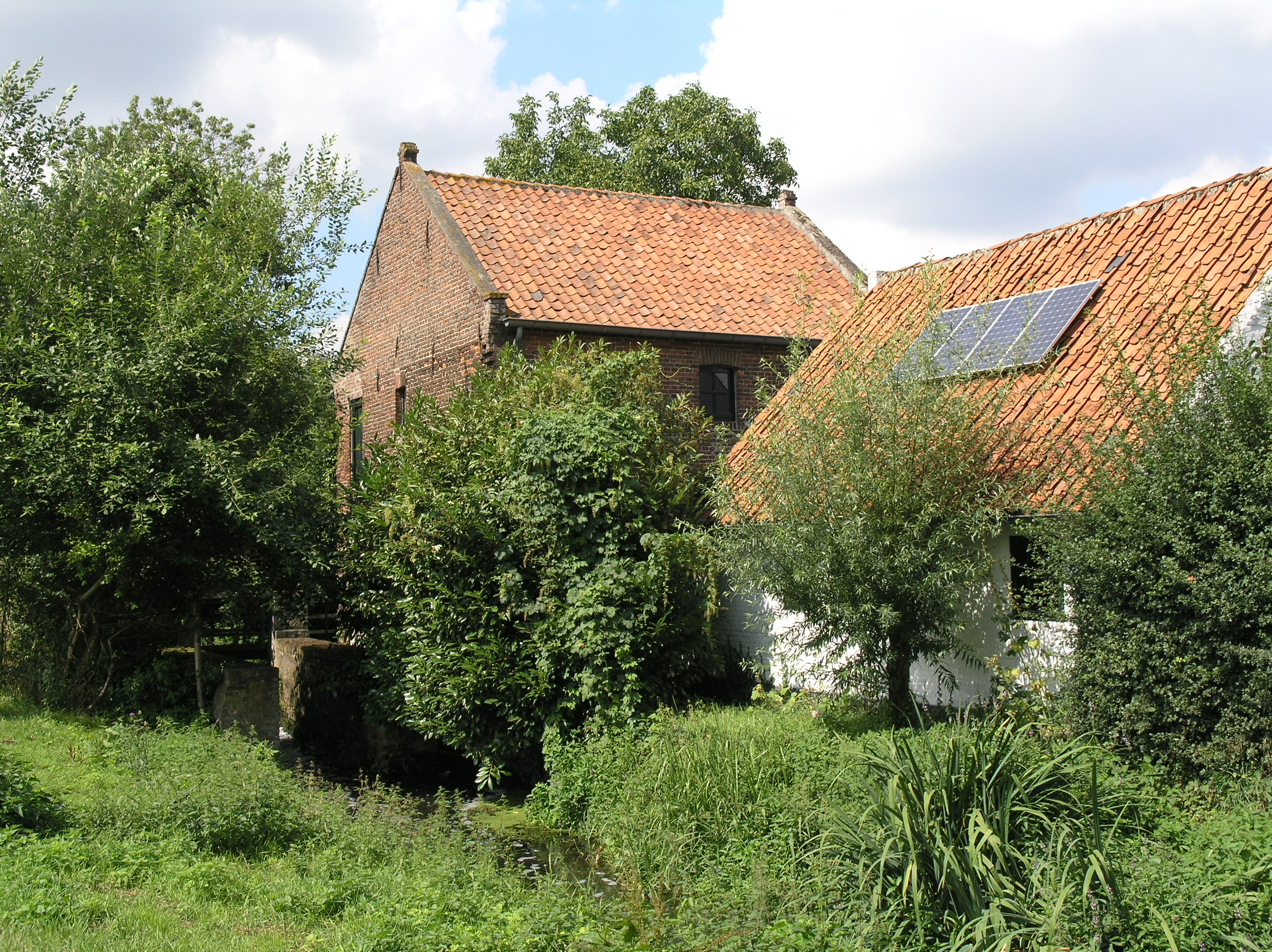
Watermill Schouwsmolen
