= Neer =

Neer Naer (Limburgish)
- Village
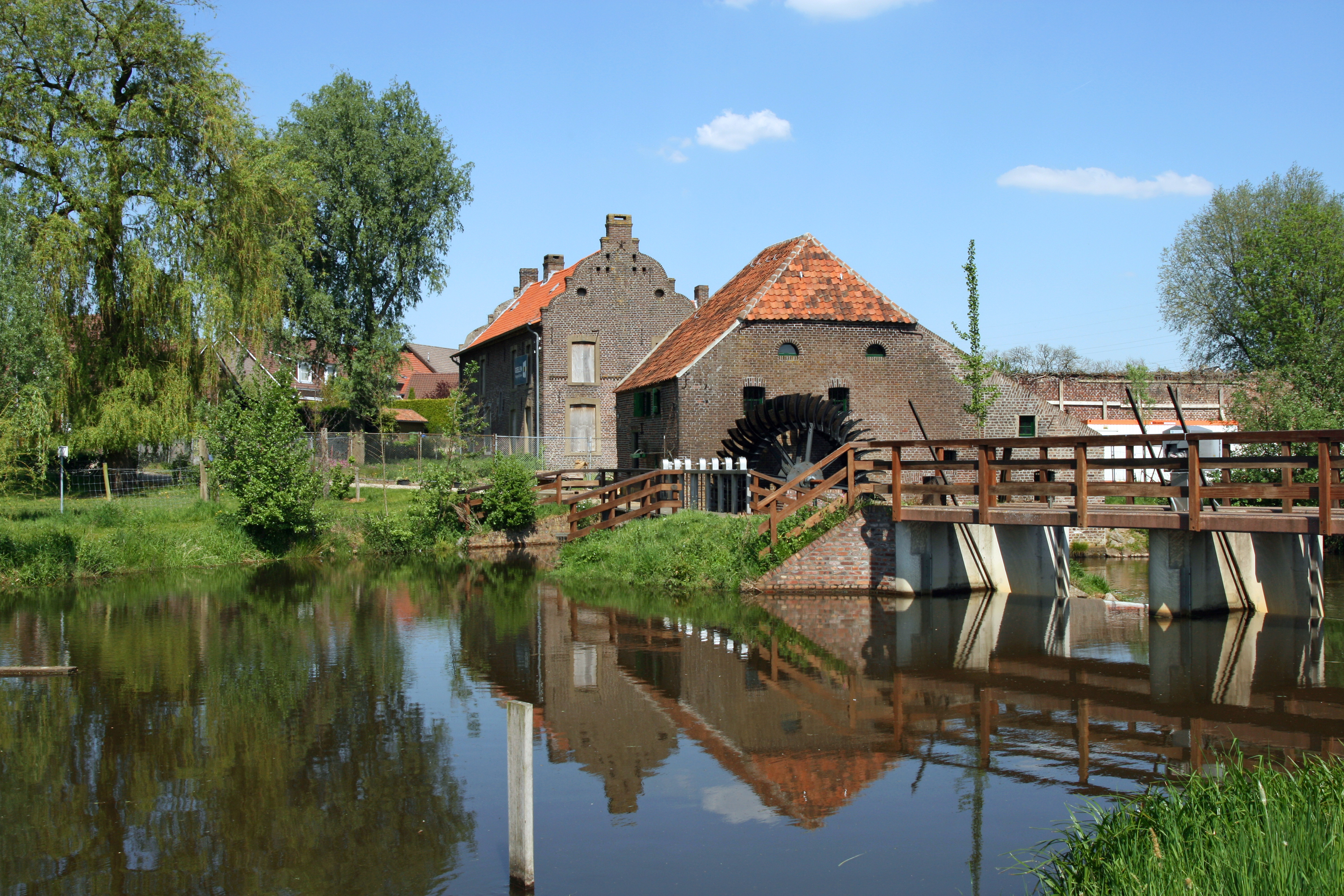
- Watermill Friedesse Molen

- Location in the Netherlands Location in the province of Limburg in the Netherlands
- Coordinates: 51°15′45″N 5°59′20″E
- Country: Netherlands
- Province: Limburg
- Municipality: Leudal

Area
  - Total: 20.09 km^{2} (7.76 sq mi)
- Elevation: 26 m (85 ft)

Population (2021)
  - Total: 3,380
  - Density: 168/km^{2} (436/sq mi)
- Time zone: UTC+1 (CET)
  - Summer (DST): UTC+2 (CEST)
- Postal code: 6086
- Dialing code: 0475
- Major roads: N273

Neer is a village in Limburg, Netherlands. It is located in the municipality of Leudal, on the river Maas about 8 km north of Roermond.

== History ==
The village was first mentioned in 1204 as Nere, and refers to the brook Neerbeek. Neer developed in the Early Middle Ages on higher sand grounds along the Neerbeek close to its confluence with the Maas. Neer was first part of the County of Horne and later the Prince-Bishopric of Liège. In 1677, it became a heerlijkheid.

The Catholic St Martinus is a three aisled basilica-like church with a tower at a side. It was probably completed around 1400. The church was replaced between 1908 and 1909 in a Gothic Revival style, but the tower remained and was enlarged. The top of the tower was blown up in 1944, and rebuilt in 1954 in a more modest style.

The watermill Friedesse Molen was built in 1617 and served as a grist mill. In the early 1950s, an electro motor was installed. Both the Province and the population of Neer lobbied for a much needed restoration, and in 2002, the watermill was restored and is sometimes in service.

Neer was home to 678 people in 1840. It was a separate municipality until 1991, when it was merged with Roggel. In 2007, it became part of the municipality of Leudal.

== Gallery ==
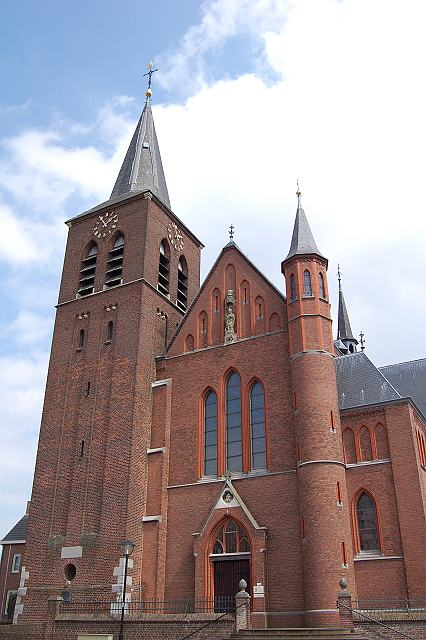
Church of Neer

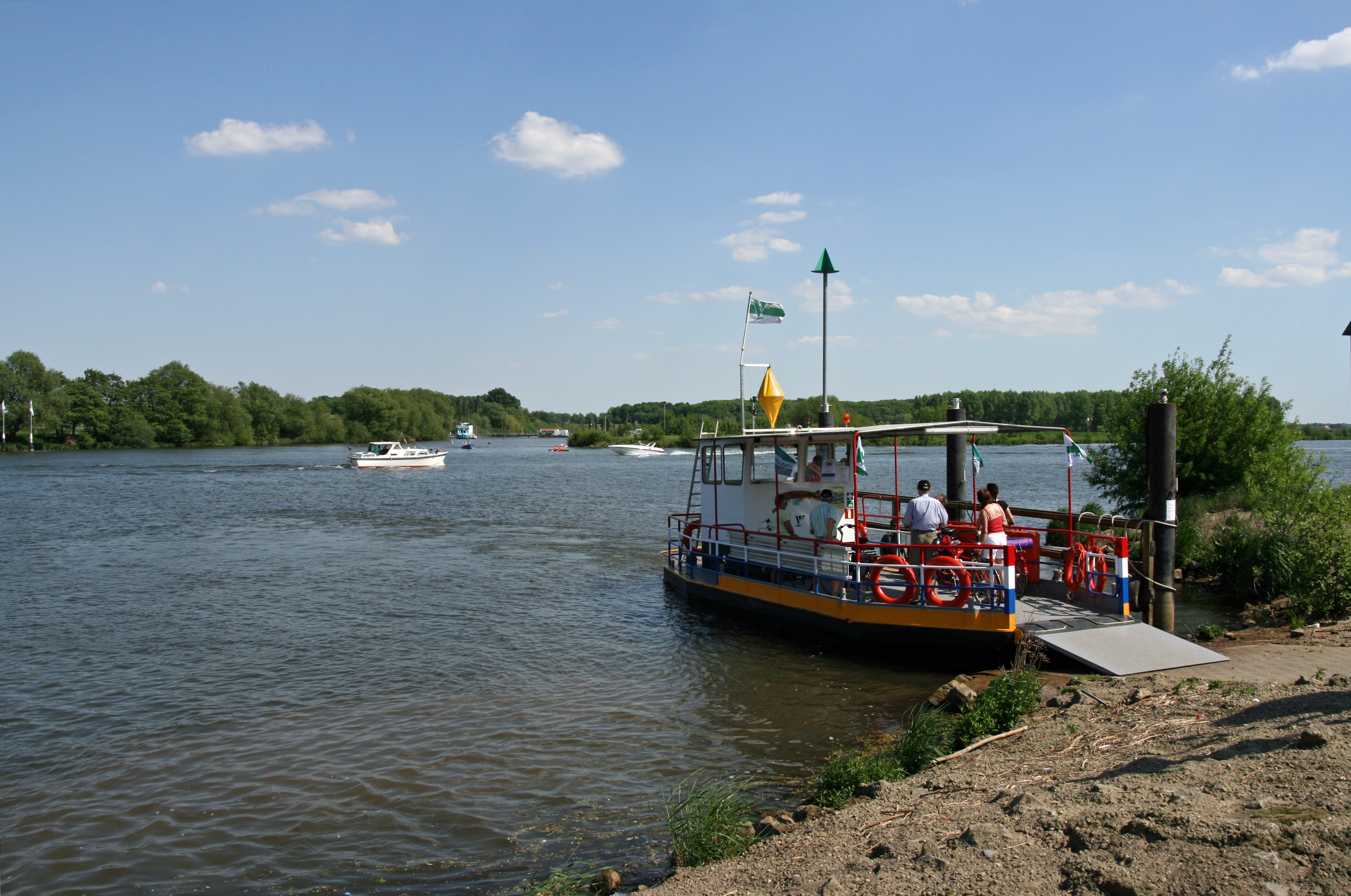
Ferry across the Maas

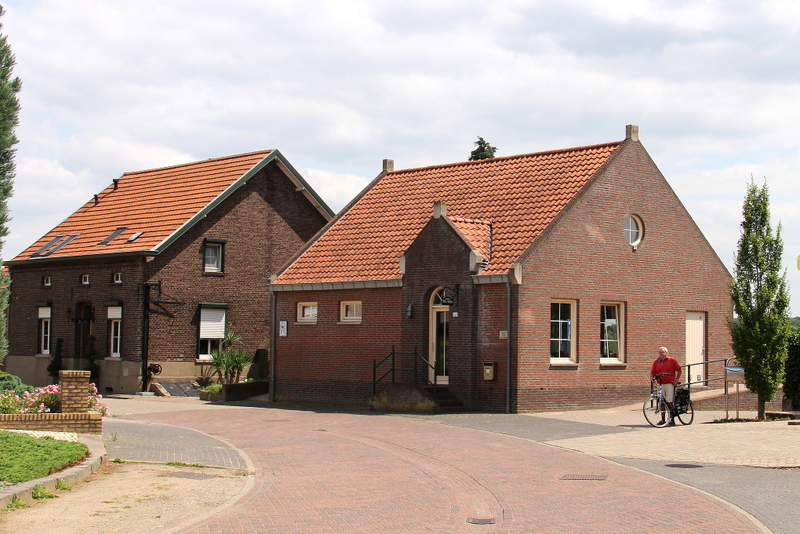
Former beer brewery

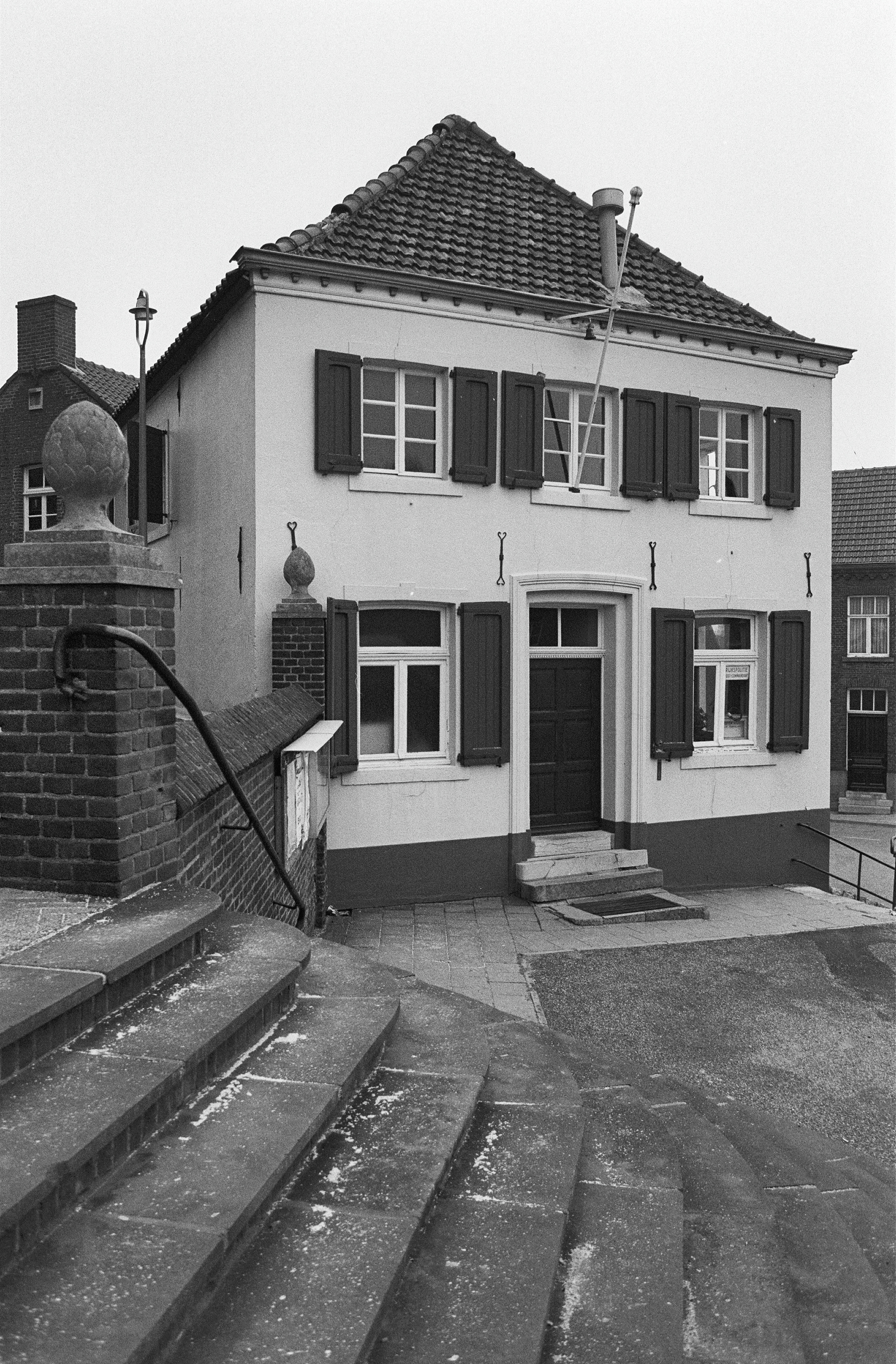
Former town hall
