= List of cities, towns and villages in Limburg (Netherlands) =

This is a list of settlements in the province of Limburg, in the Netherlands.

Name	Municipality	Coordinates
Aalbeek	Nuth	50°54′N 5°51′E
Aaldonk	Gennep	51°43′N 6°00′E
Aan de Berg	Roerdalen	51°06′N 5°59′E
Aan de Bergen	Leudal	51°16′N 5°53′E
Aan de Popelaar	Echt-Susteren	51°03′N 5°57′E
Aan de School	Echt-Susteren	51°04′N 5°58′E
Aan het Broek	Roerdalen	51°08′N 6°05′E
Aan Reijans	Echt-Susteren	51°03′N 5°56′E
Aasterberg	Echt-Susteren	51°06′N 5°51′E
Abdissenbosch	Landgraaf	50°55′N 6°02′E
Abshoven	Sittard-Geleen	50°58′N 5°51′E
Achter het Klooster	Leudal	51°15′N 5°53′E
Afferden	Bergen	51°38′N 6°01′E
Afhang	Horst aan de Maas	51°27′N 6°03′E
Aijen	Bergen	51°35′N 6°03′E
Altweert	Weert	51°14′N 5°42′E
Altweerterheide	Weert	51°13′N 5°41′E
Amby	Maastricht	50°52′N 5°44′E
America	Horst aan de Maas	51°26′N 5°59′E
Amstenrade	Schinnen	50°56′N 5°56′E
Annendaal	Roerdalen	51°06′N 6°02′E
Arcen	Venlo	51°29′N 6°11′E
Arensgenhout	Nuth	50°53′N 5°51′E
Asbroek	Leudal	51°17′N 5°54′E
Asenray	Roermond	51°12′N 6°03′E
Asselt	Roermond	51°14′N 6°01′E
Baakhoven	Echt-Susteren	51°04′N 5°50′E
Baarlo	Peel en Maas	51°20′N 6°06′E
Baarloseweg	Peel en Maas	51°20′N 6°01′E
Baarstraat	Maasgouw	51°10′N 5°51′E
Baexem	Leudal	51°14′N 5°53′E
Bakheide	Beesel	51°16′N 6°02′E
Baneheide	Simpelveld	50°49′N 5°59′E
Banholt	Eijsden-Margraten	50°47′N 5°49′E
Barrier	Voerendaal	50°53′N 5°54′E
Beegden	Maasgouw	51°11′N 5°55′E
Beek	Beek	50°56′N 5°48′E
Beek	Venray	51°32′N 5°57′E
Beersdal	Heerlen	50°54′N 5°58′E
Beertsenhoven	Gulpen-Wittem	50°50′N 5°53′E
Beesel	Beesel	51°16′N 6°02′E
Beitel	Heerlen	50°51′N 6°00′E
Belfeld	Venlo	51°19′N 6°07′E
Belgenhoek	Peel en Maas	51°22′N 5°55′E
Bemelen	Eijsden-Margraten	50°51′N 5°46′E
Benzenrade	Heerlen	50°52′N 5°59′E
Berg, Margraten	Eijsden-Margraten	50°50′N 5°45′E
Berg, Meijel	Peel en Maas	51°21′N 5°52′E
Berg, Valkenburg	Valkenburg aan de Geul	50°52′N 5°47′E
Berg aan de Maas	Stein	51°00′N 5°46′E
Bergen	Bergen	51°36′N 6°02′E
Bergenhuizen	Eijsden-Margraten	50°47′N 5°49′E
Berghem	Gulpen-Wittem	50°48′N 5°54′E
Bergsche Heide	Bergen	51°36′N 6°04′E
Berik	Leudal	51°14′N 5°58′E
Beringe	Peel en Maas	51°20′N 5°57′E
Beringerhoek	Peel en Maas	51°20′N 5°57′E
Berkelaar	Echt-Susteren	51°07′N 5°52′E
Beutenaken	Gulpen-Wittem	50°47′N 5°51′E
Billinghuizen	Gulpen-Wittem	50°48′N 5°52′E
Bingelrade	Onderbanken	50°59′N 5°56′E
Bisselt	Mook en Middelaar	51°46′N 5°55′E
Bissen	Gulpen-Wittem	50°47′N 5°54′E
Bleijenbeek	Bergen	51°38′N 6°03′E
Blenkert	Leudal	51°16′N 5°54′E
Blerick	Venlo	51°22′N 6°10′E
Blitterswijck	Venray	51°32′N 6°07′E
Bocholtz	Simpelveld	50°49′N 6°00′E
Bocholtzerheide	Simpelveld	50°49′N 6°00′E
Boddenbroek	Venray	51°31′N 6°03′E
Boekend	Venlo	51°23′N 6°07′E
Boekenderbos	Peel en Maas	51°19′N 6°02′E
Boeket	Nederweert	51°17′N 5°44′E
Bolenberg	Venlo	51°18′N 6°07′E
Bommerig	Gulpen-Wittem	50°47′N 5°56′E
Bong, Maasbree	Venlo	51°20′N 6°05′E
Bong, Velden	Venlo	51°26′N 6°10′E
Borgharen	Maastricht	50°53′N 5°41′E
Born	Sittard-Geleen	51°02′N 5°49′E
Boshoven	Weert	51°15′N 5°40′E
Boshuizen	Venray	51°32′N 6°00′E
Bosschenhuizen	Simpelveld	50°50′N 5°58′E
Bosscherheide	Bergen	51°34′N 6°05′E
Bosserstraat	Nederweert	51°18′N 5°45′E
Boukoul	Roermond	51°13′N 6°03′E
Bouwberg	Brunssum	50°57′N 6°00′E
Braakpeel	Nederweert	51°17′N 5°48′E
Brabander	Venray	51°32′N 5°58′E
Brachterbeek	Maasgouw	51°09′N 5°54′E
Brandemolen	Venlo	51°29′N 6°11′E
Brandt	Maasgouw	51°08′N 5°52′E
Broek	Gulpen-Wittem	50°47′N 5°55′E
Broek	Peel en Maas	51°18′N 6°03′E
Broek	Horst aan de Maas	51°27′N 6°04′E
Broekeind	Horst aan de Maas	51°26′N 6°09′E
Broekhem	Valkenburg aan de Geul	50°52′N 5°50′E
Broekhin	Roermond	51°12′N 6°00′E
Broekhoven	Meerssen	50°56′N 5°45′E
Broekhuizen	Landgraaf	50°55′N 6°04′E
Broekhuizen	Horst aan de Maas	51°29′N 6°10′E
Broekhuizenvorst	Horst aan de Maas	51°30′N 6°10′E
Broeksittard	Sittard-Geleen	51°00′N 5°53′E
Broekveld	Kerkrade	50°54′N 6°04′E
Brommelen	Nuth	50°54′N 5°55′E
Brommelen	Meerssen	50°55′N 5°44′E
Bruisterbosch	Eijsden-Margraten	50°48′N 5°48′E
Brumhold	Leudal	51°16′N 5°58′E
Brunssum	Brunssum	50°57′N 5°58′E
Buchten	Sittard-Geleen	51°03′N 5°49′E
Budschop	Nederweert	51°17′N 5°47′E
Buggenum	Leudal	51°14′N 5°59′E
Bulkemsbroek	Simpelveld	50°50′N 5°58′E
Bunde	Meerssen	50°53′N 5°44′E
Bussereind	Beesel	51°16′N 6°03′E
Cadier en Keer	Eijsden-Margraten	50°50′N 5°46′E
Californië	Venlo	51°25′N 6°07′E
Camerig	Vaals	50°46′N 5°56′E
Cartils	Gulpen-Wittem	50°49′N 5°54′E
Castenray	Venray	51°29′N 6°02′E
Catsop	Stein	50°57′N 5°47′E
Colmont	Voerendaal	50°51′N 5°56′E
Cottessen	Vaals	50°46′N 5°57′E
Crapoel	Gulpen-Wittem	50°48′N 5°53′E
Craubeek	Voerendaal	50°53′N 5°54′E
Dal	Gulpen-Wittem	50°47′N 5°54′E
Daland	Venray	51°32′N 5°55′E
Dam (Limburg)	Gennep	51°43′N 6°02′E
De Beekkant	Leudal	51°14′N 5°54′E
De Bramert	Stein	50°59′N 5°47′E
De Hamert	Bergen	51°30′N 6°10′E
De Hees	Horst aan de Maas	51°25′N 6°00′E
De Hei	Heerlen	51°29′N 6°09′E
De Horck	Leudal	51°14′N 5°53′E
De Horst	Weert	51°11′N 5°43′E
De Hut	?	50°49′N 5°52′E
Dekeshorst	?	51°20′N 6°01′E
De Kievit	?	51°21′N 5°56′E
De Kouk	?	51°15′N 5°54′E
De Krosselt	?	51°24′N 6°10′E
De Looi	?	51°42′N 6°01′E
Den Broek	?	51°23′N 6°02′E
De Nieuwe Hoeven	?	51°18′N 5°46′E
De Vorst	?	51°24′N 6°03′E
De Weerd	?	51°13′N 5°58′E
De Winkel	?	51°07′N 6°03′E
Diependal	?	50°46′N 5°55′E
Diergaarde	?	51°05′N 5°58′E
Dieteren	Echt-Susteren	51°05′N 5°51′E
Dijk	?	51°18′N 6°02′E
Dijkerstraat	?	51°14′N 5°41′E
Doenrade	Schinnen	50°58′N 5°54′E
Dolberg	?	50°53′N 5°53′E
Donk	?	51°19′N 6°04′E
Donk	?	51°20′N 5°53′E
Douvergenhout	Onderbanken	50°57′N 5°56′E
Dubbroek	Peel en Maas	51°21′N 6°05′E
Echt	Echt-Susteren	51°06′N 5°53′E
Echterbosch	?	51°04′N 5°59′E
Eckelrade	Eijsden-Margraten	50°48′N 5°46′E
Egchel	Peel en Maas	51°19′N 5°58′E
Egchelheide	?	51°18′N 5°58′E
Eijsden	Eijsden-Margraten	50°47′N 5°42′E
Eikelenbosch	?	51°29′N 6°05′E
Eikske	?	50°53′N 6°01′E
Eiland	?	51°08′N 5°52′E
Eind	?	51°15′N 5°55′E
Eind	?	51°17′N 5°47′E
Einde	?	51°14′N 6°01′E
Einighausen	Sittard-Geleen	51°00′N 5°50′E
Elkenrade	?	50°50′N 5°55′E
Ell	Leudal	51°13′N 5°48′E
Ellerhei	?	51°13′N 5°47′E
Elshout	?	51°30′N 6°05′E
Elsloo	Stein	50°57′N 5°46′E
Elsteren	?	51°33′N 6°05′E
Elzet	?	50°47′N 5°56′E
Emmaberg	?	50°53′N 5°51′E
Endepoel	?	51°32′N 5°57′E
Epen	Gulpen-Wittem	50°46′N 5°55′E
Eperheide	?	50°47′N 5°54′E
Etenaken	?	50°51′N 5°53′E
Etsberg	?	51°08′N 6°06′E
Etzenrade	?	50°59′N 5°58′E
Euverem	?	50°48′N 5°52′E
Everlo	?	51°20′N 5°59′E
Evertsoord	Horst aan de Maas	51°24′N 5°57′E
Eygelshoven	Kerkrade	50°54′N 6°03′E
Eys	Gulpen-Wittem	50°50′N 5°56′E
Eyserheide	Gulpen-Wittem	50°50′N 5°56′E
Fromberg	Voerendaal	50°51′N 5°54′E
Gasthuis	?	50°51′N 5°47′E
Gebroek	?	51°04′N 5°49′E
Gebroek	?	51°06′N 5°52′E
Gebroek	Echt-Susteren	51°11′N 6°00′E
Geleen	Geleen	50°58′N 5°50′E
Geloo	Venlo	51°19′N 6°08′E
Gendijk	?	51°15′N 5°59′E
Gening	?	51°38′N 6°02′E
Gennep	Gennep	51°42′N 5°58′E
Genooi	Venlo	51°24′N 6°10′E
Gerheggen	?	51°16′N 5°59′E
Geulhem	Valkenburg aan de Geul	50°52′N 5°47′E
Geulle	Meerssen	50°55′N 5°44′E
Geverik	Beek	50°56′N 5°47′E
Geysteren	Venray	51°33′N 6°03′E
Gracht	Kerkrade	50°51′N 6°02′E
Graetheide	?	51°01′N 5°48′E
Grashoek	Peel en Maas	51°22′N 5°57′E
Grathem	Leudal	51°12′N 5°52′E
Grevenbicht	Sittard-Geleen	51°02′N 5°47′E
Griendtsveen	Horst aan de Maas	51°26′N 5°54′E
Grijzegrubben	?	50°55′N 5°52′E
Grixhoek	?	51°11′N 5°42′E
Groeze	?	51°20′N 5°56′E
Gronsveld	Eijsden-Margraten	50°49′N 5°44′E
Groote Horst	Bergen	51°38′N 6°05′E
Groot-Genhout	?	50°56′N 5°50′E
Groot-Welsden	Eijsden-Margraten	50°50′N 5°49′E
Grubbenvorst	Horst aan de Maas	51°25′N 6°09′E
Gulpen	Gulpen-Wittem	50°49′N 5°54′E
Gun	Horst aan de Maas	51°30′N 6°07′E
Guttecoven	Sittard-Geleen	51°01′N 5°49′E
Haag	?	51°31′N 5°55′E
Haanrade	?	50°53′N 6°05′E
Haasdal	Nuth	50°53′N 5°49′E
Haelen	Leudal	51°14′N 5°57′E
Haelensche Broek	?	51°13′N 5°58′E
Haler	?	51°11′N 5°47′E
Hanik	?	51°27′N 6°12′E
Hanssum	?	51°16′N 6°00′E
Harles	?	50°47′N 5°59′E
Hasselderheide	Venlo	51°26′N 6°10′E
Hasselt, Venlo	Venlo	51°26′N 6°10′E
Hatenboer	Roermond	51°11′N 5°57′E
Heek	Voerendaal	50°53′N 5°52′E
Heel	Maasgouw	51°11′N 5°54′E
Heer	Maastricht	50°50′N 5°44′E
Heerlen	Heerlen	50°54′N 5°59′E
Heerlerbaan	?	50°52′N 6°00′E
Heerstraat	?	50°50′N 5°50′E
Hegelsom	Horst aan de Maas	51°26′N 6°02′E
Hegge	?	50°57′N 5°52′E
Hei	Weert	51°11′N 5°42′E
Heiakker	?	51°12′N 5°51′E
Heibloem	Leudal	51°18′N 5°54′E
Heide	?	50°57′N 5°47′E
Heide	?	51°04′N 5°52′E
Heide	?	51°13′N 5°56′E
Heide	Roermond	51°15′N 6°03′E
Heide	?	51°17′N 5°52′E
Heide	?	51°17′N 5°55′E
Heide	?	51°17′N 6°01′E
Heide	?	51°21′N 5°58′E
Heide	?	51°30′N 5°57′E
Heierhoeve	Horst aan de Maas	51°24′N 6°05′E
Heijen	Gennep	51°41′N 5°59′E
Heijenrade	?	50°46′N 5°52′E
Heikant	Mook en Middelaar	51°44′N 5°55′E
Heioord	?	51°10′N 5°47′E
Hei-Oostenrijk	?	51°29′N 6°03′E
Heisterbrug	?	50°57′N 5°53′E
Heksenberg	Heerlen	50°55′N 5°59′E
Helden	Peel en Maas	51°19′N 6°00′E
Heldensedijk	Peel en Maas	51°20′N 5°55′E
Helle	Gulpen-Wittem	50°47′N 5°56′E
Helle	Nuth	50°55′N 5°51′E
Hellebroek	?	50°55′N 5°54′E
Helling	?	51°32′N 6°05′E
Hengeland	?	51°39′N 6°00′E
Herkenbosch	Roerdalen	51°09′N 6°04′E
Herkenrade	?	50°48′N 5°47′E
Herongerberg	?	51°23′N 6°13′E
Hert	Peel en Maas	51°21′N 6°05′E
Herten	Roermond	51°11′N 5°58′E
Het Ven	Venlo	51°23′N 6°12′E
Het Vonderen	?	51°08′N 5°54′E
Het Vorst	?	51°25′N 6°09′E
Heukelom	Bergen	51°37′N 6°02′E
Heythuysen	Leudal	51°15′N 5°54′E
Hiept	?	51°32′N 5°57′E
Hilleshagen	?	50°48′N 5°57′E
Hingen	?	51°06′N 5°54′E
Hitsberg	?	51°02′N 5°47′E
Hobbelrade	?	50°56′N 5°50′E
Hoensbroek	Heerlen	50°55′N 5°56′E
Hof	Peel en Maas	51°21′N 5°53′E
Höfke	?	50°47′N 5°55′E
Hollander	Leudal	51°17′N 5°51′E
Holset	Vaals	50°47′N 6°00′E
Holst	?	51°08′N 6°03′E
Holtum	?	51°03′N 5°50′E
Homberg	Horst aan de Maas	51°28′N 6°09′E
Hommert	?	50°56′N 5°55′E
Hondsrug	?	50°51′N 5°59′E
Honthem	?	50°49′N 5°48′E
Hoog-Caestert	?	50°46′N 5°42′E
Hoogcruts	?	50°47′N 5°51′E
Hoogriebroek	?	51°30′N 6°01′E
Hopel	?	50°53′N 6°02′E
Horick	?	51°18′N 5°47′E
Horickheide	?	51°19′N 5°47′E
Horn	Leudal	51°13′N 5°57′E
Horst	Horst aan de Maas	51°27′N 6°03′E
Hout	Peel en Maas	51°18′N 6°05′E
Hout-Blerick	Venlo	51°22′N 6°08′E
Houtbroek	?	51°11′N 5°44′E
Houthei	Peel en Maas	51°22′N 6°04′E
Houthem	Valkenburg aan de Geul	50°52′N 5°46′E
Houthuizen	?	51°27′N 6°09′E
Hub	?	51°19′N 5°58′E
Huls	?	50°51′N 5°59′E
Hulsberg	Nuth	50°53′N 5°52′E
Hulsen	?	50°56′N 5°45′E
Hulsen	?	51°17′N 5°46′E
Humcoven	?	50°54′N 5°46′E
Hunnecum	?	50°55′N 5°52′E
Hunsel	Leudal	51°11′N 5°49′E
Hushoven	?	51°16′N 5°42′E
Husken	?	50°54′N 5°57′E
Hussenberg	?	50°56′N 5°46′E
IJsselsteyn	?	51°29′N 5°54′E
IJzeren	?	50°50′N 5°50′E
Illikhoven	?	51°04′N 5°49′E
Imstenrade	?	50°51′N 5°59′E
In de Hoeven	?	51°21′N 5°57′E
Ingber	?	50°49′N 5°52′E
Itteren	Maastricht	50°54′N 5°42′E
Ittervoort	Leudal	51°10′N 5°49′E
Jabeek	Onderbanken	50°59′N 5°56′E
Kaalheide	Kerkrade	50°52′N 6°03′E
Kakert	?	50°54′N 5°01′E
Kamp	Bergen	51°34′N 6°03′E
Kamp	Nuth	50°55′N 5°52′E
Kampershoek	?	51°16′N 5°44′E
Kapolder	?	50°50′N 5°54′E
Kappert	?	51°16′N 6°00′E
Karreveld	?	51°17′N 5°54′E
Kasen	Meerssen	50°54′N 5°45′E
Kastert	?	51°13′N 5°45′E
Katerbosch	?	51°44′N 5°55′E
Kathagen	?	50°56′N 5°54′E
Katsberg	?	51°20′N 5°54′E
Kaumershoek	?	51°20′N 5°58′E
Keent	?	51°14′N 5°42′E
Keizerbosch	Leudal	51°16′N 5°59′E
Kelmond	?	50°55′N 5°48′E
Kelpen	?	51°13′N 5°50′E
Kerensheide	?	50°58′N 5°47′E
Kerensheide	?	50°58′N 5°48′E
Kerkrade	Kerkrade	50°52′N 6°04′E
Kessel	Peel en Maas	51°18′N 6°03′E
Kesseleik	Peel en Maas	51°17′N 6°01′E
Keup	?	51°19′N 5°59′E
Keutenberg	?	50°51′N 5°53′E
Keuter	?	51°30′N 6°06′E
Kinkhoven	?	51°15′N 5°59′E
Kitskensberg	?	51°10′N 6°01′E
Klaarstraat	?	51°18′N 5°47′E
Kleeberg	?	50°47′N 5°55′E
Klein Berkelaar	?	51°07′N 5°52′E
Klein Doenrade	?	50°57′N 5°55′E
Kleindorp	?	51°32′N 5°56′E
Kleine-Horst	?	51°39′N 6°05′E
Kleine Meers	?	50°58′N 5°45′E
Klein Genhout	Beek	50°55′N 5°49′E
Klein Haasdal	Nuth	50°54′N 5°50′E
Klein-Oirlo	Venray	51°30′N 6°03′E
Klein-Welsden	Eijsden-Margraten	50°50′N 5°48′E
Klimmen	Voerendaal	50°53′N 5°53′E
De Kling	Brunssum	50°57′N 5°58′E
Knikkerdorp	Bergen	51°33′N 6°07′E
Koekoek	Bergen	51°39′N 6°04′E
Kokkelert	Echt-Susteren	51°05′N 5°48′E
Koningsbosch	Echt-Susteren	51°03′N 5°58′E
Koningslust	Peel en Maas	51°21′N 6°00′E
Korte Heide	Peel en Maas	51°22′N 6°03′E
Kosberg	Gulpen-Wittem	50°47′N 5°54′E
Koulen	Voerendaal	50°52′N 5°53′E
Kraan	Nederweert	51°16′N 5°45′E
Kreijel	Nederweert	51°17′N 5°46′E
Kronenberg	Horst aan de Maas	51°25′N 6°00′E
Kruis	Nuth	50°54′N 5°49′E
Kruisberg	?	51°17′N 6°02′E
Kunrade	Voerendaal	50°52′N 5°56′E
Kuttingen	Gulpen-Wittem	50°46′N 5°55′E
Laag-Caestert	?	50°46′N 5°42′E
Laagheide	?	51°21′N 6°00′E
Laagriebroek	?	51°30′N 6°00′E
Laak	Maasgouw	51°07′N 5°49′E
Laak	Leudal	51°16′N 5°55′E
Laar	?	51°17′N 5°43′E
Lakei	?	51°39′N 6°04′E
Landsrade	?	50°47′N 5°53′E
Lange Heide	Peel en Maas	51°22′N 6°04′E
Lange Hout	Peel en Maas	51°21′N 6°02′E
Langstraat	Peel en Maas	51°20′N 5°52′E
Lauradorp	?	50°54′N 6°05′E
Leemhorst	?	51°20′N 6°08′E
Leeuwen	Roermond	51°13′N 6°00′E
Leeuwen	Beesel	51°17′N 6°04′E
Leeuwerik	?	51°21′N 6°03′E
Leeuwstuk	?	50°56′N 5°57′E
Legert	?	51°30′N 6°08′E
Leijenbroek	?	50°59′N 5°52′E
Lemiers	Vaals	50°47′N 6°00′E
Lerop	?	51°10′N 5°59′E
Leuken	?	51°16′N 5°44′E
Leuken	?	51°34′N 6°04′E
Leunen	Venray	51°31′N 5°59′E
Leveroij	Leudal	51°15′N 5°51′E
Libeek	?	50°47′N 5°46′E
Limbricht	Sittard-Geleen	51°01′N 5°50′E
Lindenheuvel	Sittard-Geleen	50°59′N 5°49′E
Lingsfort	Venlo	51°29′N 6°12′E
Linne	Maasgouw	51°09′N 5°56′E
Locht	?	50°51′N 6°01′E
Lomm	Venlo	51°27′N 6°10′E
Loo	Peel en Maas	51°20′N 6°00′E
Loobeek	?	51°34′N 6°00′E
Lottum	Horst aan de Maas	51°28′N 6°10′E
Lovendaal	?	51°25′N 6°08′E
Maalbroek	Roermond	51°12′N 6°03′E
Maarland	?	50°48′N 5°43′E
Maasband	?	50°59′N 5°44′E
Maasbracht	Maasgouw	51°09′N 5°53′E
Maasbree	Peel en Maas	51°21′N 6°03′E
Maastricht	Maastricht	50°51′N 5°41′E
Mamelis	Vaals	50°48′N 5°58′E
Margraten	Eijsden-Margraten	50°49′N 5°49′E
Mariadorp	?	50°47′N 5°43′E
Mariahoop	?	51°05′N 5°58′E
Mariënwaard	?	50°52′N 5°43′E
Maris	?	51°21′N 5°56′E
Maxet	Leudal	51°15′N 5°52′E
Mechelen	Gulpen-Wittem	50°48′N 5°56′E
Meerlebroek	?	51°16′N 6°05′E
Meerlo	Horst aan de Maas	51°31′N 6°05′E
Meers	Stein	50°58′N 5°44′E
Meerssen	Meerssen	50°53′N 5°45′E
Megelsum	Horst aan de Maas	51°31′N 6°06′E
Meijel	Peel en Maas	51°21′N 5°53′E
Meijelsedijk	Nederweert	51°19′N 5°49′E
Melderslo	Horst aan de Maas	51°28′N 6°05′E
Melick	Roerdalen	51°10′N 6°01′E
Melleschet	?	50°47′N 5°57′E
Merkelbeek	Onderbanken	50°57′N 5°56′E
Merselo	Venray	51°32′N 5°56′E
Merum	?	51°10′N 5°58′E
Mesch	Eijsden-Margraten	50°46′N 5°44′E
Meterik	Horst aan de Maas	51°27′N 6°02′E
Mheer	Eijsden-Margraten	50°47′N 5°48′E
Middelaar	Mook en Middelaar	51°44′N 5°55′E
Middelijk	Horst aan de Maas	51°28′N 6°02′E
Mijnheerkens	?	51°12′N 6°00′E
Millert	?	51°15′N 5°48′E
Milsbeek	Gennep	51°44′N 5°57′E
Mingersberg	?	50°51′N 5°57′E
Moerslag	?	50°47′N 5°46′E
Moesdijk	?	51°15′N 5°44′E
Moesel	?	51°14′N 5°43′E
Moleneind	?	51°31′N 6°05′E
Molenhoek	?	51°30′N 6°03′E
Molenhoek	?	51°46′N 5°52′E
Molenhuizen	?	51°21′N 6°03′E
Molsberg	Simpelveld	50°51′N 5°59′E
Montfort	Roerdalen	51°07′N 5°57′E
Mook	Mook en Middelaar	51°45′N 5°53′E
Moorveld	?	50°55′N 5°45′E
Mortel	?	51°16′N 5°56′E
Most	Horst aan de Maas	51°23′N 6°01′E
Munstergeleen	Sittard-Geleen	50°59′N 5°52′E
Nabben	Venlo	51°20′N 6°08′E
Nachtegaal	?	51°31′N 6°08′E
Nagelbeek	?	50°56′N 5°52′E
Nattenhoven	?	51°01′N 5°47′E
Nederweert	Nederweert	51°17′N 5°45′E
Nederweerterdijk	Peel en Maas	51°20′N 5°50′E
Neer	Leudal	51°16′N 5°59′E
Neerbeek	Beek	50°57′N 5°49′E
Neeritter	Leudal	51°10′N 5°48′E
Nierhoven	?	50°55′N 5°52′E
Nieuw-Bergen	Bergen	51°36′N 6°03′E
Nieuwenhagen	Landgraaf	50°54′N 6°02′E
Nieuw- en Winnerstraat	?	51°18′N 5°46′E
Nieuw-Lotbroek	Heerlen	50°54′N 5°56′E
Nieuwstadt	Echt-Susteren	51°02′N 5°52′E
Nijken	?	51°17′N 5°55′E
Nijswiller	Gulpen-Wittem	50°48′N 5°57′E
Noorbeek	Eijsden-Margraten	50°46′N 5°49′E
Nuinhof	?	50°55′N 5°53′E
Nunhem	Leudal	51°15′N 5°58′E
Nuth	Nuth	50°55′N 5°53′E
Obbicht	Sittard-Geleen	51°02′N 5°47′E
Oensel	?	50°55′N 5°49′E
Oevereind	?	51°05′N 5°50′E
Offenbeek	Beesel	51°17′N 6°06′E
Offerkamp	?	51°10′N 5°58′E
Ohé	Maasgouw	51°07′N 5°51′E
Oirlo	Venray	51°31′N 6°02′E
Oirsbeek	Schinnen	50°57′N 5°54′E
Oler	?	51°13′N 5°50′E
Ooijen	?	51°31′N 6°09′E
Ool	?	51°11′N 5°57′E
Oost	Eijsden-Margraten	50°48′N 5°43′E
Oostbroek	?	50°55′N 5°47′E
Oostrum	Venray	51°32′N 6°01′E
Op de Belt	?	51°40′N 6°03′E
Op de Bies	?	50°55′N 5°50′E
Op de Bos	Leudal	51°15′N 5°56′E
Op de Hoven	?	50°55′N 6°04′E
Op den Hering	?	50°59′N 6°02′E
Ophoven	?	51°06′N 5°51′E
Ophoven	Leudal	51°16′N 5°57′E
Osen	?	51°10′N 5°55′E
Ospel	Nederweert	51°18′N 5°48′E
Osterbos	?	51°30′N 6°08′E
Ottersum	Gennep	51°42′N 5°59′E
Oudekerk	?	50°57′N 5°51′E
Oud-Roosteren	?	51°05′N 5°50′E
Oud-Valkenburg	Valkenburg aan de Geul	50°51′N 5°51′E
Oud-Vroenhoven	?	50°50′N 5°39′E
Overbroek	?	51°30′N 5°59′E
Overeys	?	50°50′N 5°57′E
Overgeul	?	50°48′N 5°55′E
Overhaelen	?	51°14′N 5°57′E
Overheek	Voerendaal	50°53′N 5°53′E
Oyen/Oijen	Peel en Maas	51°19′N 6°06′E
Paarlo	?	51°09′N 6°02′E
Panheel	Maasgouw	51°11′N 5°52′E
Panningen	Peel en Maas	51°20′N 5°59′E
Papenbeek	Bergen	51°33′N 6°05′E
Papenhoven	?	51°03′N 5°46′E
Partij	?	50°49′N 5°55′E
Pepinusbrug	?	51°05′N 5°56′E
Pesaken	?	50°48′N 5°52′E
Piepert	?	50°50′N 5°55′E
Plaat	?	50°46′N 5°55′E
Plasmolen	?	51°44′N 5°55′E
Platveld	?	51°19′N 5°52′E
Pol	?	51°10′N 5°54′E
Posterholt	Roerdalen	51°08′N 6°02′E
Prickart	?	50°50′N 6°00′E
Putbroek	?	51°06′N 5°59′E
Puth	Schinnen	50°57′N 5°52′E
Quabeek	?	50°58′N 5°56′E
Raaieind	?	51°24′N 6°09′E
Raar	?	50°53′N 5°47′E
Raath	?	50°58′N 5°56′E
Ransdaal	Voerendaal	50°52′N 5°54′E
Raren	?	50°46′N 6°00′E
Reijmersbeek	?	50°56′N 5°53′E
Reijmerstok	Gulpen-Wittem	50°48′N 5°50′E
Retersbeek	Voerendaal	50°53′N 5°55′E
Reuken	?	50°55′N 5°54′E
Reutje	Roerdalen	51°08′N 6°01′E
Reuver	Beesel	51°17′N 6°05′E
Riethorst	?	51°44′N 5°55′E
Rijckholt	Eijsden-Margraten	50°48′N 5°44′E
Rijkel	Beesel	51°15′N 6°01′E
Rimburg	Landgraaf	50°55′N 6°05′E
Rimpeld	?	51°38′N 6°02′E
Ringoven	?	50°57′N 5°50′E
Rinkesfort	Peel en Maas	51°20′N 6°04′E
Roer	?	51°11′N 5°59′E
Roermond	Roermond	51°12′N 6°00′E
Roeven	?	51°16′N 5°45′E
Roggel	Leudal	51°16′N 5°55′E
Roggelsedijk	?	51°19′N 5°53′E
Roligt	?	51°16′N 5°54′E
Rooskenskant	?	51°24′N 6°02′E
Roosteren	Echt-Susteren	51°05′N 5°49′E
Rooth	Peel en Maas	51°22′N 6°05′E
Roskam	?	51°08′N 6°00′E
Rothem	Meerssen	50°53′N 5°45′E
Rothenbach	?	51°09′N 6°07′E
Rott	?	50°47′N 5°57′E
Rozendaal	?	51°23′N 6°03′E
Santfort	?	51°11′N 5°51′E
Schaapsbrug	?	51°17′N 5°54′E
Schadijk	Horst aan de Maas	51°28′N 6°01′E
Schaesberg	Landgraaf	50°54′N 6°01′E
Schafelt	Peel en Maas	51°21′N 6°06′E
Schandelo	Venlo	51°26′N 6°11′E
Schans	?	51°16′N 5°55′E
Scharn	?	50°51′N 5°44′E
Schei	?	50°46′N 5°50′E
Scheide	?	51°30′N 5°58′E
Scheulder	Eijsden-Margraten	50°50′N 5°51′E
Schietecoven	?	50°54′N 5°46′E
Schilberg	?	50°46′N 5°51′E
Schillersheide	?	51°11′N 5°49′E
Schimmert	Nuth	50°55′N 5°50′E
Schinnen	Schinnen	50°57′N 5°53′E
Schin op Geul	Valkenburg aan de Geul	50°51′N 5°53′E
Schinveld	Onderbanken	50°58′N 5°59′E
Schippersbeek	?	51°03′N 5°48′E
Schoonbron	Valkenburg aan de Geul	50°51′N 5°53′E
Schoor	?	51°16′N 5°46′E
Schoor	?	51°30′N 6°00′E
Schoorveld	?	51°22′N 6°01′E
Schurenberg	?	50°55′N 5°55′E
Schweiberg	?	50°47′N 5°54′E
Sevenum	Horst aan de Maas	51°25′N 6°02′E
Sibbe	Valkenburg aan de Geul	50°51′N 5°50′E
Siebengewald	Bergen	51°39′N 6°06′E
Simonshoek	?	51°21′N 5°53′E
Simpelveld	Simpelveld	50°50′N 5°59′E
Sinselbeek	?	50°49′N 5°55′E
Sint Antoniusbank	?	50°51′N 5°46′E
Sint Geertruid	?	50°48′N 5°46′E
Sint Joost	Echt-Susteren	51°07′N 5°54′E
Sint Odiliënberg	Roerdalen	51°09′N 6°00′E
Sittard	Sittard-Geleen	51°00′N 5°52′E
Slenaken	Gulpen-Wittem	50°46′N 5°52′E
Smakt	?	51°34′N 6°00′E
Smal	?	51°37′N 6°03′E
Smidstraat	?	51°11′N 5°48′E
Smitzerveld	?	50°55′N 5°57′E
Snijdersberg	?	50°56′N 5°46′E
Soeterbeek	Peel en Maas	51°20′N 6°05′E
Spaanshuisken	?	51°02′N 5°58′E
Spaubeek	Beek	50°56′N 5°51′E
Spekholzerheide	Kerkrade	50°52′N 6°02′E
Spiesberg	?	51°22′N 5°56′E
Spik	?	51°12′N 6°02′E
Spurkt	?	51°17′N 6°02′E
Stalberg	Venlo	51°22′N 6°11′E
Steeg	Horst aan de Maas	51°24′N 6°01′E
Steegsbroek	?	51°29′N 5°57′E
Steenoven	Peel en Maas	51°20′N 5°52′E
Stein	Stein	50°58′N 5°46′E
Stevensweert	Maasgouw	51°08′N 5°51′E
Steyl	Venlo	51°20′N 6°07′E
Stogger	?	51°19′N 6°00′E
Stokhem	?	50°50′N 5°53′E
Stokt	?	51°29′N 6°09′E
Stox	Peel en Maas	51°20′N 6°00′E
Straat	?	51°11′N 6°02′E
Strabeek	?	50°52′N 5°49′E
Stramproy	Weert	51°12′N 5°43′E
Strateris	?	51°17′N 5°45′E
Strubben	?	51°16′N 5°55′E
Strucht	?	50°51′N 5°52′E
Susteren	Echt-Susteren	51°04′N 5°52′E
Swalmen	Roermond	51°14′N 6°02′E
Swartbroek	Weert	51°14′N 5°46′E
Sweikhuizen	?	50°57′N 5°51′E
Swier	?	50°54′N 5°54′E
Swolgen	Horst aan de Maas	51°30′N 6°07′E
Tegelen	Venlo	51°20′N 6°08′E
Ten Esschen	?	50°54′N 5°56′E
Terblijt	Valkenburg aan de Geul	50°51′N 5°47′E
Terhagen	?	50°57′N 5°45′E
Terhorst	?	50°47′N 5°49′E
Terlinden	?	50°47′N 5°50′E
Termaar	Eijsden-Margraten	50°49′N 5°50′E
Termaar	Voerendaal	50°52′N 5°53′E
Termoors	Voerendaal	50°52′N 5°54′E
Terpoorten	?	50°46′N 5°55′E
Terstraten	?	50°55′N 5°52′E
Tervoorst	?	50°55′N 5°52′E
Terwinselen	Kerkrade	50°52′N 6°02′E
Terziet	?	50°46′N 5°55′E
't Heeske	?	51°21′N 6°02′E
Thorn	Maasgouw	51°10′N 5°50′E
Thull	?	50°56′N 5°54′E
Thuserhof	?	51°11′N 6°03′E
Tienraij	Horst aan de Maas	51°30′N 6°06′E
Tongerlo	?	51°22′N 6°02′E
Tongerlo	?	51°26′N 6°02′E
Trintelen	?	50°50′N 5°57′E
't Rooth	Peel en Maas	50°50′N 5°47′E
Tuindorp	?	51°33′N 6°10′E
Tungelroy	Weert	51°13′N 5°44′E
Tusschen de Bruggen	?	51°08′N 6°05′E
't Vlut	?	51°18′N 5°47′E
Ubach over Worms	Landgraaf	50°55′N 6°03′E
Ubachsberg	Voerendaal	50°51′N 5°57′E
Uffelsen	?	51°11′N 5°48′E
Ulestraten	Meerssen	50°54′N 5°47′E
Ulfterhoek	?	51°25′N 6°03′E
Ulvend	?	50°46′N 5°50′E
Urmond	Stein	51°00′N 5°46′E
Vaals	Vaals	50°46′N 6°01′E
Vaesrade	?	50°56′N 5°54′E
Valkenburg	Valkenburg aan de Geul	50°52′N 5°50′E
Valkenhuizen	?	50°52′N 6°00′E
Veers	Peel en Maas	51°17′N 6°03′E
Veld	?	51°29′N 6°11′E
Velden	Venlo	51°25′N 6°10′E
Veld-Oostenrijk	Horst aan de Maas	51°28′N 6°03′E
Veldschuur	?	50°58′N 5°44′E
Venlo	Venlo	51°22′N 6°10′E
Venne	?	51°16′N 5°59′E
Venray	Venray	51°32′N 5°59′E
Ven-Zelderheide	Gennep	51°43′N 6°02′E
Vergelt	Peel en Maas	51°20′N 6°06′E
Veulen	?	51°29′N 5°57′E
Viel	?	50°58′N 5°55′E
Vieruitersten	?	51°21′N 5°54′E
Vijlen	Vaals	50°47′N 5°58′E
Vilgert	?	51°25′N 6°10′E
Vilt	Valkenburg aan de Geul	50°51′N 5°49′E
Vink	?	50°54′N 5°52′E
Vinkepas	?	51°24′N 6°03′E
Visserweert	?	51°04′N 5°48′E
Vlaas	?	51°16′N 5°58′E
Vlengendaal	?	50°49′N 6°00′E
Vliegert	?	51°22′N 5°58′E
Vlodrop	Roerdalen	51°08′N 6°05′E
Vlodrop-Station	Roerdalen	51°09′N 6°09′E
Voerendaal	Voerendaal	50°53′N 5°56′E
Volen	?	51°30′N 5°57′E
Voorst	Roerdalen	51°06′N 6°02′E
Voorste Hees	?	51°24′N 6°02′E
Voorsterveld	?	51°06′N 6°02′E
Voort	?	51°26′N 6°10′E
Vosberg	Peel en Maas	51°20′N 5°59′E
Voulwames	?	50°54′N 5°43′E
Vrakker	?	51°16′N 5°41′E
Vrank	?	50°54′N 5°57′E
Vredepeel	?	51°33′N 5°53′E
Vrij	?	51°40′N 6°04′E
Vroelen	?	50°46′N 5°49′E
Vroenhof	?	50°52′N 5°47′E
Vrusschemig	?	50°52′N 5°59′E
Waalbroek	?	50°50′N 6°00′E
Waatskamp	?	51°18′N 5°48′E
Waatskamperheide	?	51°18′N 5°48′E
Wahlwiller	Gulpen-Wittem	50°49′N 5°57′E
Waije	?	51°16′N 6°01′E
Walem	Valkenburg aan de Geul	50°52′N 5°52′E
Wanssum	Venray	51°32′N 6°05′E
Waterop	?	50°47′N 5°52′E
Waterval	?	50°54′N 5°47′E
Waubach	Landgraaf	50°55′N 6°03′E
Weerd	?	51°10′N 5°55′E
Weert	Weert	50°53′N 5°44′E
Weert	Weert	51°15′N 5°43′E
Well	Bergen	51°33′N 6°06′E
Wellerlooi	Bergen	51°32′N 6°08′E
Welten	Heerlen	50°53′N 5°58′E
Wessem	Maasgouw	51°10′N 5°53′E
Westbroek	?	50°55′N 5°44′E
Weustenrade	Voerendaal	50°54′N 5°55′E
Weverslo	?	51°31′N 5°56′E
Wieën	?	51°31′N 5°59′E
Wielder	?	51°23′N 6°08′E
Wielder	Horst aan de Maas	51°27′N 6°09′E
Wieler	Roermond	51°15′N 6°01′E
Wijlre	Gulpen-Wittem	50°50′N 5°54′E
Wijnandsrade	Nuth	50°54′N 5°53′E
Winthagen	Voerendaal	50°52′N 5°56′E
Wintraak	?	50°58′N 5°53′E
Witdonk	?	51°19′N 5°53′E
Withuis	?	50°46′N 5°43′E
Wittem	Gulpen-Wittem	50°49′N 5°55′E
Wolder	Maastricht	50°50′N 5°39′E
Wolfhaag	Vaals	50°46′N 6°00′E
Wolfhagen	?	50°57′N 5°53′E
Wolfshuis	?	50°51′N 5°48′E
Zandberg	Peel en Maas	51°20′N 6°01′E
Zandberg	Peel en Maas	51°21′N 6°04′E
Zandhoek	Venray	51°31′N 6°02′E
Zeelberg	?	51°32′N 6°09′E
Zelder	?	51°42′N 6°01′E
Zelen	?	51°20′N 5°58′E
Zittard	?	51°08′N 6°00′E
Zwanenheike	?	51°28′N 6°09′E
Zwarteklef	?	51°32′N 5°58′E
