= Bong, Venlo =

Bong, Venlo may refer to:

- Bong, Velden, a village in Venlo, the Netherlands
- Bong, Maasbree, a village in Venlo, the Netherlands

== See also ==
- Bong (disambiguation)
