= Krui =

Krui may refer to:

- Krui language, the language of the Indonesian province of Lampung, Sumatra
- Krui, Pesisir Barat Regency, Indonesia

== See also ==
- KRUI (disambiguation)
- Kruis, a surname
