= Wiehler =

Wiehler is a surname. Notable people with the surname include:

- Hans Wiehler (1930–2003), German botanist
- Zygmunt Wiehler (1890–1977), Polish composer and director

== See also ==
- Wiehle
- Wieler
