= Roskam =

Roskam is a Dutch surname. Notable people with the surname include:

- Arjan Roskam (born 1970), Dutch cannabis activist
- Catherine S. Roskam (born 1943), American Episcopal bishop
- Jan Roskam (1930–2022), Dutch-American aerospace engineer
- John Roskam, Australian public policy think tank director
- Mateo Roskam (born 1987), Croatian footballer
- Michaël R. Roskam (born 1972), Belgian film director
- Peter Roskam (born 1961), American politician from Illinois

== See also ==
- Roskam, Netherlands, a hamlet in Limburg
