= Berg, Meijel =

Berg
- Hamlet
- Location in the Netherlands Location in the province of Limburg in the Netherlands
- Coordinates: 51°20′42″N 5°51′40″E
- Country: Netherlands
- Province: Limburg
- Municipality: Peel en Maas

Area
  - Total: 3.27 km^{2} (1.26 sq mi)

Population (2021)
  - Total: 115
  - Density: 35.2/km^{2} (91.1/sq mi)
- Time zone: UTC+1 (CET)
  - Summer (DST): UTC+2 (CEST)
- Postal code: 5768
- Dialing code: 077

Berg (Dutch pronunciation: [ˈbɛr(ə)x]) is a hamlet in the Dutch province of Limburg. It is located in the municipality of Peel en Maas, about 2 km west of the center of that village. As of 2021, the population was 115.

Berg has no place name signs and consists of about 40 houses.
