= K-otic (Dutch band) =

Dutch pop group

- Origin: Netherlands
- Genres: Pop; dance-pop; Europop
- Years active: 2001–2003; 2016–present
- Label: Sony BMG
- Members: Rachel Kramer; Stefan de Roon; Anna Speller; Martijn Terporten; Bouchra Tjon Pon Fong; Bart Voncken; Sita Vermeulen

K-otic (meaning: chaotic) are a Dutch pop group that originated from the television program Starmaker. The group originally consisted of Rachel Kramer, Bouchra Tjon Pon Fong, Anna Speller, Sita Vermeulen, Bart Voncken, Stefan de Roon and Martijn Terporten. Vermeulen left the group at the end of 2001. In 2003, the group was dissolved due to decreasing success. They met again at the end of 2015 to organize a one-off concert in 2016.

== History ==
=== 2001: Formation, Bulletproof and Vermeulen's first departure ===
In Starmaker, an idea of John de Mol, a group of 12 youngsters with musical talent moved into the former Big Brother house in Almere with the intention of eventually forming a new six-member pop group. From the beginning of March to the end of May 2001, the participants attended many types of workshops here and were guided by professionals such as Ad Vandenberg, Florent Luyckx and Tjeerd Oosterhuis . Every week a participant was sent home by the viewers. The initial plan was to create a group consisting of six members. However, during the final Sita and Rachel gained an equal number of votes and so it was decided to form the final group with the seven remaining candidates. In addition to the occupation, the group's name K-otic was also chosen by the viewers.

The debut album Bulletproof was released immediately after the end of Starmaker and came in first place a week after the last broadcast in the Album Top 100. It was the best-selling album of 2001 in the Netherlands, followed by Alessandro Safina's Insieme a te and Not That Kind by Anastacia. In the 2000-2009 decade overview, the CD ranked 18th place. More than 235,000 units of Bulletproof were sold, good for twice platinum. The singles "I Can't Explain", "I Really Don't Think So" and "No Perfect World" all became hits in the Dutch Top 40 and the Mega Top 100.

From September 2001, K-otic did an extensive Dutch tour in venues such as Paradiso and Nighttown. After U2 and Bon Jovi, K-otic was the most visited live act that year. The group also won a Top of the Pops Award in the category Top TV Music Act.

Sita Vermeulen left the group at the end of 2001 to start a solo career. Already during Starmaker, she was appointed by the makers to go solo. However, due to the group's success, it was decided to postpone this. The other members decided to continue as sextet.

=== 2002–2003: Indestructible and Dissolution ===
At the beginning of April 2002, K-otic went into the studio for the second album, Indestructible. The first single "Falling" was released at the end of May 2002 and again became a top 40 hit, just like the successor "I Surrender", which was released in August. The album sold a lot less than its predecessor, but nevertheless achieved gold status.

The performance on September 28 in Tivoli in Utrecht was one of the few the group gave that year. The success declined further and the group decided to disband. Several group members had already indicated for a while that they were not comfortable with the music and style of the group. Their last concert was on January 26, 2003 in Bob's Saloon in Uitgeest.

=== 2011–present: Reunion ===
In 2011, the group met privately for the first time again in eight years. The group officially reunited in 2016. Through a TV performance at Carlo's TV Café in March, a crowdfunding campaign quickly raised the money needed for a one-off reunion concert. A small hall was initially thought of, but the interest was so great that in December 2016 K-otic returned after 15 years to the Heineken Music Hall, where the group started in 2001. The reunion was also used for a six-part documentary series that appeared on YouTube at the end of 2016.

== Discography ==
- Bulletproof (2001)
- Indestructible (2002)

== Members ==
- Rachel Kramer (2001-2003;2016–present)
- Bart Voncken (2001-2003;2016–present)
- Stefan de Roon (2001-2003;2016–present)
- Anna Speller (2001-2003;2016–present)
- Bouchra Tjon Pon Fong (2001-2003;2016–present)
- Martijn Terporten (2001-2003;2016–present)
- Sita Vermeulen (2001;2016–present)
