= Wiehle =

Wiehle is a surname. Notable people with the surname include:

- Ernst Wiehle (1894–?), German World War I flying ace
- Hermann Wiehle (1884–1966), German teacher and arachnologist
- Martin Wiehle (1926–2023), German historian
- Wolfgang Wiehle (born 1964), German politician

== See also ==
- Wiehler
- Wiehle–Reston East station
