= Straat =

Straat or Strååt is a surname. Notable people with the surname include:

- Hans Strååt, Swedish actor
- Patricia Ann Straat (1936–2020), American space scientist
- Sophie Straat (born 1994), Dutch singer
- Xander Straat (born 1965), Dutch actor

== Other ==
- Prinsen Straat
- STRAAT Museum, Street art museum in Amsterdam, Netherlands
