= Nederweerterdijk =

- Hamlet
- Location in the Netherlands Location in the province of Limburg in the Netherlands
- Coordinates: 51°20′9″N 5°50′35″E
- Country: Netherlands
- Province: Limburg
- Municipality: Peel en Maas

Area
  - Total: 3.27 km^{2} (1.26 sq mi)

Population (2021)
  - Total: 115
  - Density: 35.2/km^{2} (91.1/sq mi)
- Time zone: UTC+1 (CET)
  - Summer (DST): UTC+2 (CEST)
- Postal code: 5768
- Dialing code: 077

Nederweerterdijk is a hamlet in the Dutch province of Limburg. It is located in the municipality of Peel en Maas, about 3 km west of the center of that village.

Nederweerterdijk has no place sign names and consists of about 25 houses, with a population of 115 (2021).
