= Martyn Mazz =

Dutch artist and songwriter (born 1983)

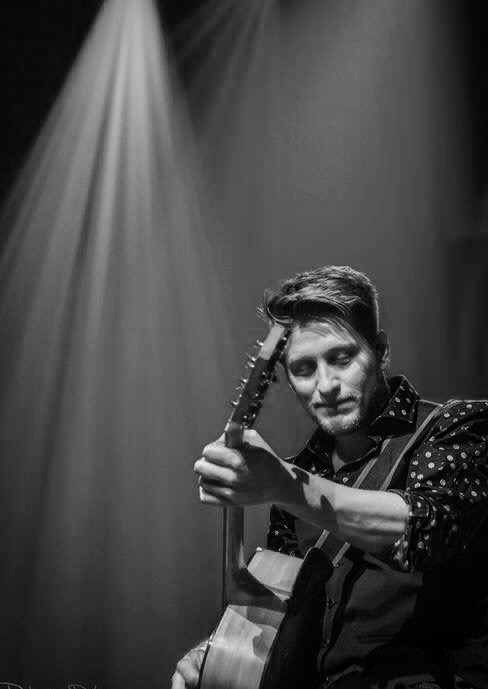
- Martyn Mazz performing in 2016

Background information
- Also known as: Martin Porter, Martijn Terporten
- Born: Martijn Hubertus Johannes Terporten; October 13, 1983 (age 42); Maasbree, Netherlands
- Genres: Alternative rock, pop, dance-pop, pop rock, R&B, hard rock
- Occupations: Singer-songwriter, musician
- Instruments: Vocals, guitar, piano
- Years active: 1996–present
- Labels: Jive Records, Sony BMG, Zomba Records, Retone Records
- Website: martynmazz.com

Martyn Mazz (born Martijn Hubertus Johannes Terporten on October 13, 1983) is a Dutch artist and songwriter who was the lead vocalist in Van Gunn (2004–2008), 7 Days' Wonder (2009), primarily known as a singer in K-otic (2001–2003) and currently active solely as a songwriter.

== Career ==
Mazz grew up in Maasbree, Netherlands.

Growing up with music such as the Beatles, Rolling Stones, Tom Petty and Thin Lizzy mainly caused by his parents' influence, and later, on the verge of the crossover from 1980s glamrock and 1990s grunge, getting a taste of those both worlds mainly through (according to his own biography) sneaking his way to his sisters' record shelf.

Since all this music was in English, at a young age he had developed an interest in lyrics and through reading lyrics at the same time learned his English.

In 2001, Mazz (at the time still known as Martijn Terporten) was selected to join a TV show called Starmaker in the Netherlands. The show was a pioneer in reality talent shows and through the TV show he ended up in a pop group called K-otic. However, since Martyn has always listened to rock and hard rock, Martyn has stated that being in this group felt unnatural for him. That's why he took his first possible ticket out, which because of contracts was not until their last performance on January 26, 2003.

In the meanwhile Martyn always kept close ties with his original band Van Gunn. They decided to move to Los Angeles to get more experience and to get on the road. In 2006 Van Gunn signed with Retone Records and recorded an album in Los Angeles. That album was their take off, however the band broke up due to differences in taste and how to move forward.

In 2008 Martyn moved to Rotterdam to start a study at a University for Music. While studying at the University, Porter formed a band called 7 Days' Wonder with whom he recorded a five song EP and toured in Japan and the Netherlands. In its short existence 7 Days' Wonder did not achieve any commercial success.

In September 2010 Martyn moved back to Los Angeles, where Martyn was mostly active as a songwriter and producer for other artists.

In 2017 Martyn moved to Nashville, and in 2019 announced on his social media outlets and website that he will be using Martyn Mazz as his new stage name.

== Discography ==
- Van Gunn – Van Gunn (Retone Records 2007)
- 7 Days' Wonder – Phenomena (Evil Distortion Records 2009)
- K-otic

Album title	Release date	Charting in the Dutch Album Top 100			Comments
Album title	Release date	Date of entry	Highest	Weeks	Comments
Bulletproof	2001	June 2, 2001	1	32	Platinum
Live and more	2001	August 11, 2001	39	4	Live album / CD & DVD
Indestructible	2002	September 21, 2002	2	16	Gold
