= Prinsen Straat =

Prinsen Straat, or Prince Street in English, was one of the busiest main streets in Batavia, Dutch East Indies where business and trade took place. It is now called Jalan Cengkeh in Jakarta. Jalan Cengkeh is located in the main area surrounding Kota Tua.

== Colonial era ==
Standing on Prinsen Straat, the Amsterdamsche Poort (Amsterdam Gate) can be seen from a distance.

In 1867, Dutch photographer Jacobus Anthonie Meesen immortalized through a photo Prinsen Straat with the Amsterdam Gate in the background. He took pictures from the intersection of Prinsen Straat, Pasar Pisang (Banana Market), and Leeuwinnen Straat (now Jalan Cengkeh, Jalan Kalibesar Timur 3, and Jalan Kunir). The position of the Amsterdam Gate faces the stadhuis or town hall, which is now the Jakarta History Museum.

Immigrants from Europe who visited Batavia by sea before 1885, before the port of Tanjung Priok was completed, would dock at the port of Sunda Kelapa and continue along the southern side of Prinsen Straat. They continue southward towards Weltevreden (now Sawah Besar). In the 1860s, Prinsen Straat was one of the busiest streets with business and trade activities constantly taking place during the day. At night, the area is generally deserted because most European workers prefer to live in the fancier part of town, Weltevreden.

Until the 20th century, the Prinsen Straat area was filled with European offices, warehouses and industrial buildings. The Amsterdamsche Poort, wrote Scott Merrllees in his book Batavia in The Nineteenth Century Photographs, was the only relic of Batavia Castle destroyed by Herman Willem Daendels in ca. 1808–1809. The Amsterdamsche Poort formed the southern entrance to Batavia Castle Square and is located on the north side of the stadhuis or town hall (now Jakarta History Museum).
