= Egchel =

- Village
- Location in the Netherlands Location in the province of Limburg in the Netherlands
- Coordinates: 51°18′50″N 5°58′14″E
- Country: Netherlands
- Province: Limburg
- Municipality: Peel en Maas

Area
  - Total: 5.65 km^{2} (2.18 sq mi)
- Elevation: 34 m (112 ft)

Population (2021)
  - Total: 1,250
  - Density: 221/km^{2} (573/sq mi)
- Time zone: UTC+1 (CET)
  - Summer (DST): UTC+2 (CEST)
- Postal code: 5987
- Dialing code: 077

Egchel is a village in the Dutch province of Limburg. It is a part of the municipality of Peel en Maas, and lies about 14 km north of Roermond.

The village was first mentioned in 1405 as Heynchen van Aygel. The etymology is unknown.

Egchel was home to 195 people in 1840. The Catholic St Jacobus de Meerdere Church was built in 1948. The population was 1,250 in 2021.
