= Strucht =

- Hamlet
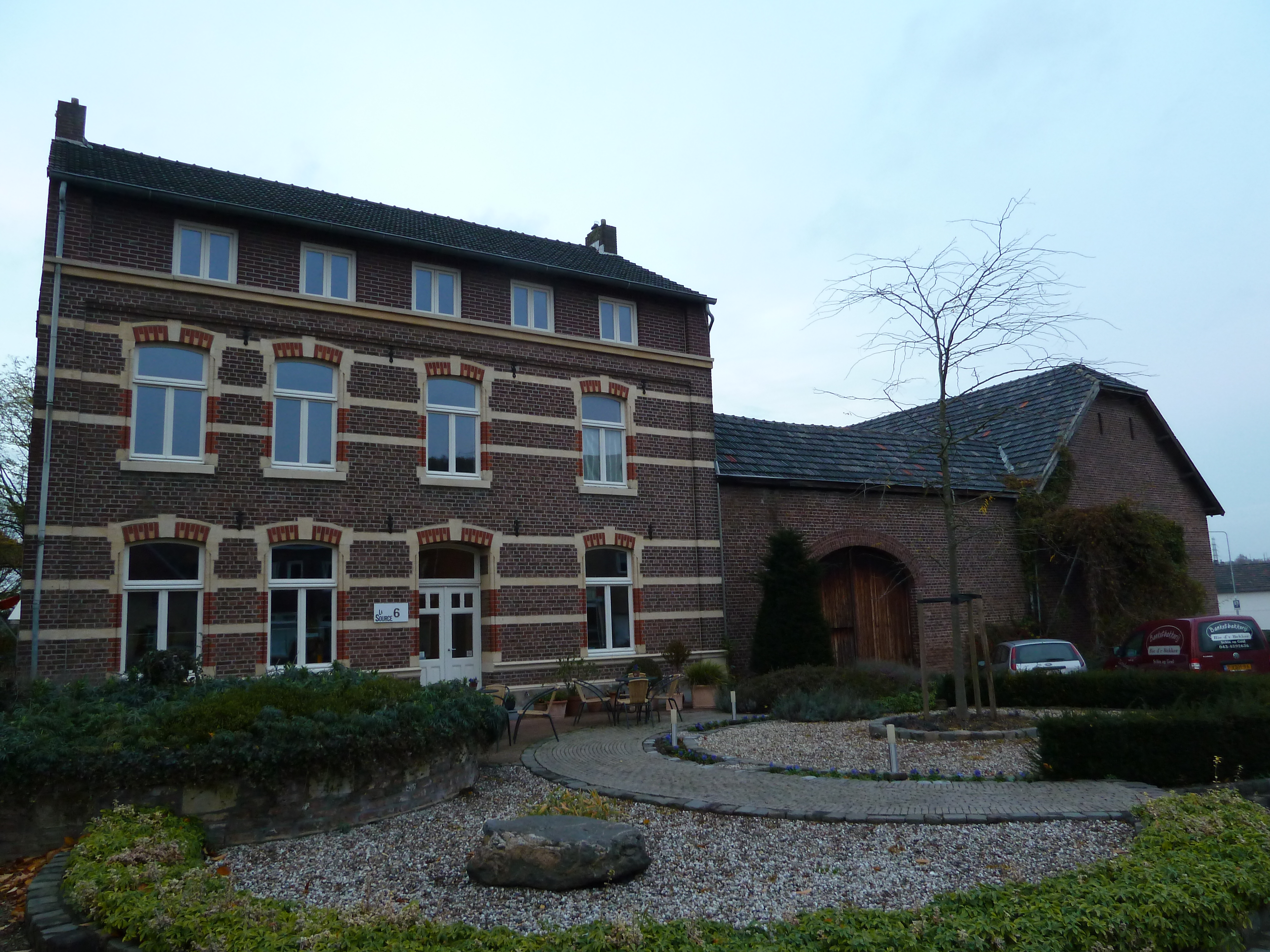

- Location in the Netherlands Location in the province of Limburg in the Netherlands
- Coordinates: 50°51′N 5°52′E
- Country: Netherlands
- Province: Limburg
- Municipality: Valkenburg aan de Geul

Area
  - Total: 0.20 km^{2} (0.077 sq mi)
- Elevation: 75 m (246 ft)

Population (2021)
  - Total: 365
  - Density: 1,800/km^{2} (4,700/sq mi)
- Time zone: UTC+1 (CET)
  - Summer (DST): UTC+2 (CEST)
- Postal code: 6305
- Dialing code: 043

Strucht is a hamlet in the Dutch province of Limburg. It is located in the municipality of Valkenburg aan de Geul.

The hamlet was first mentioned in 1603 as Strucht, and means "settlement with shrubbery". It used to belong to the Austrian Netherlands, but was traded with the Dutch Republic in 1785. Strucht was home to 264 people in 1840.

Strucht was a separate municipality until 1879, when it was merged with Schin op Geul. In 1982, it became part of the municipality of Valkenburg aan de Geul.
