= Oler =

Oler or Olers is a surname. Notable people with the surname include:

- Kim Oler, American television and theatrical composer
- Wesley Oler (1891–1980), baseball player and track and field athlete
- Jessica Olérs (born 1978), former Miss Sweden
- David Oler (1902–1985), artist
