= Eiland =

Eiland is a surname. Notable people with the surname include:

- Craig Eiland (born 1962), Democrat and Speaker pro Tempore of the Texas House of Representatives
- Dave Eiland (born 1966), pitcher in Major League Baseball
- Deandre' Eiland (born 1982), American football player
- Giora Eiland (born 1952), Major General (ret.), Israel Defense Forces

== See also ==
- De Laatste Dagen van een Eiland, 1942 Dutch film directed by Ernst Winar
- Driekops Eiland, rock engraving or petroglyph site in the bed of the Riet River near Plooysburg, near Kimberley, Northern Cape, South Africa
- Beck v. Eiland-Hall concerns the spoof website entitled DidGlennBeckRapeAndMurderAYoungGirlIn1990
- Stoelmans Eiland Airstrip (IATA: SMZ, ICAO: SMST), near Stoelmans Eiland, Suriname

Media related to Eiland (surname) at Wikimedia Commons
