= Amsterdam Gate, Jakarta =

Coordinates: 6.1308°S 106.8120°E

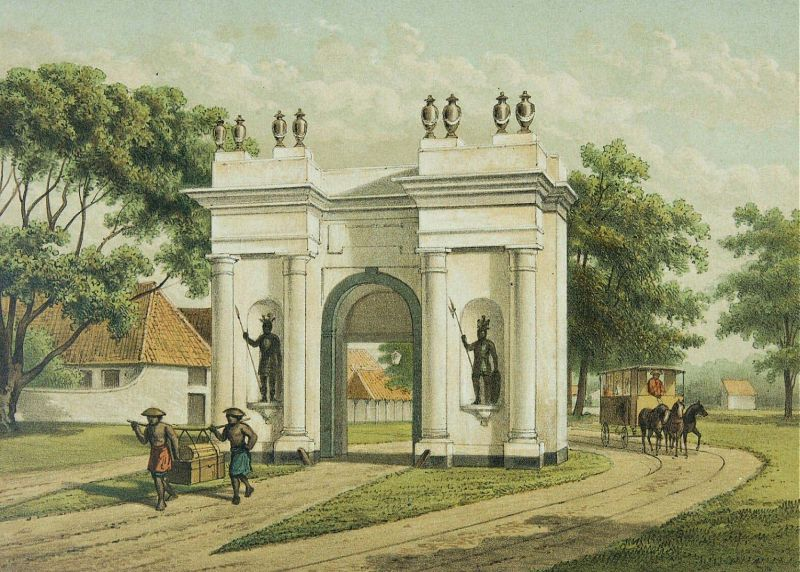
Lithograph of the gate c.1881–1889

The Amsterdam Gate (Dutch: Amsterdamse Poort) formed the entrance to the Castle Square (Dutch: Kasteelplein) south of Batavia Castle. The gate existed from 1744 up to the 1950s in what is now known as Kota, Jakarta, where it would have stood near the intersection of Jalan Nelayan Timur and Jalan Cengkeh.

== History ==
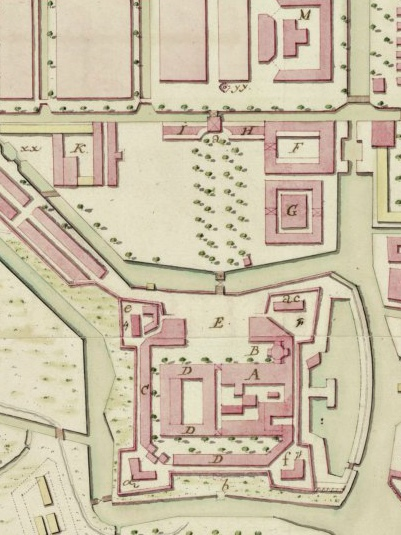
Map of the Castle in 1762, showing the removed original wall (E) and the new gate (a, between I and H). The top is south.

Amsterdam Poort was first built in the 17th century.

During the rule of governor-general Gustaaf Willem, Baron van Imhoff between 1743 and 1750, the castle of Batavia was expanded. Among the involved works was the demolition of the fort's original southeast wall. A new southeast wall was built further south along the Amsterdamse Gracht (current day Nelayan Timur street), thereby including the Castle Square within the castle grounds. The newly build gate was changed to Rococo style. The entrance through the new wall was formed by a gatehouse of two storeys high and topped with a dome and clock. Part of this building was used as a prison, in a similar fashion as the Gevangenpoort in The Hague.

Owing to its location at the Amsterdamse Gracht, the gate was called the Amsterdamse Poort. Other names include Pinangpoort (English: Pinang Gate, after the trade in pinang that took place there) and Kasteelpoort (English: Castle Gate).

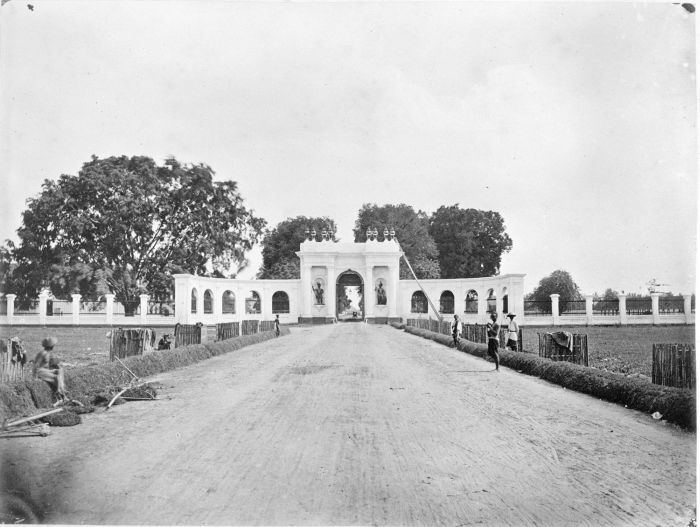
The gate surrounded by arcades.

In 1808, governor-general Daendels commissioned the relocation of the seat of government to Weltevreden. The construction works there were supplied partially by reusing building material from the Castle of Batavia. Most buildings on the castle grounds had been demolished, save for a part of the Amsterdam gate and connected arcades. The arched wing of the gate was connected to the building that formed part of the fort.

When Daendels destroyed the castle, only this gate remained. In the 1840s, the gate was rebuilt with Mars and Minerva statues mounted on the left and right sides of the gates like a pair of guards.

The gate was then reduced further to its final form, after the arcades were removed around 1870 in order to provide passage to a tramway. This gate existed until the 1950s, when the last remnants were removed.

In 2007, a replica of the gate was proposed as part of heritage conservation measures of Kota, Jakarta.

== Architecture ==
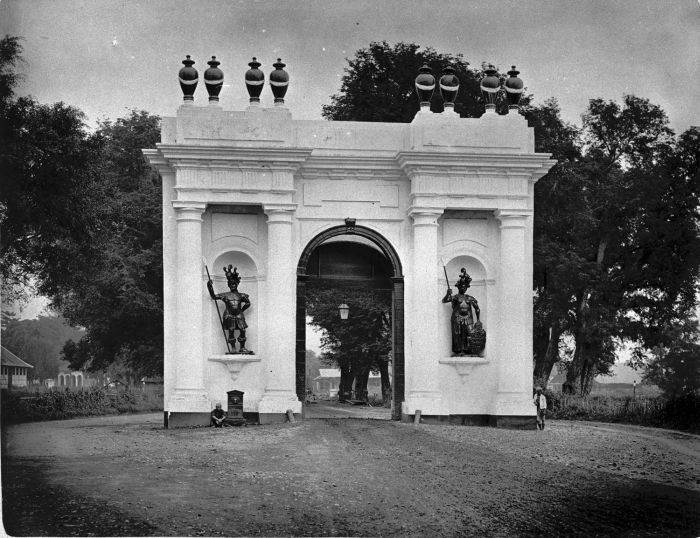
The gate around 1885

The gate was originally part of a baroque gatehouse, large enough to accommodate a small prison. The gatehouse had two storeys and was covered by a dome with a cupola on top. Semi-circular arcades connected the gatehouse to two flanking military buildings.

The remains of the gate after the demolitions of Daendels only counted one storey. The gateway had a rounded arch and was decorated with columns. On top of the gate were eight black urns. The south facade had two niches containing statues of Mars and of Minerva. These statues disappeared during the Japanese occupation in World War II.

== See also ==
- List of colonial buildings and structures in Jakarta
