= Gebroek =

- Hamlet
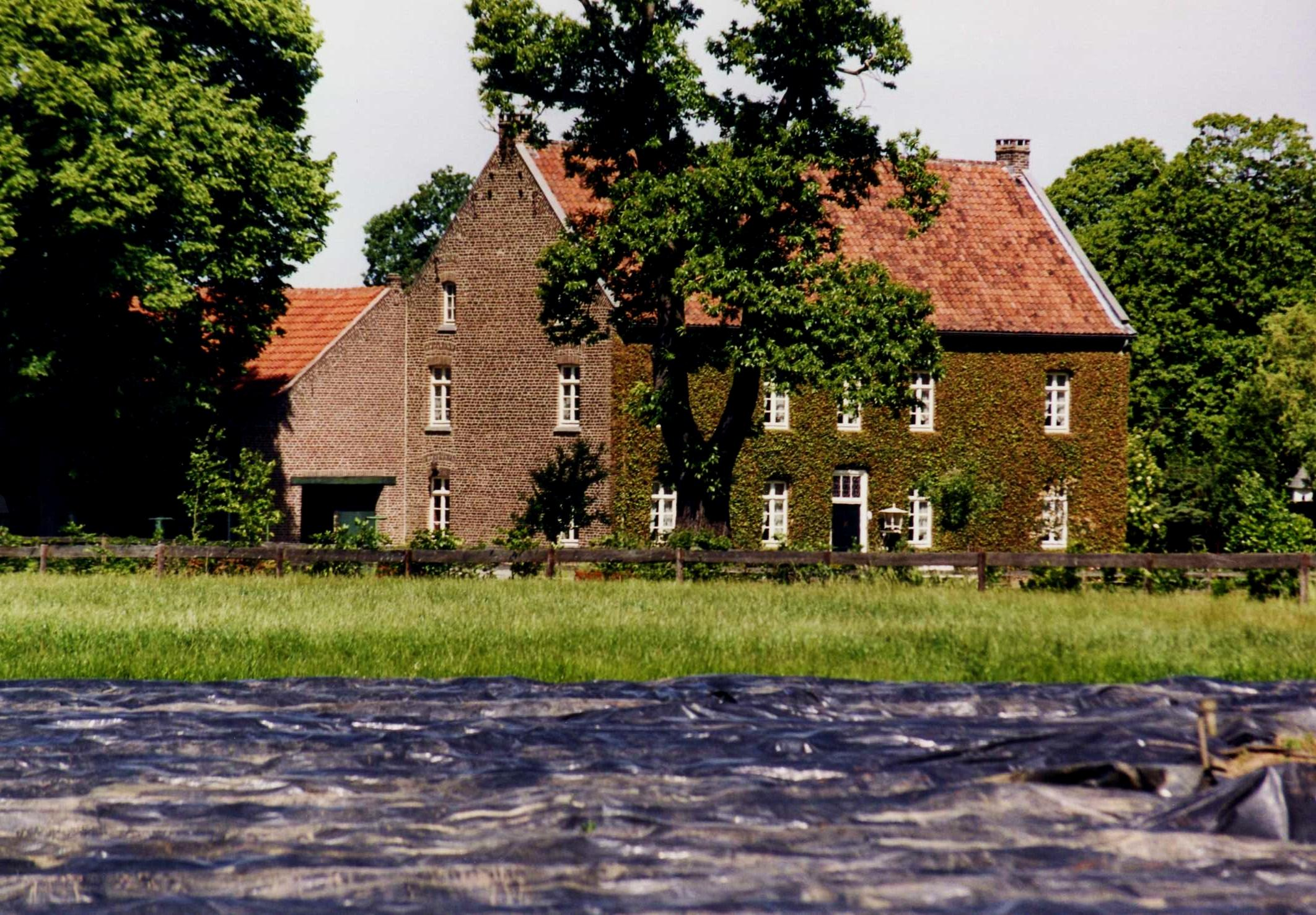
- Farm De Horst

- Location in the Netherlands Location in the province of Limburg in the Netherlands
- Coordinates: 51°4′6″N 5°49′35″E
- Country: Netherlands
- Province: Limburg
- Municipality: Echt-Susteren

Area
  - Total: 0.15 km^{2} (0.058 sq mi)
- Elevation: 26 m (85 ft)

Population (2021)
  - Total: 225
  - Density: 1,500/km^{2} (3,900/sq mi)
- Time zone: UTC+1 (CET)
  - Summer (DST): UTC+2 (CEST)
- Postal code: 6101
- Dialing code: 0475

Gebroek (Limburgish: Gebrook) is a hamlet in the Dutch province of Limburg. It is a part of the municipality of Echt-Susteren, and lies about 11 km north of Sittard.

The hamlet was first mentioned around 1700 as Broich, and means "swampy land". Gebroek was home to 150 people in 1840.

== Gallery ==
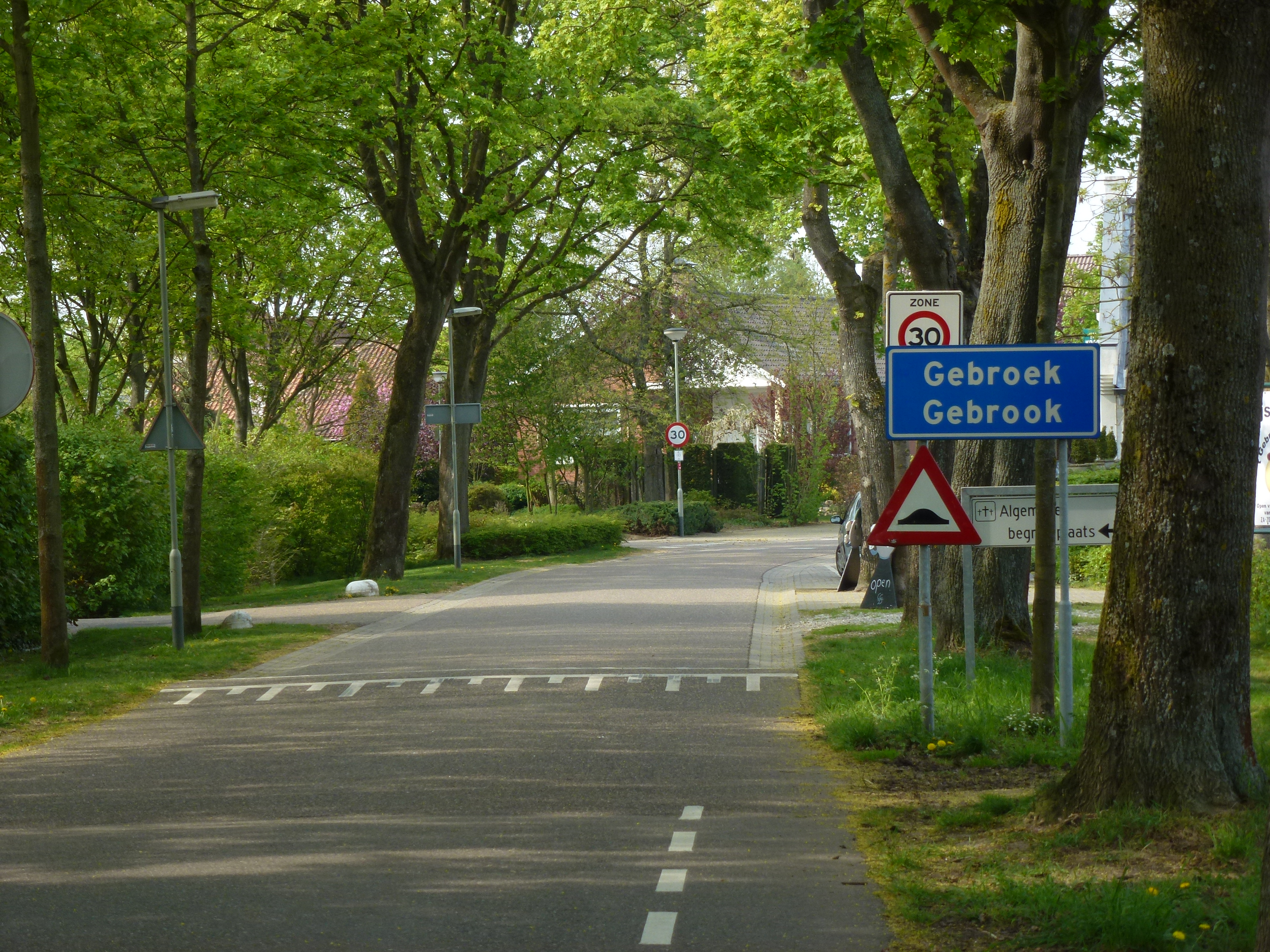

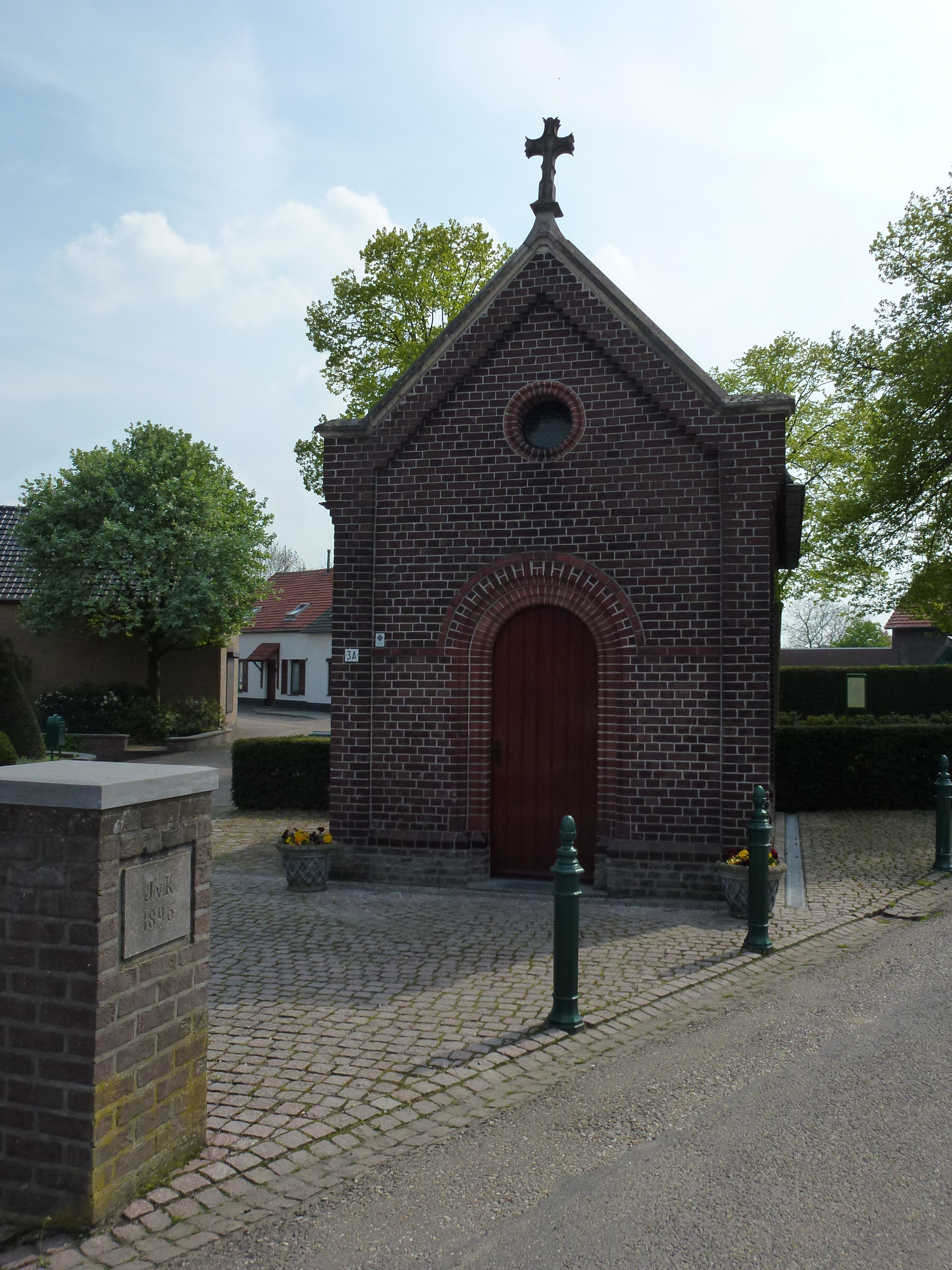
St Anna Chapel
