= Vosberg =

Vosberg is a surname. Notable people with the surname include:

- Don Vosberg (1919–1997), American football player
- Ed Vosberg (born 1961), American baseball player
