= Bong, Maasbree =

Bong
- Hamlet
- Location in the Netherlands Location in the province of Limburg in the Netherlands
- Country: Netherlands
- Province: Limburg
- Municipality: Peel en Maas

Area
  - Total: 1.12 km^{2} (0.43 sq mi)

Population (2021)
  - Total: 715
  - Density: 638/km^{2} (1,650/sq mi)
- Time zone: UTC+1 (CET)
  - Summer (DST): UTC+2 (CEST)
- Postal code: 5991
- Dialing code: 077

Bong (Dutch pronunciation: [bɔŋ]) is a hamlet in the Dutch province of Limburg. It is located in the municipality of Peel en Maas, about 1 km west of Baarlo.
