= Etsberg =

Etsberg Ètsberg
- Hamlet
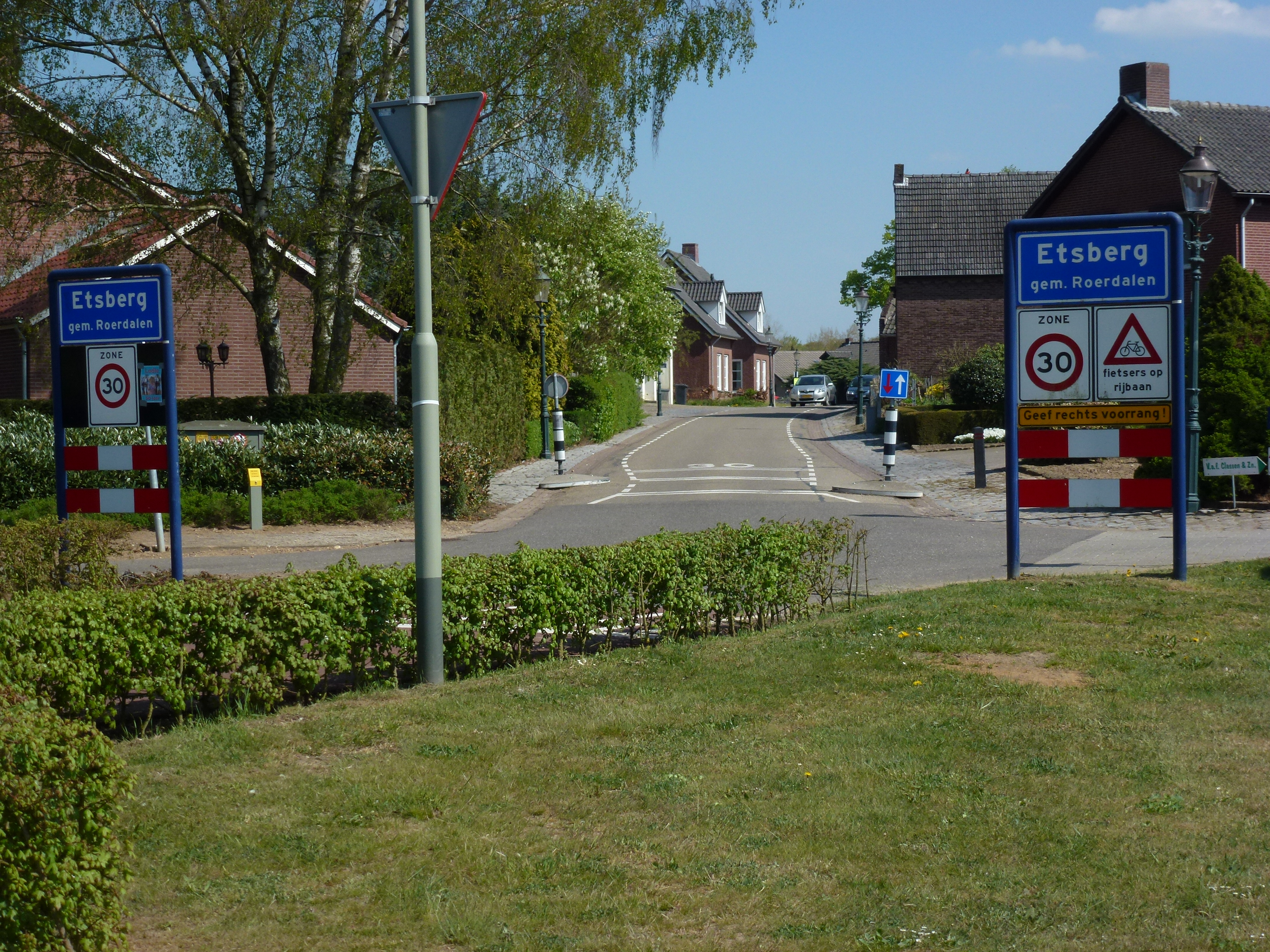

- Location in the Netherlands Location in the province of Limburg in the Netherlands
- Coordinates: 51°8′N 6°6′E
- Country: Netherlands
- Province: Limburg (Netherlands)
- Municipality: Roerdalen

Area
  - Total: 0.09 km^{2} (0.035 sq mi)
- Elevation: 30 m (98 ft)

Population (2021)
  - Total: 160
  - Density: 1,800/km^{2} (4,600/sq mi)
- Time zone: UTC+1 (CET)
  - Summer (DST): UTC+2 (CEST)
- Postal code: 6063
- Dialing code: 0475

Etsberg (Limburgish: Ètsberg) is a hamlet in the Dutch province of Limburg. It is a part of the municipality of Roerdalen, and lies about 9 km southeast of Roermond.

It was first mentioned between 1803 and 1820 as Etzenberg. The etymology is unclear. Unlike most hamlets, Etsberg has a dense triangular core. It was home to 234 people in 1840.
