= Boekend =

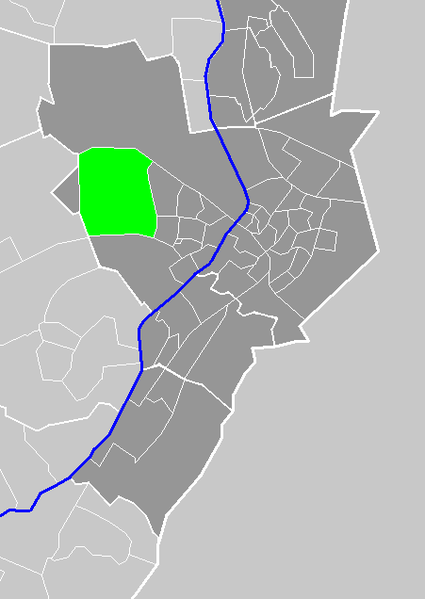
Location of Boekend in the municipality of Venlo

Boekend (Dutch pronunciation: [ˈbukɛnt]; Limburgish: D'n Bokent [dəm ˈboːkænt]; 51°23′N 6°7′E) is a village in the Dutch province of Limburg. It is a part of the municipality of Venlo, and located approximately 4 km west of the city center.

In 2001, Boekend had 328 inhabitants. The built-up area of the village was 0.1 km^{2}, and contained 122 residences.
