= Genhout =

- Village
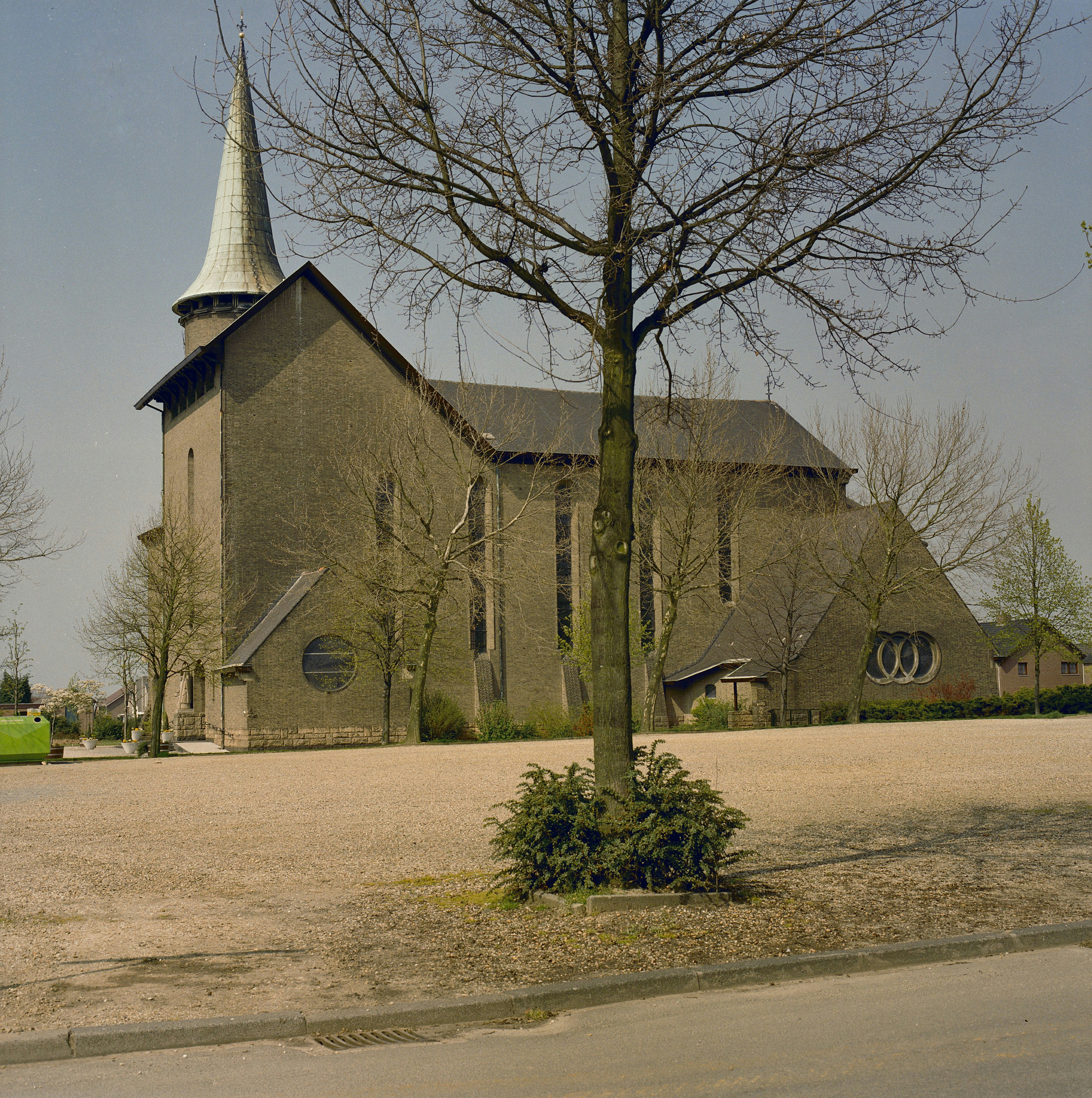
- St Hubertus Church

- Location in the Netherlands Location in the province of Limburg in the Netherlands
- Coordinates: 50.9283°N 5.8196°E
- Country: Netherlands
- Province: Limburg
- Municipality: Beek

Area
  - Total: 1.77 km^{2} (0.68 sq mi)
- Elevation: 84 m (276 ft)

Population (2021)
  - Total: 1,145
  - Density: 647/km^{2} (1,680/sq mi)
- Time zone: UTC+1 (CET)
  - Summer (DST): UTC+2 (CEST)
- Postal code: 6191
- Dialing code: 046

Genhout is a village in the Dutch province of Limburg. It is located in the municipality of Beek, and consists of two former settlements: the village Groot Genhout (Big Genhout) and the hamlet Klein Genhout (Little Genhout). Since 2005, the two settlements are no longer distinguished. It is located about 13 kilometres (8.1 mi) north-east of Maastricht.

== History ==
Both settlements were first mentioned in 1557 as Grootgenhout and Kleyngenhout. It means "elevated deciduous forest". Genhout developed on the plateau of Schimmert in the Middle Ages. Klein Genhout is located to the west of the Groot Genhout. The valleys of Limburg had already been cultivated before the Middle Ages. During the 12th and 13th century, cultivation started of the forests of the highlands.

The Catholic St Hubertus Church in Groot Genhout is a single aisled cruciform church with a round tower placed to the site. It was built between 1936 and 1937 and designed by Alphons Boosten. The church was restored in 1956. The tower is 42 metres (138 ft) tall and has a copper plated spire.

The grist mill Sint Hubertus in Klein Genhout was built in 1801 at the highest point. In 1941, a Diesel engine was installed, however the price of fuel during the war implied that the wind mill was still regularly in service. It remained in service until the late-1940s. In 1966, it was sold to the municipality for ƒ1.00. In 1971, the wind mill was back in working order.

Genhout was home to 312 people in 1840. In 1906, two Roman farms were discovered near Klein Genhout. The village Groot Genhout and the hamlet Klein Genhout used to have different place name signs. In 2005, both settlements have received Genhout signs.

== Gallery ==
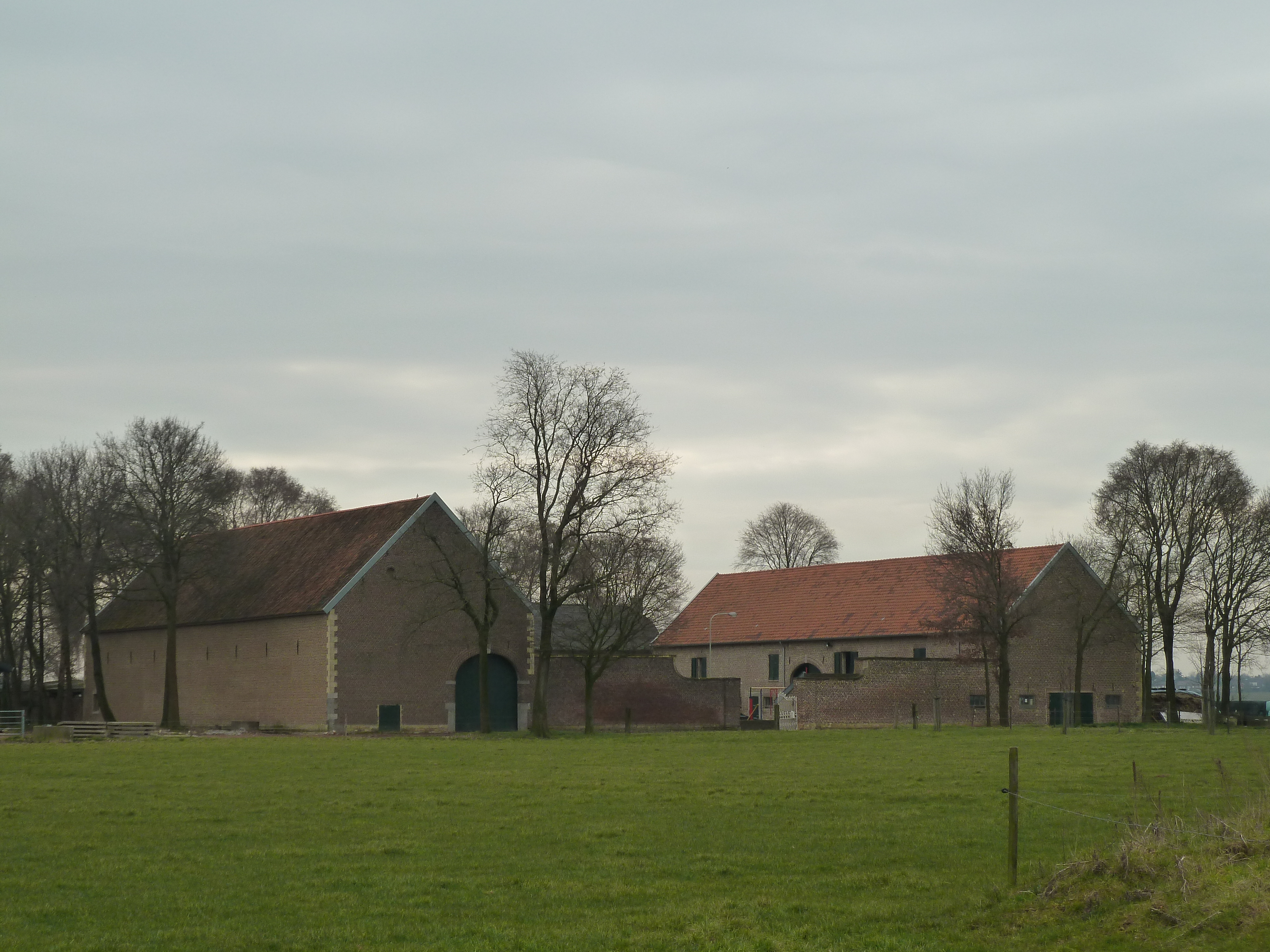
Farm in Genhout

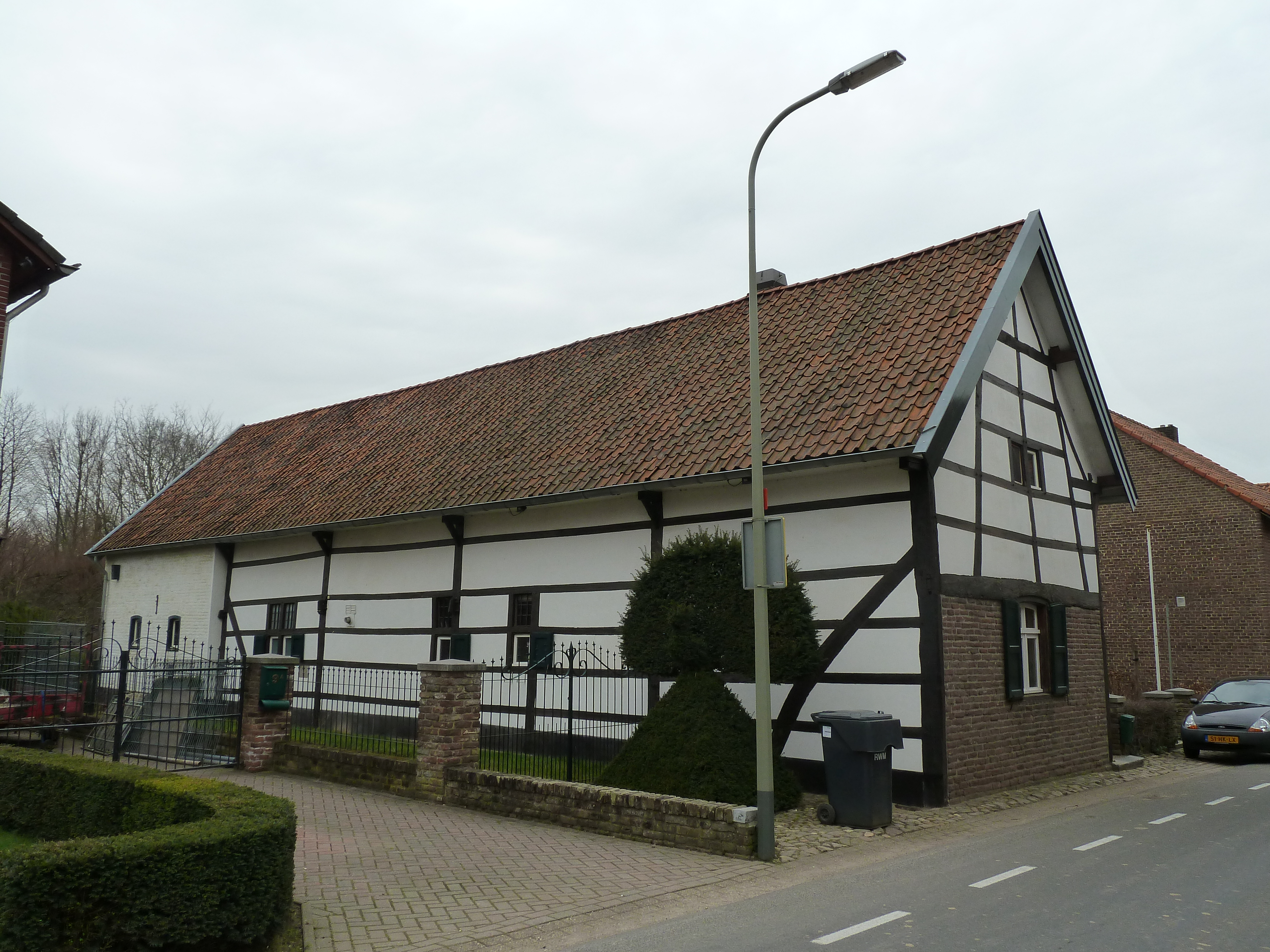
Farm in Genhout

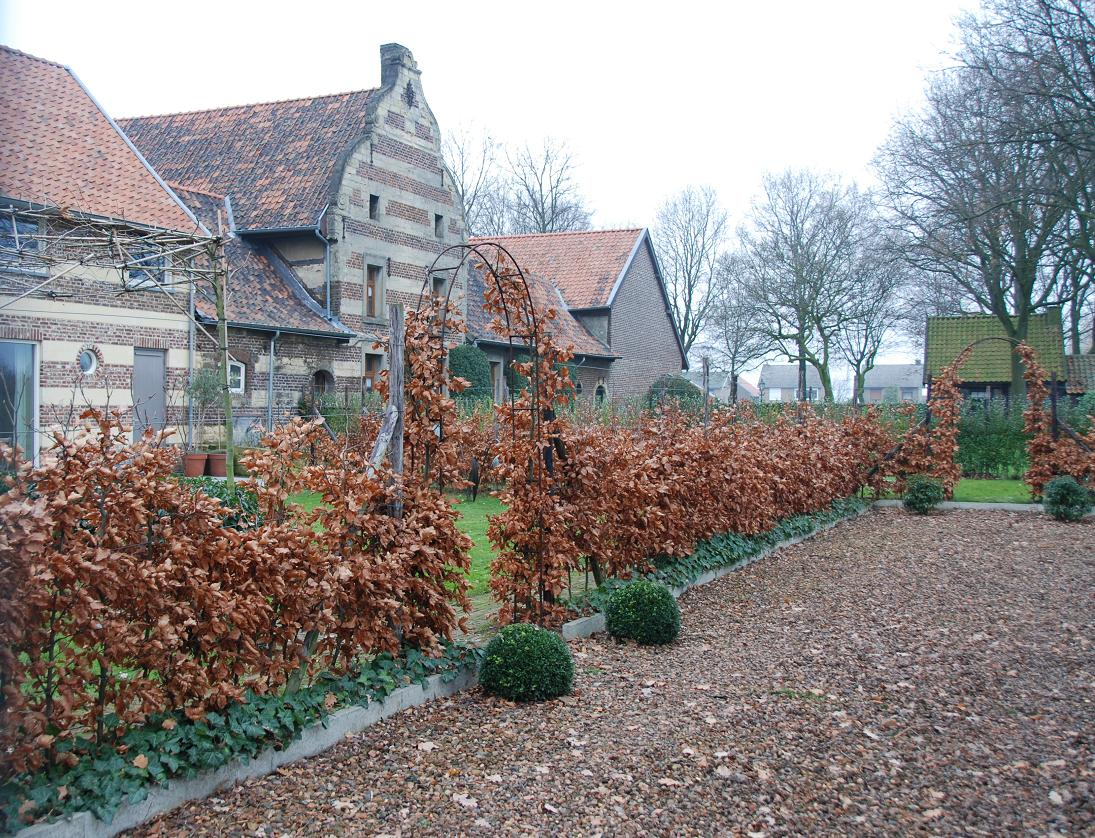
Farm in Genhout

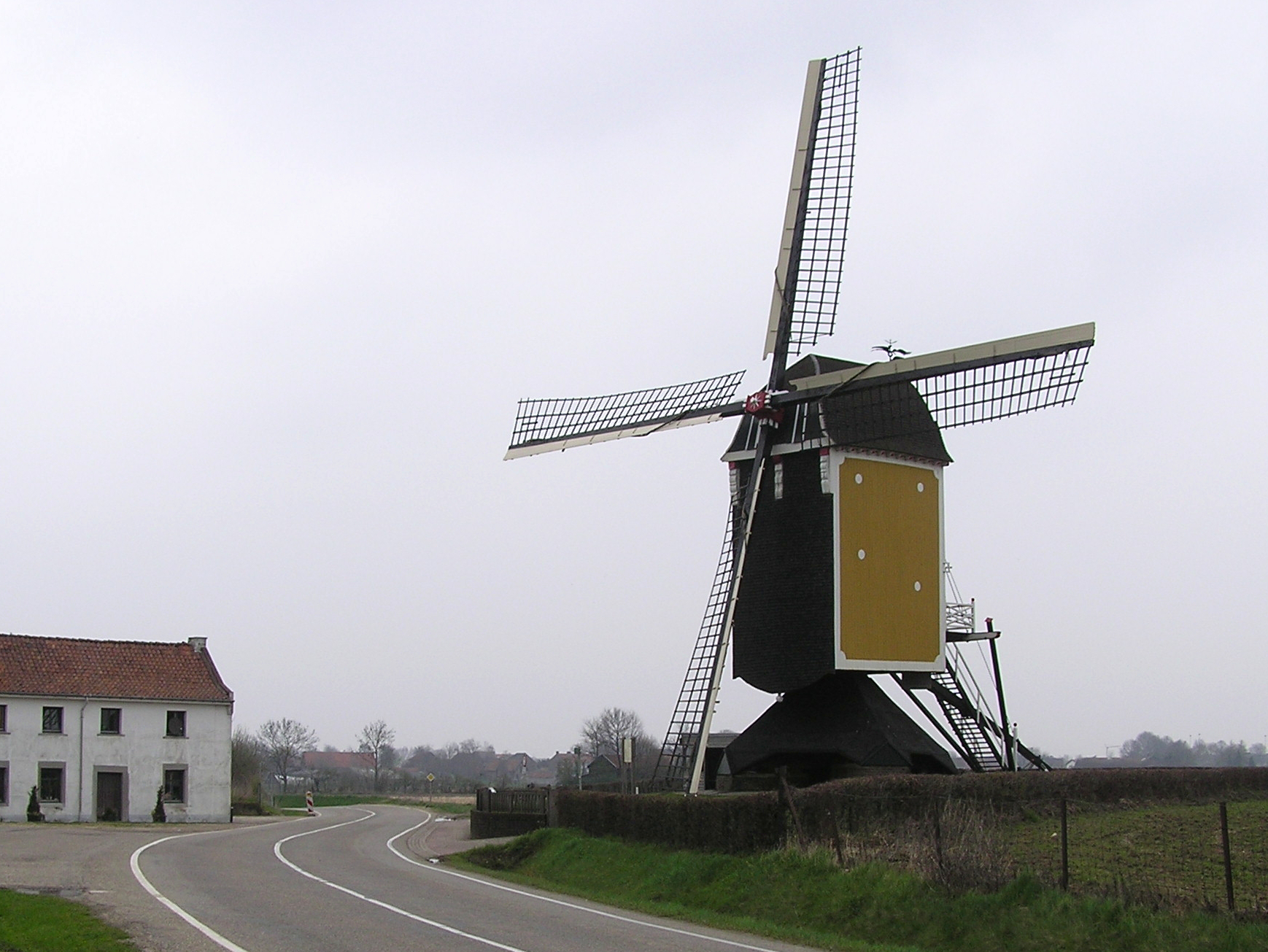
Windmill Hubertusmolen
