= Honthem =

Honthem Hoontem
- Hamlet
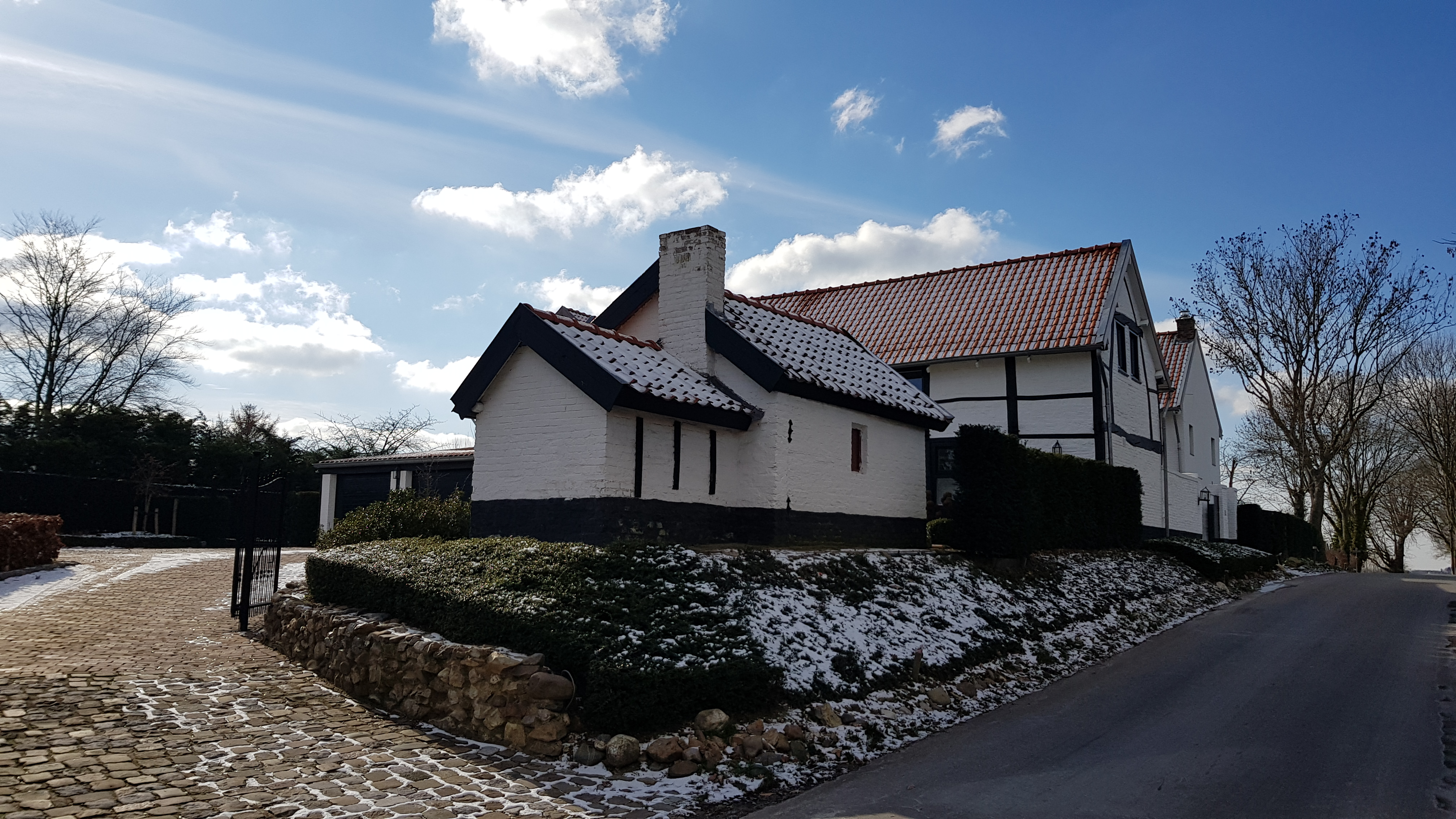
- Bakery in Honthem

- Location in the Netherlands Location in the province of Limburg in the Netherlands
- Coordinates: 50°48′50″N 5°48′16″E
- Country: Netherlands
- Province: Limburg
- Municipality: Eijsden-Margraten

Area
  - Total: 0.82 km^{2} (0.32 sq mi)
- Elevation: 170 m (560 ft)

Population (2021)
  - Total: 110
  - Density: 130/km^{2} (350/sq mi)
- Time zone: UTC+1 (CET)
  - Summer (DST): UTC+2 (CEST)
- Postal code: 6269
- Dialing code: 043

Honthem is a hamlet in the Limburg province of the Netherlands, about 7 km from Maastricht.

It was the first mentioned in 1375 as Huynthem, and means "settlement of Hundo (person)".

Honthem has placed name signs. It was home to 127 people in 1840.

== Gallery ==
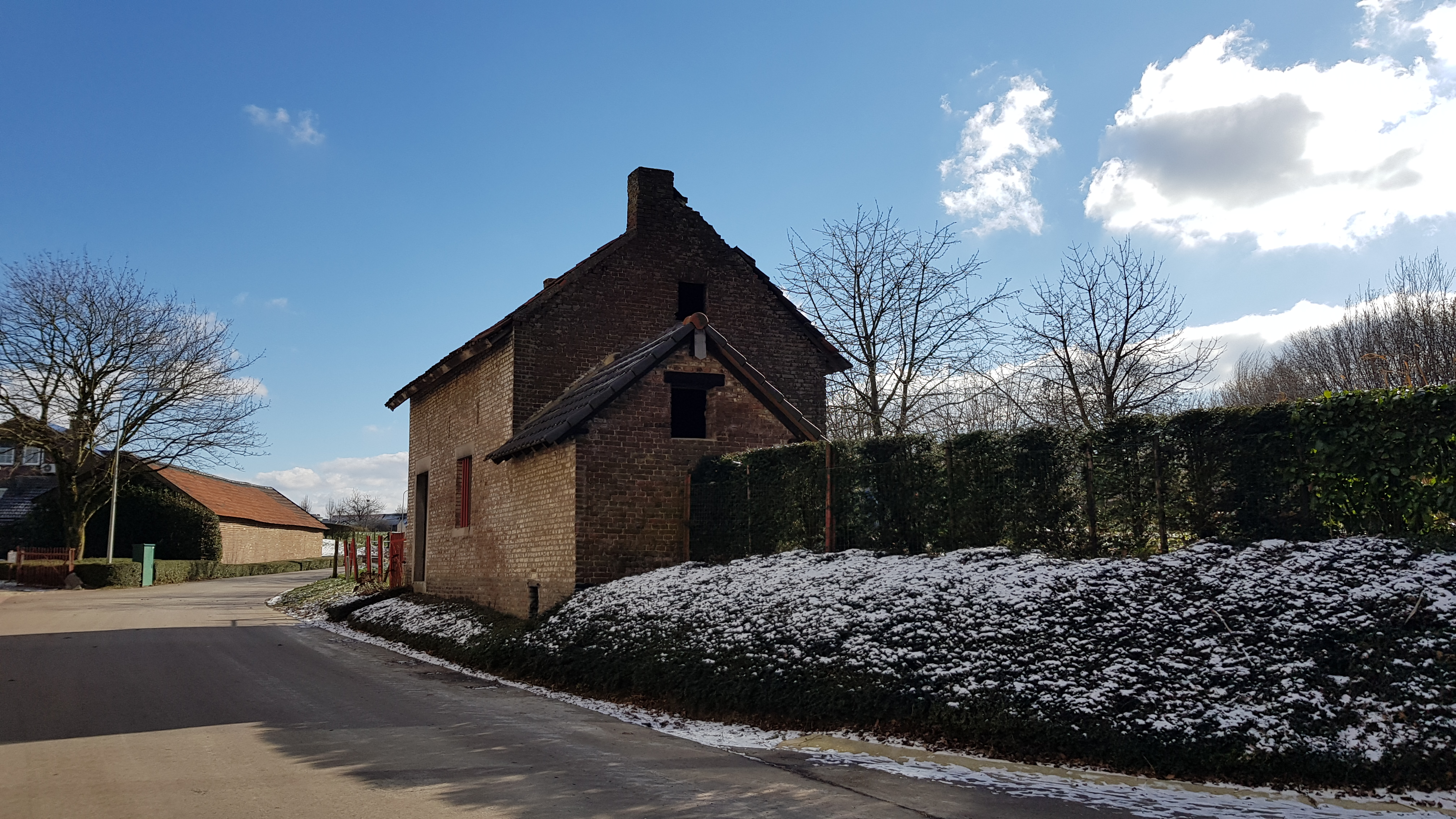
House in Honthem

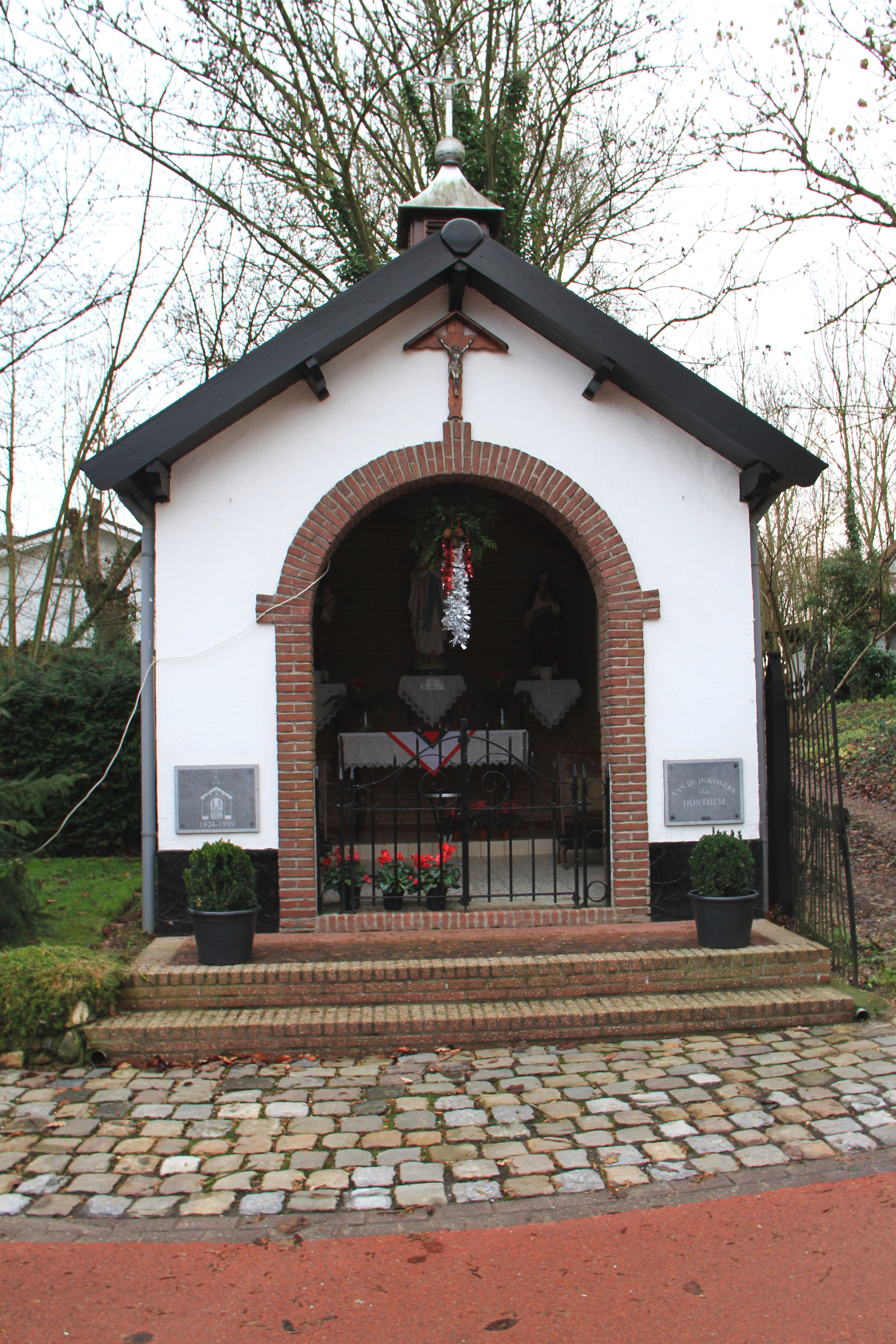
Mary Chapel

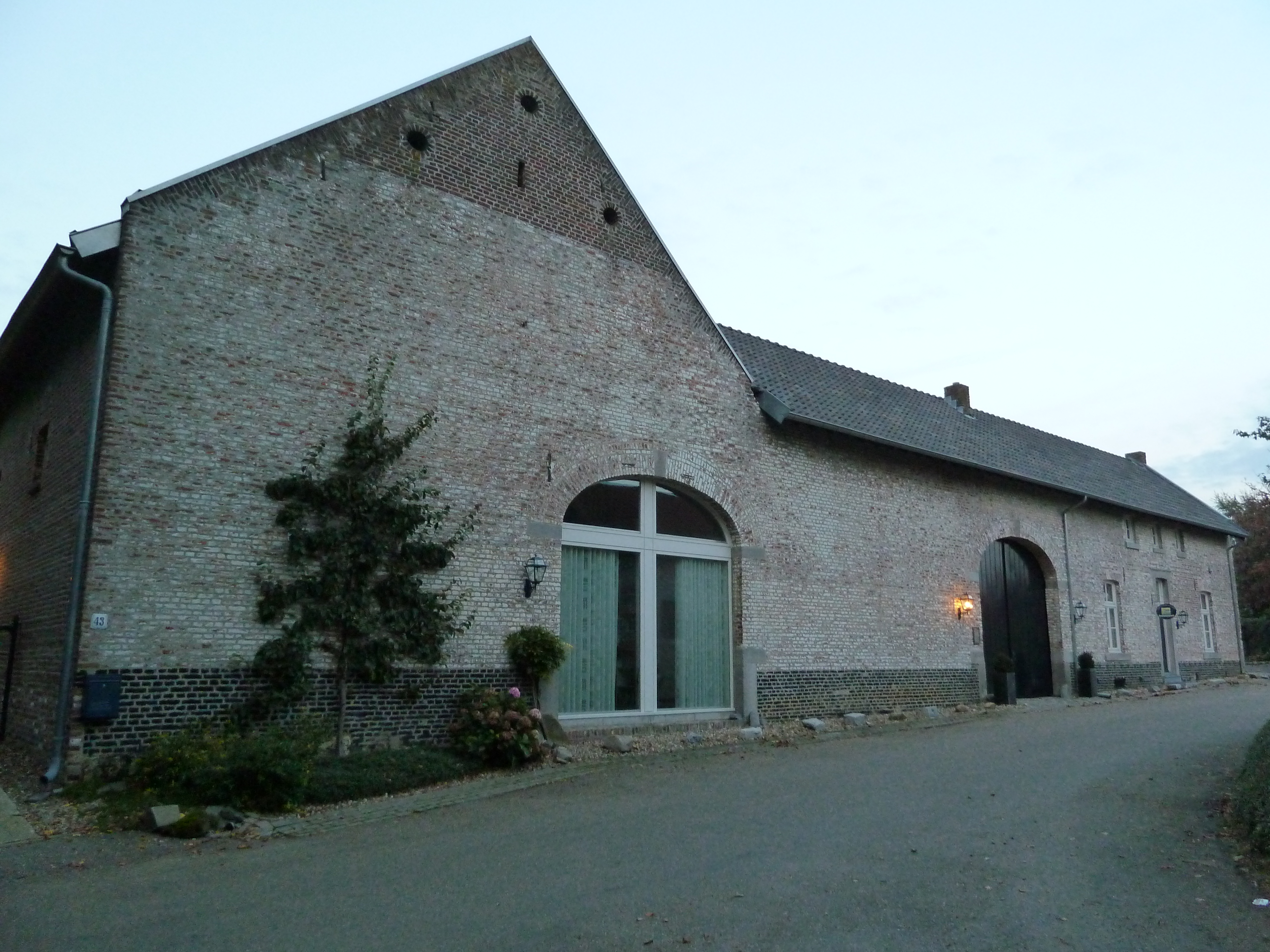
Farm in Honthem
