= KRUI =

KRUI may refer to:

- KRUI-FM, a radio station (89.7 FM) located in Iowa City, Iowa, United States
- KRUI (AM), a radio station (1490 AM) located in Ruidoso Downs, New Mexico, United States
