= Stålberg =

Stålberg or Stalberg is a surname. Notable people with the surname include:

- Carl Eric Stålberg (born 1951), Swedish businessman
- John Stalberg Jr. (born 1976), American film director, producer and screenwriter
- Sebastian Stålberg (born 1990), Swedish ice hockey player
- Viktor Stålberg (born 1986), Swedish ice hockey player
- Wilhelmina Stålberg (1803–1872), Swedish writer, poet, translator, and lyricist
