= Roskam, Netherlands =

Roskam
- Hamlet
- Location in the Netherlands Location in the province of Limburg in the Netherlands
- Coordinates: 51.1307°N 5.9990°E
- Country: Netherlands
- Province: Limburg (Netherlands)
- Municipality: Roerdalen
- Time zone: UTC+1 (CET)
  - Summer (DST): UTC+2 (CEST)
- Postal code: 6077
- Dialing code: 0475

Roskam is a hamlet in the Dutch municipality of Roerdalen. It is located between the larger towns of Posterholt and Sint Odiliënberg.

Roskam is not a statistical entity, and the postal authorities have placed it under Sint Odiliënberg. It consists of a handful of houses.
