= Bong, Velden =

Coordinates: 51°25′57″N 6°10′25″E

Bong (Dutch: [bɔŋ], Limburgish: [bɔŋ]) is a hamlet in the Dutch province of Limburg. It is located in the municipality of Venlo, about 2 km north of Velden, Limburg.
