= Kruis =

Kruis (Dutch pronunciation: [krœys]; "Cross") is a surname of primarily Dutch and Flemish origin. Notable people with the surname include:

- Andrea Kruis (born 1962), Dutch comics artist
- Deon Kruis (born 1974), South African cricketer
- George Kruis (born 1990), British rugby union player
- Jan Kruis (1933–2017), Dutch comics artist
- Konrad Kruis (1930–2022), German lawyer and judge
- Sebastian Kruis (born 1989), Dutch politician

== See also ==
- Gert Kruys (born 1961), Dutch football player and manager
  - Rick Kruys (born 1985), Dutch football player and manager, son of Gert
- Kruys, Dutch patrician family
- Zilveren Kruis, Dutch health insurance company
