= Maasbree =

Maasbree Bree
- Town and former municipality
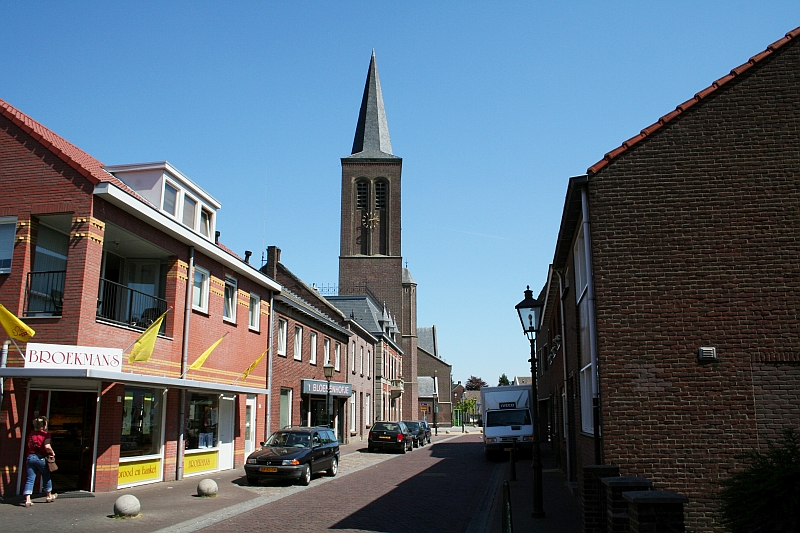
- Horn Castle

- Flag Coat of arms

- Location in the Netherlands Location in the province of Limburg in the Netherlands
- Coordinates: 51°21′N 6°03′E
- Country: Netherlands
- Province: Limburg
- Municipality: Peel en Maas

Area
  - Total: 32.36 km^{2} (12.49 sq mi)
- Elevation: 27 m (89 ft)

Population (2021)
  - Total: 6,625
  - Density: 204.7/km^{2} (530.2/sq mi)
- Time zone: UTC+1 (CET)
  - Summer (DST): UTC+2 (CEST)
- Postal code: 5993
- Dialing code: 077

Maasbree (Dutch: [maːzˈbreː]; Limburgish: Bree) is a former municipality and a town in southeastern Netherlands. Until 1818, the municipality was just called Bree in Dutch too.

== Population centres ==
- Baarlo
- Maasbree

== History ==
In the Middle Ages Maasbree and Baarlo belonged to the duchy of Guelders. Around 1702, at the time of the War of the Spanish Succession, Maasbree was occupied by Prussia and remained Prussian until 1814. In 1815 Maasbree became part of the United Kingdom of the Netherlands.

Maasbree used to be a fiefdom with a castle called Huis Bree, which has now disappeared.

The punk rock group Sex Pistols performed at Maf Centrum on 11 December 1977, as part of their Dutch Tour. This would be the last date of the tour, as the final 2 dates in Winschoten and Rotterdam were cancelled.
