= Wieler =

Wieler is a surname. Notable people with the surname include:

- Diana Wieler (born 1961), Canadian writer
- Lothar H. Wieler, (born 1961), German veterinarian and microbiologist
- Michael Wieler (born 1981), German rower
- Vic Wieler, Canadian politician
