= Peel en Maas =

Peel en Maas Pieël en Maas
- Municipality
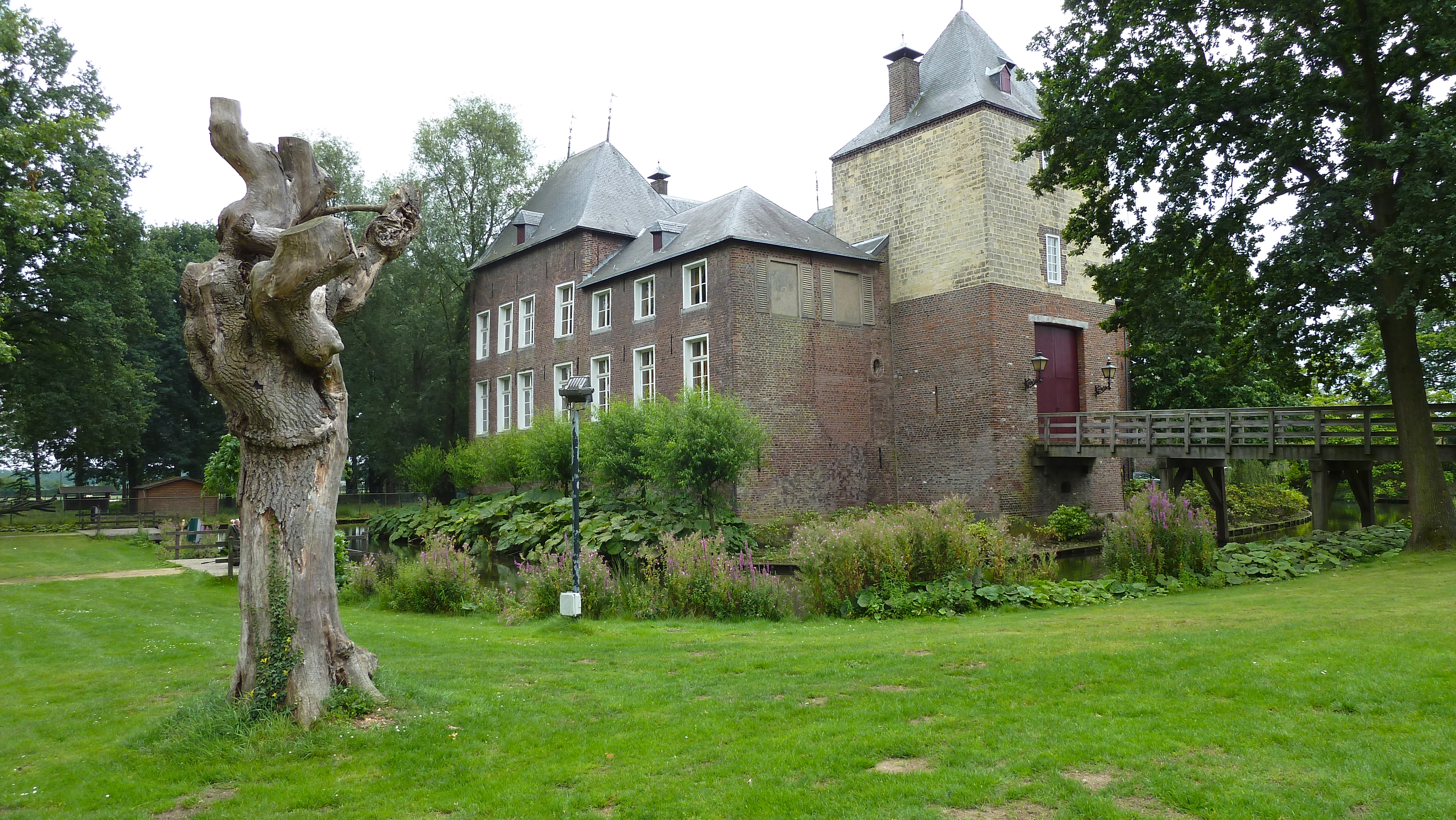
- D'Erp Castle in Baarlo

- Flag Coat of arms

- Location in Limburg
- Coordinates: 51°20′N 5°59′E
- Country: Netherlands
- Province: Limburg
- Established: 1 January 2010

Government
  - Body: Municipal council
  - Mayor: Bob Vostermans (CDA)

Area
  - Total: 161.35 km^{2} (62.30 sq mi)
  - Land: 159.37 km^{2} (61.53 sq mi)
  - Water: 1.98 km^{2} (0.76 sq mi)
- Elevation: 34 m (112 ft)

Population (January 2021)
  - Total: 43,660
  - Density: 274/km^{2} (710/sq mi)
- Time zone: UTC+1 (CET)
  - Summer (DST): UTC+2 (CEST)
- Postcode: 5768, 5980–5995
- Area code: 077
- Website: www.peelenmaas.nl

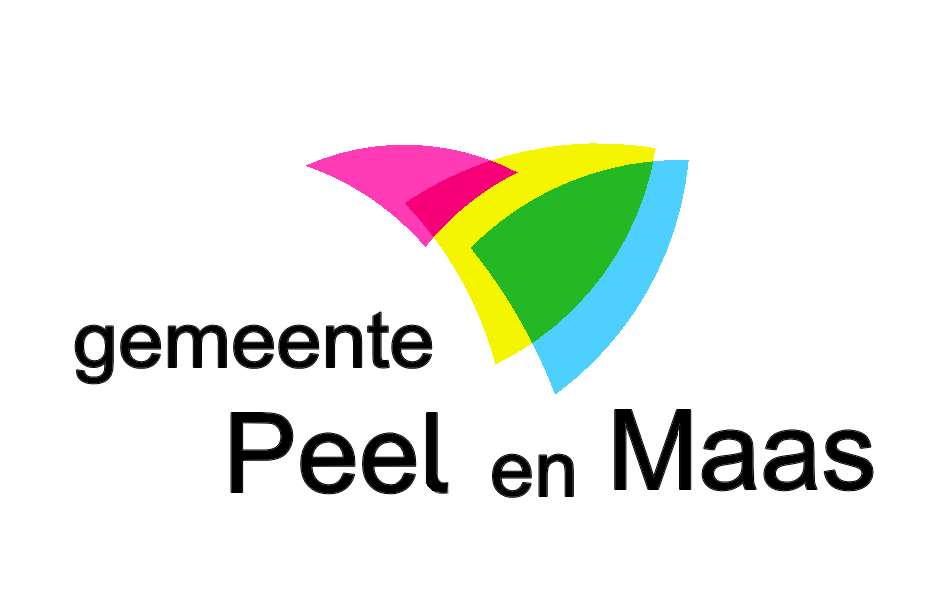
Logo Peel en Maas municipality

Peel en Maas (Dutch pronunciation: [ˈpeːl ɛ ˈmaːs]; Limburgish: Pieël en Maas) is a municipality in the southeastern Netherlands, established on 1 January 2010. It is situated in the province of Limburg. The municipality is formed by the towns of Panningen, Helden, Kessel, Kessel-Eik, Maasbree, Baarlo, Beringe, Egchel, Grashoek, Koningslust, and Meijel. It has a population of more than 40,000 people from various backgrounds. The municipality has several facilities such as a high school, public library, swimming pool, and a well-connected public bus transport system.

Each town has its own characteristics. The municipality's official slogan is: "beleef de ruimte!" (experience the space!).

== History ==
The towns are situated in the Dutch province of Limburg. This province was part of the southern Catholic parts of the Low Lands. Through history, the towns have been under Belgian, German, and eventually Dutch rule. Each town has a strong local identity and there is a healthy rivalry during the annual carnival festivities.

== Sightseeing ==
The municipality has several noteworthy places to visit.

- To the right is the Maas river with a boulevard in the city of Kessel
- To the south is the Musschenberg and the Weerdbeemden natural reserve. Along this path is a former Roman street where Roman coins have been found.
- Castle the Keverberg (Kessel)
- Sint Antonius Windmill (Kessel)
- Castle the Berckt (Baarlo)

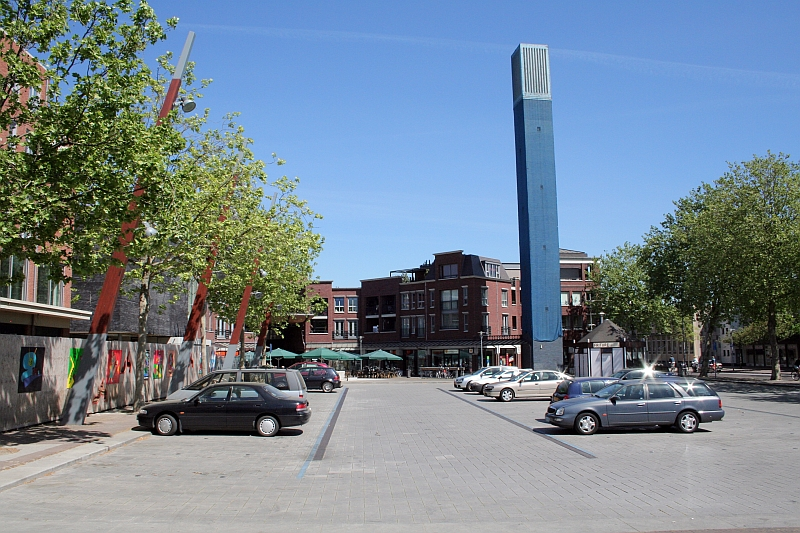
Square in Panningen

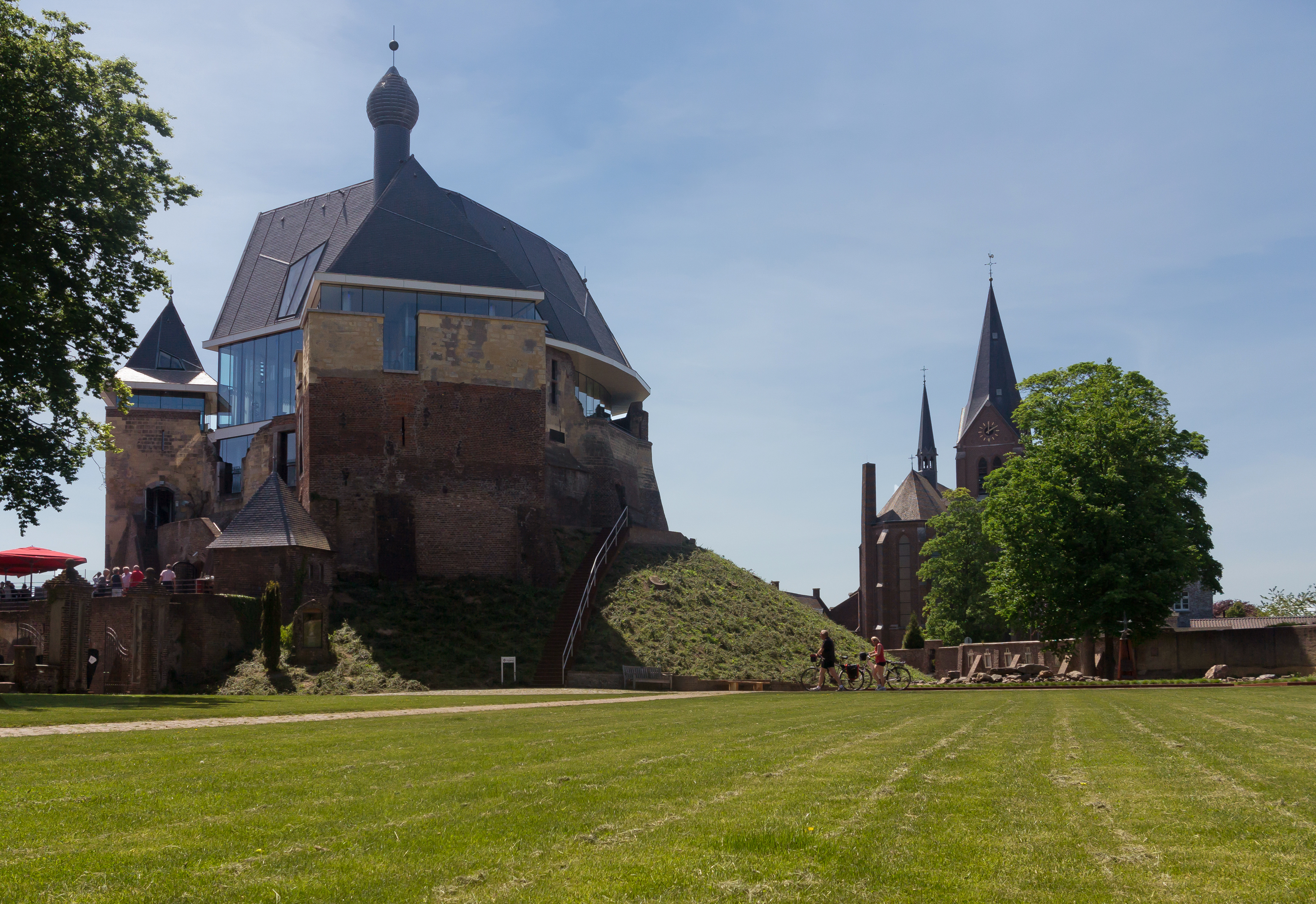
The Keverberg Castle in Kessel

== Topography ==
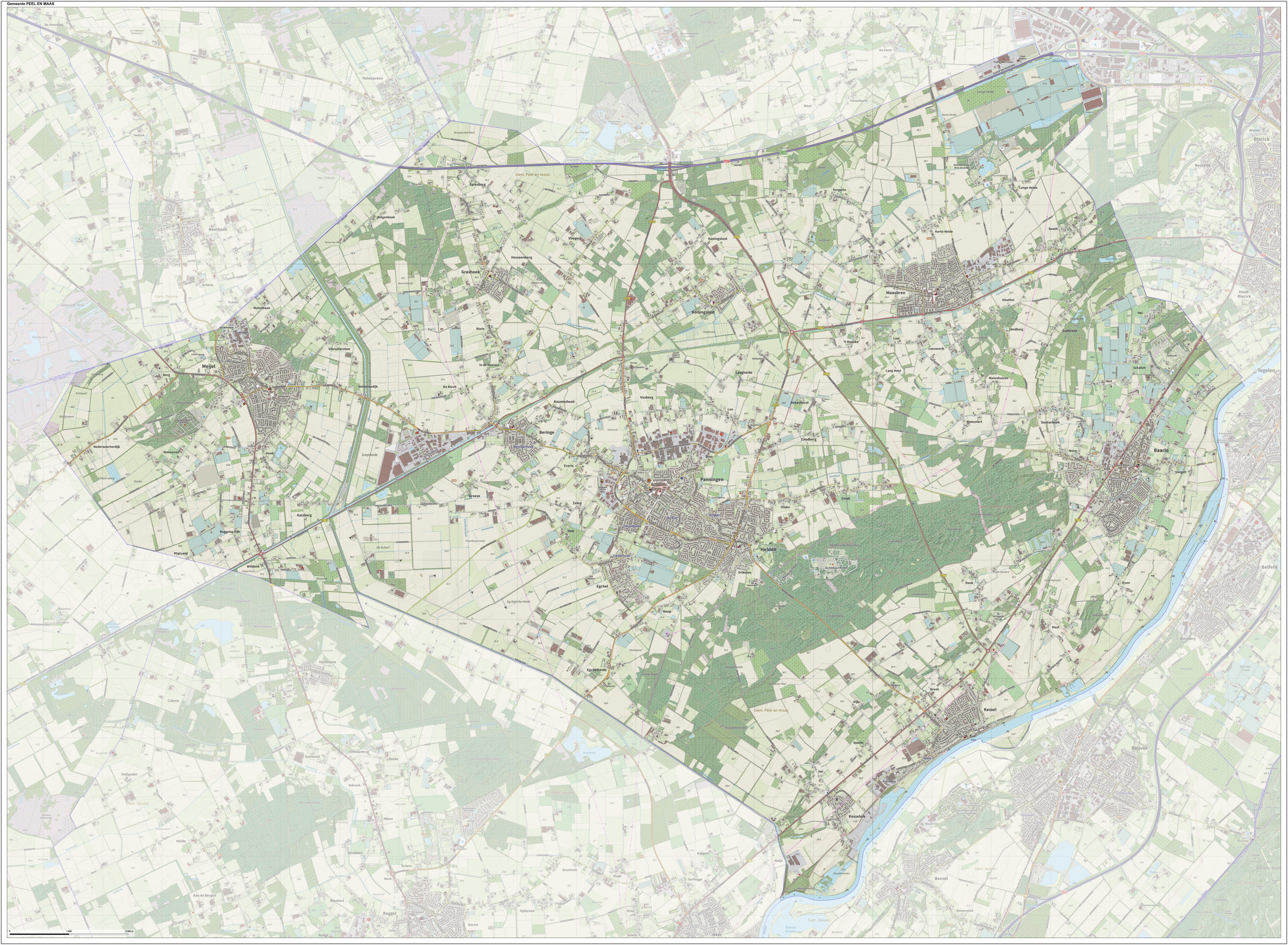

Dutch Topographic map of the municipality of Peel en Maas, June 2015

== Notable people ==
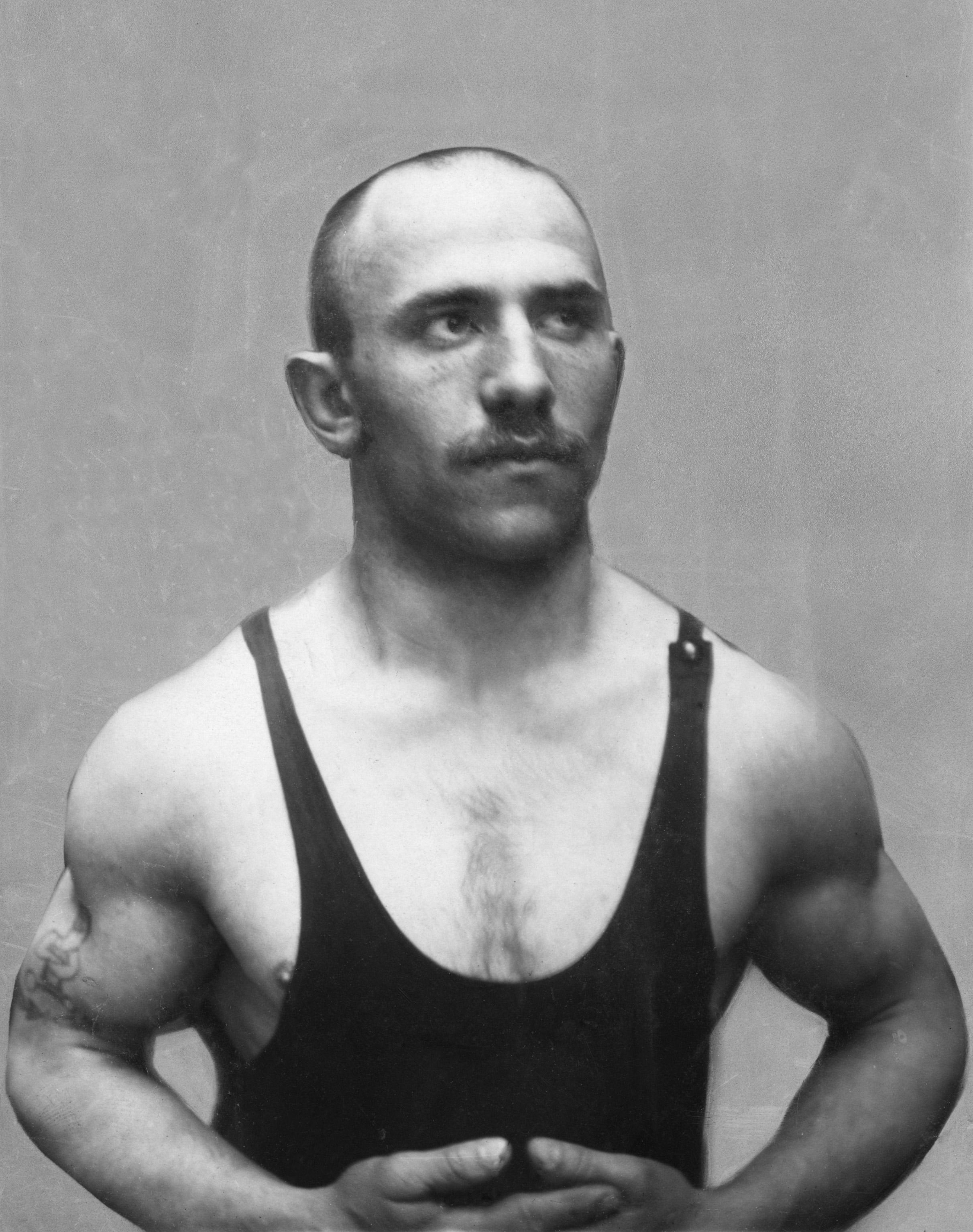
Johannes Eillebrecht, 1912

- Johannes Eillebrecht (1888 in Helden – 1954) a Greco-Roman wrestler, competed at the 1912 and the 1920 Summer Olympics
- Jan Hendrix (born 1949 in Maasbree) a Dutch-born artist, lives and works in Mexico
- Leon Thijssen (born 1968 in Baarlo) a Dutch show jumper
- Mustafa Amhaouch (born 1970 in Panningen) a Dutch politician
- Mark Verheijen (born 1976 in Baarlo) a Dutch former politician
- Brennan Heart (Fabian Bohn (given name) born 1982 in Helden) a Dutch DJ and hardstyle producer
- Martin Porter (born 1983 in Maasbree) a Dutch artist and songwriter
- Bert Selen (born 1985 in Kessel-Eik) music producer, TV/film composer, instrumentalist and songwriter
- Jorrit Hendrix (born 1995 in Panningen) a Dutch footballer
