= Montfortian dialect =

Limburgish dialect

Montfortian
- Mofers
- (Mofertaans)
- Pronunciation: [ˈmoː˦fərs], [ˌmoː˦fərˈtaːns]
- Native to: The Netherlands
- Region: Montfort, Maria-Hoop, Echterbosch, Aan de Berg, Reutje, Putbroek
- Native speakers: (undated figure of 3,000)
- Language family: Indo-European: Germanic; West Germanic; Istvaeonic; Meuse-Rhenish; Limburgish; Central Limburgish; Horns; Montfortian
- Writing system: Latin alphabet (variant)

Official status
- Official language in: no official status
- Regulated by: Stichting Mofers Waordebook

Language codes
- ISO 639-3: –
- Glottolog: None

Montfortian (locally Mofers or Mofertaans) is a Central Limburgish dialect spoken in the Dutch town of Montfort. It is closely related to the dialects spoken in Echt, Sint Joost, Hingen, Peij, Slek (Echt-Susteren, Limburg) and Koningsbosch.

There are three main variants with only minor differences:

- Mofertaans (spoken in Aan de Berg and Montfort)
- Pötbrooks (spoken in Echterbosch, Maria-Hoop and Putbroek)
- Räötjes (spoken in Reutje, often grouped with the dialect of Sint Odiliënberg)

== Phonology ==
=== Consonants ===
	Labial	Alveolar	Palatal	Velar	Glottal
Nasal	m	n	ɲ	ŋ	
Stop	p b	t d	c ɟ	k ɡ	(ʔ)
Affricate			tʃ dʒ		
Fricative	f v	s z	ʃ ʒ	x ɣ	h
Rhotic		r			
Approximant	w	(ð)	j		
Lateral approximant		l	ʎ		

Labiovelar /w/ may also be realised as bilabial [β̞].

In a front vowel environment, /x/ and /ɣ/ are fronted to [ç] and [ʝ].

[ɦ] is an allophone of /h/.

The exact realization of /r/ depends on the speaker. Older speakers tend to use a trilled [r] in free variation with [ɾ], while younger speakers tend to use a uvular [ʁ].

Before rounded vowels, all of the consonants exhibit some degree of labialization.

=== Vowels ===
==== Monophthongs ====
	Front	Central	Back
Close	i iː y yː		u uː
Close-mid	e eː ø øː	ə	o oː
Open-mid	ɛ ɛː œ œː	ə	ɔ ɔː
Near-open	æ æː		
Open	aː		ɑ ɑː

- /ə/ only occurs in unstressed syllables.
- /ɑː/ only occurs in loanwords from English.

Montfortian Vowels with Example Words
Symbol	Example		
IPA	IPA	orthography	English translation
iː	ˈiː˦zəʁ	iezer	'iron'
i	ˈniks	nieks	'nothing'
yː	ˈyːl	uul	'owl'
y	ˈbyt	buut	'goal'
ø	ˈøməʁ	ummer	'always'
uː	ˈuːʁ	oer	'hour'
u	ˈtut	toet	'until'
e	ˈen˦	in	'in'
eː	ˈneː˦stə	neeste/neêste	'to sneeze'
øː	ˈmøːç˦	meug/meûg	'tired'
o	ˈmot˦ə	mótte	'to have to/must/should have to'
oː	ˈdoːn	doon	'to do'
ə	ˈdom˦ə	dómme	'to become stupid'
ɔ	ˈɔk˦	ok	'okay'
ɛ	ˈhɛɡ˦	hègk	'fence'
ɛː	ˈklɛːn	klèèn	'little'
œ	ˈdœk˦	dök	'often'
œː	ˈœːʁkə	äörke	'little vein'
ɔː	ˈɔːʁ	aor	'vein'
æ	ˈæn(ð)˦	en	'and'
æː	ˈmæːʁ˦	maer	'lake'
aː	ˈvaːn˦	vaan/vaân	'flag' (compare Dutch vaandel)
ɑ	ˈɑl˦	al	'all/everything'
ɑː	ˈɑːbəʁ	abber/âbber	'but' (obsolete, compare German aber)

== Grammar ==
Like most Limburgish dialects, the grammar of Montfortian is very irregular and less simplified than the Dutch is.

=== Articles ===
There are two groups of articles: definite articles and indefinite articles. When referring to one particular person or item, the definite article is used (English the) In plural, like in English, there is no indefinite article and the indefinite forms consist of nouns unaccompanied by any article. Articles are conjugated by gender, bdht-vowel-rule, grammatical case and quantity. The form of the article could also be determined by whether a preposition is used.

The bdht-vowel-rule is a grammatical rule of Limburgish that influences the conjugation of the articles and adjectives. Words starting with b, d, h, t or a vowel put an extra 'n' to the article or adjective where possible. The high tree → d'n n boum but the fat man → de vètte miens. This extra 'n' is called naoklank (stress) in Limburgish.

The numeral ein (one) and negative indefinite article gein (no, not a, not any) are conjugated the same as 'n (a) So the nominative will be conjugated as einen, eine, ein, ein, ein, ei and geinen, geine, gein, gein, gein, gei. gein could also be gèn: gènnen, gènne, gèn, gèn, gèn, gèn, but then the neutral unstressed nominative will have a final 'n'.

Definite articles
Gender →		Masculine		Feminine		Neutral		Plural	
Case ↓	Prep? ↓	stressed	unstressed	stressed	unstressed	stressed	unstressed	stressed	unstressed
Nominative	Yes	–	–	–	–	–	–	–	–
Nominative	No	d'n	de	de, d'n	de	't	't	de	de
Genitive	Yes	gès	gès	gèr	gèr	gès	gès	gèr	gèr
Genitive	No	dès, diz-	dès	dèr, dir-	dèr	dès, diz-	dès	dèr, dir-	dèr
Locative	Yes	gèès	gèès	gèès	gèès	gèès	gèès	gèès	gèès
Locative	No	dèès	dèès	dèès	dèès	dèès	dèès	dèès	dèès
Dative	Yes	gèm	g'm	g'r	g'r	gèm	g'm	ge	ge
Dative	No	dèm	d'm	d'r	d'r	dèm	d'm	de	de
Accusative	Yes	g'n	ge	ge, g'n	ge	g'n	ge	ge	ge
Accusative	No	d'n	de	de, d'n	de	d'n	de	de	de

Indefinite articles
Gender →		Masculine		Feminine		Neutral		Plural	
Case ↓	Prep? ↓	stressed	unstressed	stressed	unstressed	stressed	unstressed	stressed	unstressed
Nominative	Yes	–	–	–	–	–	–	–	–
Nominative	No	'nen	'ne	'n	'n	'n	e	?	?
Genitive	Yes	'nes	'nes	'ner	'ner	'nes	'nes	?	?
Genitive	No	'nes	'nes	'ner	'ner	'nes	'nes	?	?
Locative	Yes	nèès	nèès	nèès	nèès	nèès	nèès	?	?
Locative	No	nèès	nèès	nèès	nèès	nèès	nèès	?	?
Dative	Yes	'nem	'nem	'ner	'ner	'nem	'nem	?	?
Dative	No	'nem	'nem	'ner	'ner	'nem	'nem	?	?
Accusative	Yes	'nen	'n	'n	'n	'n	e	?	?
Accusative	No	'nen	'n	'n	'n	'n	e	?	?

=== Umlaut ===
Verbs, nouns and adjectives use an umlaut. Standard umlauts are:

root	umlaut	example		translation
a	e	bal	bel	ball
aa	ae	aaks	aeks	ax
ao	äö	aor	äör	vein
au/ou	öj/ui	oug	öjg	eye
ei	èè	ei	èèjer	egg
ó	ö	pót	pöt	pot
oo	eu	radio	raedieu	radio
oe	uu	oer	uur	hour
oea	uue	doeas	duues	box

=== Nouns ===
Nouns are declined by quantity, size and grammatical case. There are several conjugations for those. Though most grammatical cases got out of use, nominative, locative and genitive still exist. Dative is still attested in De Vastelaoves Gezèt (ca. 1900) but it already contained the accusative of which only a few fragments are found (ca. 1830) Montfortian nouns have a so-called diminutive, uurke (from oer) means little hour. Nouns only possess a plural and not a dual (like the verb imperative and some personal pronouns) Plurals (and also diminutives) always use an umlaut where possible (see also Umlaut above) Also ablauts can occur, like blood → bloojer (blood → "bloods") blood is one of the few exceptions of nouns which don't use an umlaut. If blood was regular, the plural would be *bleujer. Nouns are masculine, feminine or neutral.

There are over 20 different regular conjugations, but these are the six most used. Please note that only the nominative, genitive and locative are still in use today. Accusative and dative have been replaced by the nominative. Instead of the genitive also the preposition van could be used and the locative could be replaced by nao. The fifth conjugation uses tonality, singular is drag tone, plural is push tone. Also note the ablaut of the first conjugation at the dative singular and locative.

Nouns in the Montfortian dialect
	First		Second		Third		Fourth		Fifth		Sixth	
	Singular	Plural	Singular	Plural	Singular	Plural	Singular	Plural	Singular	Plural	Singular	Plural
Nominative	heim	heimer	blood	bloojer	tandj	tenj	las	lester	daag	daag	bal	bel
Genitive	heims	heimer	bloods	bloojer	tanjes	tenj	lasses	lester	daags	daag(s)	bals	bel
Locative	heives	heiveser	blodes	blodeser	tandjes	tenjes	lastes	lesteser	dages	dages	balles	belleser
Dative	heivem	heimer	blodem	bloojer	tandj	tenj	?	?	dagem	dagem	ballem	?
Accusative	heim	heimern	blood	?	tandj	?	?	?	dagen	?	?	?
English	home		blood		tooth		burden		day		ball	

The first conjugation group also contains "irregular" words like hoes → hoeze (house) and doef → doeve (dove)

==== Loanwords ====
Historically, Montfortian and most other Limburgish dialects have borrowed hundreds of words from French (during the First French Empire). These words nowadays have totally been adapted to the difficult noun (and verb) systems of Montfortian. Petiek (from French butique) means mess. It has totally been adapted to the system and now belongs to the first conjugation. It even has an ablaut at the locative, petiek (mess) → petieches (movement towards the mess)

Some modern-day loanwords, especially those from English, may confuse people. Some people pronounce computer (singular) with drag tone and put it in the fifth group, whereas others use a push tone. Computer with push tone can therefore mean both one computer and more computers, depending on the speaker. Overall speaking, English loanwords have a push tone and are put in the first or sixth conjugation group, depending on whether an umlaut is possible. Computer with a push tone in the singular will have the following diminutive: kómpjoêter → kómpjuueterke. Some speakers might even pronounce it as kepjoeater.

==== Diminutive ====
In general, diminutives are formed by adding -(s)ke to the root and using an umlaut where possible. tak → tekske, kaktös → kektöske, radio → raedieuke, radiator → raediaetörke, piano → piaeneuke. Words ending on j, t or d have -(j)e as suffix. blood → bleudje, plant → plentje, kantj → kentje. Plurals always take -s, tak → tekske → tekskes.

Sometimes only the diminutive has survived, while the root got out of use. The original form can then be reconstructed. For example, the word bruuedje (little bread) does not have a root anymore. The word used for bread is wèk (which also has its own diminutive wèkske) If bruuedje is reversed to its root then it becomes *broead(j). Modern Montfortian still has the word broead but its meaning has shifted from normal bread to bread specifically from rye made in Limburg (or Brabant)

=== Numerals ===
Montfortian uses a decimal numeral system, without octal traces like many other European languages. There are only a few vigesimal traces left.

Numerals
Modern			Archaic		Modern			Archaic		Modern			Archaic	
cardinal	ordinal		cardinal	ordinal	cardinal	ordinal		cardinal	ordinal	cardinal	ordinal		cardinal	ordinal
nól	nólste	0	geine	geinste	tieën	tieëndje	10	teen	teendje	doezjendj	doezjendjste	1000	doezjend	doezjendste
ein	ieëste	1	ein	ieëste	èlf	èlfdje	11	èlf	èlfdje	hóngerdj	hóngerdjste	100	hóngrèt	hóngrètste
twieë	twieëdje	2	twei	tweidsdje	twèlf	twèlfdje	12	twèlf	twèlfdje	twintjig	twintjigste	20	twintj	twinsjdje
drie	dèrdje	3	dree	dördje	dèrtieën	dèrtieëndje	13	dörteen	dörteendje	dèrtig	dèrtigste	30	halftweitwintj	halftweitwinsjdje
veer	veerdje	4	veer	veerdje	veertieën	veertieëndje	14	veerteen	veerteendje	veertig	veertigste	40	tweitwintj	tweitwinsjdje
vief	viefdje	5	vief	viefdje	vieftieën	vieftieëndje	15	viefteen	viefteendje	vieftig	vieftigste	50	halfdreetwintj	halfdreetwinsjdje
zès	zèsdje	6	zès	zèsdje	zèstieën	zèstieëndje	16	zèsteen	zèsteendje	zèstig	zèstigste	60	dreetwintj	dreetwinsjdje
zeve	zevendje	7	zönnef	zönnefdje	zevetieën	zevetieëndje	17	zönnef-èn-teen	zönnef-èn-teendje	zevetig	zevetigste	70	halfveertwintj	halfveertwinsjdje
ach	achste	8	ach	achste	achtieën	achtieëndje	18	ach-èn-halftwintj	ach-èn-halftwinsjdje	achtig	achtigste	80	veertwintj	veertwinsjdje
nege	negendje	9	neuge	neugendje	negetieën	negetieëndje	19	neuge-n-èn-halftwintj	neuge-n-èn-halftwinsjdje	neugetig	neugetigste	90	halfvieftwintj	halfvieftwinsjdje

The cardinal numerals from 21 to 99 (apart from the tens) are constructed in a regular way, by adding -èn- (and) and the name of the appropriate multiple of ten to the name of the units position. (As in German, the last written digit is actually pronounced first):

- 28 ach-èn-twintjig (literally "eight and twenty")
- 83 drie-èn-achtig
- 99 nege-n-èn-neugetig (-n is added for the sound)

100 is hóngerdj, 200 twieëhóngerdj, 300 driehóngerdj and so on.

Numerals between 101 and 999 are constructed as follows:

- 112 hóngerdj-èn-twèlf
- 698 zèshóngerdj-èn-ach-èn-neugetig ("six hundred and eight and ninety")

The same system used for naming the hundreds applies to the higher base numbers that are powers of ten. Limburgish dialects always use the long scale system, like Dutch.

- 1 000 doezjendj
- 1 000 000 miljoen
- 1 000 000 000 miljardj
- 1 000 000 000 000 biljoen
- 1 000 000 000 000 000 biljardj

Unlike Dutch, the cardinal numerals of numbers greater than 1000 are not grouped in "multiples of 1000". This would be unnecessary because -èn- (and) is always added. 117 000 000 is written and pronounced as hóngerdjènzevetiëenmiljoen, without glottal stop. When hóngerdj-èn-zevetiëenmiljoen is written and pronounced, it means 100 + 17 000 00 which is 17 000 100, though normally 17 000 100 would be pronounced as zevetieënmiljoen-èn-hóngerdj.

1	2 348	117 401 067
2	tweeduizend driehonderdachtenveertig	honderdzeventien miljoen vierhonderdeenduizend zevenenzestig
3	twieëdoezjendj-èn-driehóngerdj-èn-ach-èn-veertig	hóngerdjènzevetiëenmiljoen-èn-veerhóngerdjèneindoezjendj-èn-zeve-n-èn-zèstig
1: Number, 2: Dutch, 3: Montfortian

=== Verbs ===
Many verbs are formed using compounds, like mit (with) + gaon (to go) = mitgaon (to join) Because most compounded verbs use irregular verbs in its compound, a large number of verbs is irregular. Because of the t-deletion it's very difficult to find a regular conjugation of the verbs. The following examples of the third person singular could all be seen as regular conjugations: hae kaltj (he talks, from kalle) hae sprèk (he speaks, from spraeke) hae wèt (he knows, from weite) hae löp (he walks, from loupe) hae veltj (he falls, from valle) hae mót (he has to/should have to, from mótte) and hae kaok (he cooks, from kaoke) Apart from this, many verbs are strong (vaje - veej - gevaje, to fold, bakke - beek - gebakke, to bake, weite - wus - geweite/gewus, to know and loupe - leep - geloupe, to walk) or totally irregular like höbbe (to have, hae haet) zeen (to be, hae is) zeen (to see, hae zuutj) gaon (to go, hae geitj) and so on.

Some conjugations might have another conjugation when the word order is changed. That's why both SV (subject - verb) and VS (verb - subject) are shown below. At least seven regular conjugations exist.

One of the strangest things of the verbs is the ènkelzief (inclusive) It is a compound of a root and -em (kalle → kallem) It is often said that -em derives from dem (him) kallem means dare to talk and is used the same way as the imperative. Doe (thou) can be used then to put pressure on the person. For example:

- Ópstankem èn kallem-doe!
  - (You!) Dare to stand up and dare to talk! (ópstankem → ópstaon)

==== First conjugation ====
This is the second largest group. All regular weak umlautless verb roots ending on j, l, n, r, t and w (without t-deletion)

kalle, to talk, to chat

First conjugation
	Present SV	Past SV	Present VS	Past VS	Subjunctive SV	Subjunctive VS
First person singular	ich kal	ich kaldje	kal ich	kaldje-n ich	ich kalle	kalle-n ich
Second person singular	doe kals	doe kaldjes	kals se	kaldjes se	doe kalle	kaller-doe
Third person singular	dae kaltj	dae kaldje	kaltj'r	kaldje d'r	dae kalle	kaller-dae
First person plural	weer kalle	weer kaldje	kaltj v'r	kaldje v'r	weer kalle	kalle v'r
Second person plural	geer kaltj	geer kaldje	kaltj g'r	kaldje g'r	geer kalle	kalletj g'r
Third person plural	die kalle	die kaldje	kalle die	kaldje die	die kalle	kaller-die
Other:	Infinitive	Gerund	Present particle	Past particle	Adjective	Adverb
Conjugation:	(tö) kalle	't kalle n	kallendj	gekaldj	gekaldj(e/e-n/er/es)	gekaldj(elik)
Other:	Noun	Imperative singular impolite	Imperative singular polite	Imperative dual	Imperative plural	Ènkelzief
Conjugation:	't gekal n	kal!	kaltj!	kal(le)tj!	kaltj!	kallem

==== Second conjugation ====
This is a small group. All regular strong umlaut-having verb roots ending on -aeV.

braeke, to break

Second conjugation
	Present SV	Past SV	Present VS	Past VS	Subjunctive SV	Subjunctive VS
First person singular	ich braek	ich braak	braek ich	braak ich	ich braeke	braeke-n ich
Second person singular	doe brèks	doe braaks	brèks se	braaks se	doe braeke	braeker-doe
Third person singular	dae brèk	dae braak	brèk t'r	braak t'r	dae braeke	braeker-dae
First person plural	weer braeke	weer brake	bröktj v'r	brake v'r	weer braeke	braeke v'r
Second person plural	geer brèk(tj)	geer braak	brèk(tj) g'r	braak g'r	geer braeke	braeketj g'r
Third person plural	die braeke	die brake	braeke die	brake die	die braeke	braeker-die
Other:	Infinitive	Gerund	Present particle	Past particle	Adjective	Adverb
Conjugation:	(tö) braeke	't braeke n	braekendj	gebraoke	gebraoke(-n/r/s)	gebraoke(lik)
Other:	Noun	Imperative singular impolite	Imperative singular polite	Imperative dual	Imperative plural	Ènkelzief
Conjugation:	't gebraek n	braek!	brèktj!	braektj!	brèktj!	brèkkem

==== Third conjugation ====
This is a small group. All regular weak umlaut-having verb roots ending on -eiV.

zweite, to sweat

Third conjugation
	Present SV	Past SV	Present VS	Past VS	Subjunctive SV	Subjunctive VS
First person singular	ich zweit	ich zweitdje	zweit ich	zweitdje-n ich	ich zweite	zweite-n ich
Second person singular	doe zwèts	doe zweitdjes	zwèts se	zweitdjes se	doe zweite	zwètter-doe
Third person singular	dae zwèt(j)	dae zweitdje	zwèt t'r, zwètj'r	zweitdje d'r	dae zweite	zwètter-dae
First person plural	weer zweite	weer zweitdje	zwètj v'r	zweitdje v'r	weer zweite	zweite v'r
Second person plural	geer zwèt(j)	geer zweitdje	zwèt(j) g'r	zweitdje g'r	geer zweite	zwèttetj g'r
Third person plural	die zweite	die zweitdje	zweite die	zweitdje die	die zweite	zweiter-die
Other:	Infinitive	Gerund	Present particle	Past particle	Adjective	Adverb
Conjugation:	(tö) zweite	't zweite n	zweitendj	gezweite	gezwètj(e/e-n/er/es)	gezwètj(elik)
Other:	Noun	Imperative singular impolite	Imperative singular polite	Imperative dual	Imperative plural	Ènkelzief
Conjugation:	't gezweit n	zweit!	zwètj!	zweitj!	zwètj!	zweitem

==== Fourth conjugation ====
This is the largest group. All regular weak umlautless verb roots ending in b, ch, d, f, g, k, p, and s (with t-deletion)

kaoke, to cook

Forth conjugation
	Present SV	Past SV	Present VS	Past VS	Subjunctive SV	Subjunctive VS
First person singular	ich kaok	ich kaokdje	kaok ich	kaokdje-n ich	ich kaoke	kaoke-n ich
Second person singular	doe kaoks	doe kaokdjes	kaoks se	kaokdjes se	doe kaoke	kaoker-doe
Third person singular	dae kaok	dae kaokdje	kaok t'r	kaokdje d'r	dae kaoke	kaoker-dae
First person plural	weer kaoke	weer kaokdje	kaoktj v'r	kaokdje v'r	weer kaoke	kaoke v'r
Second person plural	geer kaok(tj)	geer kaokdje	kaok(tj) g'r	kaokdje g'r	geer kaoke	kaoketj g'r
Third person plural	die kaoke	die kaokdje	kaoke die	kaokdje die	die kaoke	kaoker-die
Other:	Infinitive	Gerund	Present particle	Past particle	Adjective	Adverb
Conjugation:	(tö) kaoke	't kaoke n	kaokendj	gekaok(dj)	gekaok(dje/dje-n/djer/djes)	gekaok(djelik)
Other:	Noun	Imperative singular impolite	Imperative singular polite	Imperative dual	Imperative plural	Ènkelzief
Conjugation:	't gekaok n	kaok!	kaok(tj)!	kaoketj!	kaoktj!	kaokem

==== Fifth conjugation ====
This is the third largest group. All regular weak umlaut-having verb roots ending on -ouV.

doupe, to baptise

Fifth conjugation
	Present SV	Past SV	Present VS	Past VS	Subjunctive SV	Subjunctive VS
First person singular	ich doup	ich doupdje	doup ich	doupe-n ich	ich doupe	doupe-n ich
Second person singular	doe döps	doe doupdjes	döps se	doupdjes se	doe doupe	douper-doe
Third person singular	dae döp	dae doupdje	döp t'r	doupdje d'r	dae doupe	douper-dae
First person plural	weer doupe	weer doupdje	döptj v'r	doupdje v'r	weer doupe	doupe v'r
Second person plural	geer döp(tj)	geer doupdje	döp(tj) g'r	doupdje g'r	geer doupe	doupetj g'r
Third person plural	die doupe	die doupdje	doupe die	doupdje die	die doupe	douper-die
Other:	Infinitive	Gerund	Present particle	Past particle	Adjective	Adverb
Conjugation:	(tö) doupe	't doupe n	doupendj	gedoup	gedoup(dje/dje-n/djer/djes)	gedoup(djelik)
Other:	Noun	Imperative singular impolite	Imperative singular polite	Imperative dual	Imperative plural	Ènkelzief
Conjugation:	't gedoup n	doup!	doup(tj)!	doupetj!	douptj!	doupem

==== Sixth conjugation ====
This is the fourth largest group. All regular weak umlaut-having verb roots ending on -aV. All regular weak umlaut-having verb roots ending on -aaV use -aeV instead of -eV.

bevalle, to enjoy

Forth conjugation
	Present SV	Past SV	Present VS	Past VS	Subjunctive SV	Subjunctive VS
First person singular	ich beval	ich bevaldje	beval ich	bevaldje-n ich	ich bevalle	bevalle-n ich
Second person singular	doe bevels	doe bevaldjes	bevels se	bevaldjes se	doe bevalle	bevaller-doe
Third person singular	dae beveltj	dae bevaldje	beveltj'r	bevaldje d'r	dae bevalle	bevaller-dae
First person plural	weer bevalle	weer bevaldje	beveltj v'r	bevaldje v'r	weer bevalle	bevalle v'r
Second person plural	geer bevaltj	geer bevaldje	bevaltj g'r	bevaldje g'r	geer bevalle	bevalletj g'r
Third person plural	die bevalle	die bevaldje	bevalle die	bevaldje die	die bevalle	bevaller-die
Other:	Infinitive	Gerund	Present particle	Past particle	Adjective	Adverb
Conjugation:	(tö) bevalle	't bevalle n	bevallendj	bevalle	bevalledj(e/e-n/er/es)	bevallendj(elik)
Other:	Noun	Imperative singular impolite	Imperative singular polite	Imperative dual	Imperative plural	Ènkelzief
Conjugation:	't beval n	beval!	beval(tj)!	bevelletj!	bevaltj!	bevallem

==== Seventh conjugation ====
The size of this group is unknown. It is often seen as a part of the first conjugation. All regular weak umlautless verb roots ending on -m.

keime, to comb (your hair)

Seventh conjugation
	Present SV	Past SV	Present VS	Past VS	Subjunctive SV	Subjunctive VS
First person singular	ich keim	ich keimdje	keim ich	keimdje-n ich	ich keime	keime-n ich
Second person singular	doe keims	doe keimdjes	keims se	keimdjes se	doe keime	keimer-doe
Third person singular	dae keimp	dae keimdje	keimp t'r	keimdje d'r	dae keime	keimer-dae
First person plural	weer keime	weer keimdje	keimp v'r	keimdje v'r	weer keime	keime v'r
Second person plural	geer keimp	geer keimdje	keimp g'r	keimdje g'r	geer keime	keimetj g'r
Third person plural	die keime	die keimdje	keime die	keimdje die	die keime	keimer-die
Other:	Infinitive	Gerund	Present particle	Past particle	Adjective	Adverb
Conjugation:	(tö) keime	't keime n	keimendj	gekeimp	gekeimp(dje/dje-n/djer/djes)	gekeimp(djelik)
Other:	Noun	Imperative singular impolite	Imperative singular polite	Imperative dual	Imperative plural	Ènkelzief
Conjugation:	't gekeim n	keim!	keim(p)!	keimetj!	keimp!	keimpem

== Sources ==
- Bakkes, Pierre (2007), Mofers Waordebook, Stichting Mofers Waordebook, ISBN 978-90-9022294-3
