= Melick =

Melick may refer to:

- Charles W. Melick, head coach of the University of Maryland college football program
- Melick en Herkenbosch now the municipality of Roerdalen
- Balthazar P. Melick (1770–1835), also known as Baltus P. Melick, founder of Chemical Bank and Melick & Burger
- Melica, a genus of grasses
