= Ambt Montfort =

Coordinates: 51°07′N 5°57′E

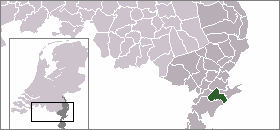
Municipality of Ambt Montfort in Limburg.

Flag of Ambt Montfort

Ambt Montfort (Dutch pronunciation: [ɑmpt ˈmɔntfɔrt]) is a former municipality in the Dutch province of Limburg.

In 1991, the municipalities of Montfort, Posterholt, Reutje and Sint Odiliënberg merged. The original name of the merged municipality was "Posterholt", but it was changed in "Ambt Montfort" in 1994. On January 1, 2007, Ambt Montfort merged into the municipality of Roerdalen.

Ambt Montfort is the birthplace of Formula One driver Jos Verstappen.
