= Posterholt =

- Village
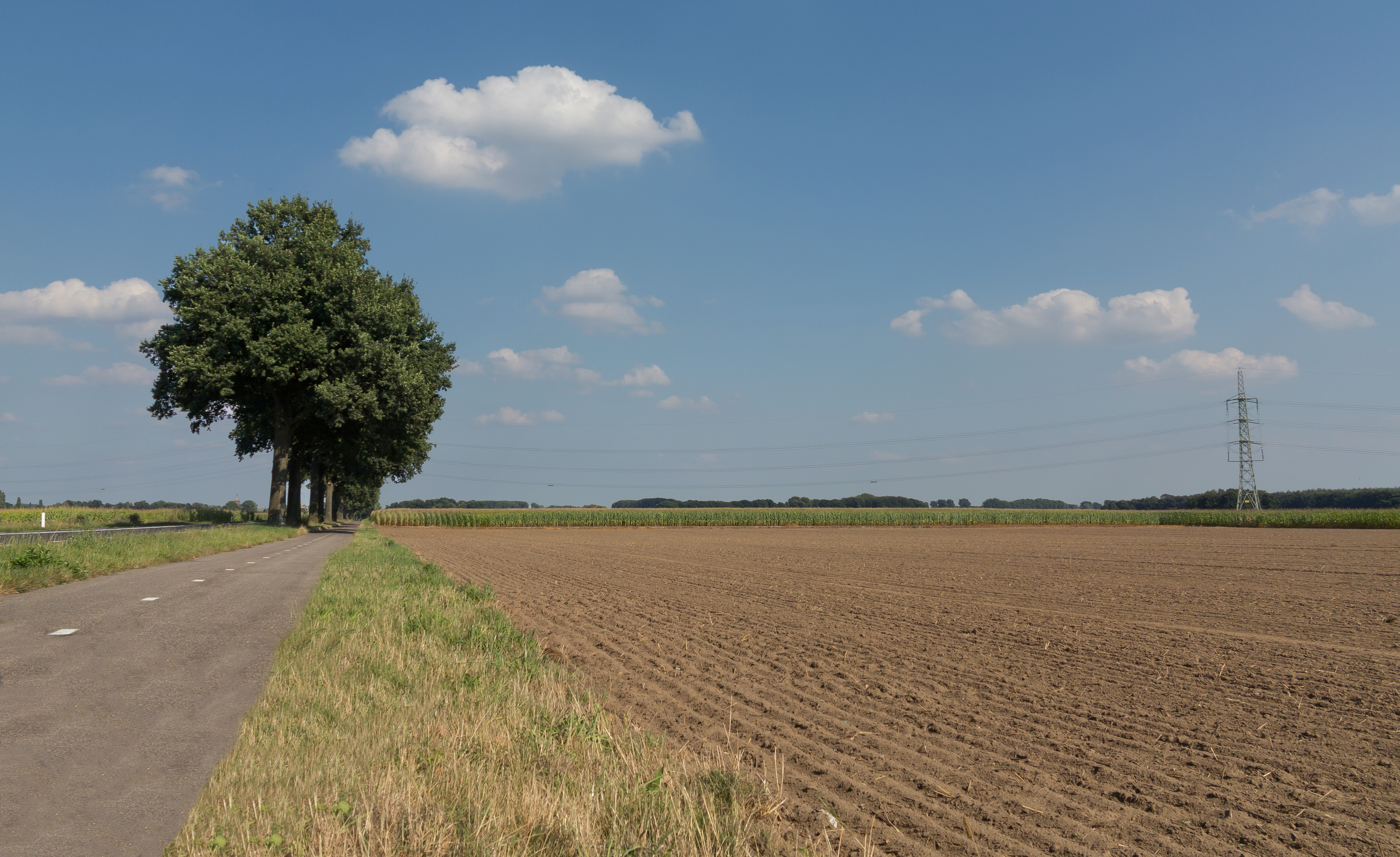
- Road panorama near Posterholt

- Flag Coat of arms

- Location in the Netherlands Location in the province of Limburg in the Netherlands
- Coordinates: 51°07′20″N 6°02′10″E
- Country: Netherlands
- Province: Limburg
- Municipality: Roerdalen

Area
  - Total: 9.30 km^{2} (3.59 sq mi)
- Elevation: 25 m (82 ft)

Population (2021)
  - Total: 3,730
  - Density: 401/km^{2} (1,040/sq mi)
- Time zone: UTC+1 (CET)
  - Summer (DST): UTC+2 (CEST)
- Postal code: 6060-6061
- Dialing code: 0475
- Major roads: N274, N293

Posterholt is a village in the Dutch province of Limburg. It is located in the municipality of Roerdalen.

== History ==
The village was first mentioned in 1147 as Posterholt. The etymology is unclear. Posterholt is a linear forest cultivation village from the 12th century. It became an independent parish in 1793.

The Catholic St Mathias was built between 1950 and 1951 to replace the earlier church which was destroyed in 1945. The tower was added between 1961 and 1962. The Aerwinckel estate was built in 1856 and designed by Pierre Cuypers to replace the medieval castle.

Posterholt was home to 605 people in 1840. It merged with the municipalities Montfort and Sint Odiliënberg in 1991, and the new municipality changed its name to Ambt Montfort three years later. In 2007, it became part of the municipality of Roerdalen.

Together with a few other villages in the region it has also an active local history association. This association is situated in St. Odiliënberg.

== Gallery ==
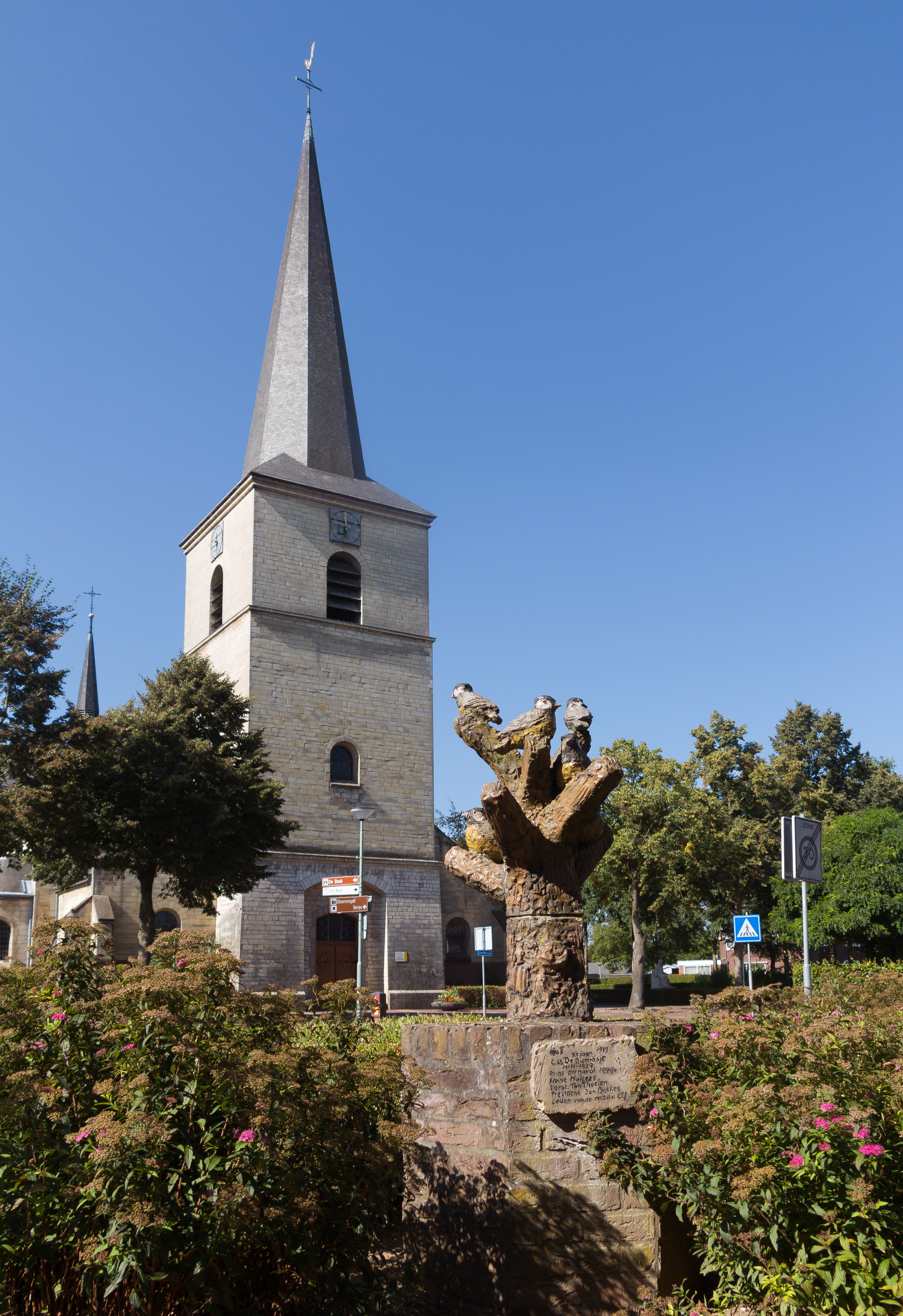
carnival sculpture and the St Matthias Church

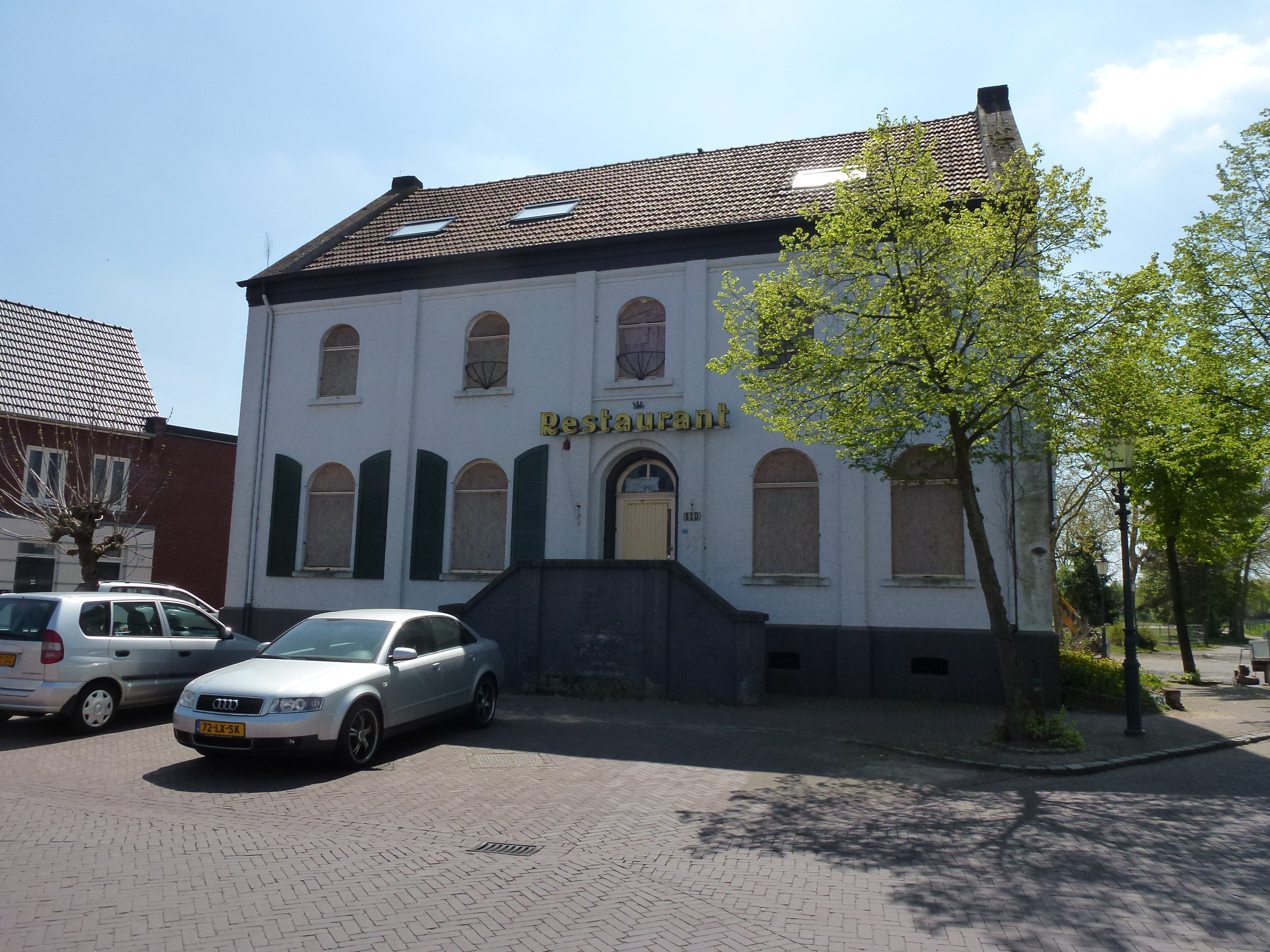
Former town hall. Now a restaurant

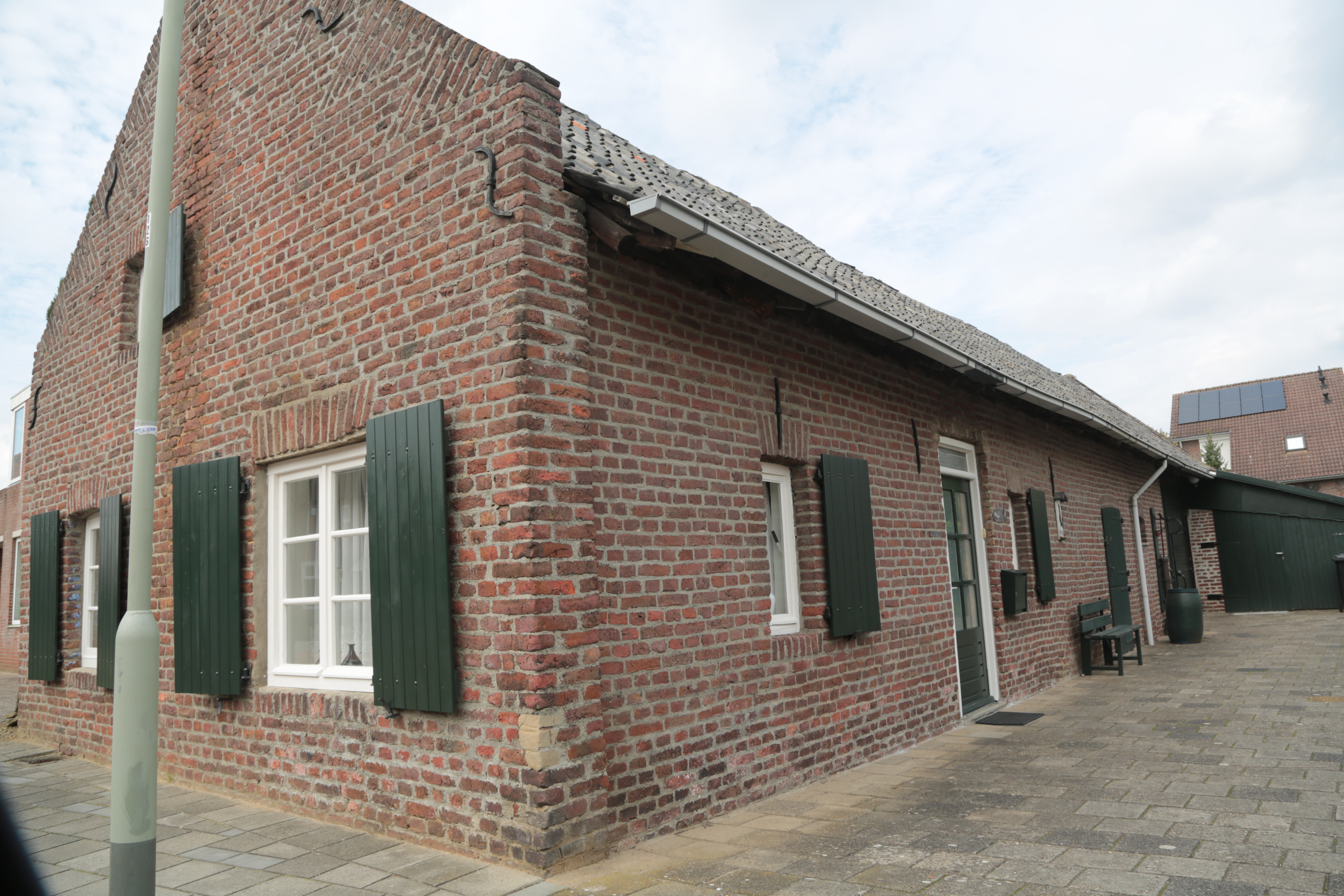
House in Posterholt

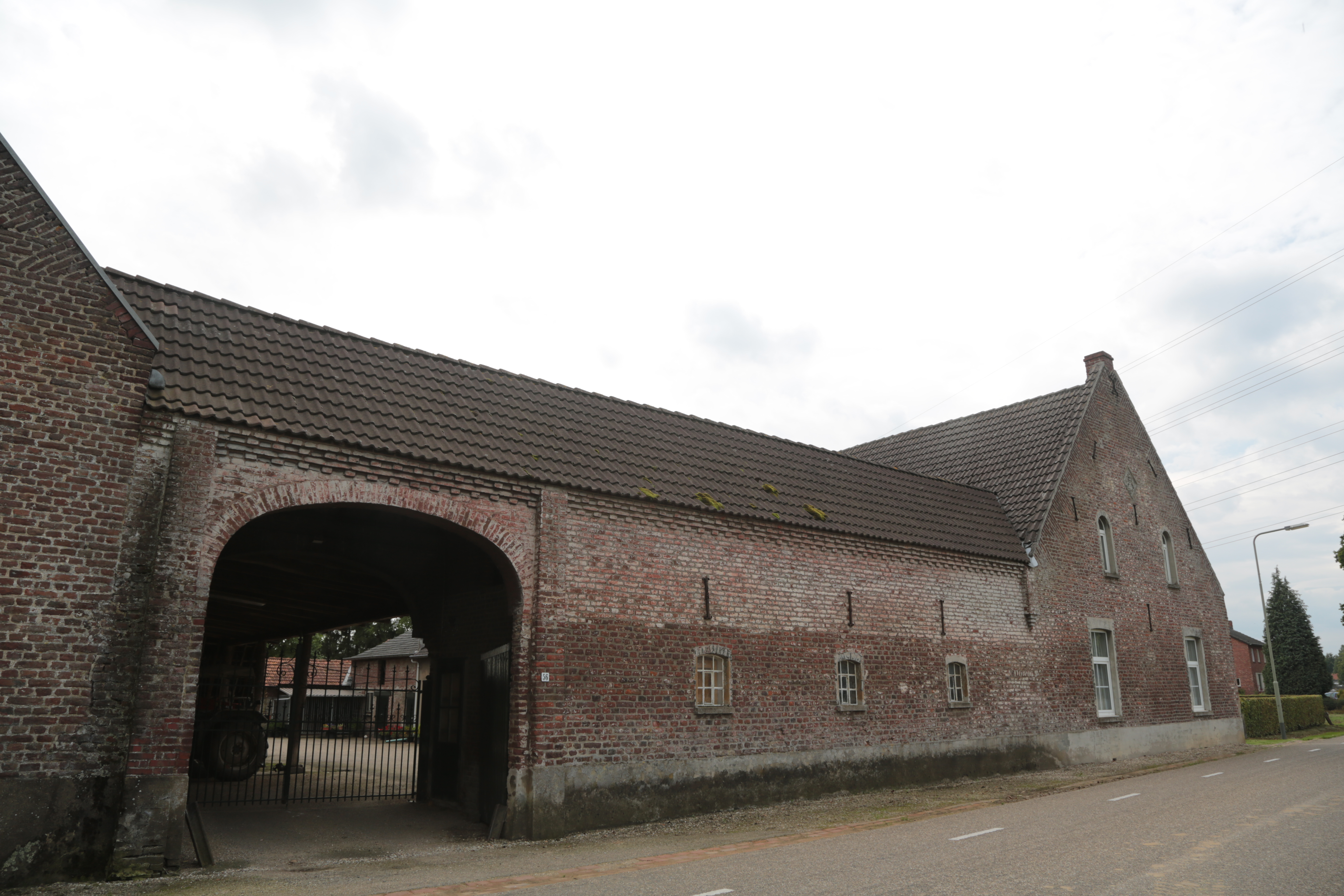
Farm in Posterholt
