= Roerdalen =

Roerdalen Roerdale
- Municipality
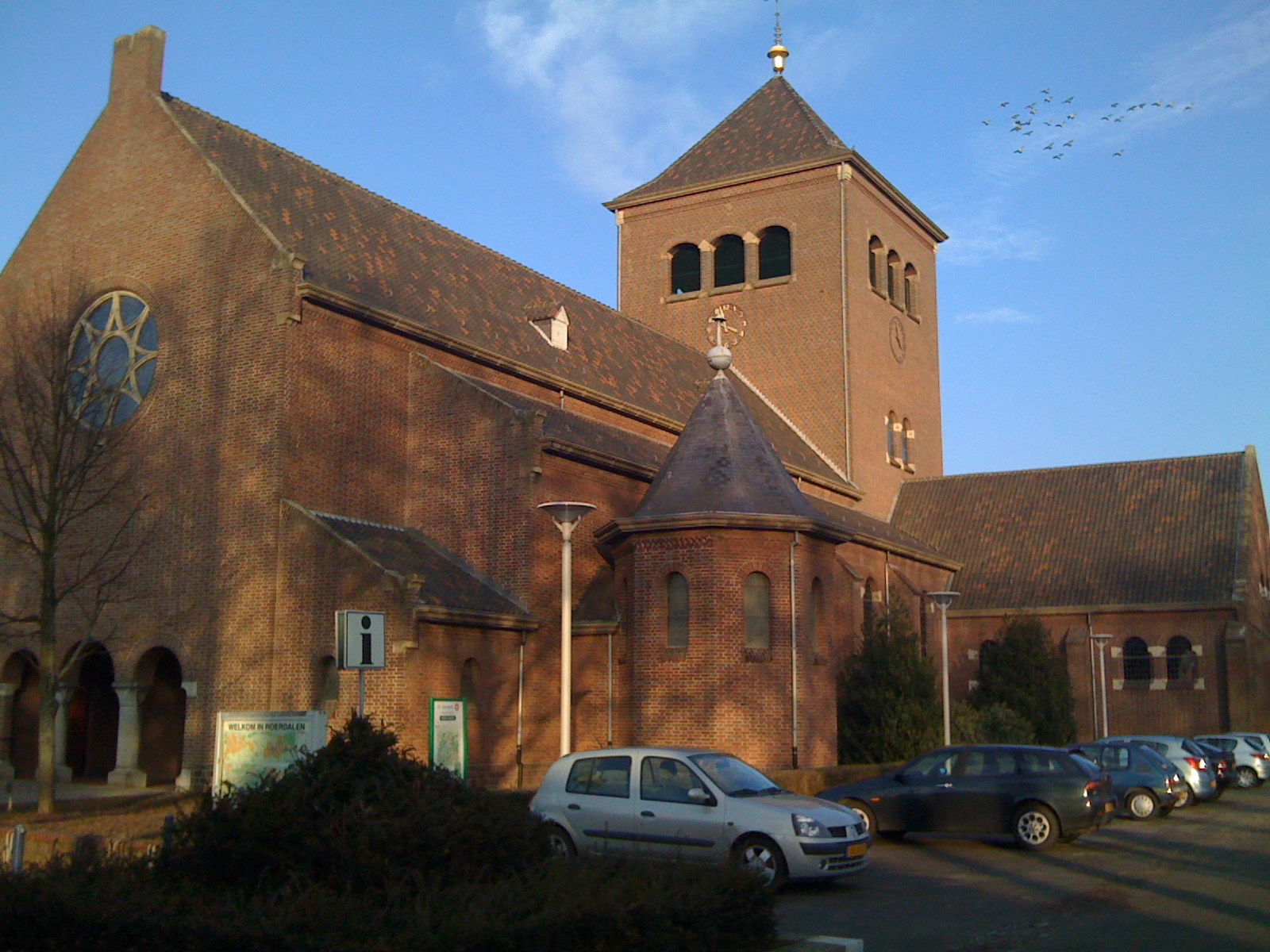
- Church in Melick

- Flag Coat of arms

- Location in Limburg

- Location in the Netherlands
- Coordinates: 51°9′N 6°0′E
- Country: Netherlands
- Province: Limburg
- Established: 1 January 1991

Government
  - Body: Municipal council
  - Mayor: Jeffrey van Agtmaal (CDA)

Area
  - Total: 88.79 km^{2} (34.28 sq mi)
  - Land: 88.21 km^{2} (34.06 sq mi)
  - Water: 0.58 km^{2} (0.22 sq mi)
- Elevation: 28 m (92 ft)

Population (January 2021)
  - Total: 20,580
  - Density: 233/km^{2} (600/sq mi)
- Time zone: UTC+1 (CET)
  - Summer (DST): UTC+2 (CEST)
- Postcode: 6060–6065, 6074–6077
- Area code: 0475
- Website: www.roerdalen.nl

Roerdalen (Dutch: [ruːrˈdaːlə(n)]; Limburgish: Roerdale [ʀuːʀˈdaːlə]) is a municipality in the southeastern Netherlands, in the province of Limburg. As of January 2021, it had about 20580 inhabitants and borders Germany.

Roerdalen is the renaming of the municipality of Melick en Herkenbosch in 1993.

== Population centres ==
- Herkenbosch
- Melick
- Montfort
- Posterholt
- Reutje
- Sint Odiliënberg
- Vlodrop

=== Topography ===
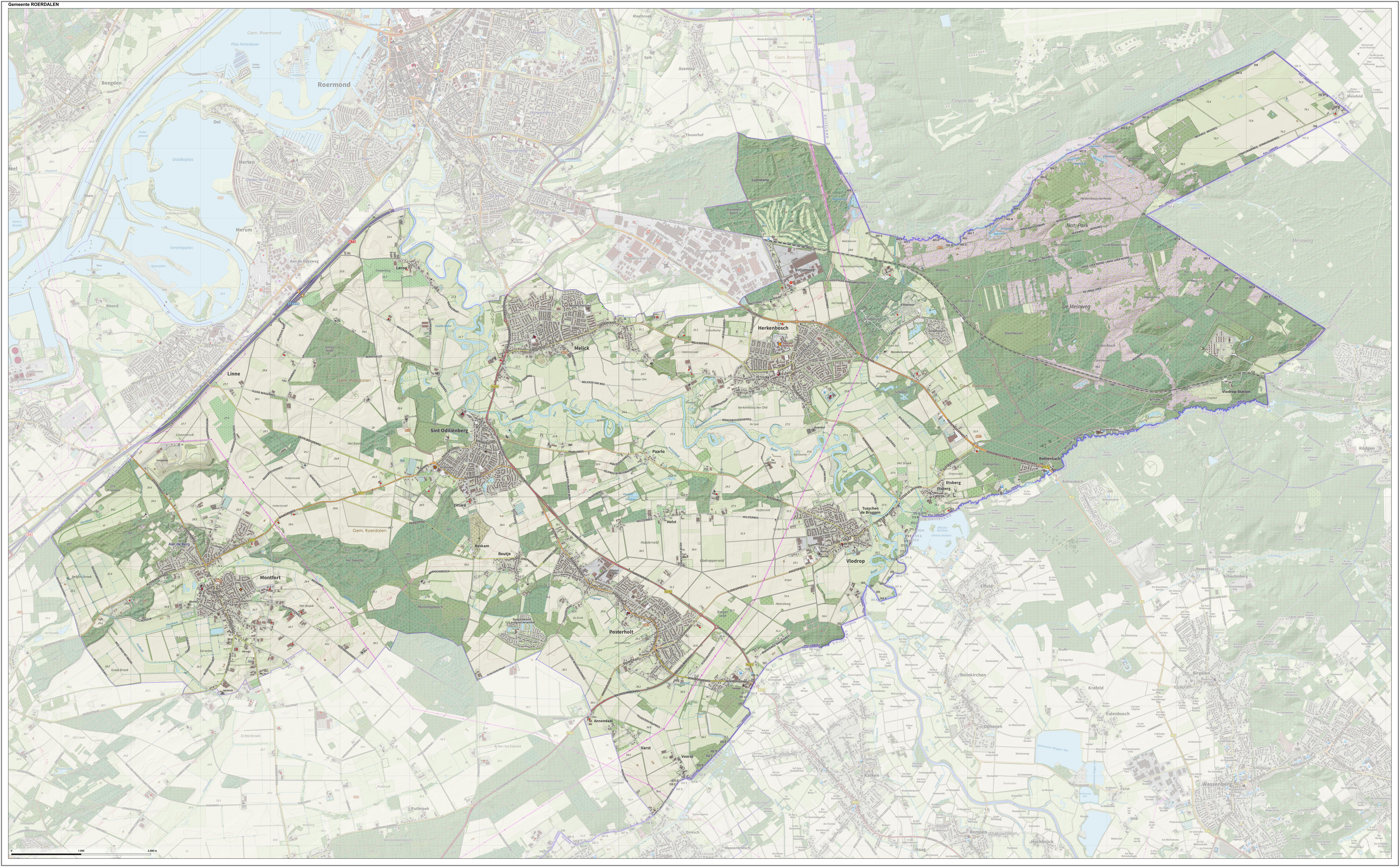

Dutch Topographic map of the municipality of Roerdalen, June 2015

== Notable people ==
- Hubert Biermans (1864 in Herkenbosch - 1953) a Dutch and Canadian businessman
- Connie Palmen (born 1955 in Sint Odiliënberg) a Dutch author
- Geert Chatrou (born 1969 in Sint Odiliënberg) a professional whistler
- Jos Verstappen (born 1972 in Montfort) a Dutch former racing driver
- Joeri Verlinden (born 1988 in Melick) a Dutch swimmer, competed at the 2016 Summer Olympics

== Gallery ==
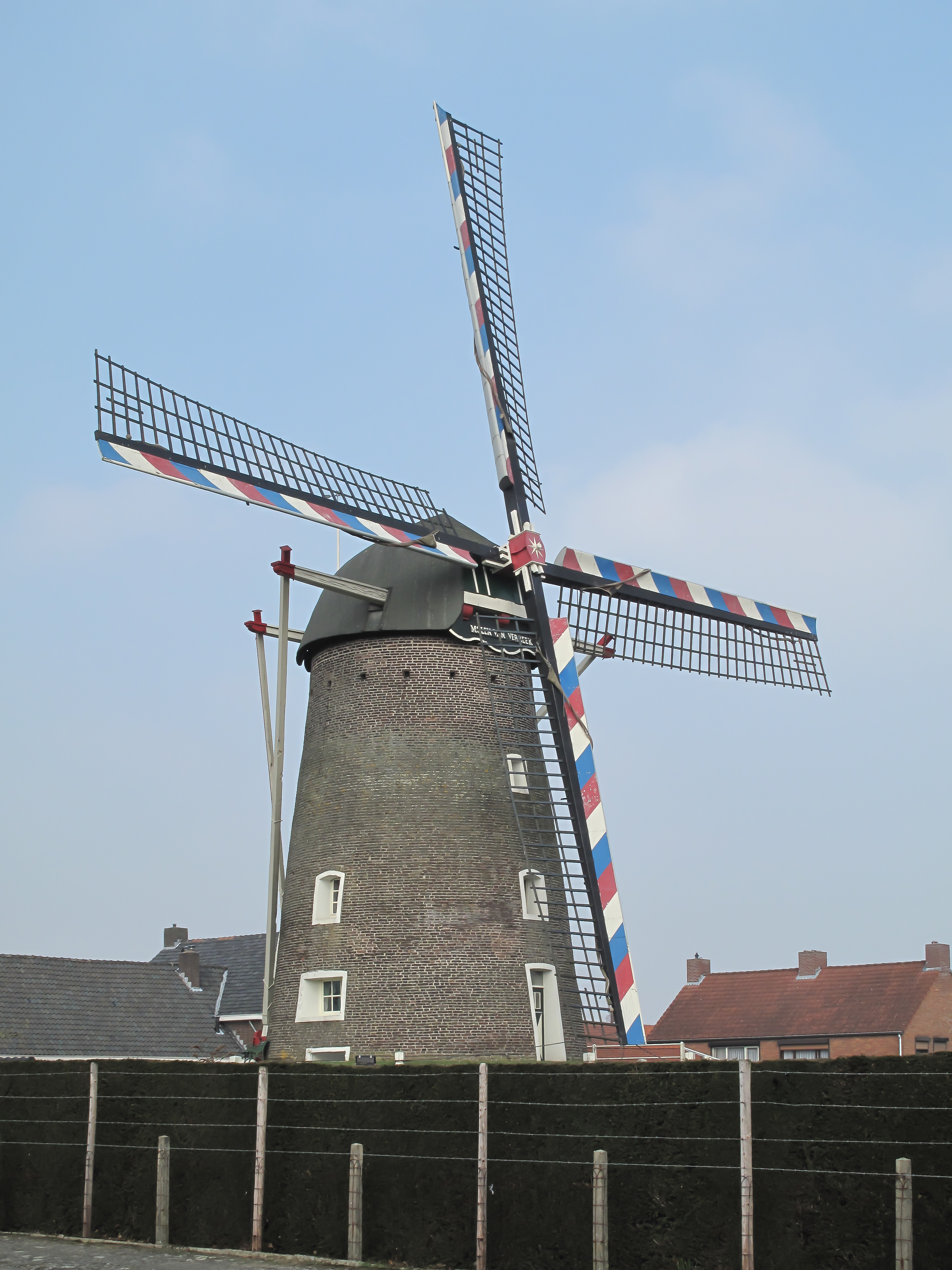
Windmill (molen van Verbeek) in Sint Odiliënberg

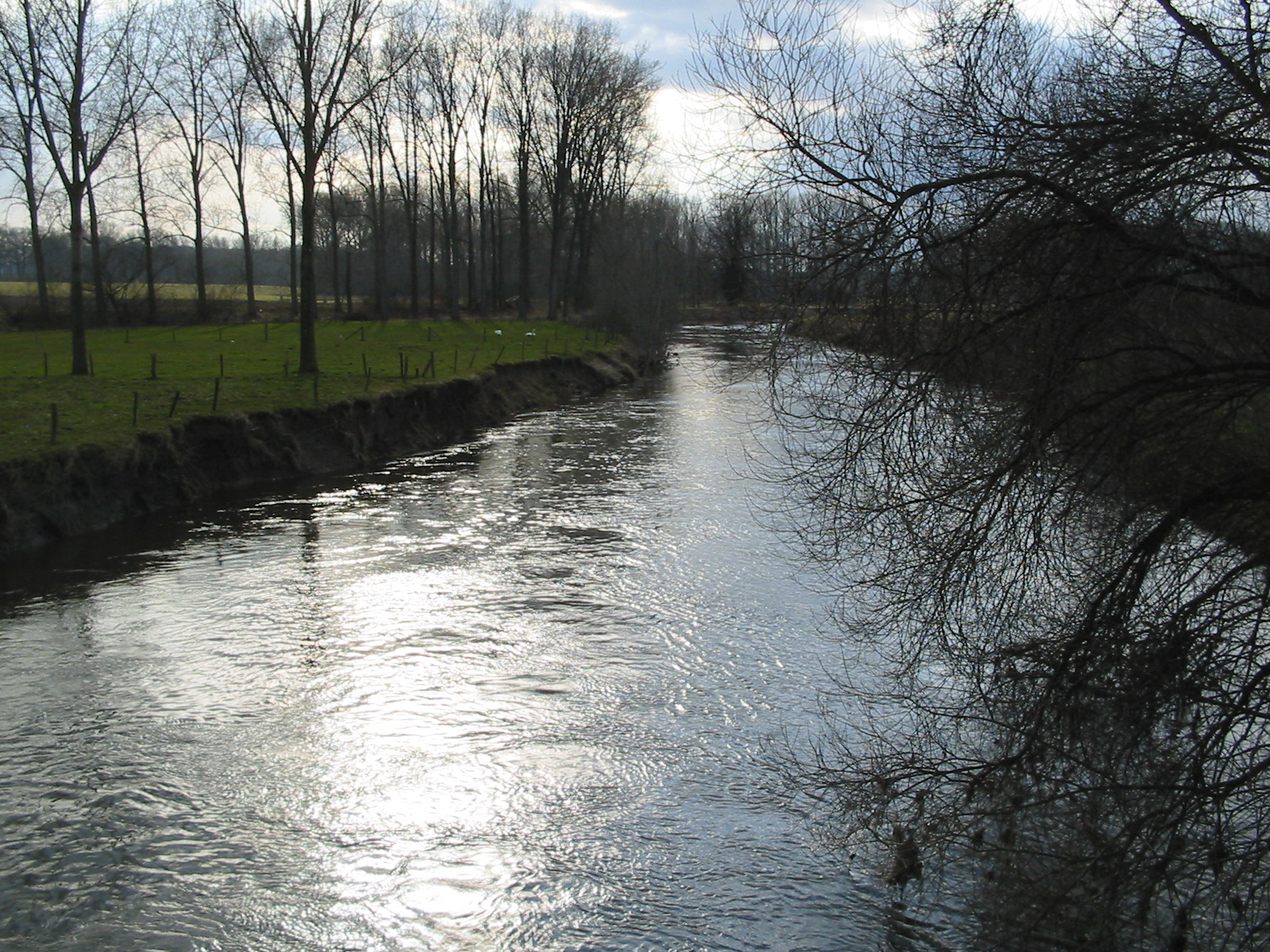
River Roer

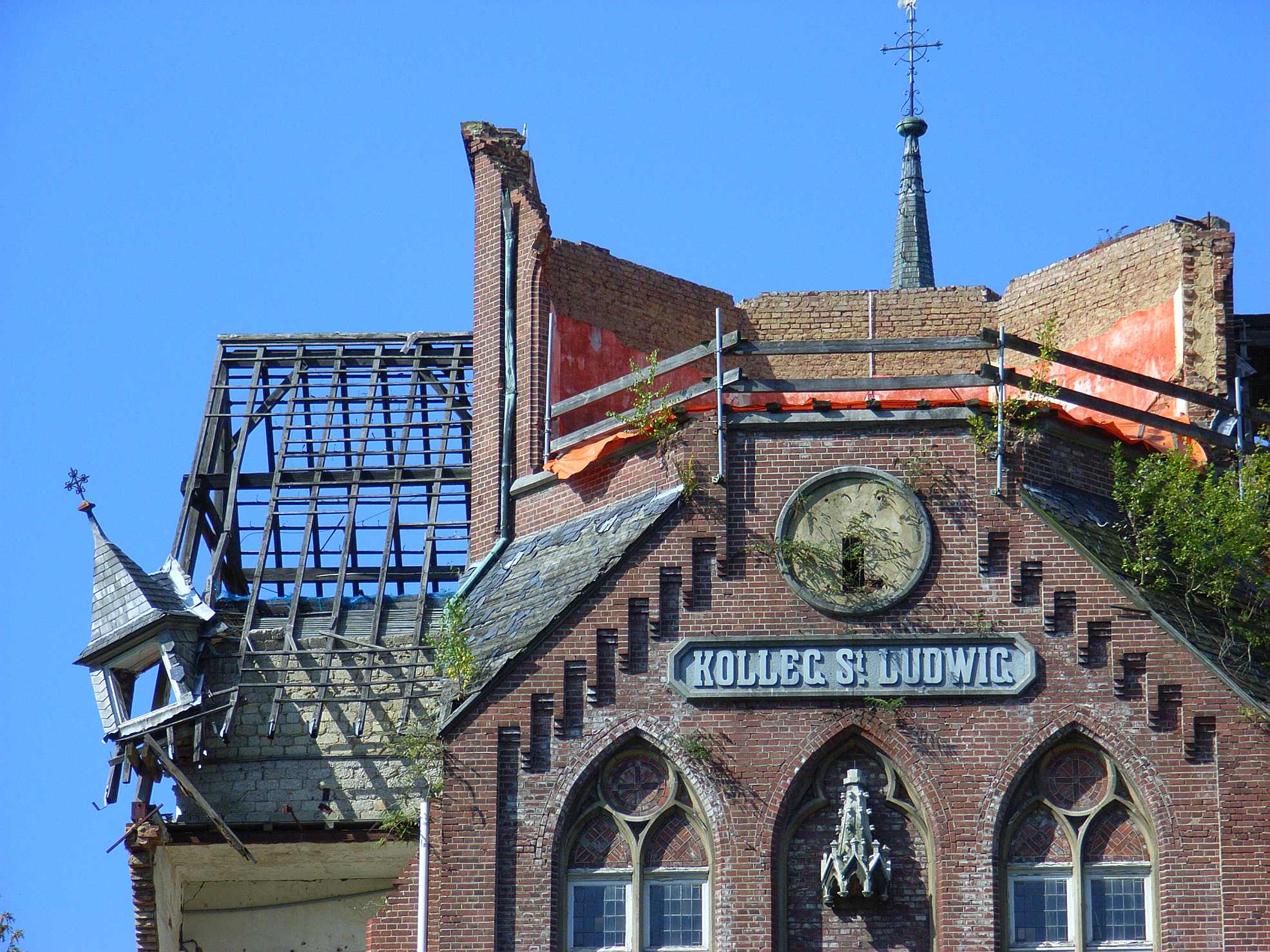
Ruined Building detail of Kolleg St. Ludwig

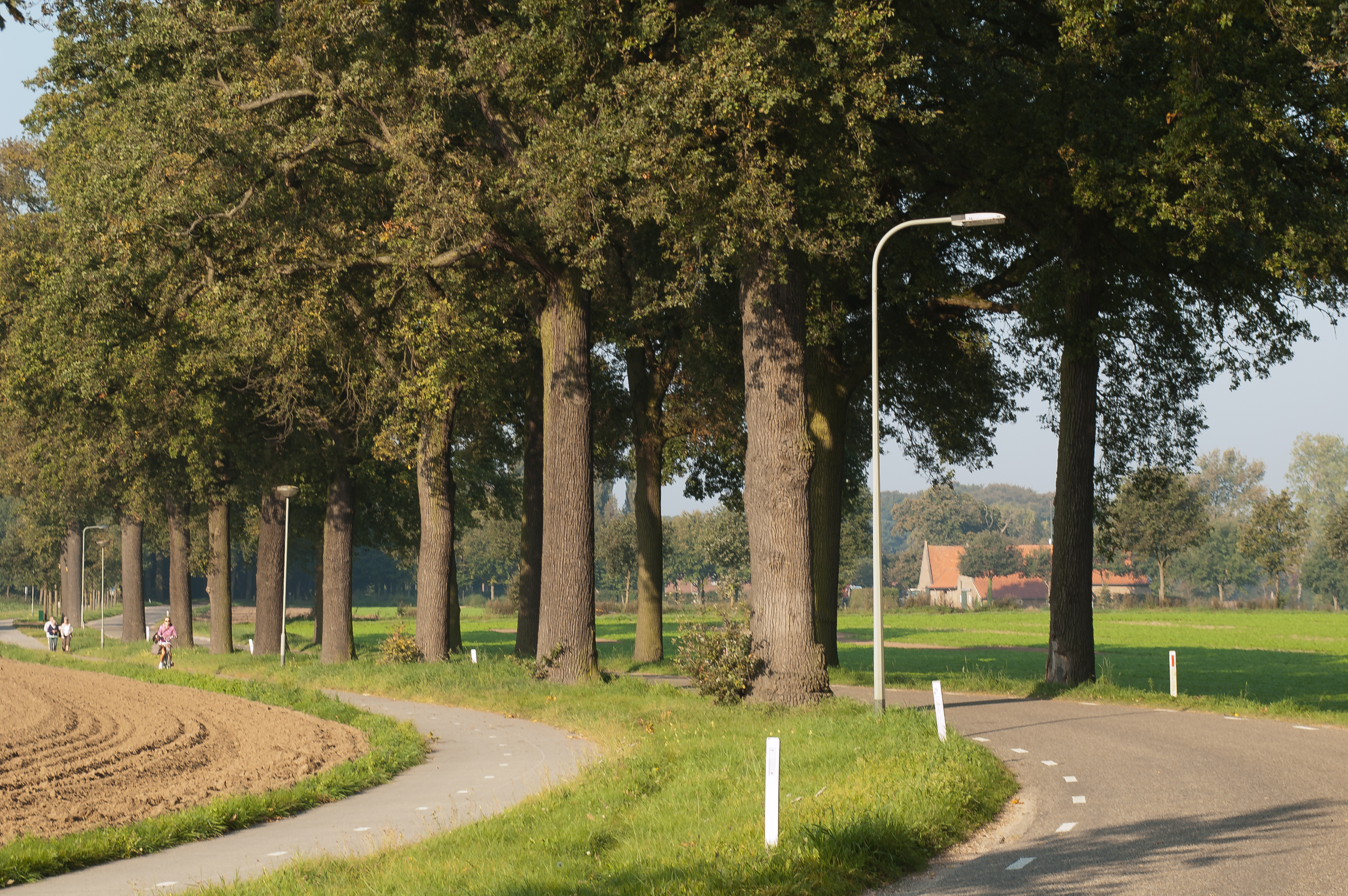
Road between St. Odilienberg Paarlo, looking towards St. Odilienberg

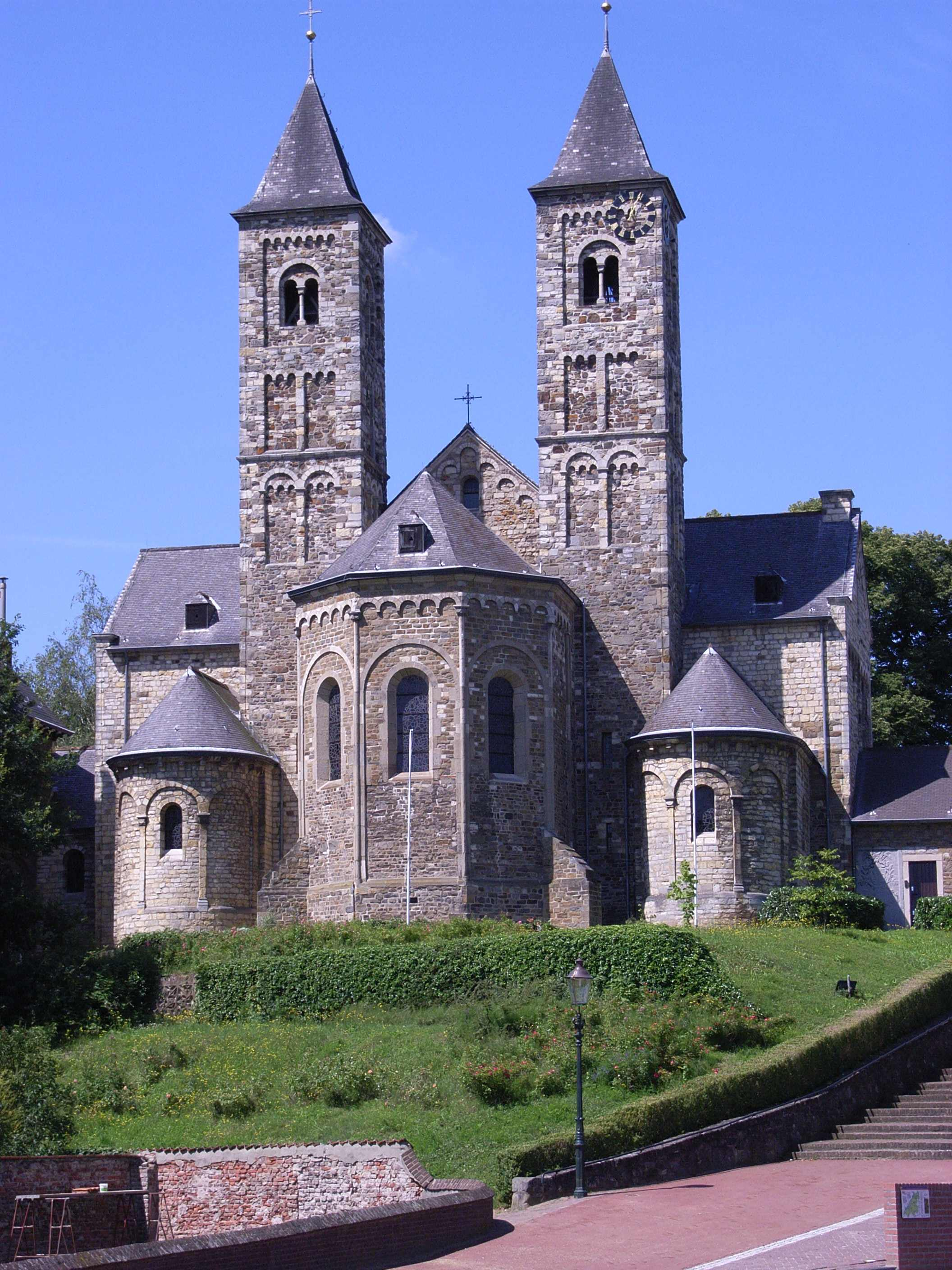
Basiliek van de H.H. Wiro

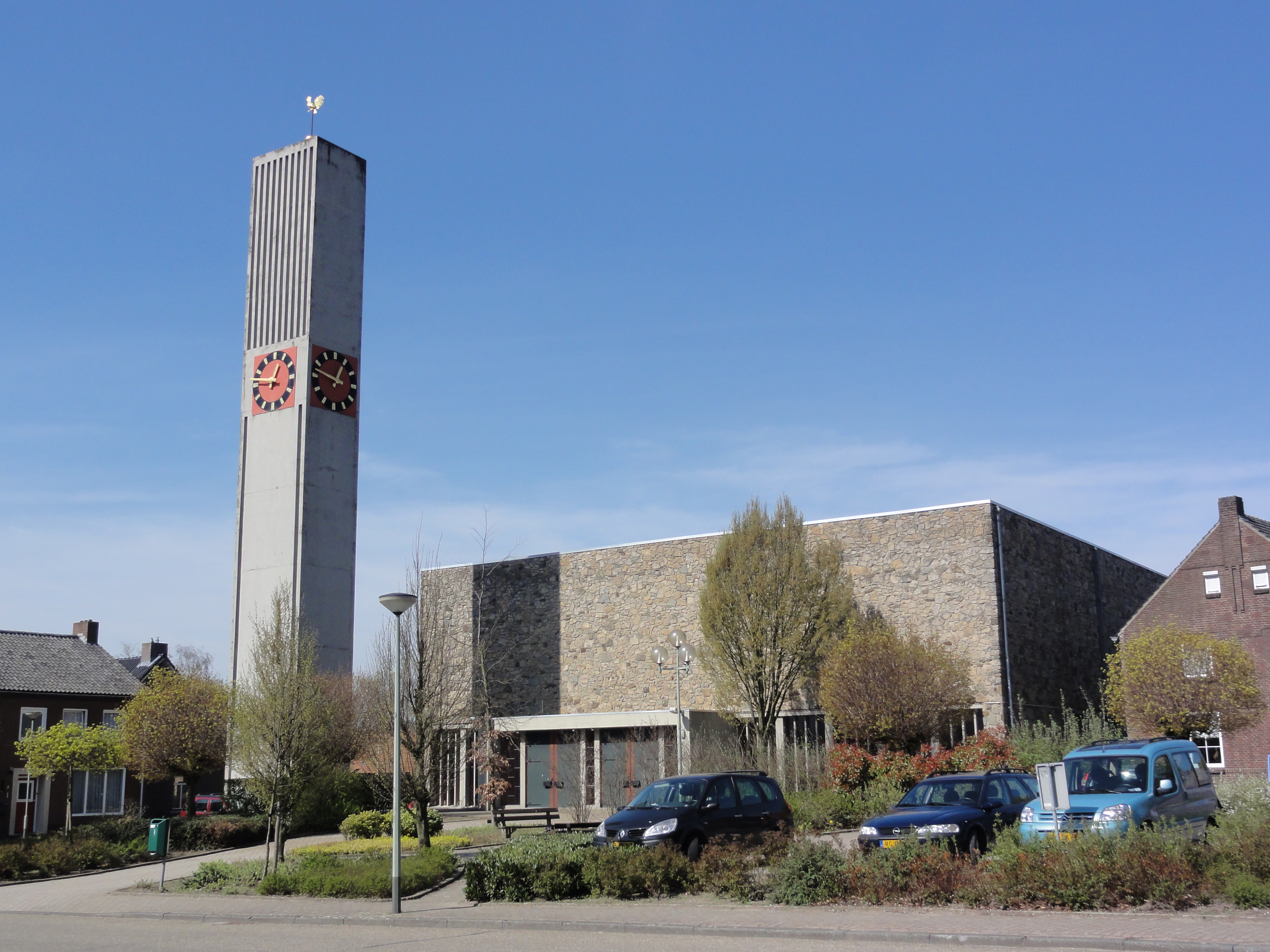
Montfort church

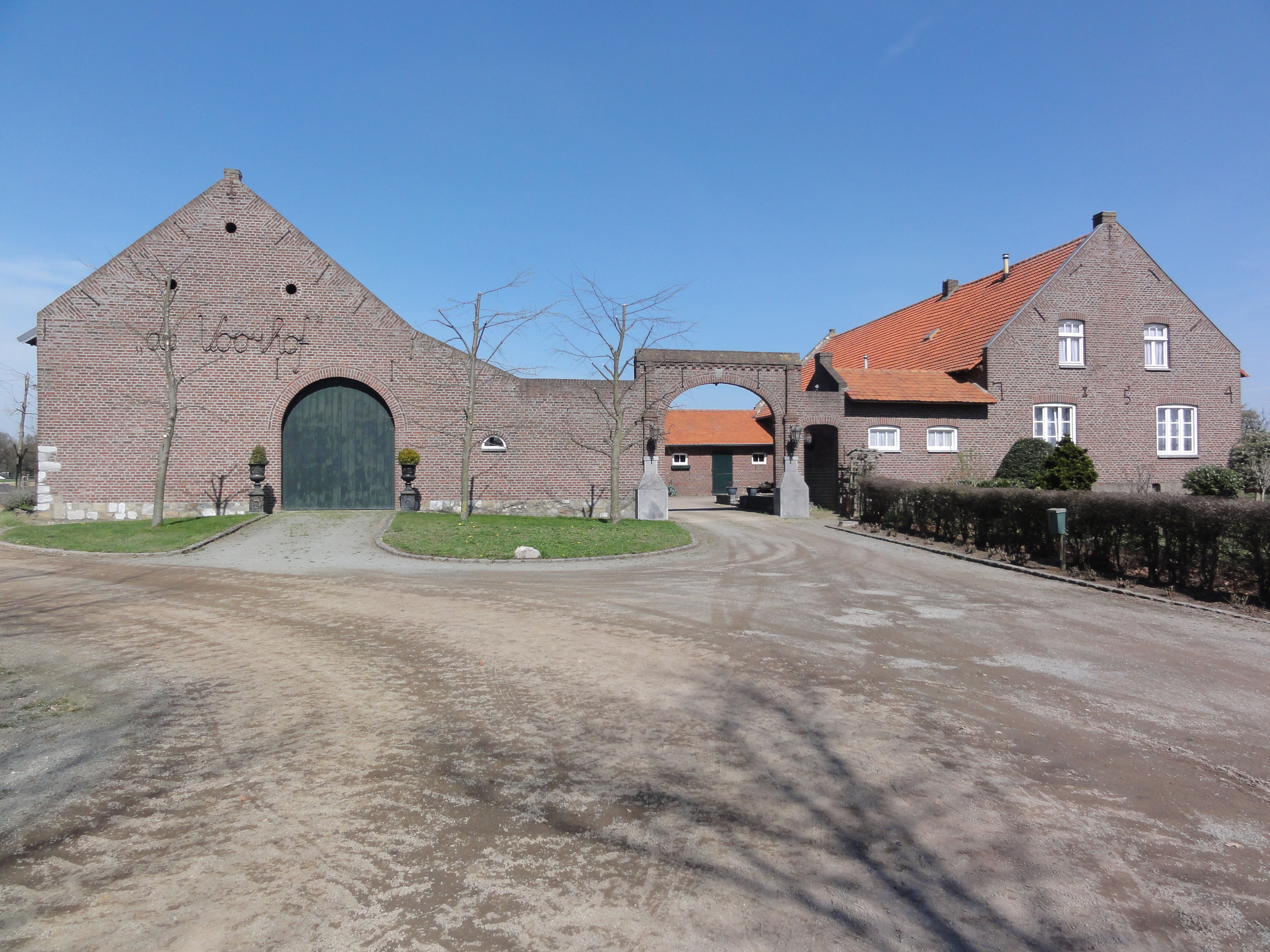
Voorhof

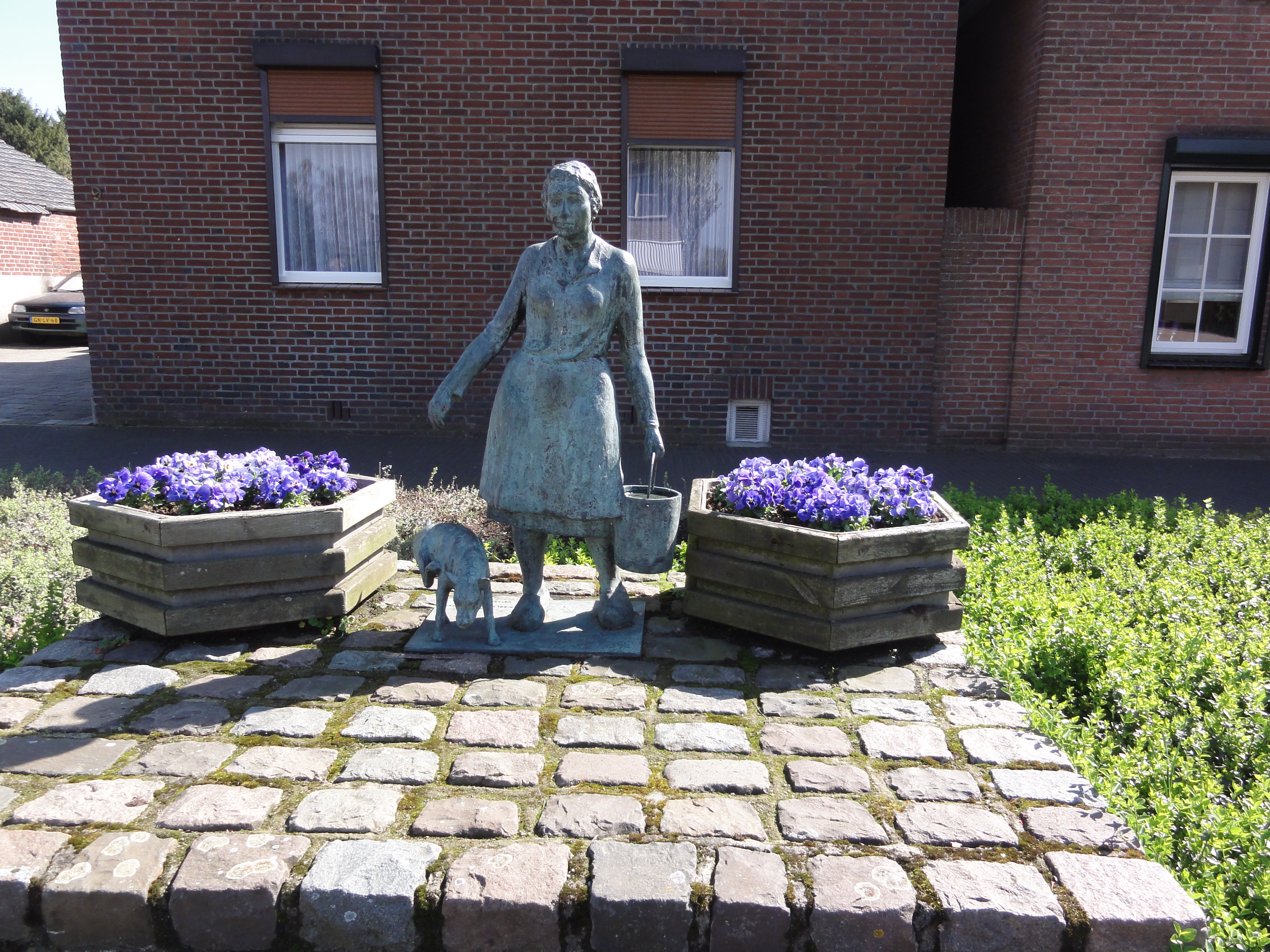
Sculpture by Nicolas van Ronkenstein

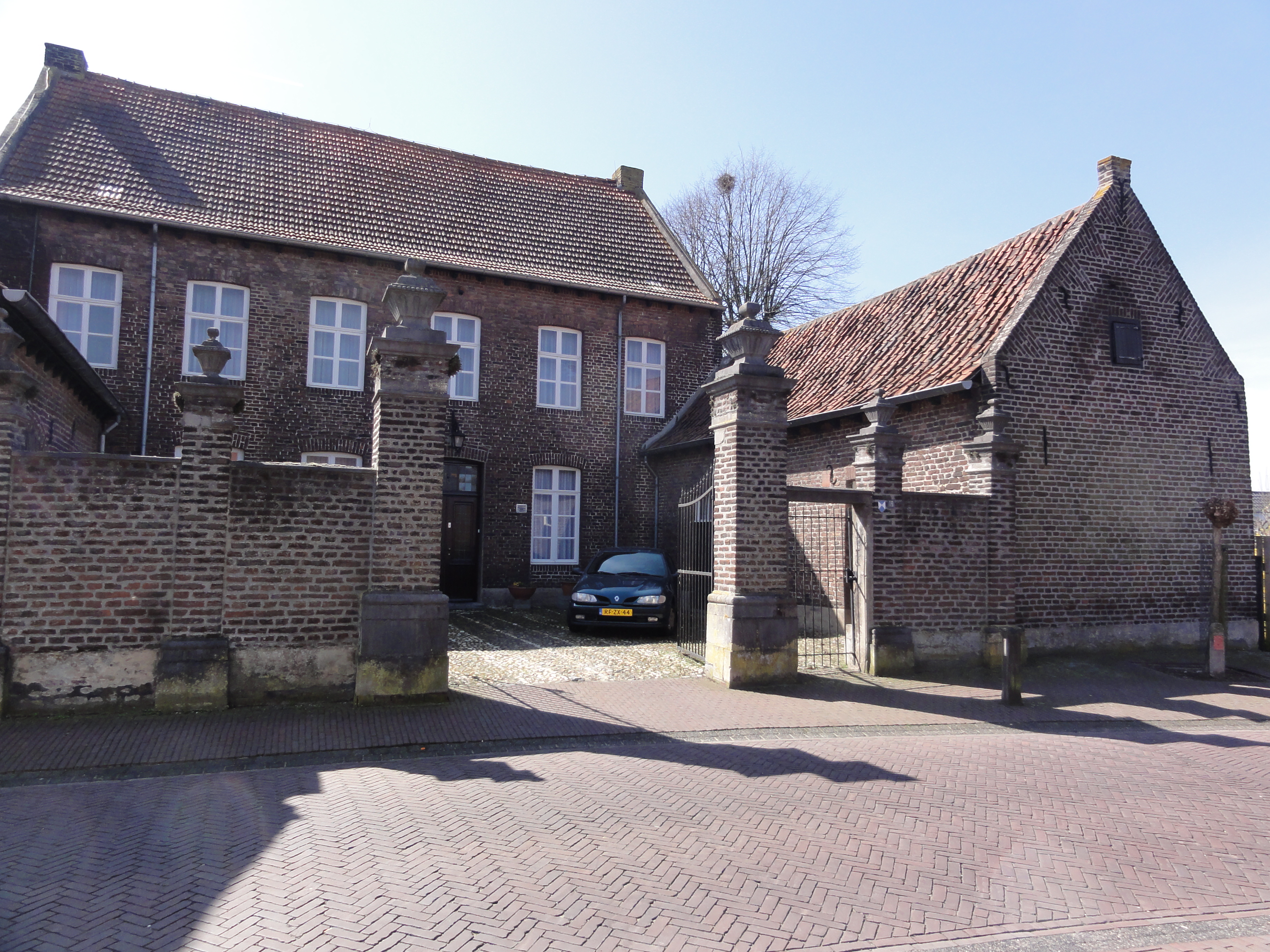
Montfort former vicarage.

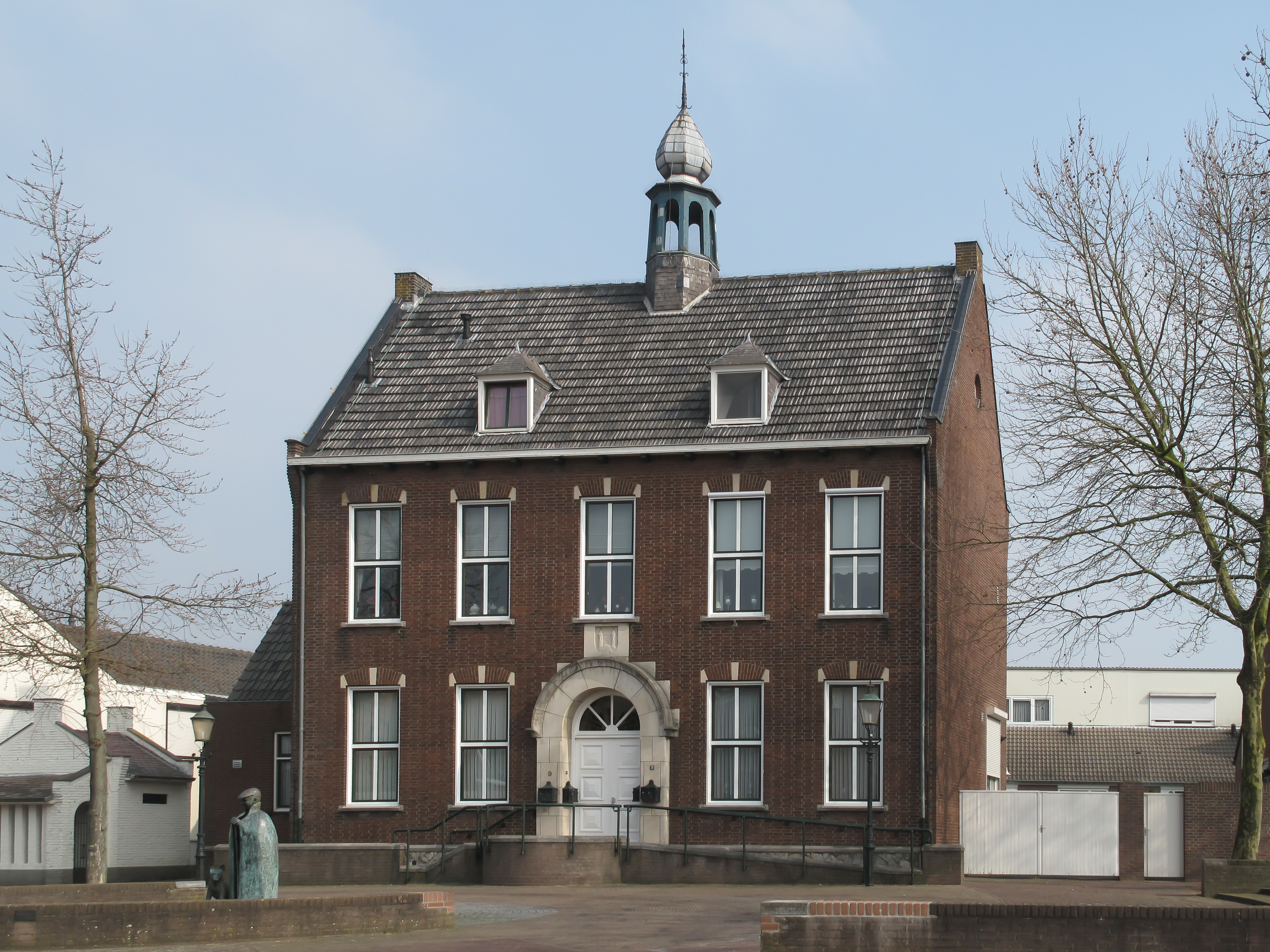
Montfort former townhall

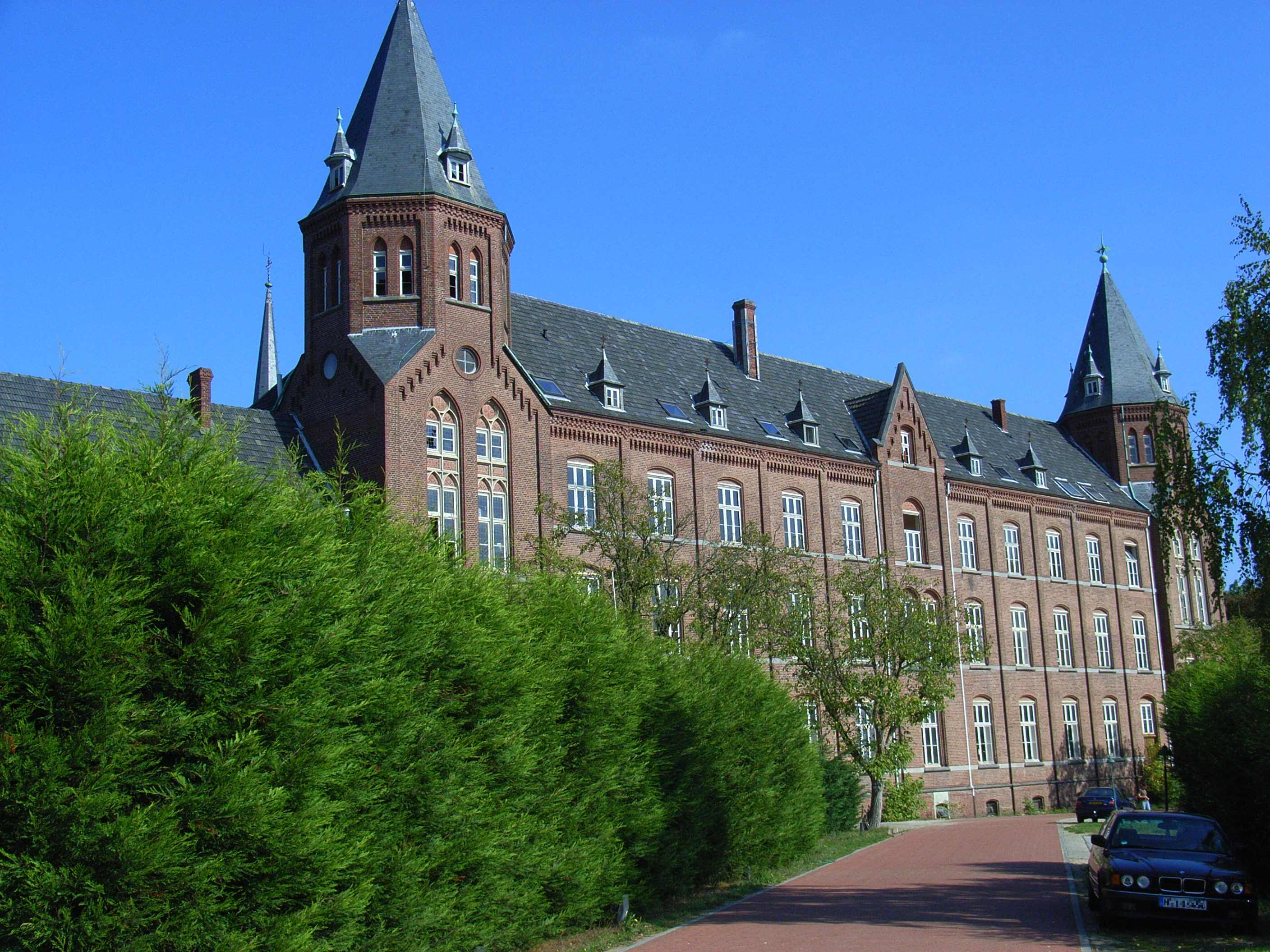
Vlodrop

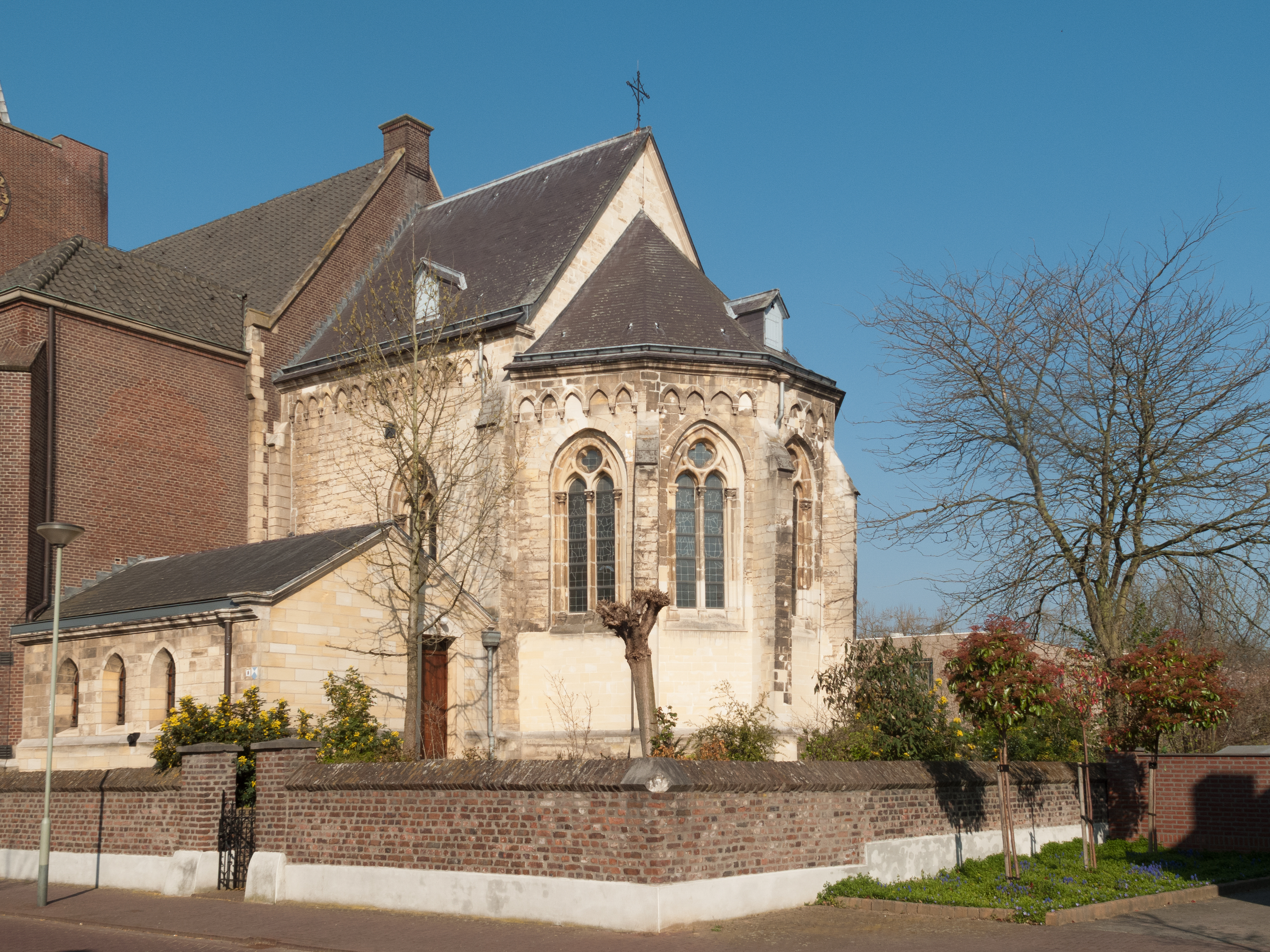
Church (de Sint Sebastianuskerk) in Herkenbosch
