= Hubert Biermans =

Dutch businessman

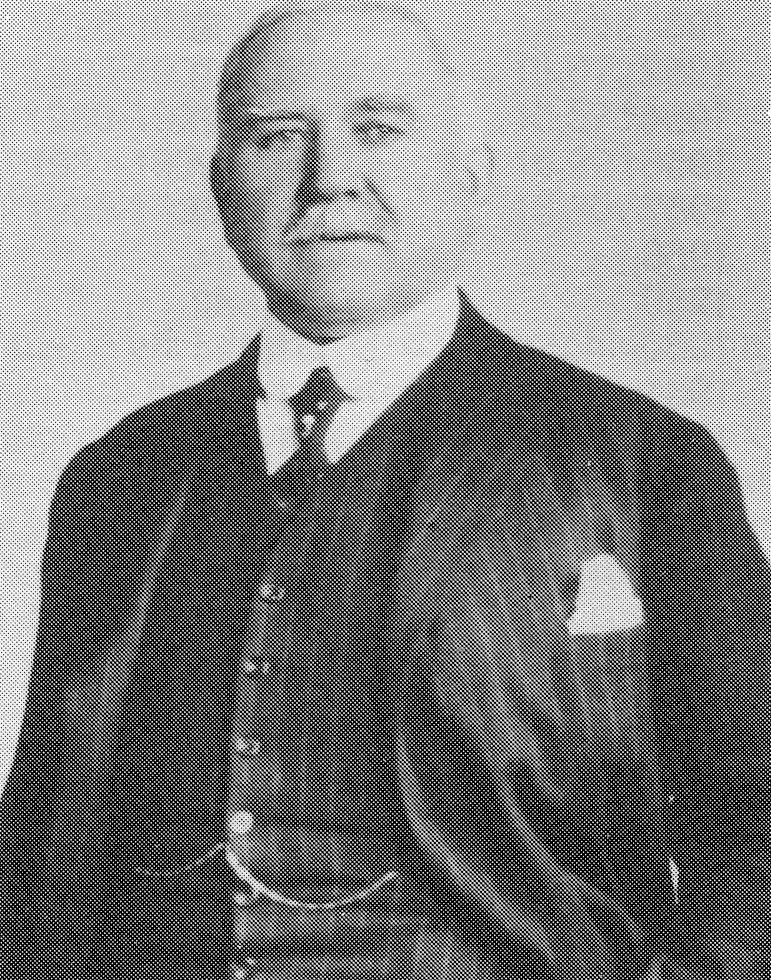
Hubert Biermans

Johannes Hubertus "Hubert" Biermans (31 December 1864, Herkenbosch - 12 February 1953, Monaco) was a Dutch and Canadian businessman.

== Biography ==
=== Youth ===
Jean Hubert Biermans was the son of Frans Biermans and Maria Joanna Hubertina Ruyten. His father was a baker in Herkenbosch, a village in the province of Limburg, in the Netherlands. In 1877, at the age of 12, Hubert began working for a Belgian railroad construction company. From then until 1888, he worked at various railroad construction sites in Belgium, Luxembourg, Italy, France and, from 1886 to 1888, in Algeria, where he was given the direction of the works.

=== Congo ===
In 1889, in Brussels, he entered at the service of the Compagnie de chemin de fer du Congo, of Belgian businessman Albert Thys. From 1890 to 1898, in Congo, Biermans worked on the construction of the Matadi-Léopoldville Railway, linking the port of Matadi to the Stanley Pool and to Léopoldville. At first, he was chief of an advanced survey team. He was later promoted to director of the superstructure team.

Back in Belgium, he was commissioned by the Banque d'Outremer for exploring railroad projects in different countries, from 1898 to 1900.

=== Canada ===
On November 9, 1900, Biermans arrived in Shawinigan, Quebec, Canada, to evaluate the advancement of the construction of a pulp and paper plant. He became director of the Belgian-owned Belgo Canadian Pulp & Paper Company ("the Belgo"). On December 12, 1907, he married Berthe Lapôtre, in Middelkerke, Belgium. He obtained Canadian citizenship. He ran for the Legislative Assembly of Quebec in the 1919 Quebec general election as an "independent liberal" candidate, in the district of Saint-Maurice, but was defeated by the official Liberal incumbent. That was his only attempt at politics. He retired as director of the Belgo in 1926.

=== Europe ===
Having accumulated a considerable fortune, Biermans settled in Europe, living in his houses in Paris, Monaco, Salneuve and Brussels, and managing his investments in many companies. Leaving Europe at the beginning of the Second World War, he lived near Montréal during the War, after which he returned to Europe. He made donations to several institutions and left instructions for his fiduciaries that the rest of his fortune be donated after his death. He died in 1953.

== Honours ==
His donations brought him many honours. He was made Commander of the Légion d'honneur (France), Commander of the Order of the Crown (Belgium), Grand Officer of the Order of Leopold (Belgium), Grand Officer of the Order of Leopold II (Belgium), Commander of the Royal Order of the Lion (Congo), Grand Officer of the Order of the Oak Crown (Luxembourg). Streets are named after him in Shawinigan and in Herkenbosch. Buildings are named after him in Paris, Québec City, Herkenbosch and Montréal.
