= Wiro of Roermond =

Missionary, bishop and saint

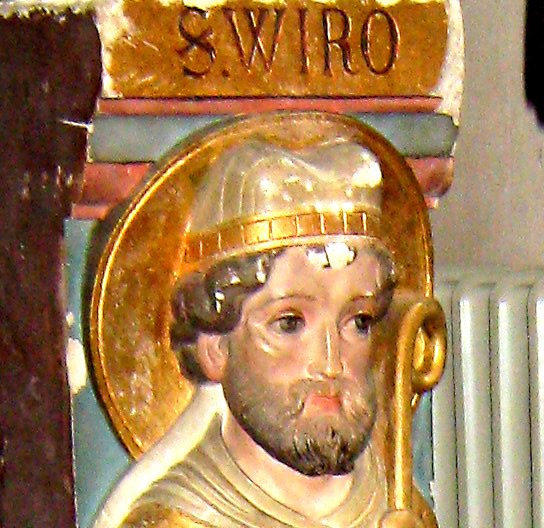
Saint Wiro: statue in Sint Odilienberg

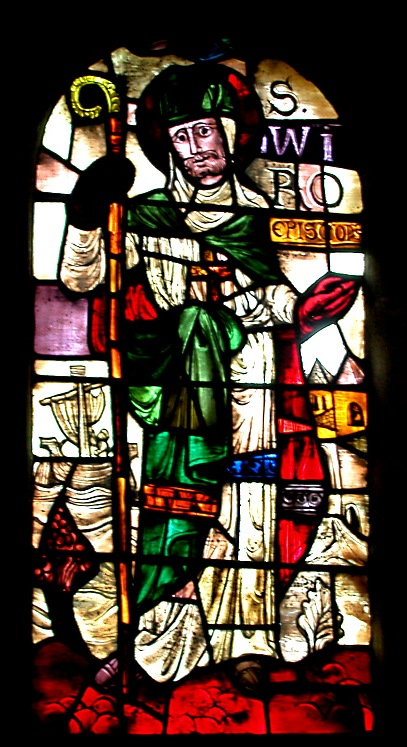
Wiro as a missionary bishop: stained glass window in the Basilica of Saints Wiro, Plechelm and Otger, Sint Odilienberg

Wiro of Roermond, also Wiro or Wera of Utrecht (and possibly also the same as Vira of Northumbria; d. c. 700) is a Christian saint of the 8th century. His feast day is May 8.

== Life ==
A native of Northumberland, Anglo-Saxon England, Wiro seems to have been associated with Saint Willibrord and to have been appointed the second bishop of Utrecht about 741.

Between 746 and 747, Wiro was one of eight bishops, along with St. Boniface, who wrote a letter to Æthelbald, King of Mercia, to reprove him for various dissolute and irreligious acts including stealing ecclesiastical revenue, violating church privileges, imposing forced labour on the clergy and fornicating with nuns. The letter implored Æthelbald to take a wife and abandon the sin of lust:

We therefore, beloved son, beseech Your Grace by Christ the son of God and by His coming and by His kingdom, that if it is true that you are continuing in this vice you will amend your life by penitence, purify yourself, and bear in mind how vile a thing it is through lust to change the image of God created in you into the image and likeness of a vicious demon. Remember that you were made king and ruler over many not by your own merits but by the abounding grace of God, and now you are making yourself by your own lust the slave of an evil spirit.

Wiro was an itinerant missionary and preached in the region of the Maas and the Rhine, where his legend associates him with the priest Plechelm and the deacon Otger.

Later, he founded St. Peter's Abbey on land given to him by Pippin II in the present Sint Odilienberg near Roermond in the Netherlands with Otger. Wiro is buried there.

He may be identical with the missionary bishop Vira from Northumbria, mentioned by Alcuin among others.

The Basilica of Saints Wiro, Plechelm and Otger at Sint Odilienberg is dedicated to Wiro and his companions.

== Veneration ==
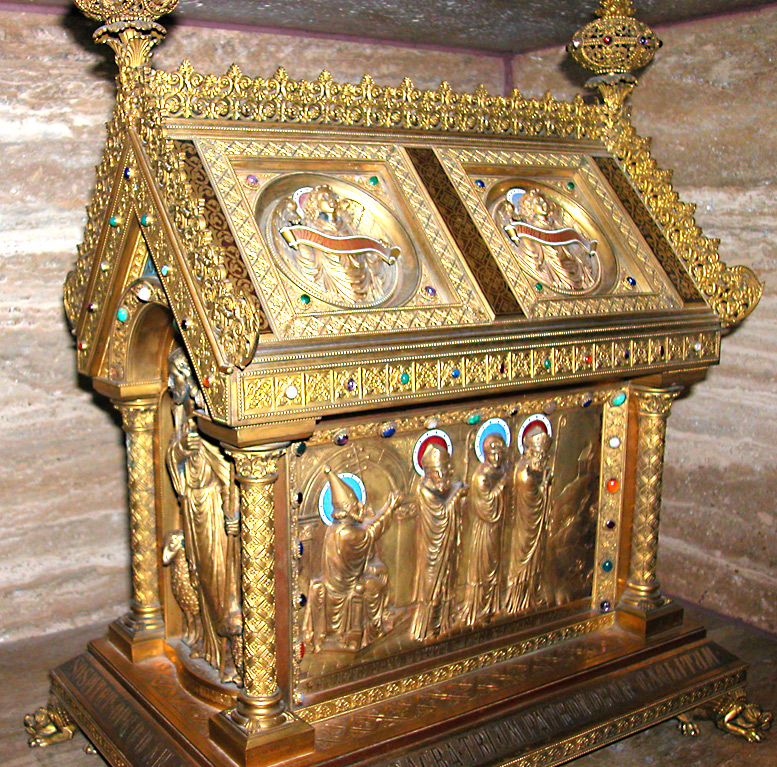
Reliquary shrine of Wiro, Plechelm and Otger in St. Odilienberg

Veneration of Wiro and his two companions began early in Roermond. The legendary life story was written at the end of the 10th century.

The monastery he founded was transferred to Roermond, in 1361, accompanied by his relics, which were lost during the Reformation. They were re-discovered later in the 16th century, and a feast day was celebrated for some years to commemorate the rediscovery. In 1881 the original grave was found in the former abbey, and most of the bones were returned to it.

Wiro's feast day is 8 May but in Roermond 11 May. Since the Middle Ages, his skull has been in Utrecht, where he was the patron saint of the bishopric. Pilgrimages are still made to his grave, in Roermond.

== Sources ==
- Butler's Lives of the Saints. Collegeville, 1996 p. 44
- Andreas Merkt (2004). "Utrecht, Wera von". In Bautz, Traugott (ed.). Biographisch-Bibliographisches Kirchenlexikon (BBKL) (in German). Vol. 23. Nordhausen: Bautz. cols. 1417–1418. ISBN 3-88309-155-3.
- Fletcher, R. A. (1989). Who's who in Roman Britain and Anglo-Saxon England. London: Shepheard-Walwyn. ISBN 0-85683-089-5. OCLC 19064542.
