= Montfort, Netherlands =

Montfort
- Small city
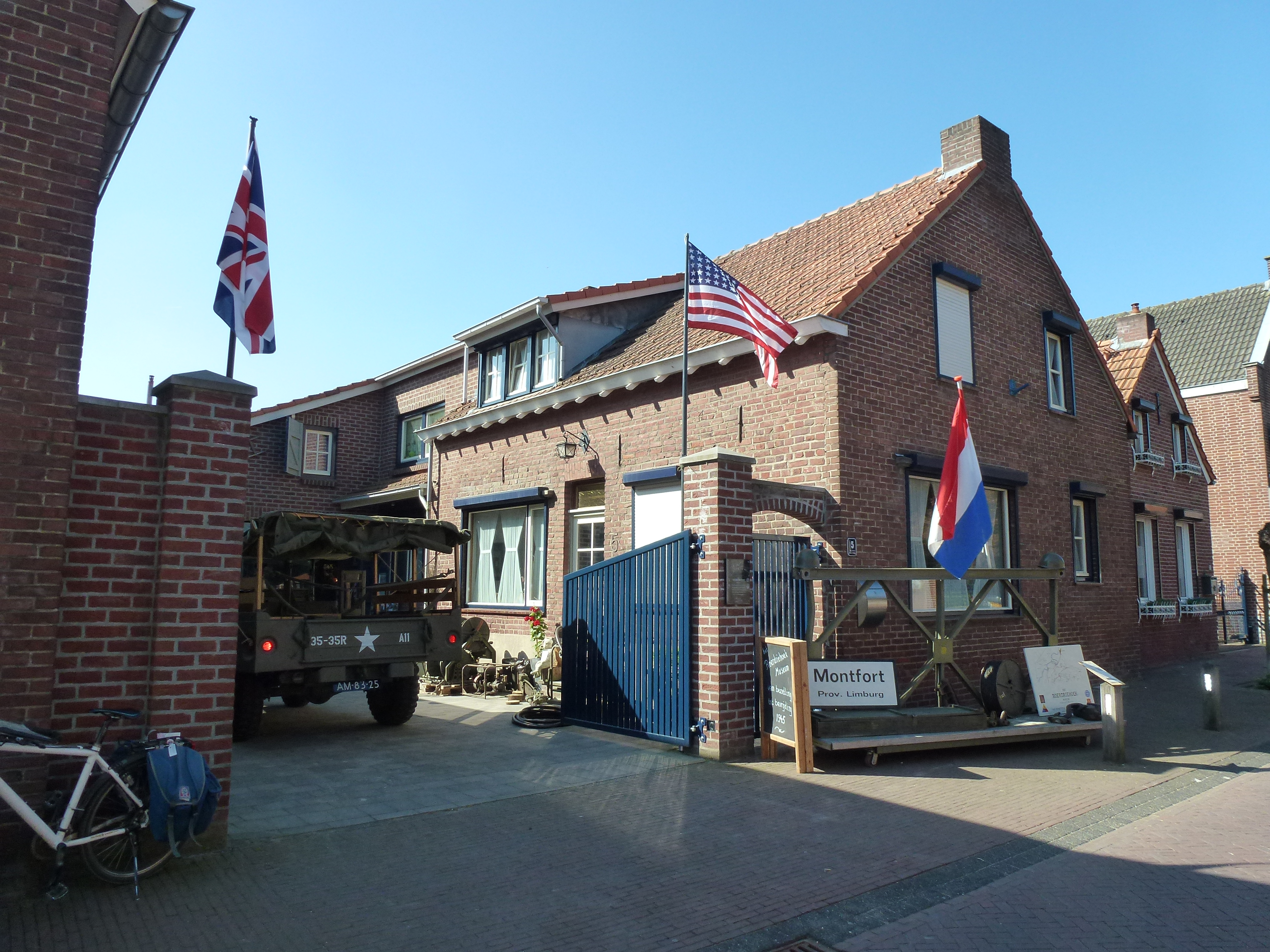
- Museum in Montfort

- Flag Coat of arms

- Location in the Netherlands Location in the province of Limburg in the Netherlands
- Coordinates: 51°07′45″N 5°56′45″E
- Country: Netherlands
- Province: Limburg
- Municipality: Roerdalen

Area
  - Total: 12.61 km^{2} (4.87 sq mi)
- Elevation: 27 m (89 ft)

Population (2021)
  - Total: 3,130
  - Density: 248/km^{2} (643/sq mi)
- Time zone: UTC+1 (CET)
  - Summer (DST): UTC+2 (CEST)
- Postal code: 6065
- Dialing code: 0475
- Major roads: A73

Montfort (Limburgish: Mofert) is a small city in the Dutch province of Limburg. Montfort has about 3,000 inhabitants. It lies about 8 km south of Roermond. It received city rights in 1271 and is renowned for the ruins of Castle Montfort, built in the 13th century.

Until 1991, Montfort was a separate municipality. It then became part of Posterholt, which was later renamed Ambt Montfort.

Since 1 January 2007, Montfort has been part of the municipality of Roerdalen.

== Places of interest ==
- The ruin of Castle Montfort. This castle was built around 1260 by Hendrik III of Gelre. For centuries it was the governmental centre of Ambt Montfort.
- The presbytery of Montfort is also one of Montfort's historic buildings.
- The mass graves and monuments on the cemetery. Most of the victims of the bombardments of Montfort at the end of the Second World War are buried here. The number of victims was high because at the time Montfort was a regional refugee sanctuary with 6 times its current population.
- The historical centre of Montfort. Most of the buildings in this part of the town are from the late 1950s because most of the original buildings were destroyed during the Second World War.
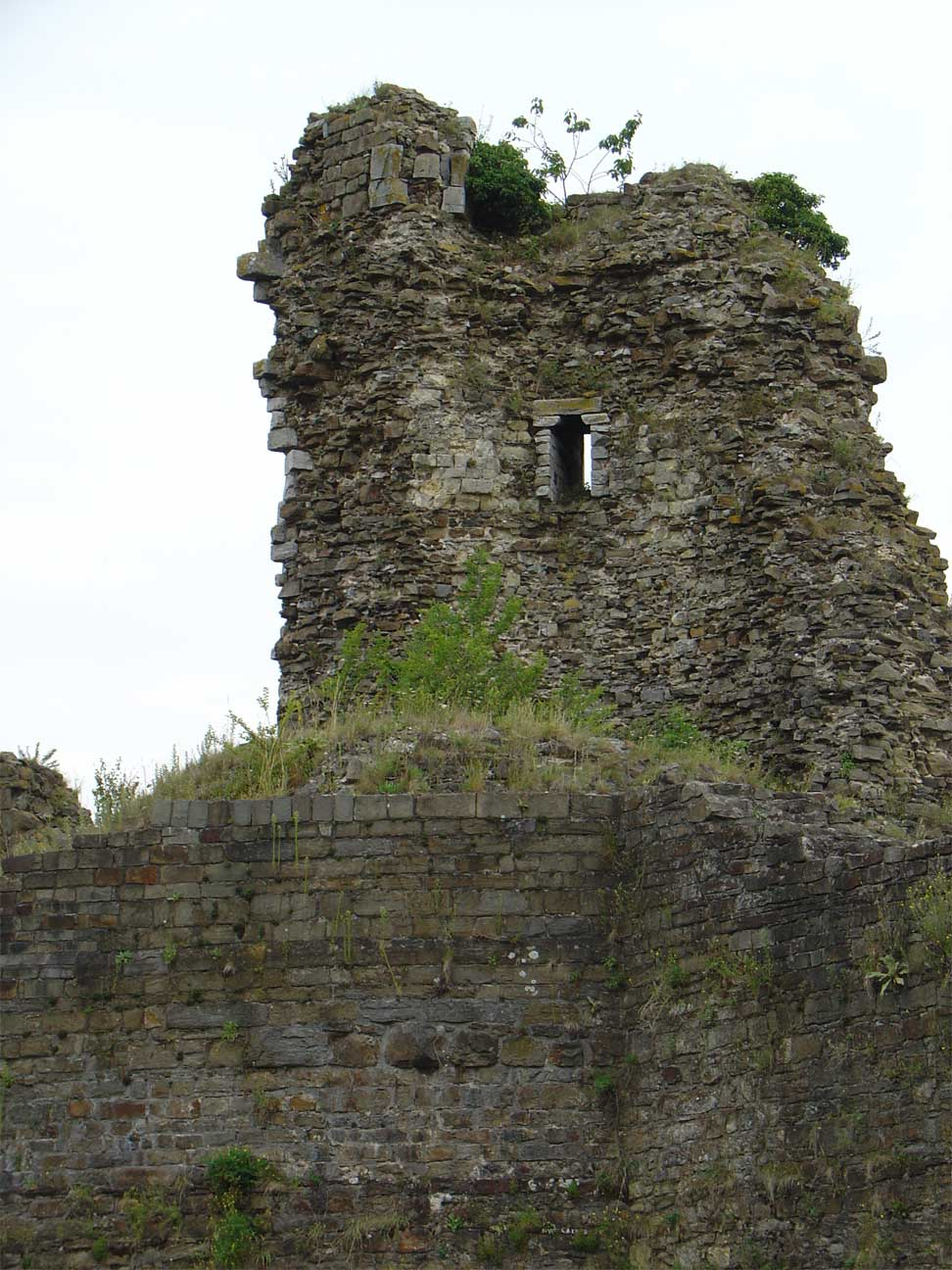
The ruin of Castle Montfort

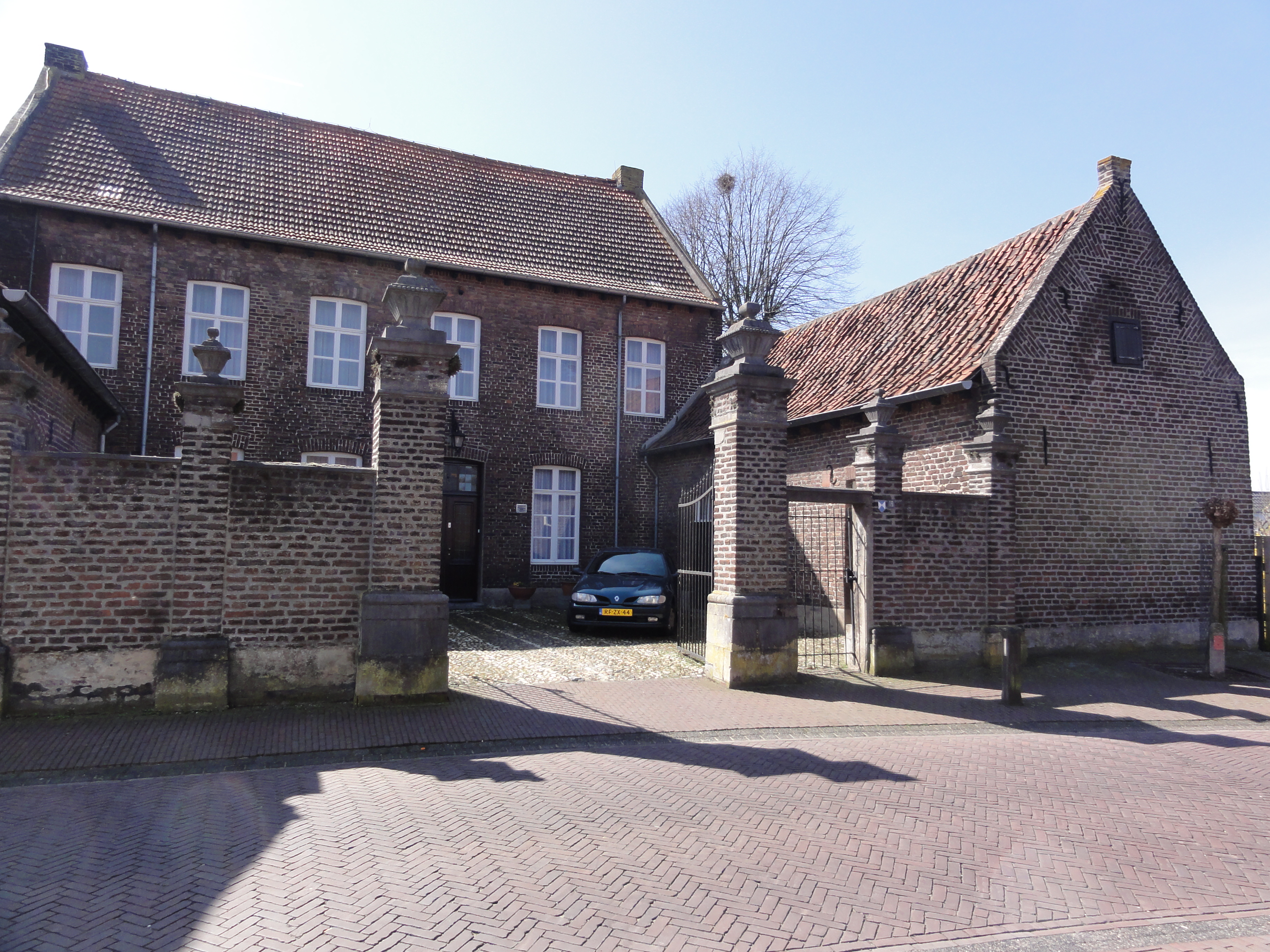
presbytery of Montfort

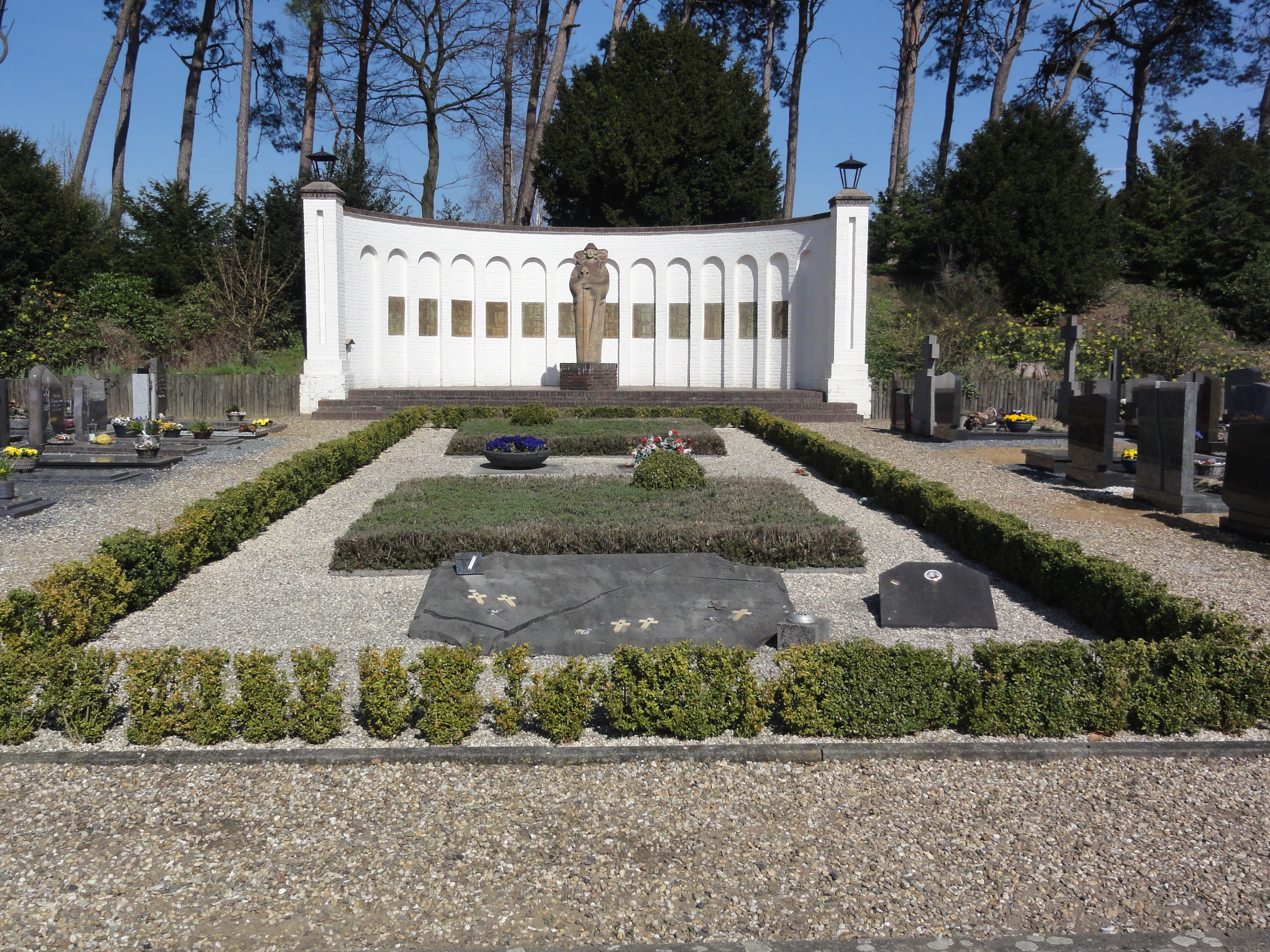
The monuments on the cemetery in Montfort

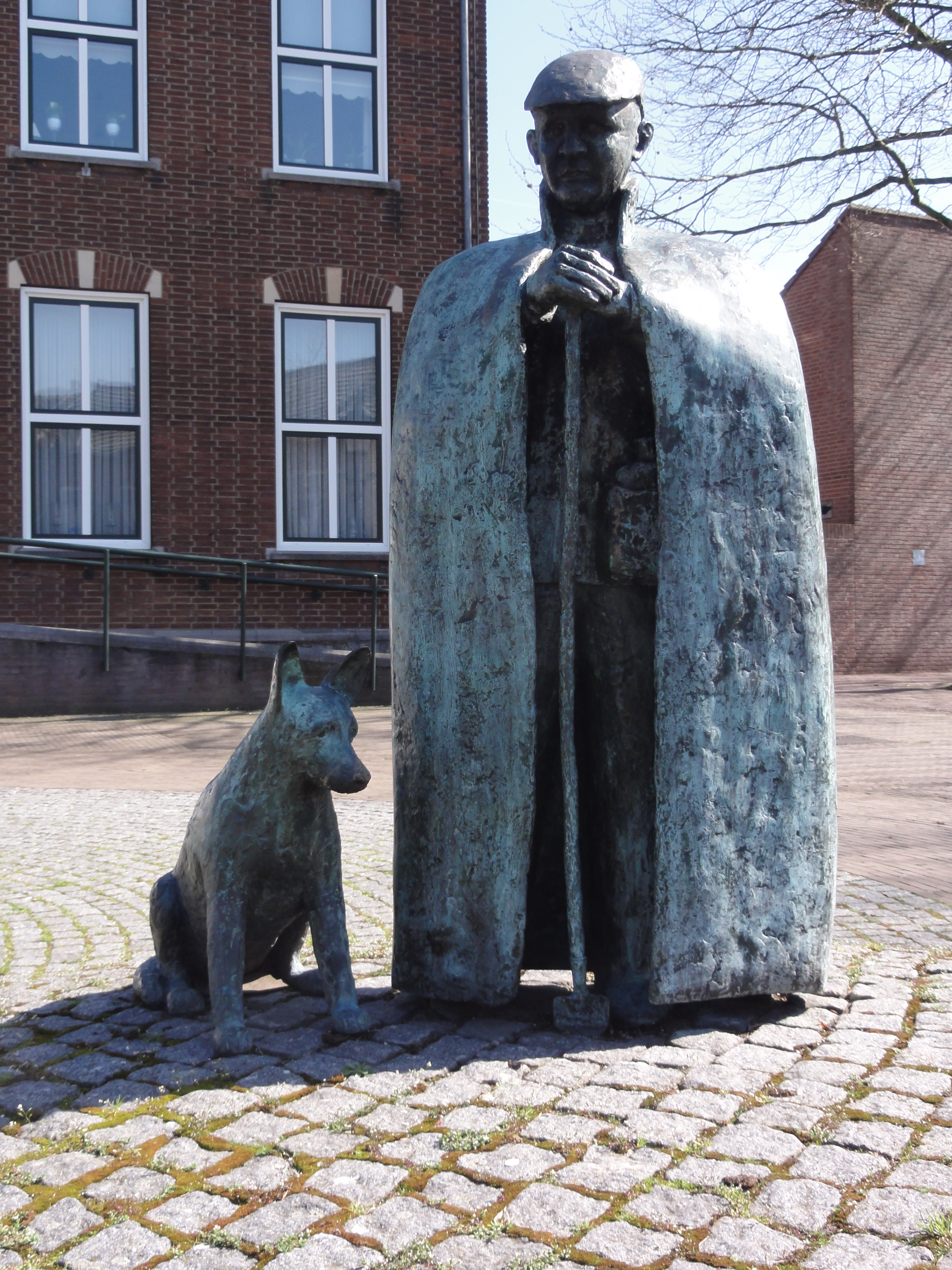
Sculpture of "Sjieëper" (Shepherd), by Henk Sillen

== Landscape ==
- Montfort is surrounded by forests, such as 't Sweeltje, Munichsbosch, Roozendaal and Reigershorst.

== Notable people ==
- Jos Verstappen (born 1972), Formula One and Rally driver, father of 4 time Formula One World Champion Max Verstappen
