= Reutje =

- Hamlet
- Location in the Netherlands Location in the province of Limburg in the Netherlands
- Coordinates: 51°07′45″N 6°00′29″E
- Country: Netherlands
- Province: Limburg (Netherlands)
- Municipality: Roerdalen

Area
  - Total: 0.11 km^{2} (0.042 sq mi)
- Elevation: 25 m (82 ft)

Population (2021)
  - Total: 175
  - Density: 1,600/km^{2} (4,100/sq mi)
- Time zone: UTC+1 (CET)
  - Summer (DST): UTC+2 (CEST)
- Postal code: 6077
- Dialing code: 0475

Reutje or 't Reutje (Dutch: [(ət) ˈrøːtɕə]; Limburgish: 't Räötje [ət ˈʀœːtʃə]) is a hamlet in Dutch Limburg. It belongs to the municipality of Roerdalen. It lies a few km from Sint Odiliënberg.

It was first mentioned in 1251 as "curtis in Raetken", and means "cultivated forest". Reutje has place name signs. It was home to 184 people in 1840.

There is a small café 'Bie Tiel' and a big fanfare, Sint Wiro. Reutje also has its own song: Träötje mien Landj, composed by Wiel Janssen and Pièrre Bonné.
