= Geert Chatrou =

Dutch whistler

- Chatrou in 2005
- Born: 6 February 1969 (age 57); Sint Odiliënberg, Netherlands
- Occupation: whistler

Geert Chatrou (born 6 February 1969) is a professional whistler from the Netherlands.

== Early life ==
Chatrou was born in Sint Odiliënberg in 1969. He started whistling at the age of four inspired by his father who used to whistle around the house.

== Career ==
Chatrou won the International Whistler's Convention in 2004, 2005 and 2008 and was a judge at the IWC in 2010. He was also awarded male Entertainer of the year in 2006 and 2010. He whistled the music for movies "Idiots and Angels" and "Le petit Nicolas". He also plays the recorder and flute.

== Discography ==
- Chatroubadour (2005) with Ocobar
- Ornithology (2008)
- Strange Flute (2013) with Ocobar

== See also ==
- Puccalo

== Sources ==
- Chatrou's online biography
