= Melick en Herkenbosch =

Municipality in Limburg, Netherlands

Coordinates: 51.157923°N 6.040249°E

Melick en Herkenbosch is a former municipality in the Dutch province of Limburg. It covered the villages of Melick and Herkenbosch.

In 1991, the municipality merged with Vlodrop, and in 1993, it changed its name to Roerdalen.
