= Sint Odiliënberg =

- Village
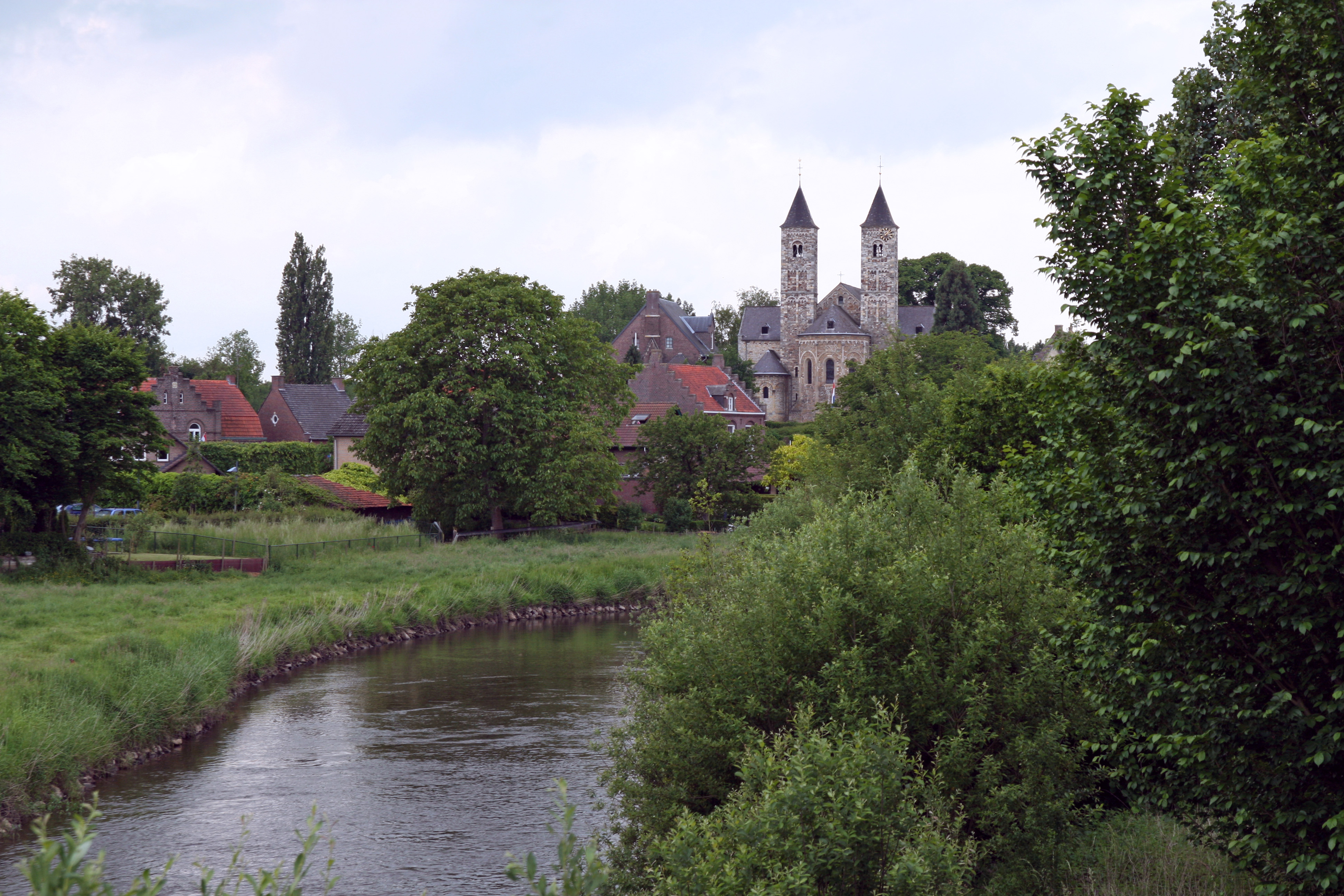
- Sint Odiliënberg on the Roer river

- Flag Coat of arms

- Location in the Netherlands Location in the province of Limburg in the Netherlands
- Coordinates: 51°08′35″N 6°00′10″E
- Country: Netherlands
- Province: Limburg
- Municipality: Roerdalen

Area
  - Total: 9.30 km^{2} (3.59 sq mi)
- Elevation: 25 m (82 ft)

Population (2021)
  - Total: 3,730
  - Density: 401/km^{2} (1,040/sq mi)
- Time zone: UTC+1 (CET)
  - Summer (DST): UTC+2 (CEST)
- Postal code: 6077
- Dialing code: 0475
- Major roads: N293

Sint Odiliënberg (Dutch pronunciation: [sɪnt oːˈdilijə(m)bɛr(ə)x]) is a village in southeast Netherlands, It is located in Roerdalen, Limburg, in the Roer River valley.

== History ==
Romans settled here very early. Around 700, missionary monks from Northumbria, Saints Wiro, Plechelmus, and Otgerus, built a monastery there, which was important in the Christianisation of the Netherlands. In the time of the Viking invasions the Utrecht clergy found shelter here. At first it was a secular collegiate chapter, which later moved to Roermond in the 14th century. A community of the Canons Regular of the Holy Sepulchre settled on the hill during that period.

The village was first mentioned in the first half of the 9th century as Mons Petri. The current name means "hill of Odile of Alsace".

After the Eighty Years' War, this area came under Spanish rule; it was ceded to the Dutch Republic in 1715. Until the French municipal reorganisation, St. Odiliënberg belonged to the administrative division known as Ambt Montfort. Around 1810 it became a separate commune/municipality. In 1991 the municipality of Sint Odiliënberg merged into Ambt Montfort, which in January 2007 merged into Roerdalen.

== Attractions ==
Standing on a hill is a Romanesque basilica with two towers dating from the eleventh century. Next to the basilica is a 10th-century chapel, originally the parish church.

== Gallery ==
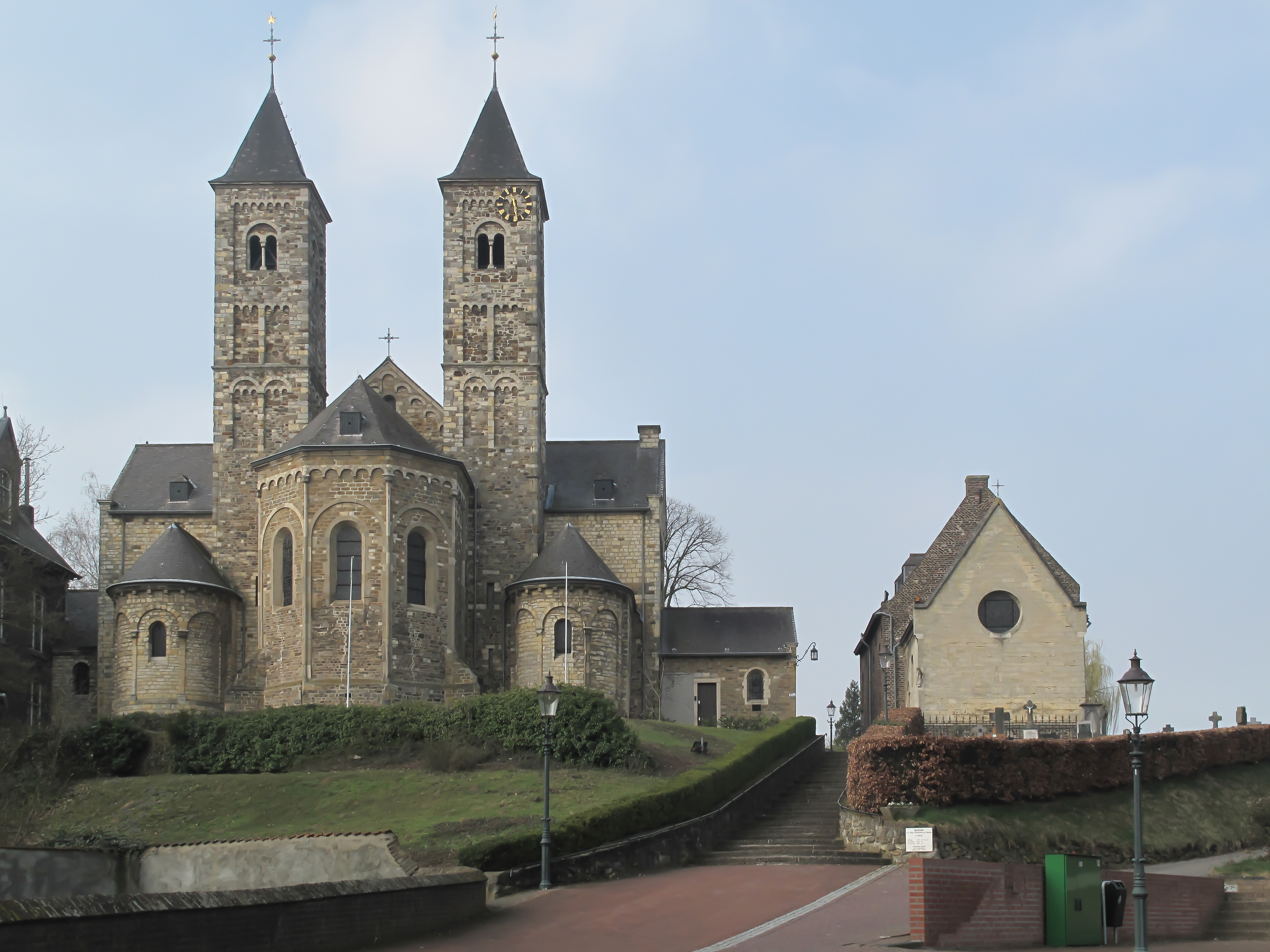
Sint Odiliënberg, basilica

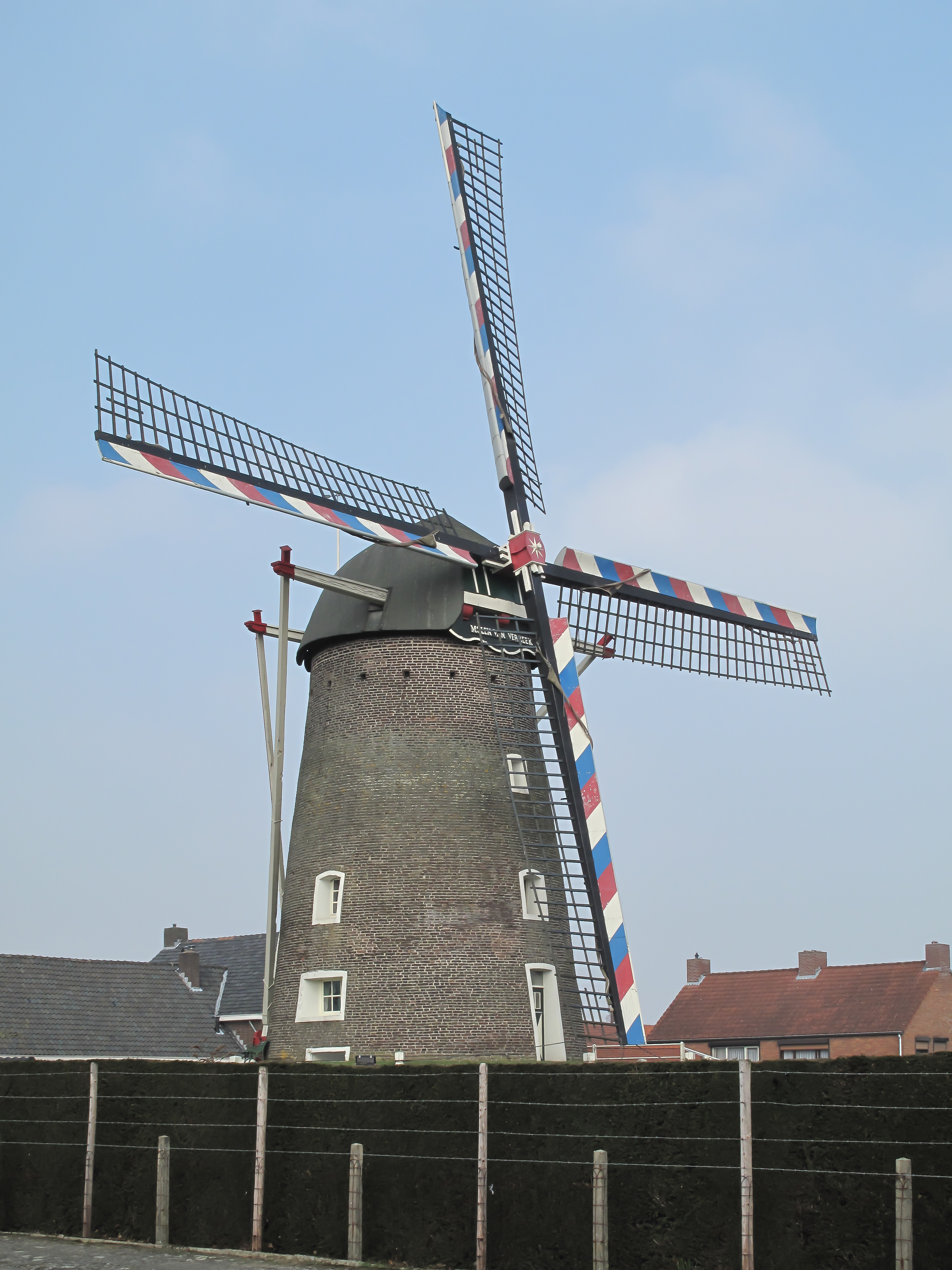
Sint Odiliënberg, windmill: molen van Verbeek

== Notable residents ==
- Connie Palmen, writer, born in St. Odiliënberg
- Geert Chatrou, professional whistler, born in St. Odiliënberg
