= Gulpen-Wittem =

Municipality in Limburg province, Netherlands

Gulpen-Wittem Gullepe-Wittem
- Municipality
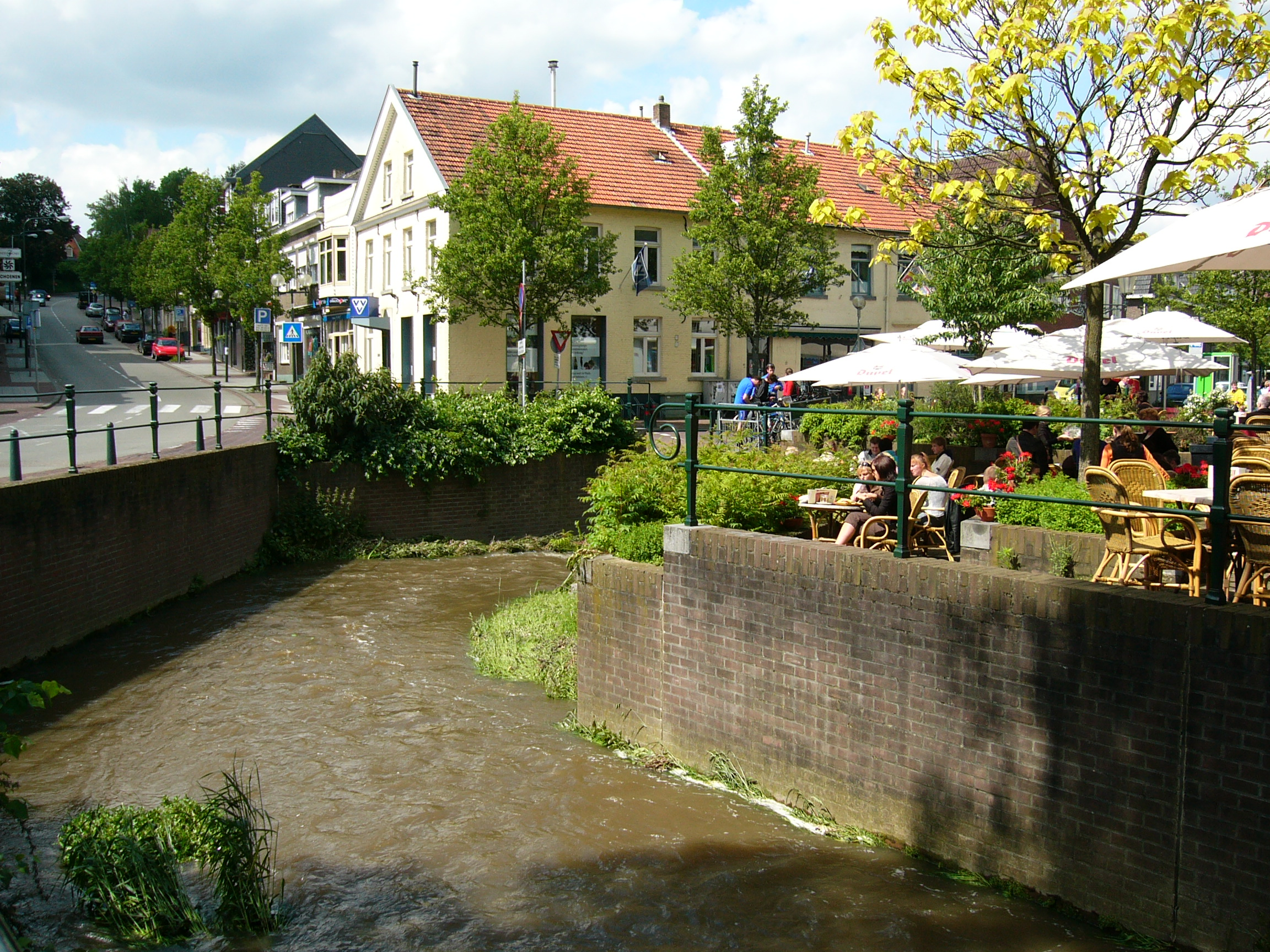
- The Gulp River through Gulpen

- Flag Coat of arms

- Location in Limburg
- Coordinates: 50°49′N 5°53′E
- Country: Netherlands
- Province: Limburg
- Established: 1 January 1999

Government
  - Body: Municipal council
  - Mayor: Nicole Ramaekers-Rutjens

Area
  - Total: 73.36 km^{2} (28.32 sq mi)
  - Land: 73.18 km^{2} (28.25 sq mi)
  - Water: 0.18 km^{2} (0.069 sq mi)
- Elevation: 95 m (312 ft)

Population (January 2021)
  - Total: 14,206
  - Density: 194/km^{2} (500/sq mi)
- Time zone: UTC+1 (CET)
  - Summer (DST): UTC+2 (CEST)
- Postcode: 6270–6289, 6320–6321
- Area code: 043
- Website: www.gulpen-wittem.nl

Gulpen-Wittem (Dutch: [ˈɣʏlpə(ɱ) ˈʋɪtəm]; Limburgish: Gullepe-Wittem [ˈɣʏləpə ˈwɪtəm]) is a municipality in the southeastern Netherlands (in the province of Limburg) with 14,206 inhabitants as of 2021.

Gulpen-Wittem came into being after the merger of the municipalities Gulpen and Wittem. This took place at the request by both municipalities. At the time of the merger, both municipalities had about 8000 inhabitants, although Wittem was slightly larger. The town hall in Gulpen has kept its function in the new municipality. The former town hall of Wittem was situated in a manor house in Mechelen since 1986, which is now being used as a "nursing hostel".

The municipality is rural, with many castles, half-timbered houses and old monumental farms. The area attracts many tourists from across the country, especially during the summer, due to its relatively sloping landscape.

== Population centres ==
- Beertsenhoven
- Berghem
- Berghof
- Beutenaken
- Billinghuizen
- Bissen
- Bommerig
- Broek
- Cartils
- Crapoel
- Dal
- De Hut
- Diependal
- Dijk
- Elkenrade
- Elzet
- Epen
- Eperheide
- Etenaken
- Euverem
- Eys
- Eyserheide
- Gracht
- Gulpen
- Heijenrath
- Helle
- Hilleshagen
- Höfke
- Hurpesch
- Ingber
- Kapolder
- Kleeberg
- Kosberg
- Kuttingen
- Landsrade
- Mechelen
- Mingersberg
- Nijswiller
- Overeys
- Overgeul
- Partij
- Pesaken
- Piepert
- Plaat
- Reijmerstok
- Schilberg
- Schweiberg
- Sinselbeek
- Slenaken
- Stokhem
- Terlinden
- Terpoorten
- Terziet
- Trintelen
- Wahlwiller
- Waterop
- Wijlre
- Wittem

=== Topography ===
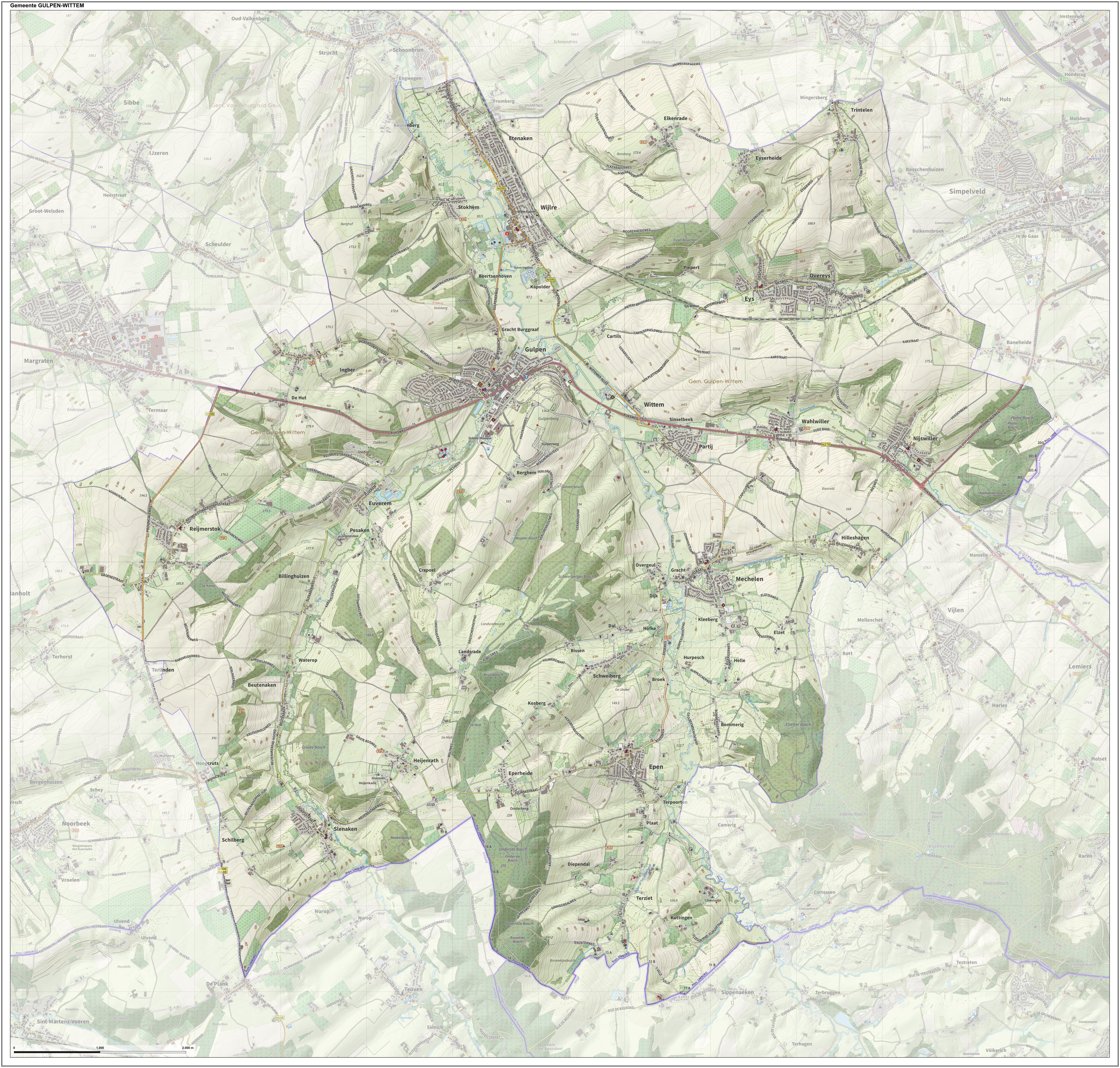

Map of the municipality of Gulpen-Wittem, June 2015

== Economy ==
Apart from beer brewing ("Gulpener" (at Gulpen) and "Brand" (at Wijlre)), vinegar production ("Gulpener") and agriculture, tourism is essential aspect of economical activity in this municipality. Especially Slenaken is a distinct tourist site.

== Notable people ==
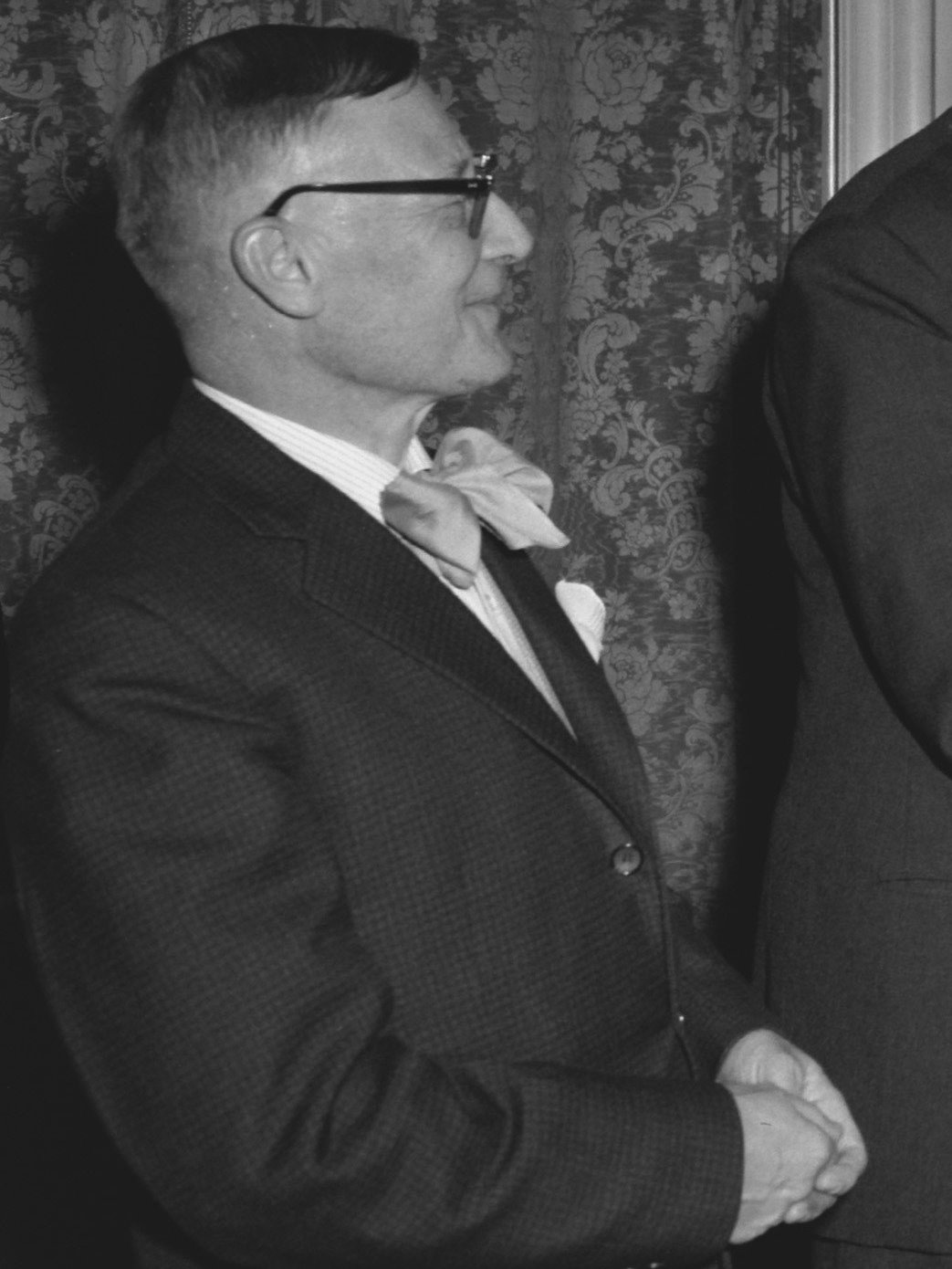
Antoon Coolen, 1959

- Jan Gerard Kemmerling (1776 in Gulpen – 1818) Mayor of Heerlen and Nieuwenhagen
- Adolphe Engers (1884 in Gulpen – 1945) a writer and stage and film actor
- Martinus Cobbenhagen (1893 in Gulpen – 1954) a Roman Catholic priest, economist and academic
- Antoon Coolen (1897 in Wijlre – 1961) a writer of novels
- René van der Linden (born 1943 in Eys) a retired politician, diplomat and economist
- Sjef Hensgens (1948 in Wijlre – 2024) a middle-distance runner, competed at the 1972 Summer Olympics
- Henk Savelberg (born 1953 in Mechelen) a head chef
- Ralf Vandebergh (born 1976 in Nijswiller) an astronomer and professional photographer

== Gallery ==
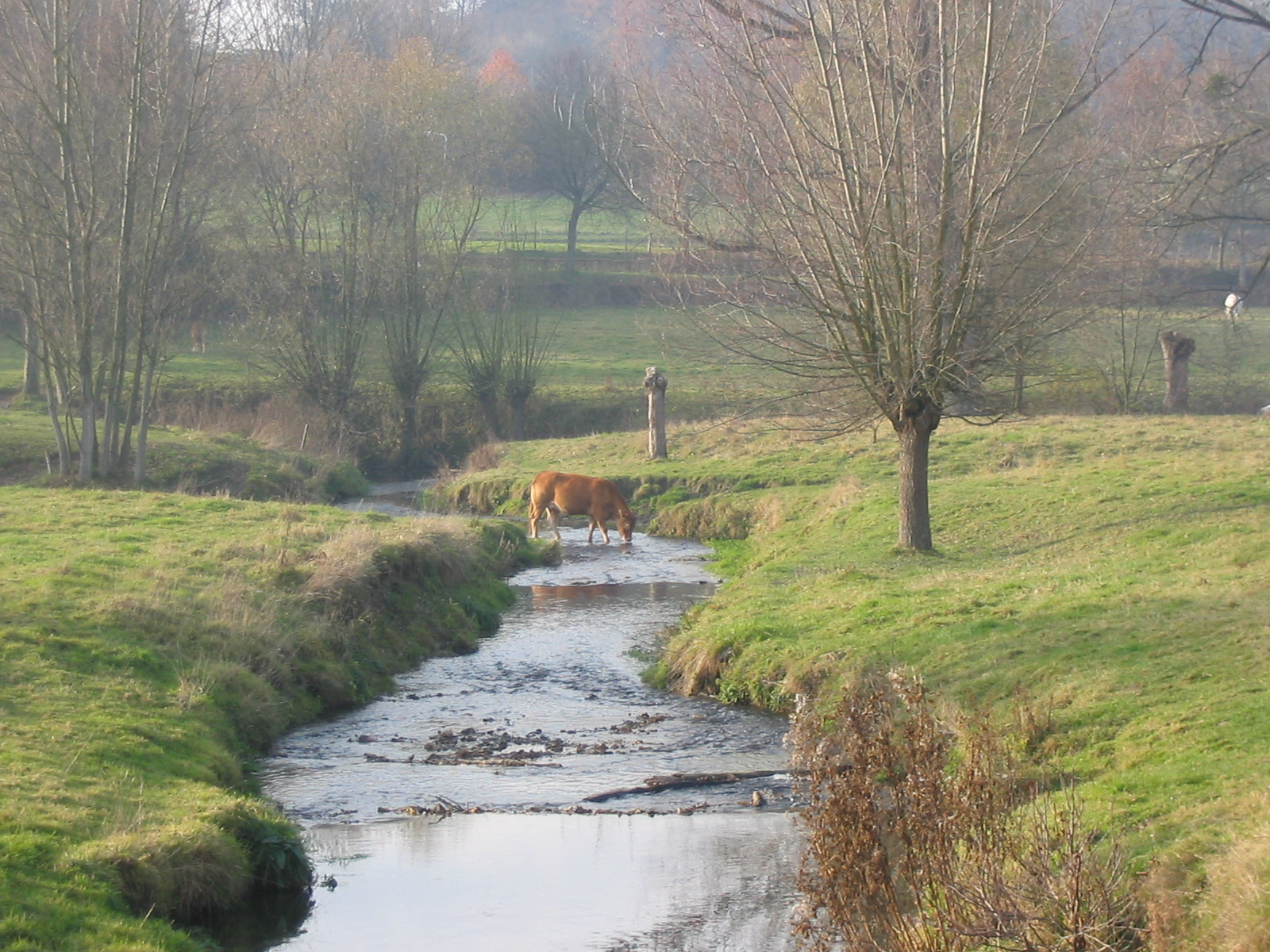
The river Gulp near Slenaken

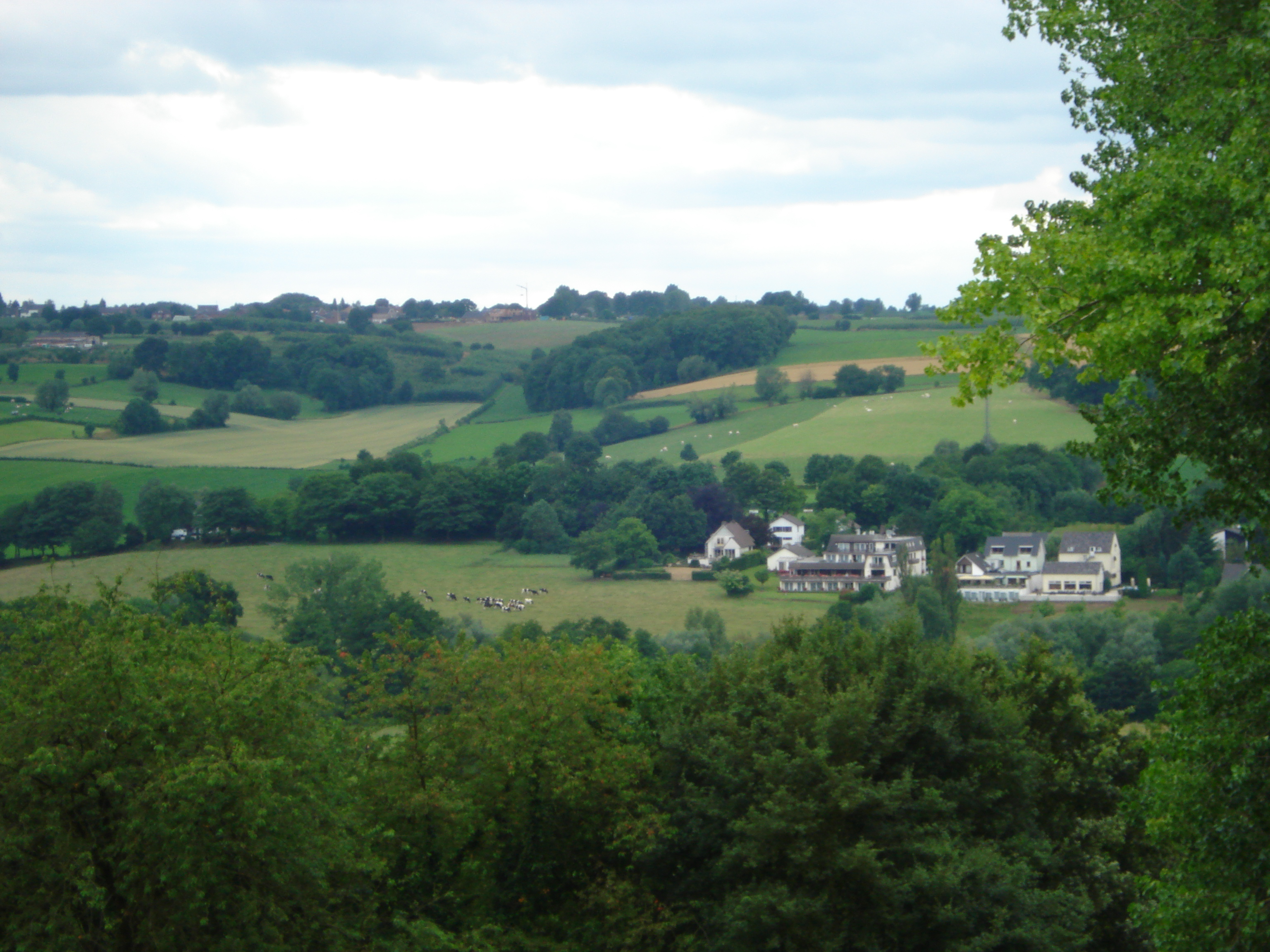
Hilly landscape near Slenaken

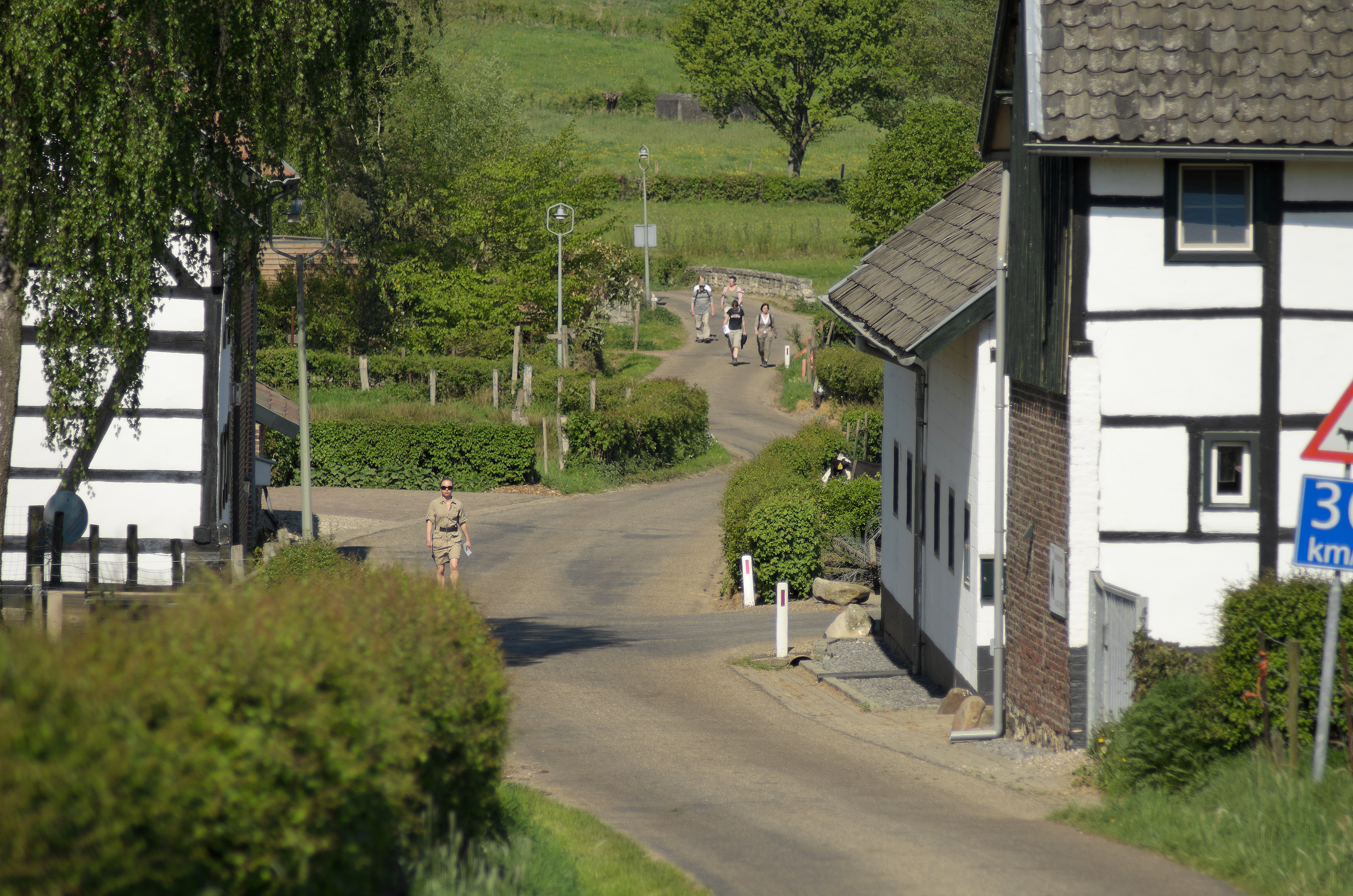
Countryside panorama

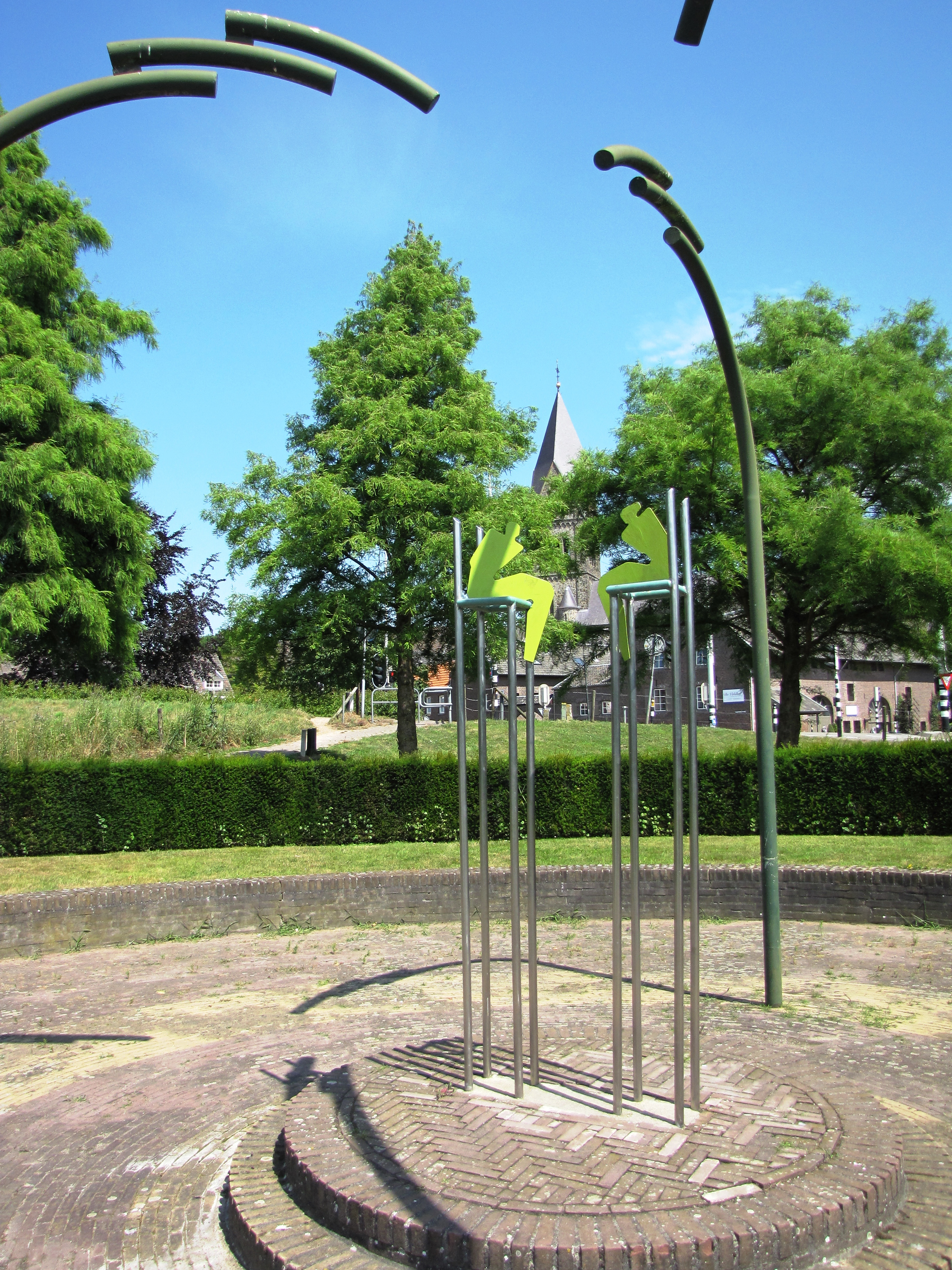
Kunstroute Gulpen

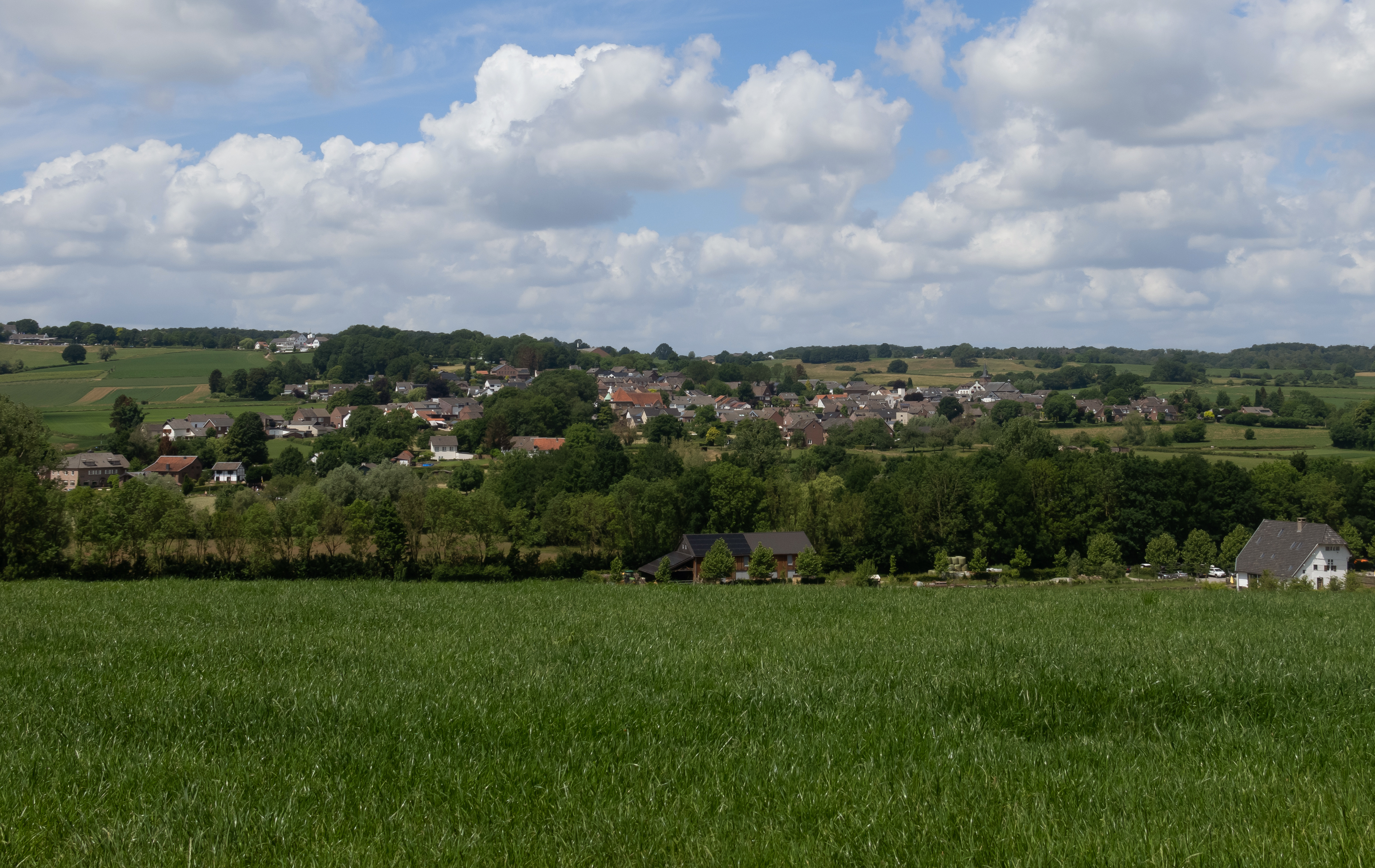
Epen, panorama of the village from Camerig
