= Reijmerstok =

Reijmerstok Rimmesjtók
- Village
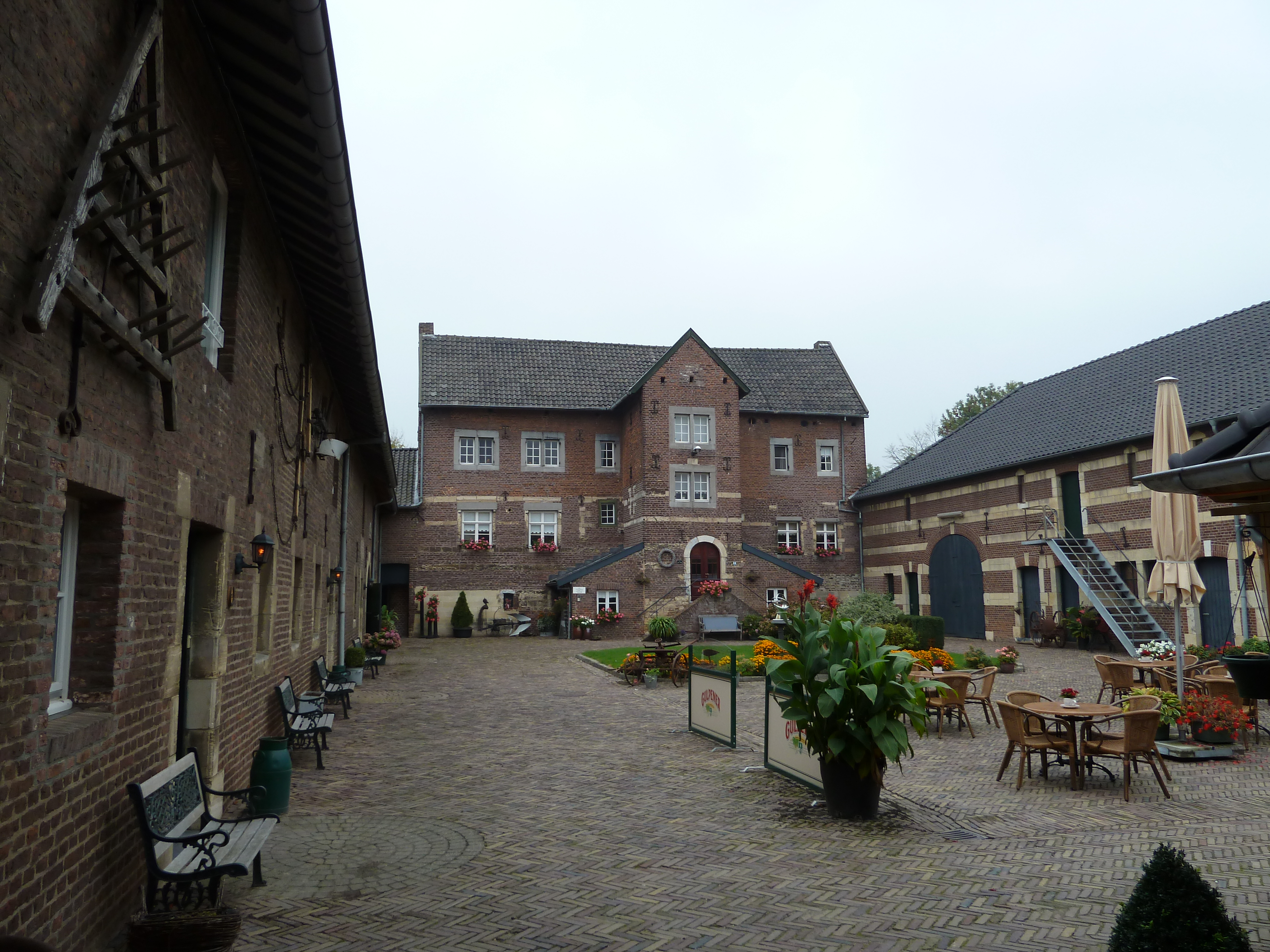

- Location in the Netherlands Location in the province of Limburg in the Netherlands
- Coordinates: 50°47′57″N 5°50′11″E
- Country: Netherlands
- Province: Limburg
- Municipality: Gulpen-Wittem

Area
  - Total: 1.85 km^{2} (0.71 sq mi)
- Elevation: 177 m (581 ft)

Population (2021)
  - Total: 525
  - Density: 284/km^{2} (735/sq mi)
- Time zone: UTC+1 (CET)
  - Summer (DST): UTC+2 (CEST)
- Postal code: 6274
- Dialing code: 043

Reijmerstok (Limburgish: Rimmesjtók) is a village in the municipality Gulpen-Wittem in the Dutch province of Limburg. It lies southwest of Gulpen and counts about 600 inhabitants. In the village several half timbered houses can be found. There also is a viaduct, which was part of the tramline between the Dutch city of Maastricht and the German city of Aachen that was in use from 1925 until 1938.

Near Reijmerstok hops are grown for the Gulpener Brewery.

== Gallery ==
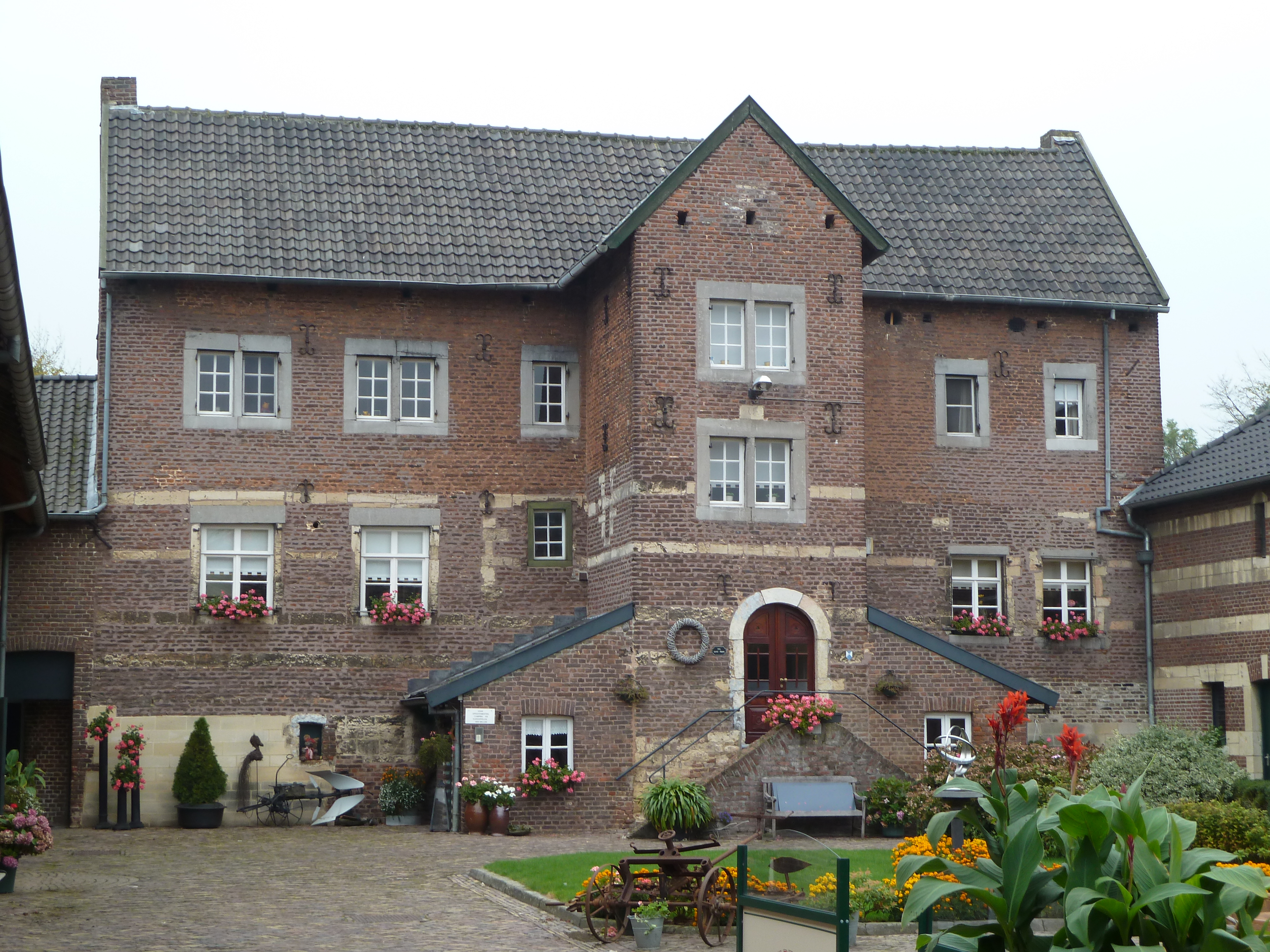
Puthof

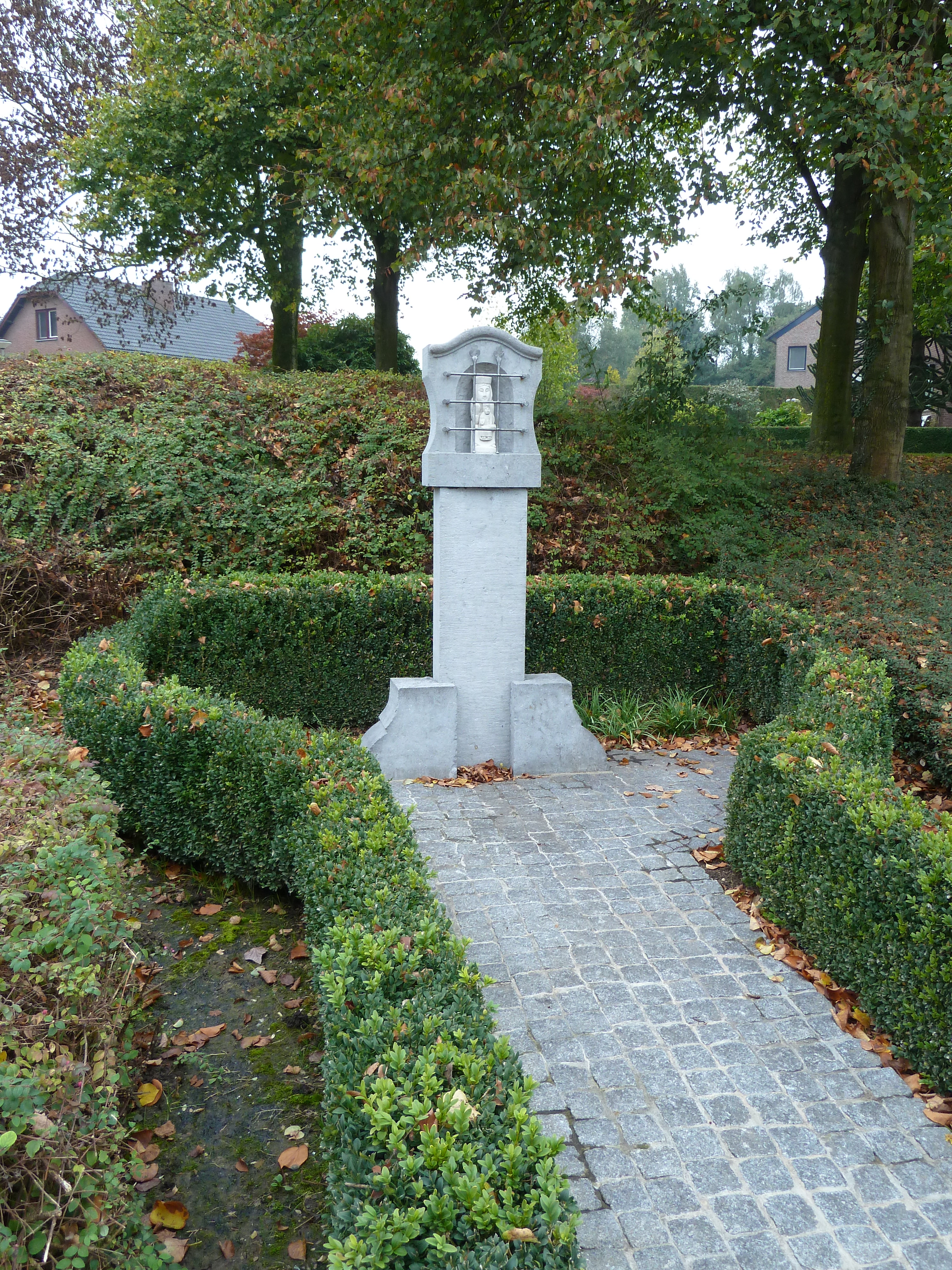
Cross at crossing of Putveld-Reijmerstokkerdorpsstraat
