= Beutenaken =

Beutenaken Böätenake
- Hamlet
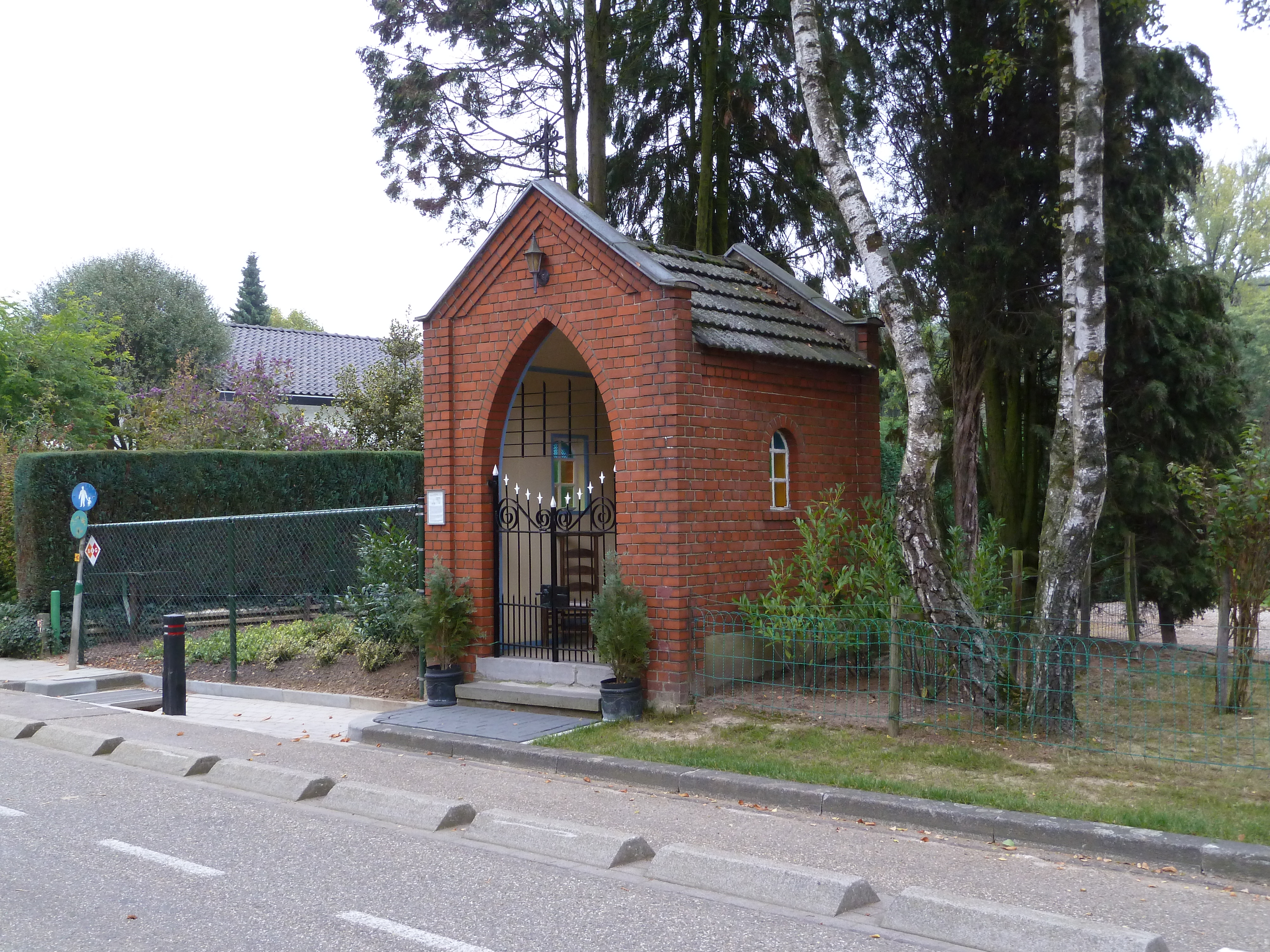
- Sacred Heart chapel

- Location in the Netherlands Location in the province of Limburg in the Netherlands
- Coordinates: 50°46′55″N 5°51′15″E
- Country: Netherlands
- Province: Limburg
- Municipality: Gulpen-Wittem

Area
  - Total: 1.55 km^{2} (0.60 sq mi)
- Elevation: 130 m (430 ft)

Population (2021)
  - Total: 45
  - Density: 29/km^{2} (75/sq mi)
- Time zone: UTC+1 (CET)
  - Summer (DST): UTC+2 (CEST)
- Postal code: 6278
- Dialing code: 043

Beutenaken (Limburgish: Böätenake) is a hamlet in the southeastern Netherlands. It is part of the village of Slenaken in the municipality of Gulpen-Wittem, Limburg, about 20 km east of Maastricht. Older names for the village are Bottinachs, Butenacho and Butenachen.

The village is built as a linear settlement in the valley of the Gulp river, on a road connecting Waterop with Slenaken. The village has a chapel dedicated to Maria dating from 1880 and a chapel dedicated to the Sacred heart dating from 1929. Also it has several timber framing buildings, including a farm located at Beutenaken 38, which dates from the 18th century and has been designated a national monument.

== Gallery ==
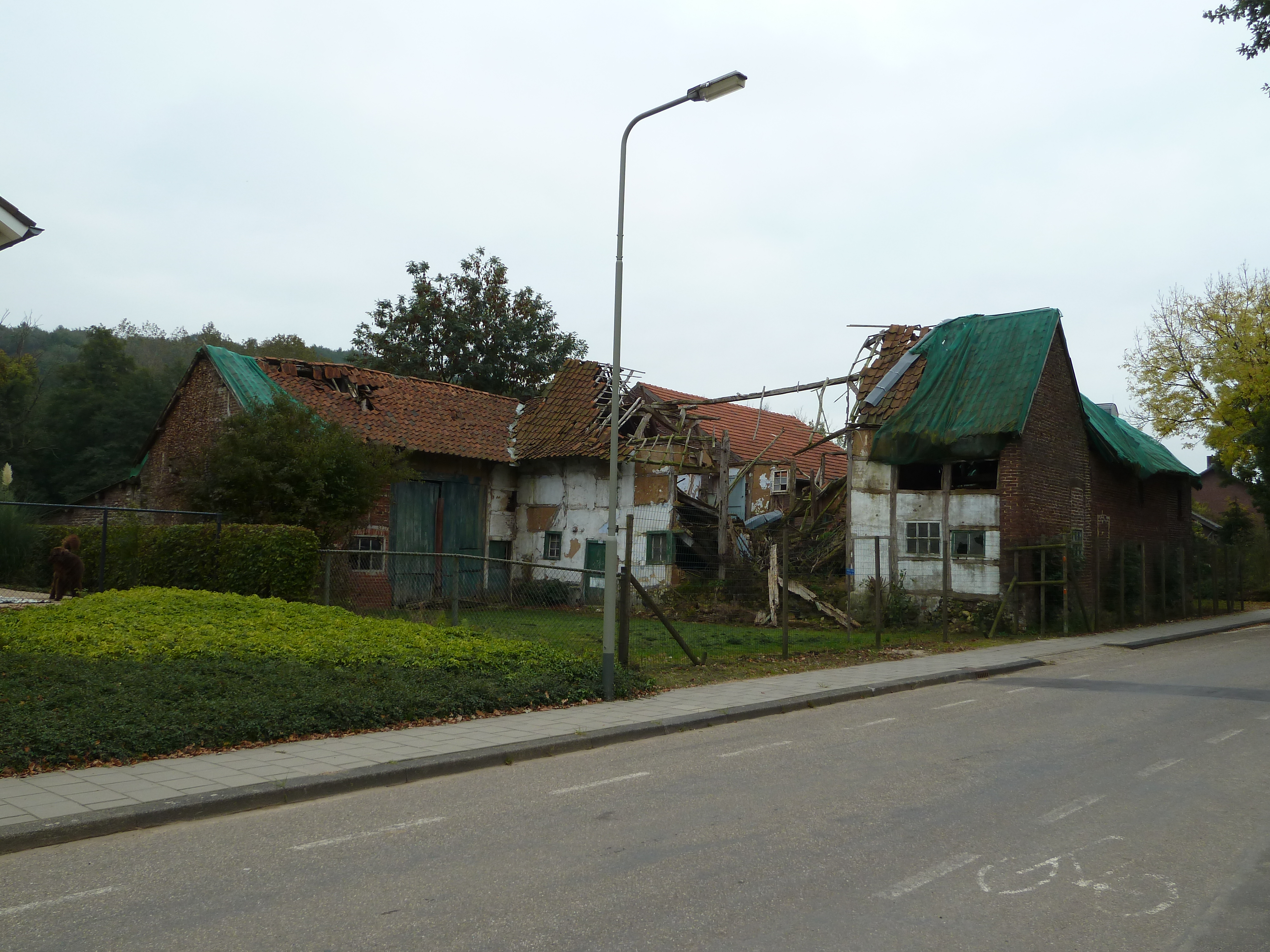
Beutenaken 38, monumental farm

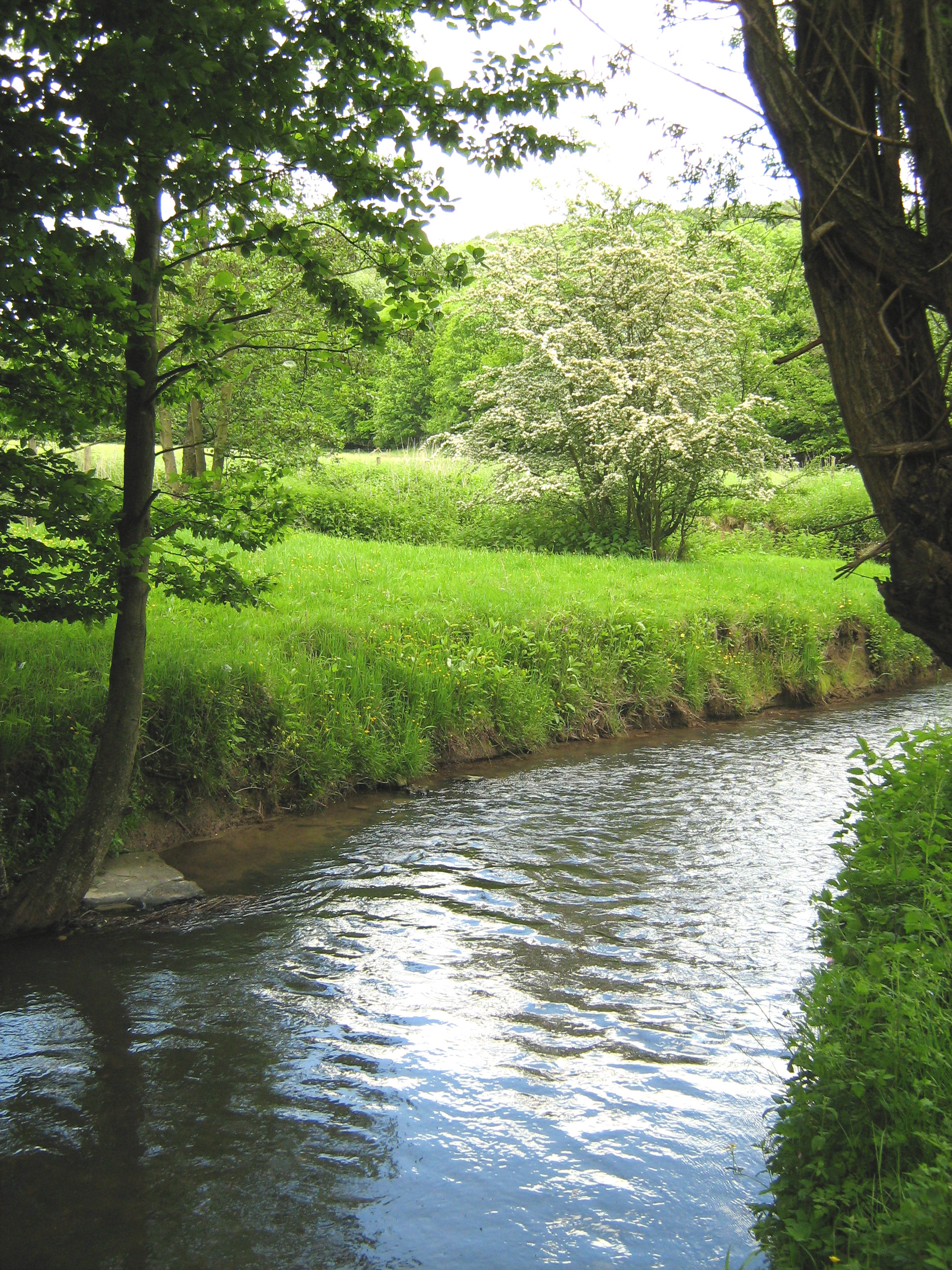
River Gulp in Beutenaken

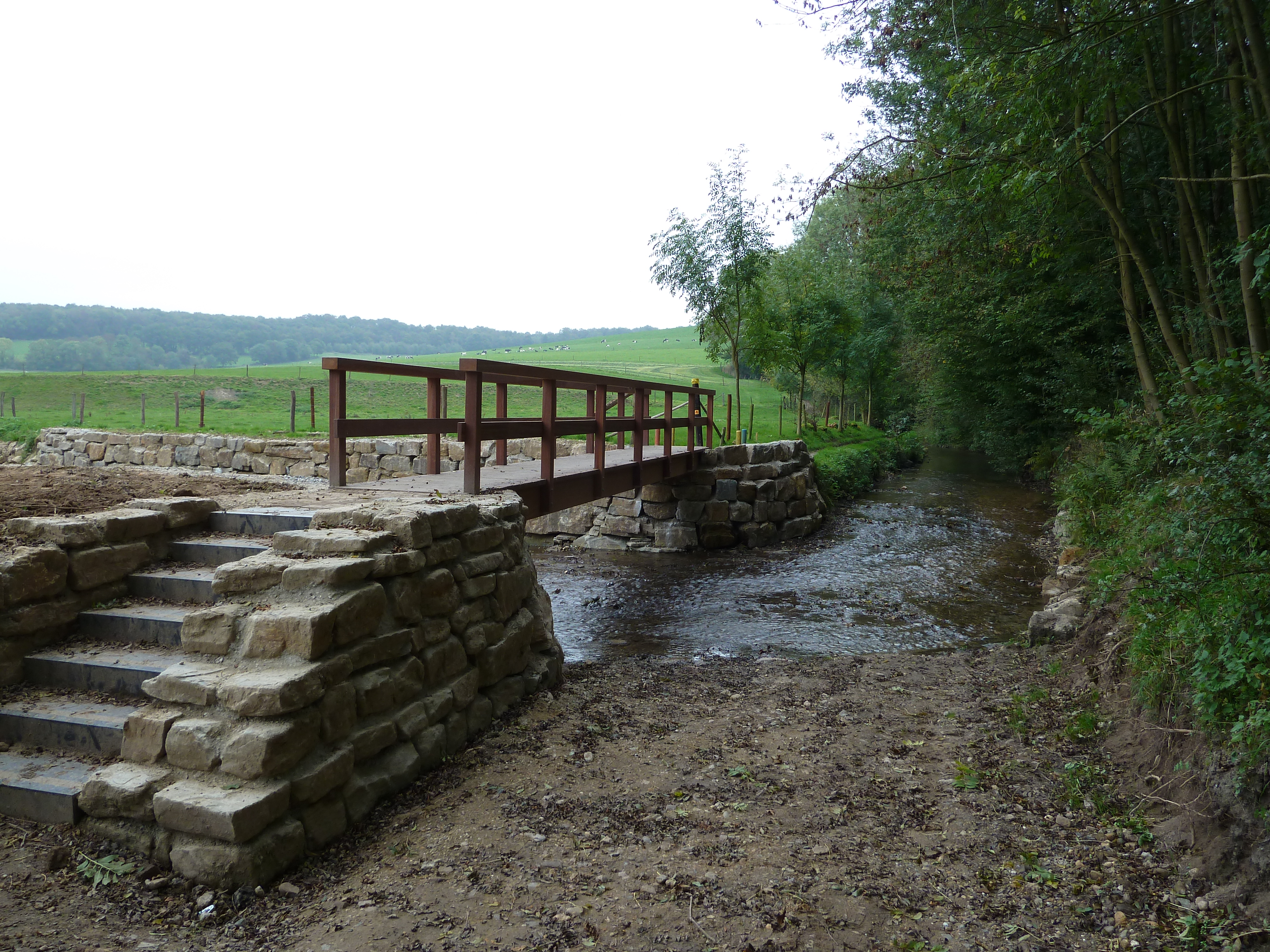
Crossing of the river Gulp

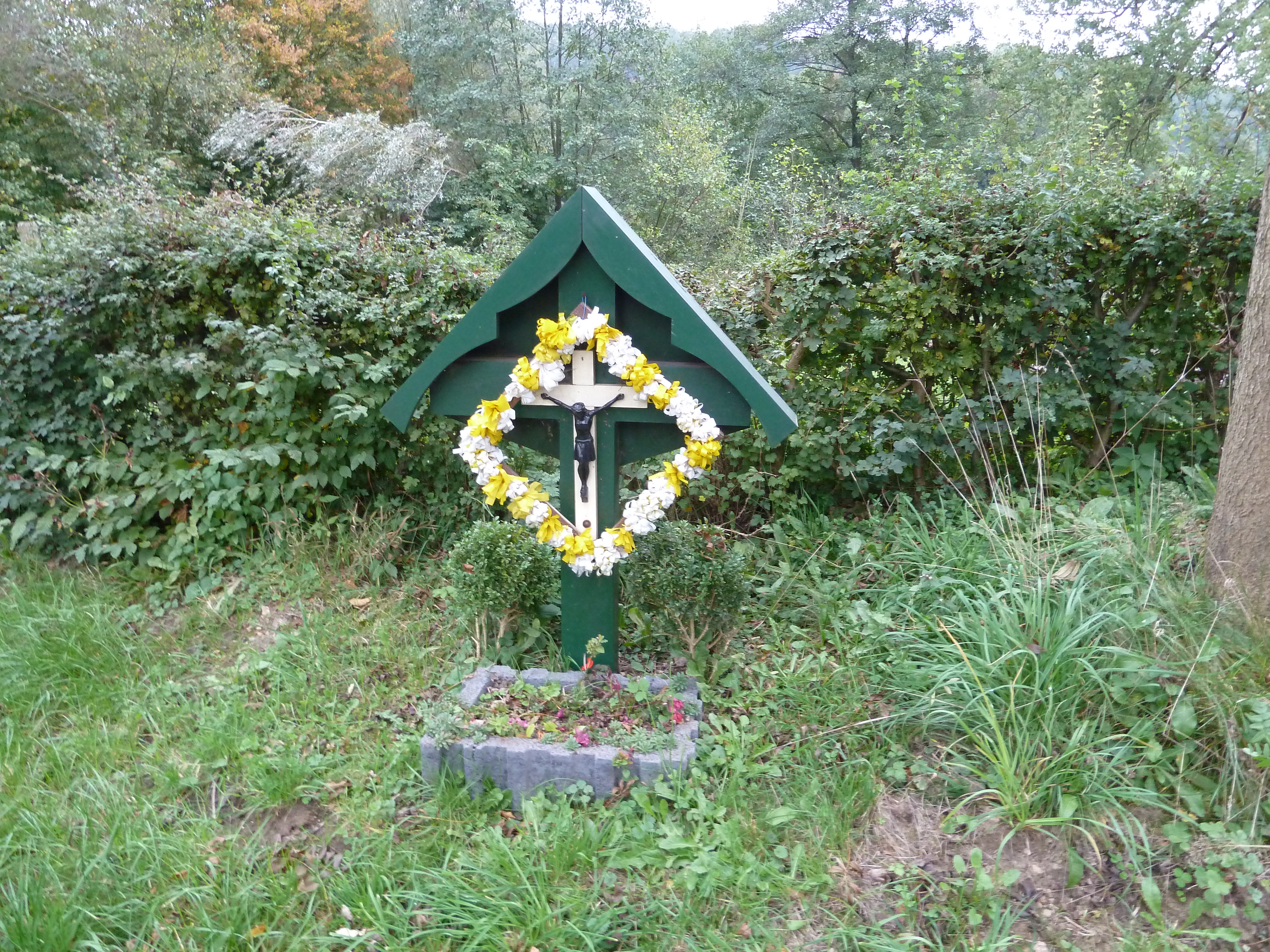
Road cross
