= Bissen (disambiguation) =

Bissen may refer to:

- Bissen, Luxembourg
- Bissen (Netherlands)
- Vilhelm Bissen (1836–1913), Danish sculptor
- Herman Wilhelm Bissen (1798–1868), Danish sculptor
- Georg Bissen, a trance artist and producer.
