= Truite d'Or =

Defunct restaurant in Gulpen, Netherlands

Coordinates: 50°48′15.68″N 5°52′24.55″E

- Interactive map of Truite d'Or

Restaurant information
- Location: Euverum 7, Gulpen, 6271 PJ, Netherlands

Truite d'Or is a defunct restaurant in Gulpen, Netherlands. It was a fine dining restaurant that was awarded one Michelin star in 1977 and retained that rating until 1980.

Head chefs of the restaurant in the time of the star were Theo Kurvers (1977) and Karel Swart (1978-1980).

== History ==
The restaurant finds it origin in a trout farm, built by the Nederlandsche Heidemaatschappij around 1898. Later, the farm was opened for visitors. The visitors could enjoy fresh trout in the restaurant beside the fish pool. In January 1967, the restaurant is first mentioned as being named Truite d'Or. In the beginning the restaurant was solely focused on trout, but after the take over by Martin Snellen, the card was widened. In 1976, the restaurant was renovated into a more French style. In 1977, head chef Theo Kurvers left and owner Martin Snellen decided to appoint Maître d'hôtel (and replacement chef) Karel Swart as the new head chef. In 1982, Snellen sold the restaurant but the new owners could not save the restaurant and it closed in 1985.

== See also ==
- List of Michelin starred restaurants in the Netherlands
