= Wijlre =

- Village
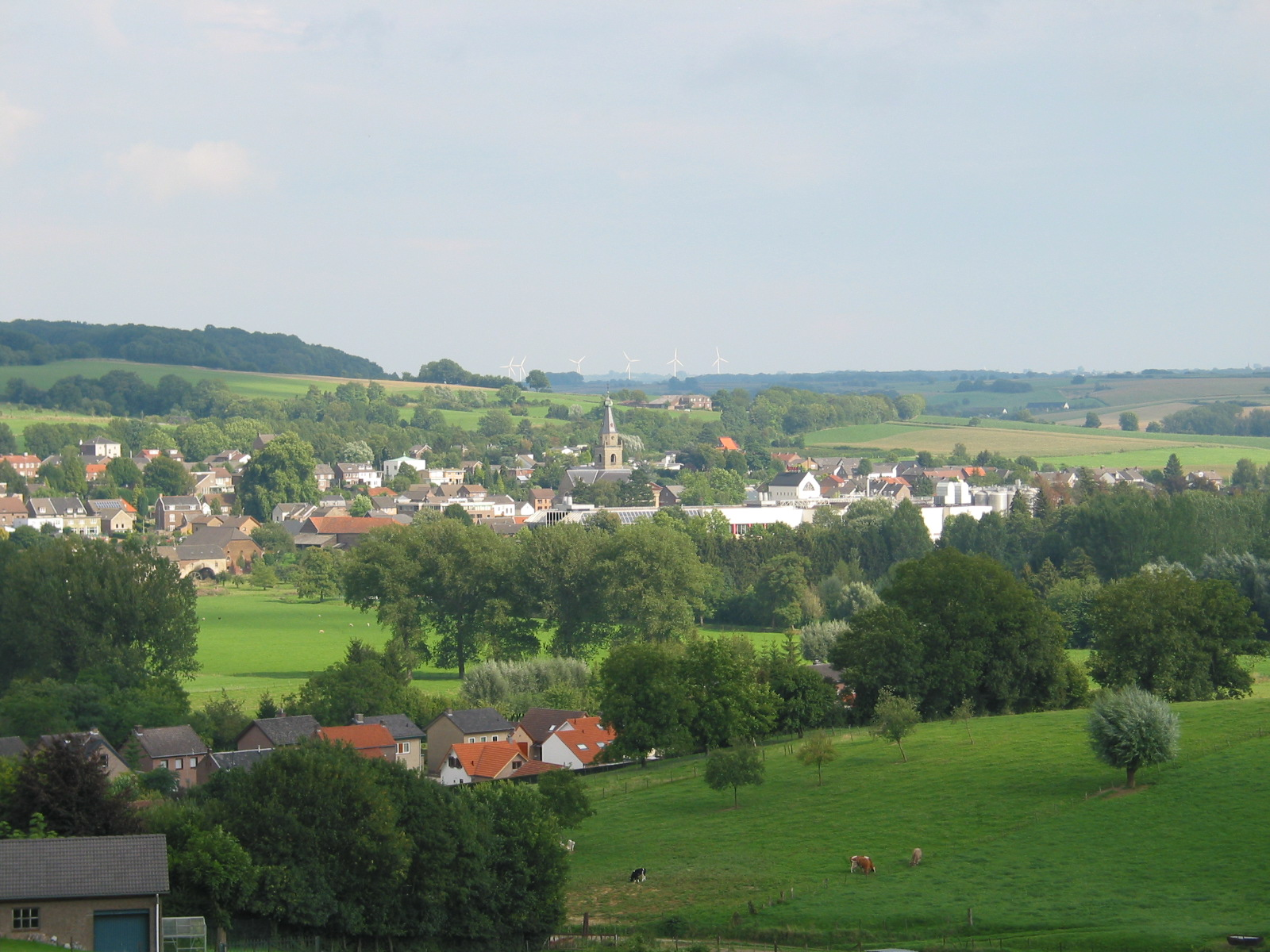

- Location in the Netherlands Location in the province of Limburg in the Netherlands
- Coordinates: 50°50′00″N 5°53′40″E
- Country: Netherlands
- Province: Limburg
- Municipality: Gulpen-Wittem

Area
  - Total: 0.97 km^{2} (0.37 sq mi)
- Elevation: 84 m (276 ft)

Population (2021)
  - Total: 1,930
  - Density: 2,000/km^{2} (5,200/sq mi)
- Time zone: UTC+1 (CET)
  - Summer (DST): UTC+2 (CEST)
- Postal code: 6320-6321
- Dialing code: 043
- Major roads: N595

Wijlre (Dutch: [ˈʋilreː] or [ˈʋilrə]; Limburgish: Wielder) is a village in the Dutch province of Limburg. It is located in the municipality of Gulpen-Wittem.

== History ==
The village was first mentioned in 1075 as Wilere, and means "farm or hamlet". Wijlre developed in the Middle Ages between the Geul and the flank of the Ubachsberg. It became an independent parish in 1262.

Wijlre Castle was built shortly after 1652 on the location of medieval fortified building. Three servant's wings with mansard roofs were added in the 18th century. The garden were designed in 1810. In 1939, a casemate was built near the entrance to the castle.

The Catholic St Gertrudis Church was built between 1835 and 1839 as a replacement of its 13th century predecessor. In 1896, the church was enlarged by Pierre Cuypers. Between 1924 and 1925, the eastern side with tower was added.

Wijlre was home to 420 people in 1840. In 1853, a joint railway station with Gulpen opened on the Aachen to Maastricht railway line. The station closed in 1988. In 1871, Brand Brewery was founded in Wijlre.

Wijlre was a separate municipality until 1982, when it was merged with Gulpen.

== Notable people ==
- Antoon Coolen (1897–1961), author

== Gallery ==
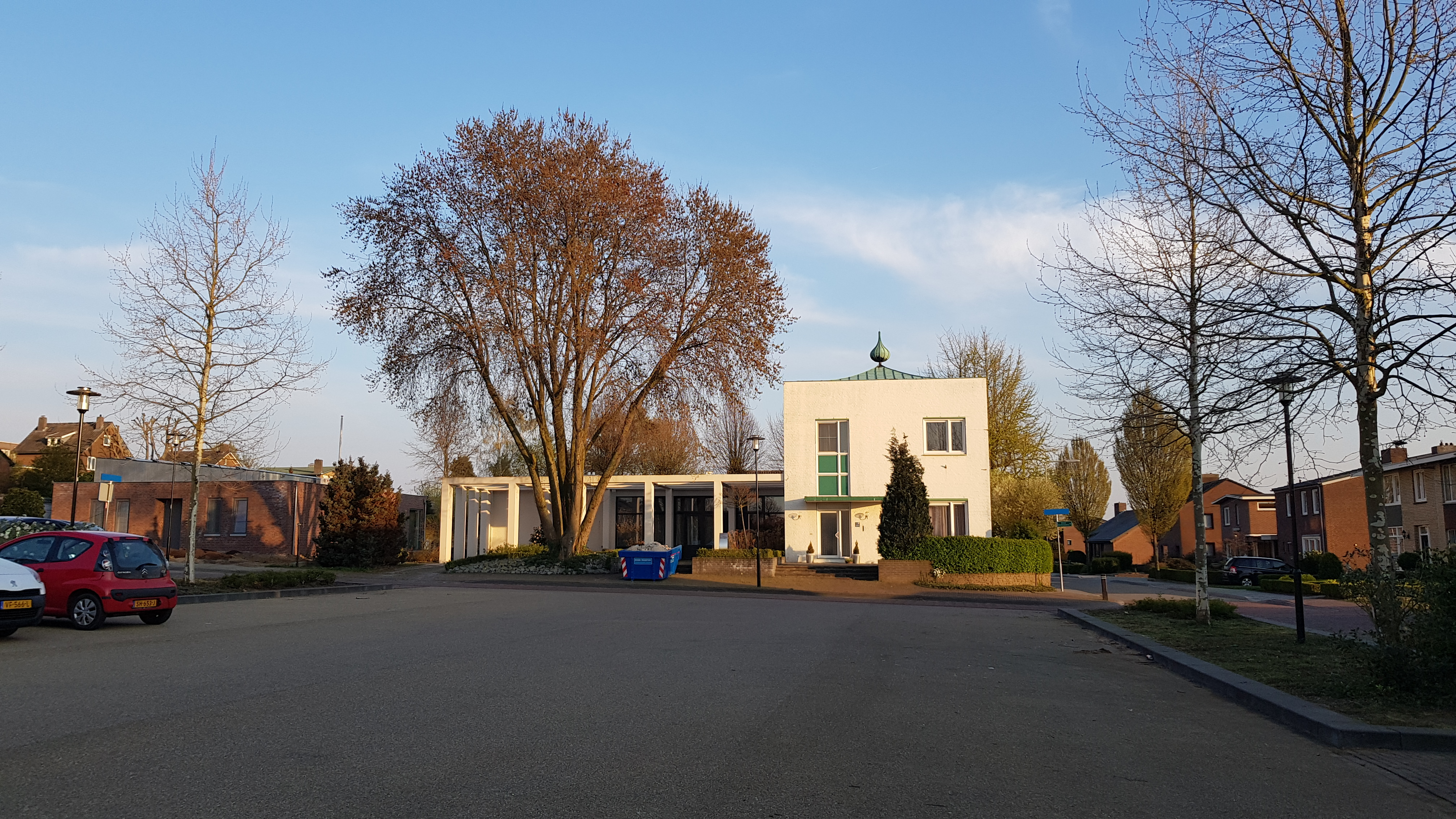
Former town hall

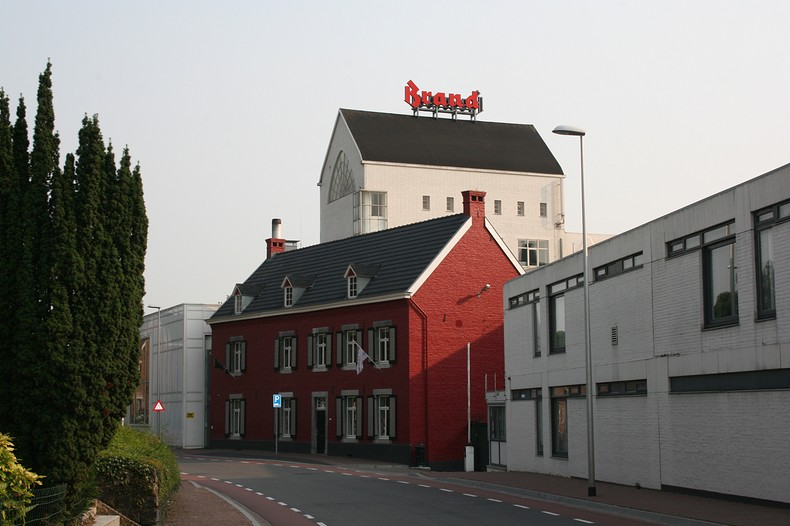
Brand brewery

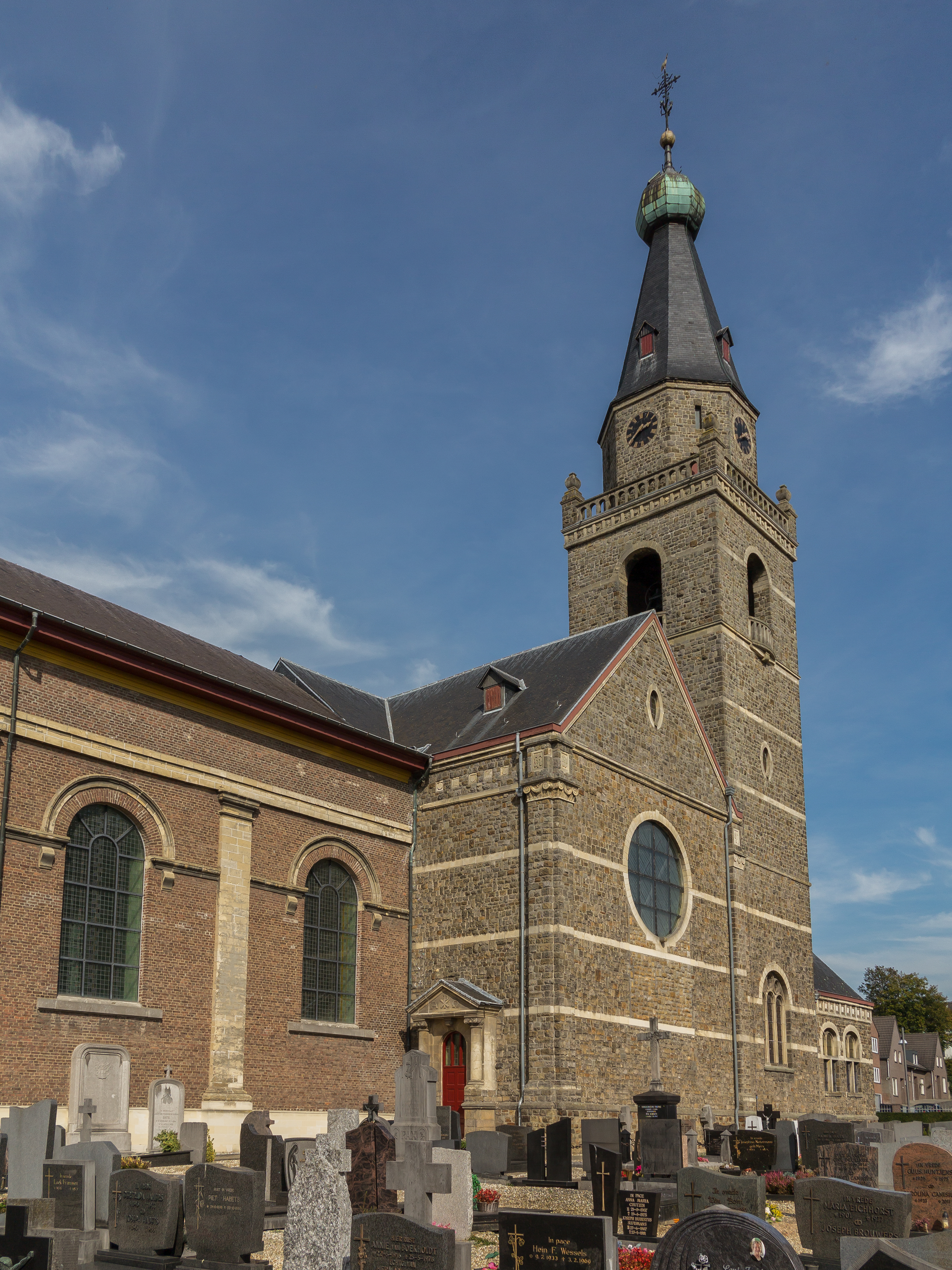
St Gertrudis Church

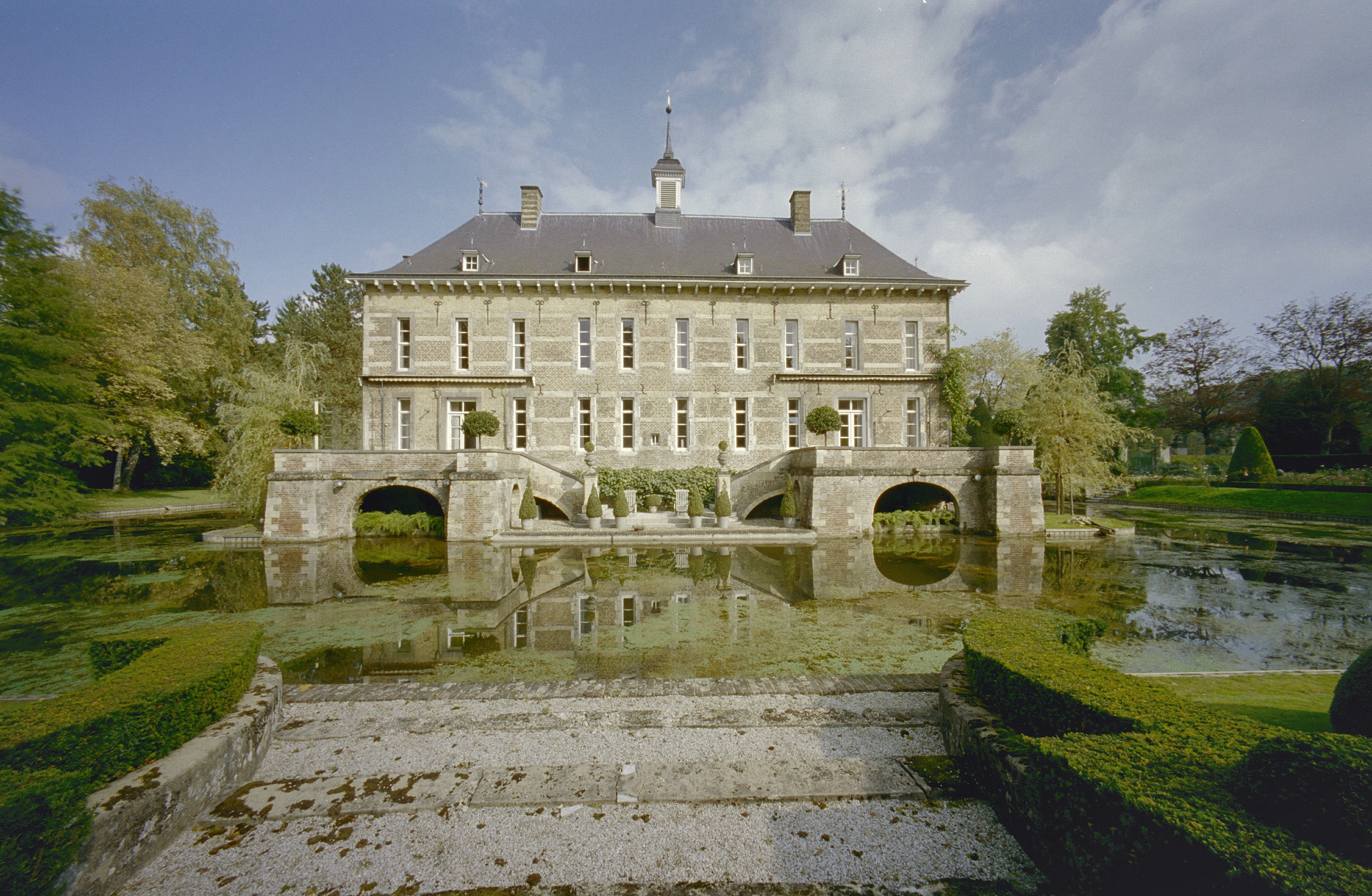
Wijlre castle

== See also ==
- Brand Brewery
