= Berghem (disambiguation) =

Berghem or Berchem may refer to:

- Berchem in Belgium
- Berchem, Luxembourg
- Berghem in North Brabant, the Netherlands
- Berghem, Limburg, a hamlet in the Netherlands
- Bergamo an Italian city in Lombardy named Bèrghem in Lombard
- Nicolaes Pieterszoon Berchem, a painter
- Swedish cities Gothenburg, Järfälla and Umeå have districts named Berghem (lit. Mountain-home)
