= Eyserheide =

Eyserheide Ezerhei
- Village
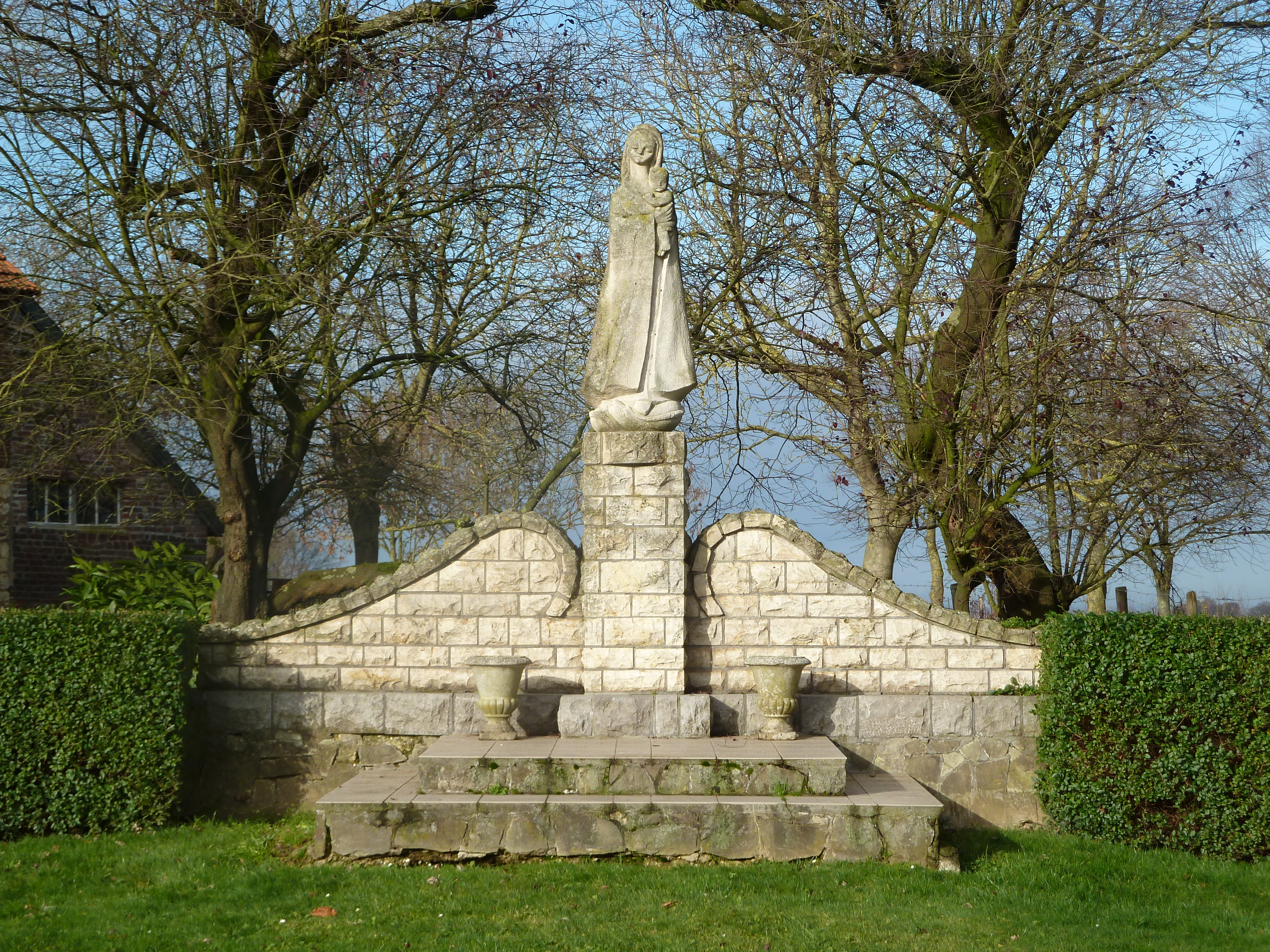
- Statue in Eyserheide

- Location in the Netherlands Location in the province of Limburg in the Netherlands
- Coordinates: 50.839167°N 5.931944°E
- Country: Netherlands
- Province: Limburg
- Municipality: Gulpen-Wittem

Area
  - Total: 0.65 km^{2} (0.25 sq mi)
- Elevation: 130 m (430 ft)

Population (2021)
  - Total: 125
  - Density: 190/km^{2} (500/sq mi)
- Time zone: UTC+1 (CET)
  - Summer (DST): UTC+2 (CEST)
- Postal code: 6285
- Dialing code: 043

Eyserheide (English: Eys heathland, Limburgish: Ezerhei) is a hamlet in the southeastern Netherlands. It is located close to the village of Eys in the municipality of Gulpen-Wittem, Limburg, around 15 km east of Maastricht. The name refers to a former heathland in the area. The village has a population of 90 people.

Together with the neighboring hamlets of Elkenrade and Mingersberg, it is located on the plateau of Ubachsberg. The village is known for the Eyserbosweg, a steep hill to the south of the village which is part of the Amstel Gold Race. To the west of the village is the forest Eyserbos.

== National monuments ==
The hamlet has four farms that have been designated national monuments.

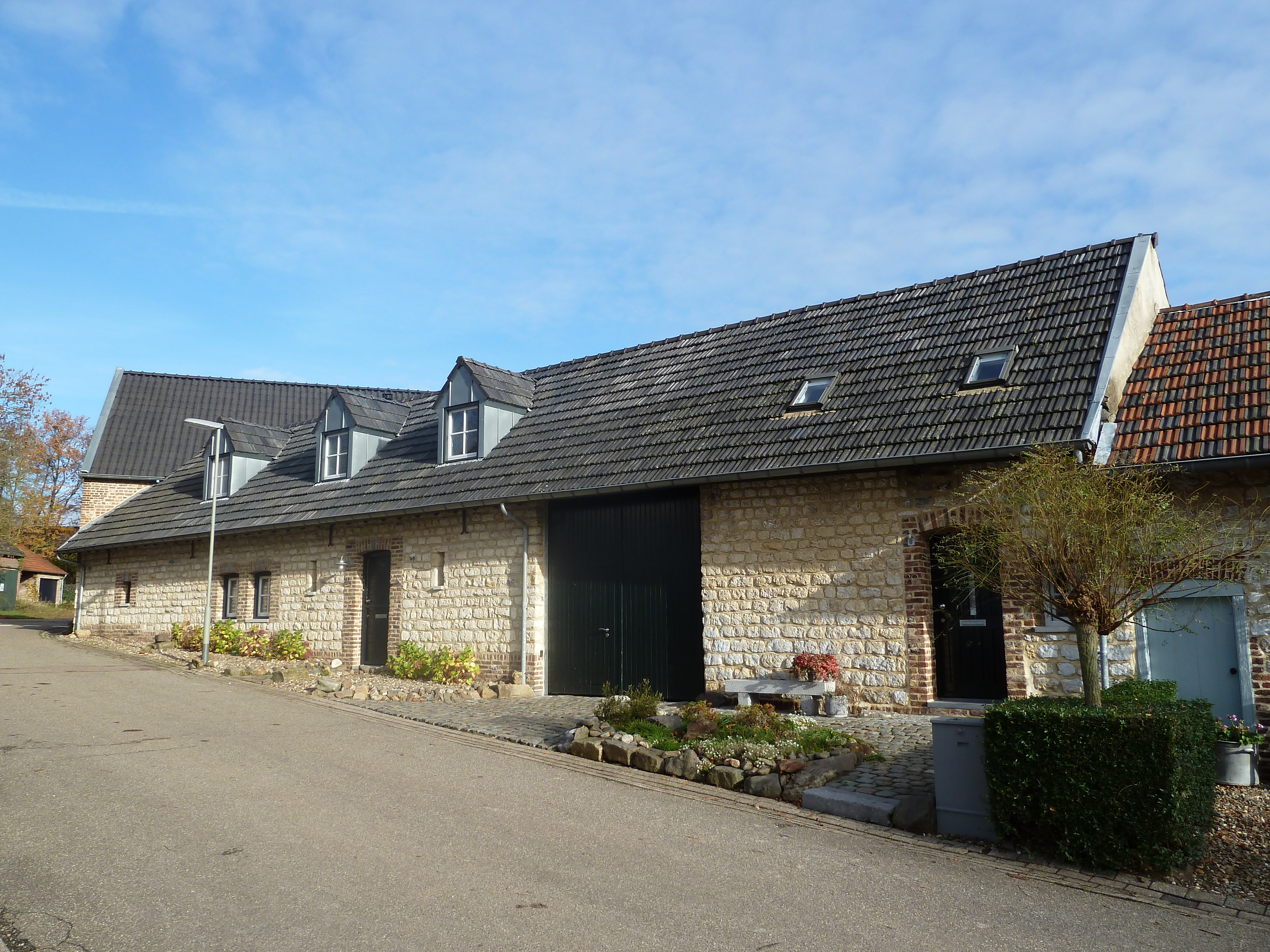
Eyserheide 29

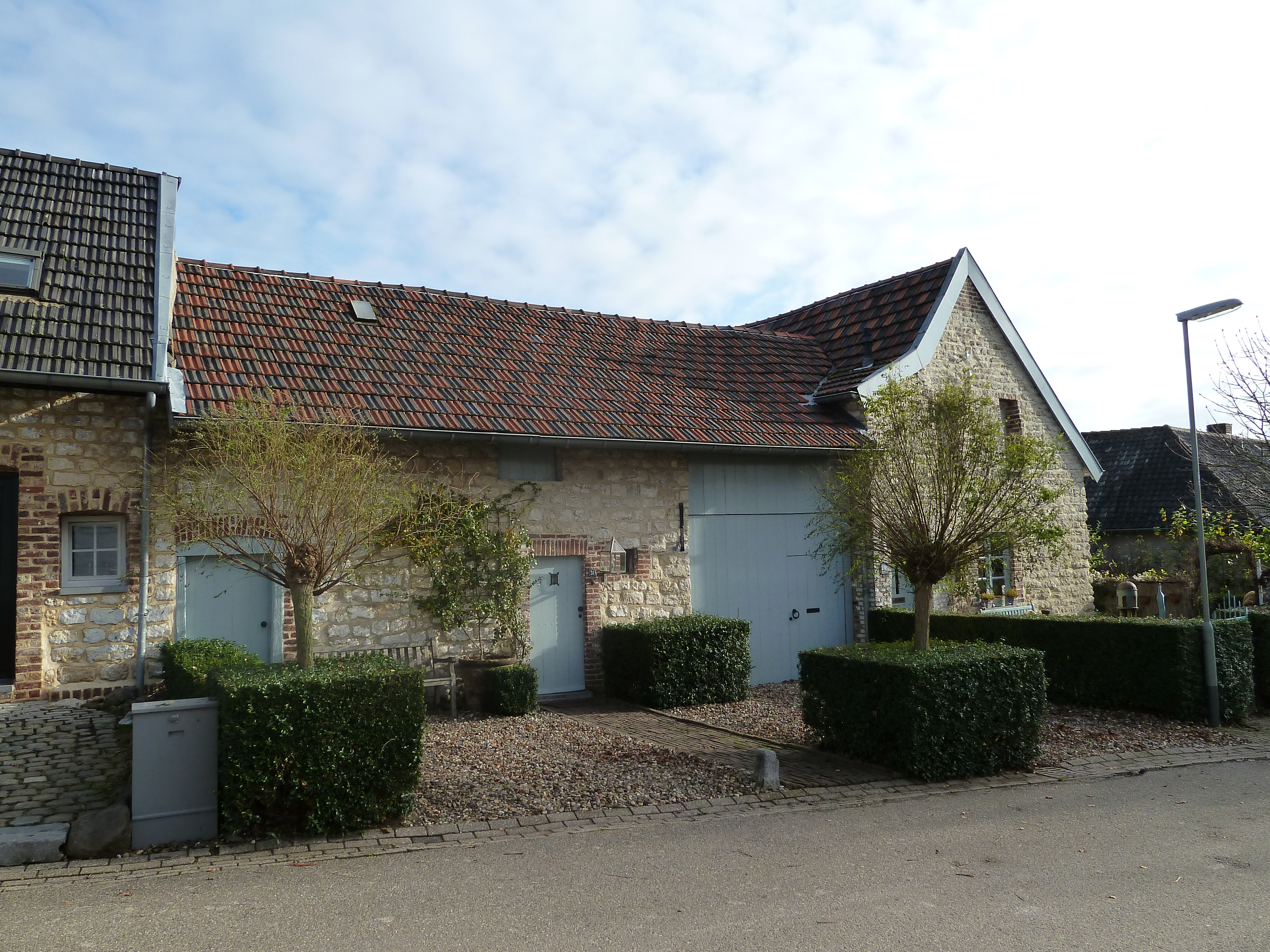
Eyserheide 31

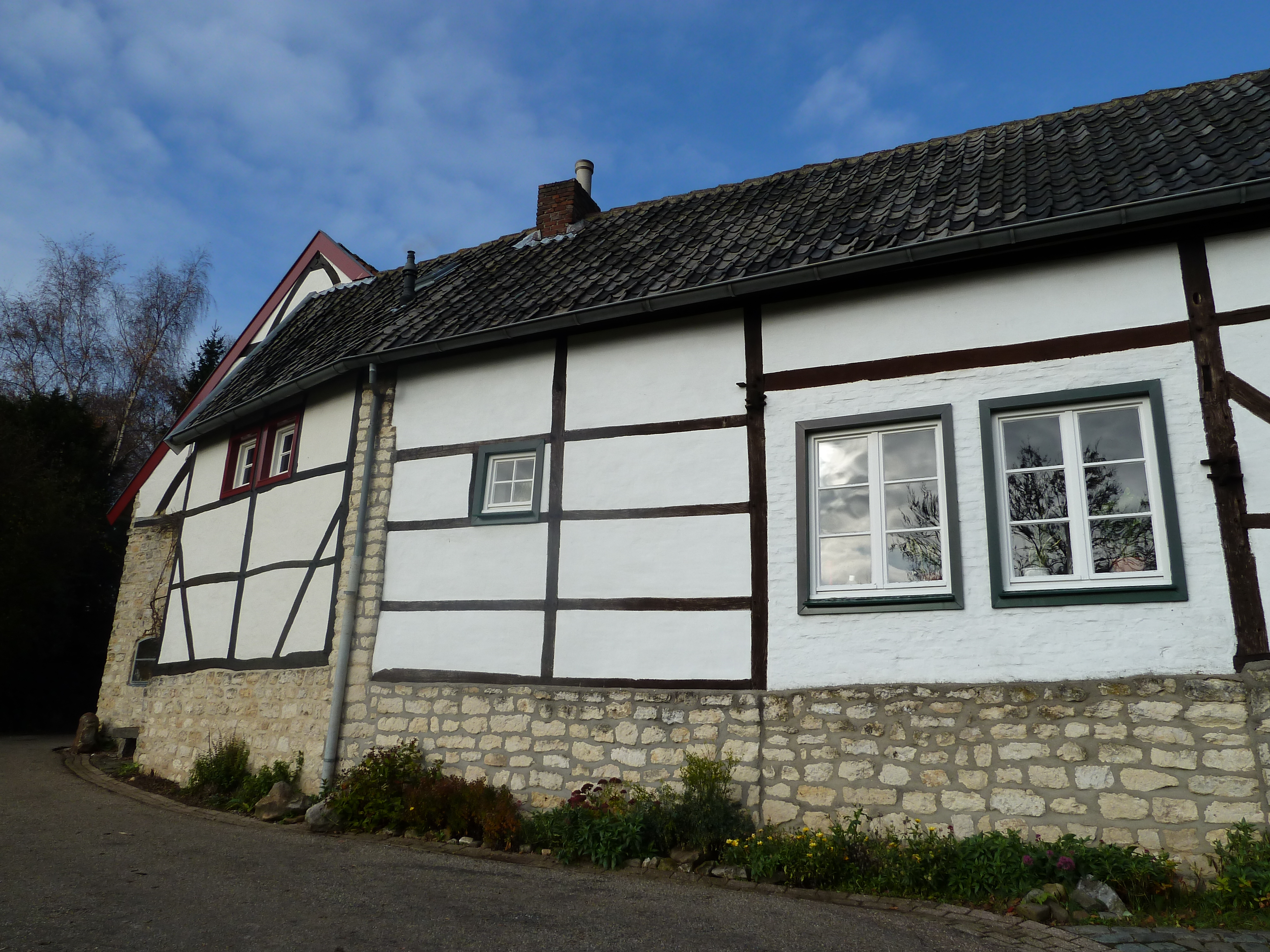
Eyserheide 35a

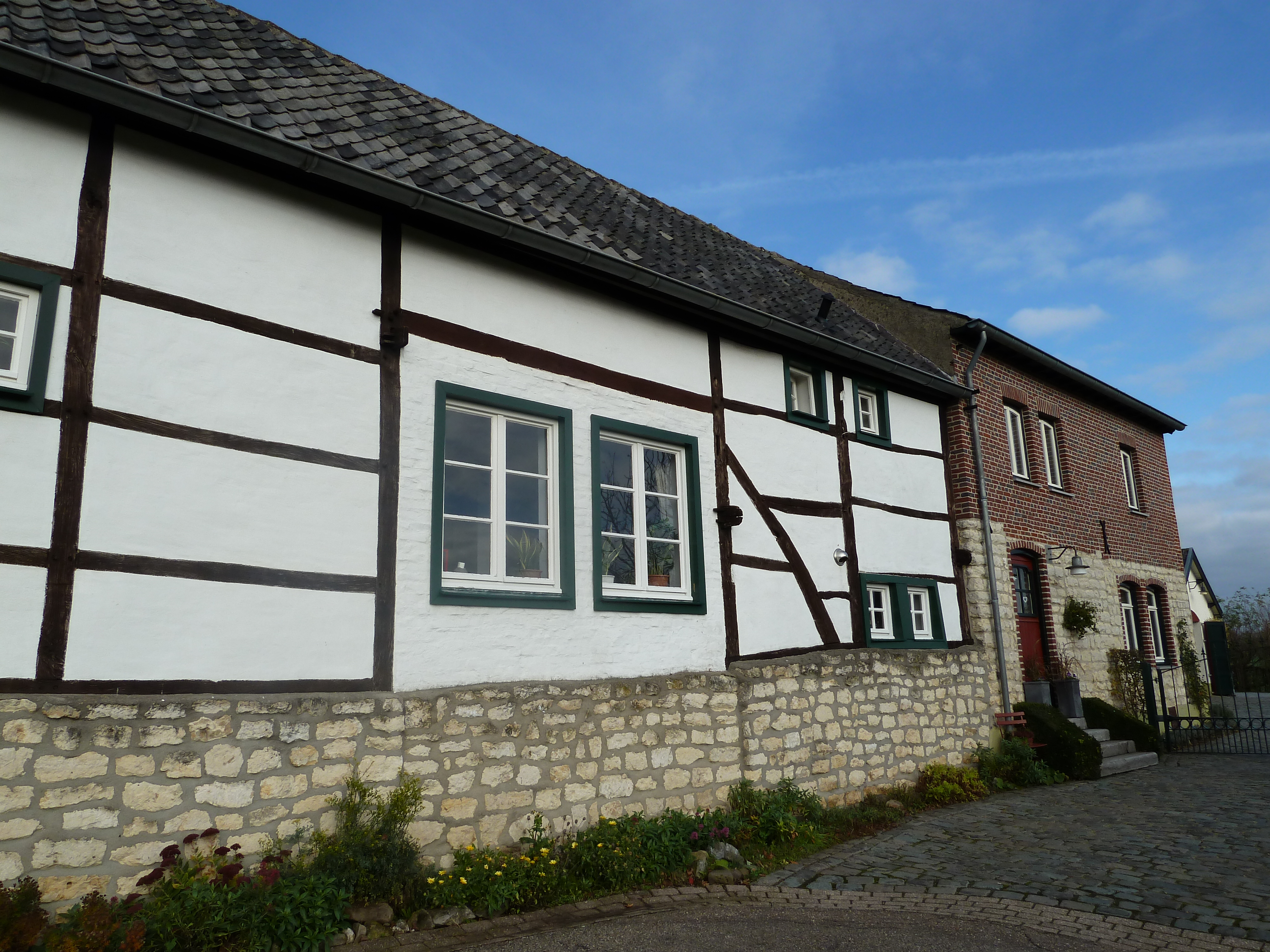
Eyserheide 37

== Notable people ==
- Mirjam van Laar - Dutch highjump recordholder
