= Helle, Gulpen-Wittem =

Helle
- Hamlet
- Location in the Netherlands Location in the province of Limburg in the Netherlands
- Coordinates: 50°47′9″N 5°55′45″E
- Country: Netherlands
- Province: Limburg
- Municipality: Gulpen-Wittem
- Time zone: UTC+1 (CET)
  - Summer (DST): UTC+2 (CEST)
- Postal code: 6281
- Dialing code: 043

Helle is a hamlet in the Dutch province of Limburg. It is located in the municipality of Gulpen-Wittem, about 1 km south of the village of Mechelen.

Helle is not a statistical entity, and the postal authorities have placed it under Mechelen. It has no place signs and consists about 10 houses.
