= Berghem, Limburg =

Berghem
- Hamlet
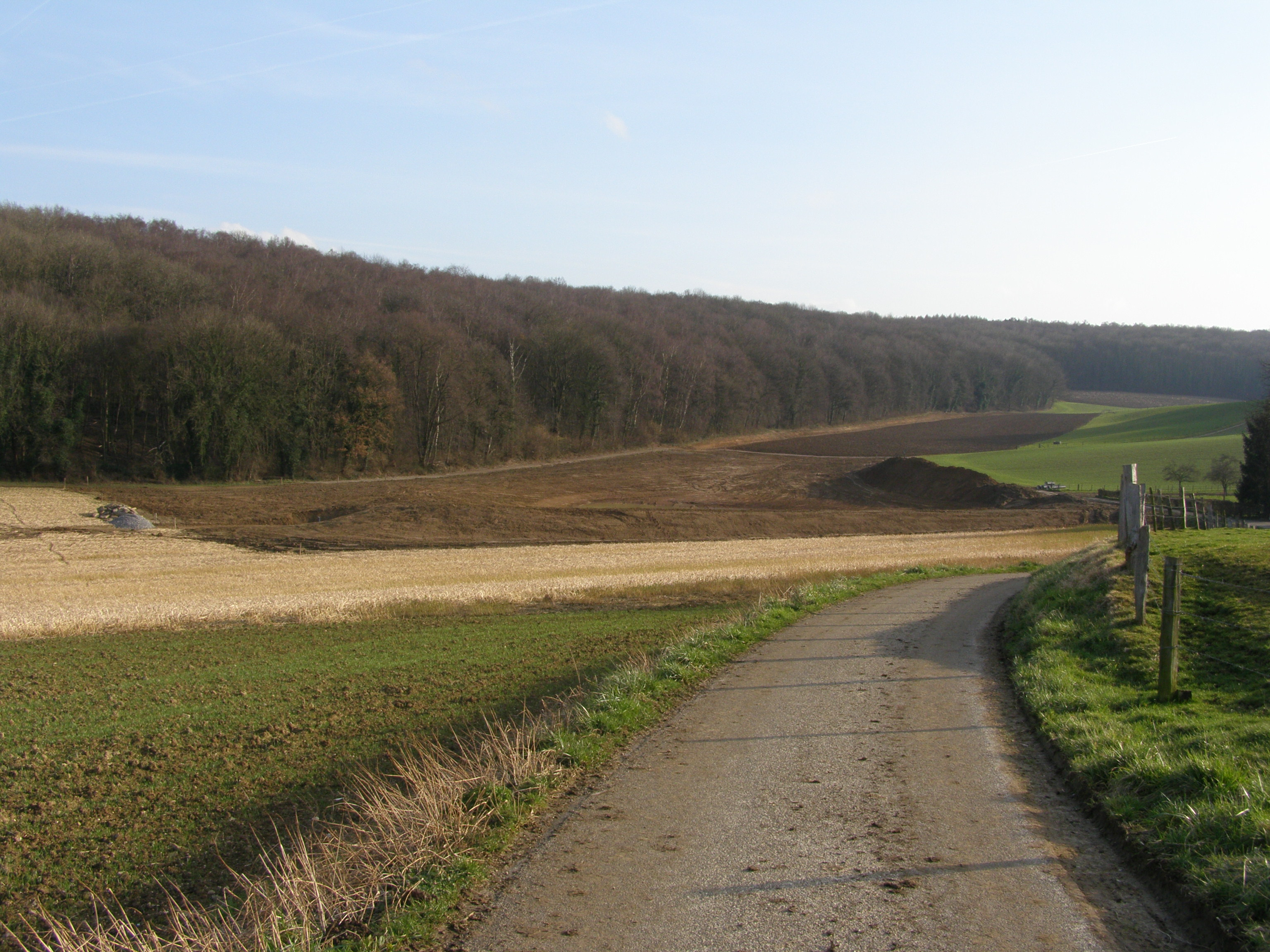

- Location in the Netherlands Location in the province of Limburg in the Netherlands
- Coordinates: 50.8073°N 5.8919°E
- Country: Netherlands
- Province: Limburg
- Municipality: Gulpen-Wittem
- Time zone: UTC+1 (CET)
  - Summer (DST): UTC+2 (CEST)
- Postal code: 6271
- Dialing code: 043

Berghem is a hamlet in the Netherlands, in the province of Limburg. It is located about 1 km south of the town of Gulpen, in the municipality of Gulpen-Wittem.

Berghem is not a statistical entity, and the postal authorities have placed it under Gulpen. There are no place name signs. It was home to 47 people in 1840. Nowadays, it consists of about 5 houses.
