= Slenaken =

Slenaken Sjlennich
- Village
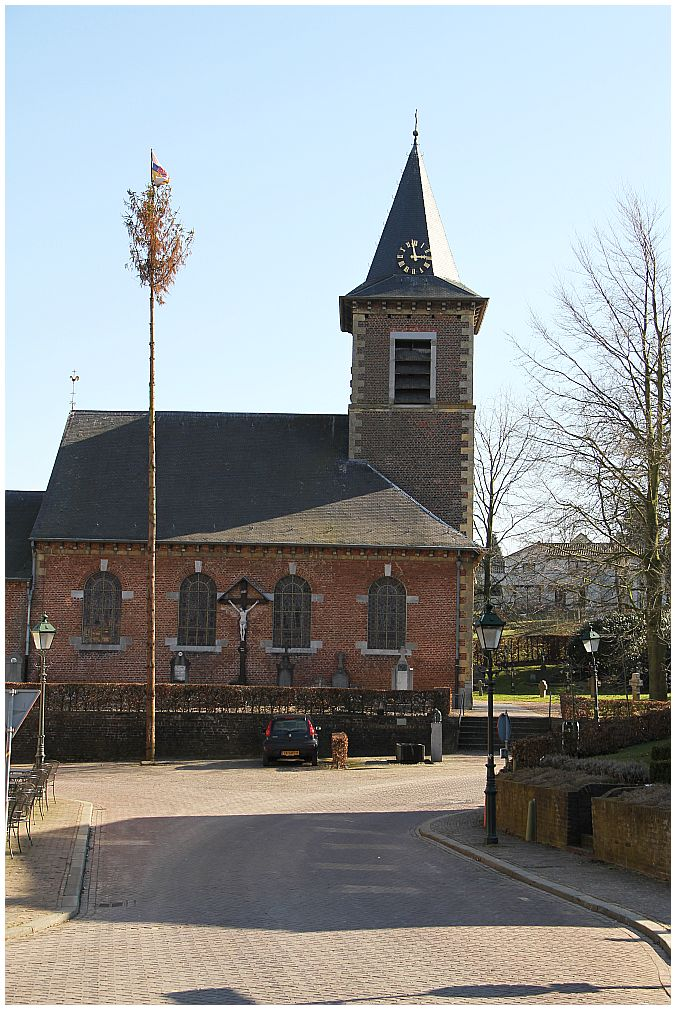
- Church of Slenaken

- Location in the Netherlands Location in the province of Limburg in the Netherlands
- Coordinates: 50°46′N 5°52′E
- Country: Netherlands
- Province: Limburg
- Municipality: Gulpen-Wittem

Area
  - Total: 2.38 km^{2} (0.92 sq mi)
- Elevation: 155 m (509 ft)

Population (2021)
  - Total: 375
  - Density: 158/km^{2} (408/sq mi)
- Time zone: UTC+1 (CET)
  - Summer (DST): UTC+2 (CEST)
- Postal code: 6277
- Dialing code: 043

Slenaken (Limburgish: Sjlennich) is a village in the Dutch province of Limburg.

Slenaken was a separate municipality until 1982, when it was merged with Wittem.

== History ==
On a bank of the River Gulp, just to the south of Slenaken, is the "grinding stone of Slenaken" ("Slijpsteen van Slenaken"), a large flint boulder used in the Neolithic period to polish stone axe heads.

The earliest surviving written record of Slenaken dates from 1252. At that time, along with the parish, Slenaken comprised a handful of houses and farmsteads. At some point before 1428 a small chapel was constructed. There is a legend that this was triggered when a shepherd saw one of his sheep kneeling before a "cross" in a burning bush. This inspired the villagers to build the little chapel, where they came together each Friday to venerate the Holy Cross. Starting in 1495, the site expanded and became a monastery.

By 1676 the village was part of the (today Belgian) parish of St. Martens-Voeren. In 1793, after a number of conflicts, the St. Remigus church, the current church, was built.

== Geography ==
=== Site ===
Slenaken is located in the municipality of Gulpen-Wittem in Limburg, and is one of the southernmost villages of the Netherlands, close to the frontier with Belgian Limburg, and along the valley of the Gulp river.

To the north of the village is the Loorberg Hill, with the village of Epen, beyond that, to the northeast. The village of Noorbeek lies to the west of Slenaken, and across the border to the south are the little settlements of Nurop and Teuven. Slenaken itself is ringed by the hamlets of Beutenaken, Heijenrath and Schilberg, which for many purposes are treated as part of Slenaken.

== Impressions ==
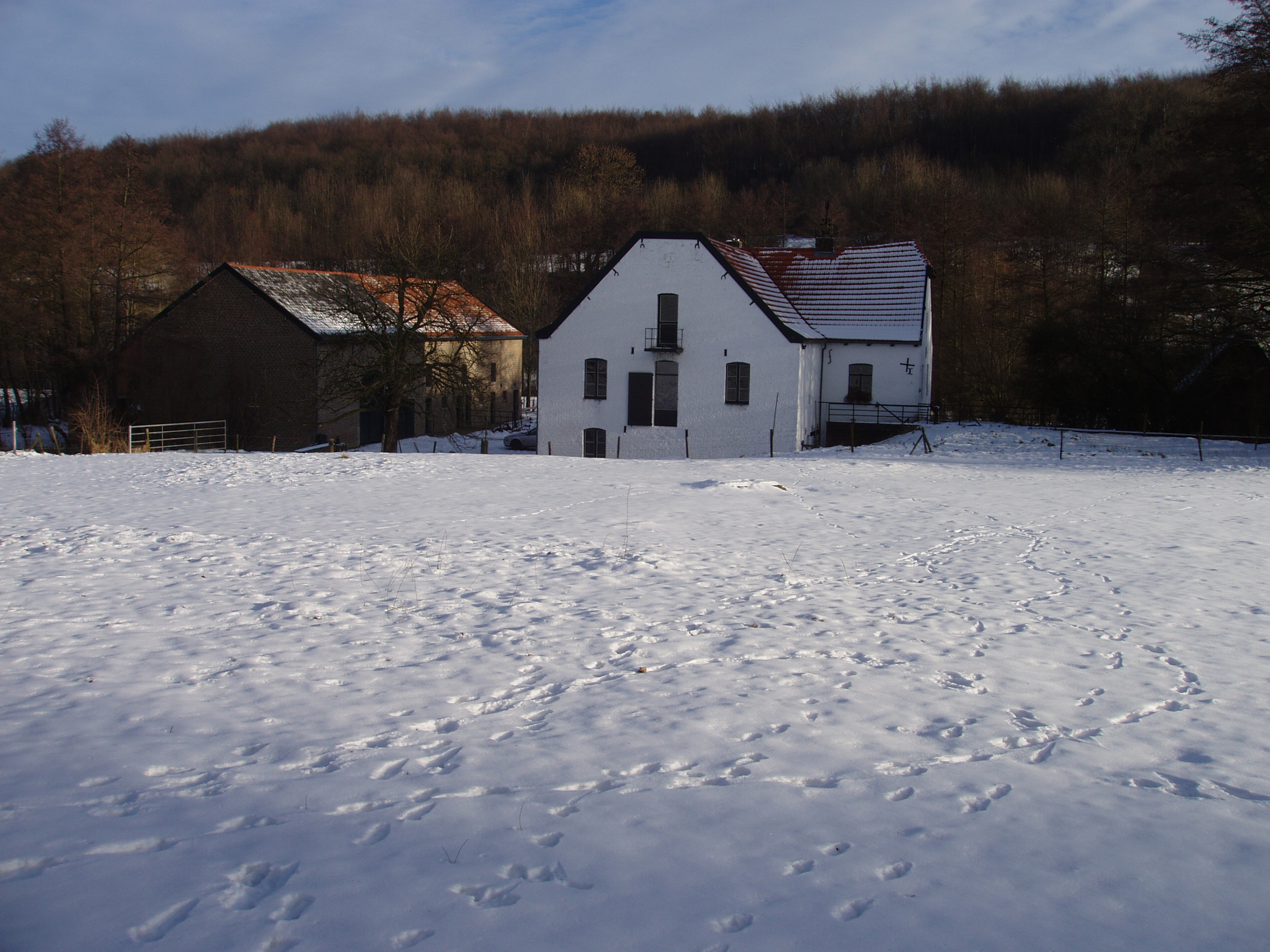
The Slenaker mill
