= Ingber =

Ingber is a surname. Notable people with the surname include:

- Donald E. Ingber (born 1956), American cell biologist and bioengineer
- Elliot Ingber (1941–2025), American guitarist
- Jeff Ingber (1935–2019), British table tennis player
- Mandy Ingber (born 1968), American yoga instructor and former actress
