= Antoon Coolen =

Dutch writer

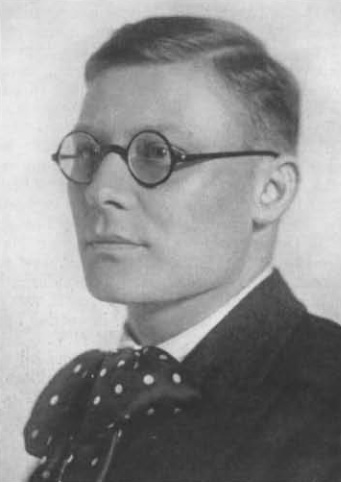
- Born: April 17, 1897; Wijlre, Netherlands
- Died: November 9, 1961 (aged 64); Waalre, Netherlands
- Occupation: Writer

Signature
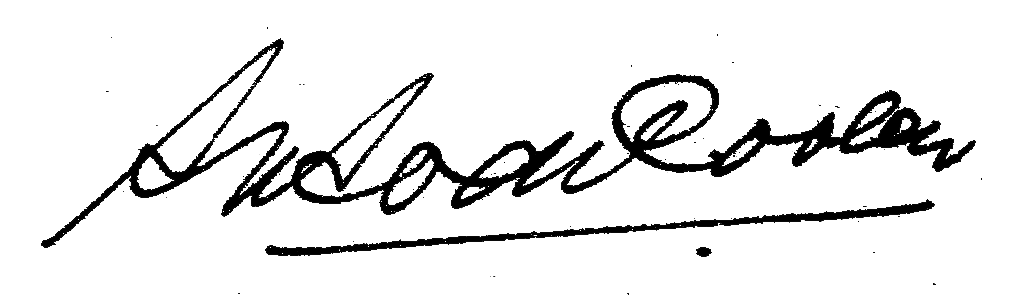

Antoon Coolen (April 17, 1897–November 9, 1961) was a well-known Dutch writer of novels. He wrote the Boekenweekgeschenk for the Boekenweek of 1947 and a novel that was part of the Boekenweekgeschenk in 1939.

== Translations in English ==
- Antoon Coolen: The golden webs. Transl. from the Dutch by Marten ten Hoor. Michigan, 1953
- Antoon Coolen: Christmas rose. Transl. from the Dutch by Marten ten Hoor. Michigan, 1952
- Antoon Coolen: The cross purposes. Transl. from the Dutch by Jacobine Menzies-Wilson. London, Collins, 1948
