= Bissen, Netherlands =

Bissen
- Hamlet
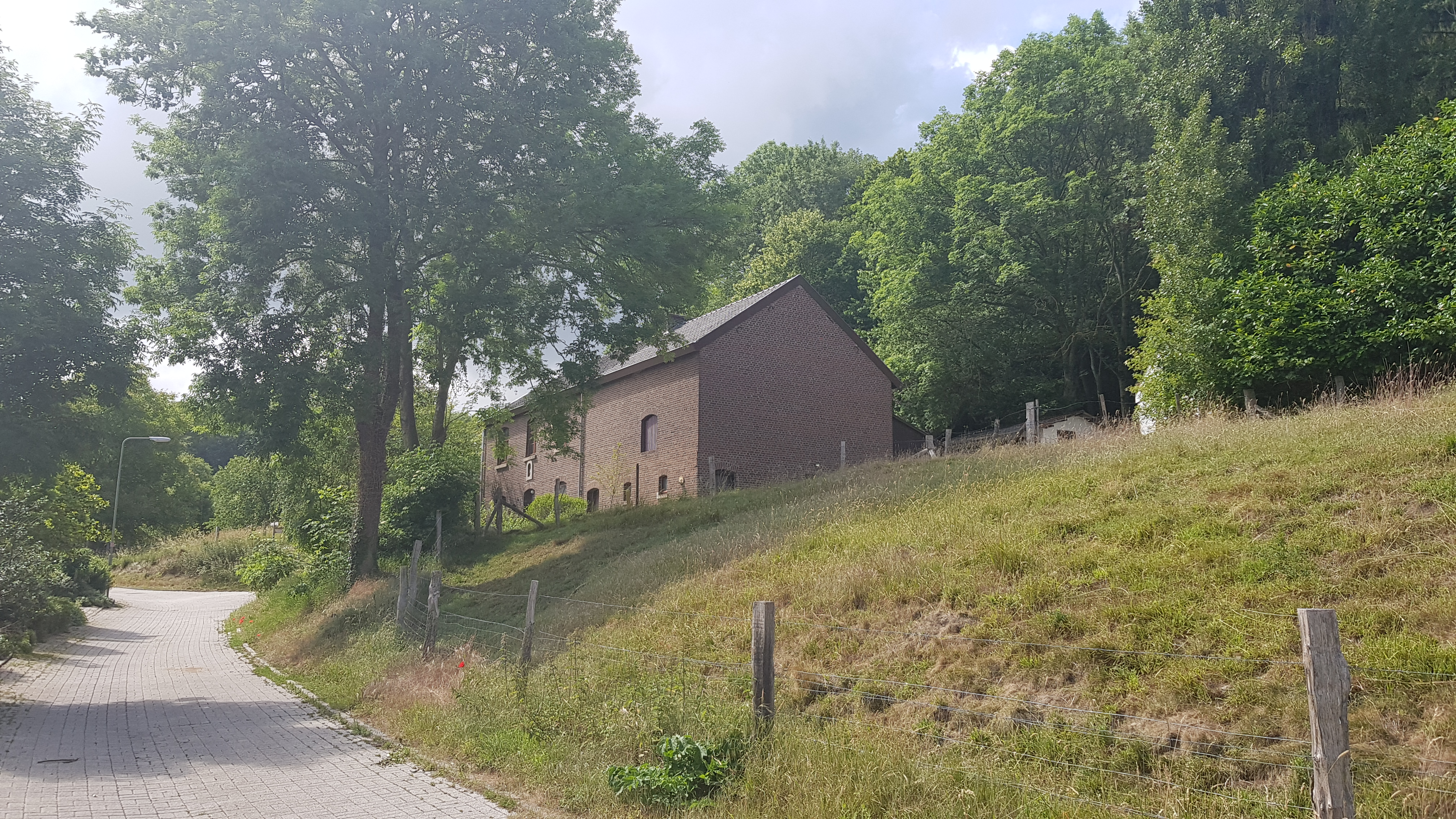
- Street in Bissen

- Location in the Netherlands Location in the province of Limburg in the Netherlands
- Coordinates: 50°47′18″N 5°54′5″E
- Country: Netherlands
- Province: Limburg
- Municipality: Gulpen-Wittem
- Time zone: UTC+1 (CET)
  - Summer (DST): UTC+2 (CEST)
- Postal code: 6281
- Dialing code: 043

Bissen (Dutch pronunciation: [ˈbɪsə(n)]; Limburgish: Bisse [ˈbɪsə]) is a hamlet in the Dutch province of Limburg. It is located in the municipality of Gulpen-Wittem, about 2 km (1.2 mi) southwest of the village of Mechelen. It was part of the municipality of Wittem until 1999.

Bissen is not a statistical entity, and the postal authorities have placed it under Mechelen. It has no place name signs and consists of about 20 houses. Together with the adjacent hamlet of Dal to the east, it forms the combined settlement of Dal Bissen, situated along the Dal Bissenweg.

== Geography ==
Bissen lies in the Heuvelland region in the valley of the Landeus stream, a tributary of the Geul. The hamlet is situated between the Schweibergerbos forest to the south and the hamlets of Schweiberg and Höfke to the north and northeast. The name Bissen likely derives from biezen, the Dutch plural of bies (rush).

The area around Bissen has been part of a rewilding project since 2011, managed by ARK Rewilding Netherlands under the provincial rural development programme. Highland cattle graze year-round on the slopes at the edge of the Schweibergerbos, promoting the development of natural forest edges with scrub and rough vegetation. The varied landscape provides habitat for species including the hazel dormouse, roe deer, red-backed shrike, viviparous lizard, and various bat species.

== Heritage ==
Bissen contains six rijksmonumenten, all half-timbered farmhouses (Dutch: vakwerkhoeven) dating from the 18th and 19th centuries. These include houses at numbers 4, 6, 7, and 8 on Dal Bissenweg, some with associated outbuildings. The half-timbered architecture is characteristic of the South Limburg region and particularly concentrated around Mechelen and its surrounding hamlets.

A roadside wayside cross (Dutch: ongelukskruis) stands at the northern end of the road through the hamlet, bearing the German inscription: "Hier starb durch ein Unglück am 6 April 1878 der Jüngling Johannes Leonardes van Hautem im Alter von 13 Jahre. Betet für die armen Seelen" (Here died by accident on 6 April 1878 the youth Johannes Leonardes van Hautem at the age of 13 years. Pray for the poor souls).
