= Gulpener =

Dutch brewery

Coordinates: 50°48′52″N 5°53′26″E

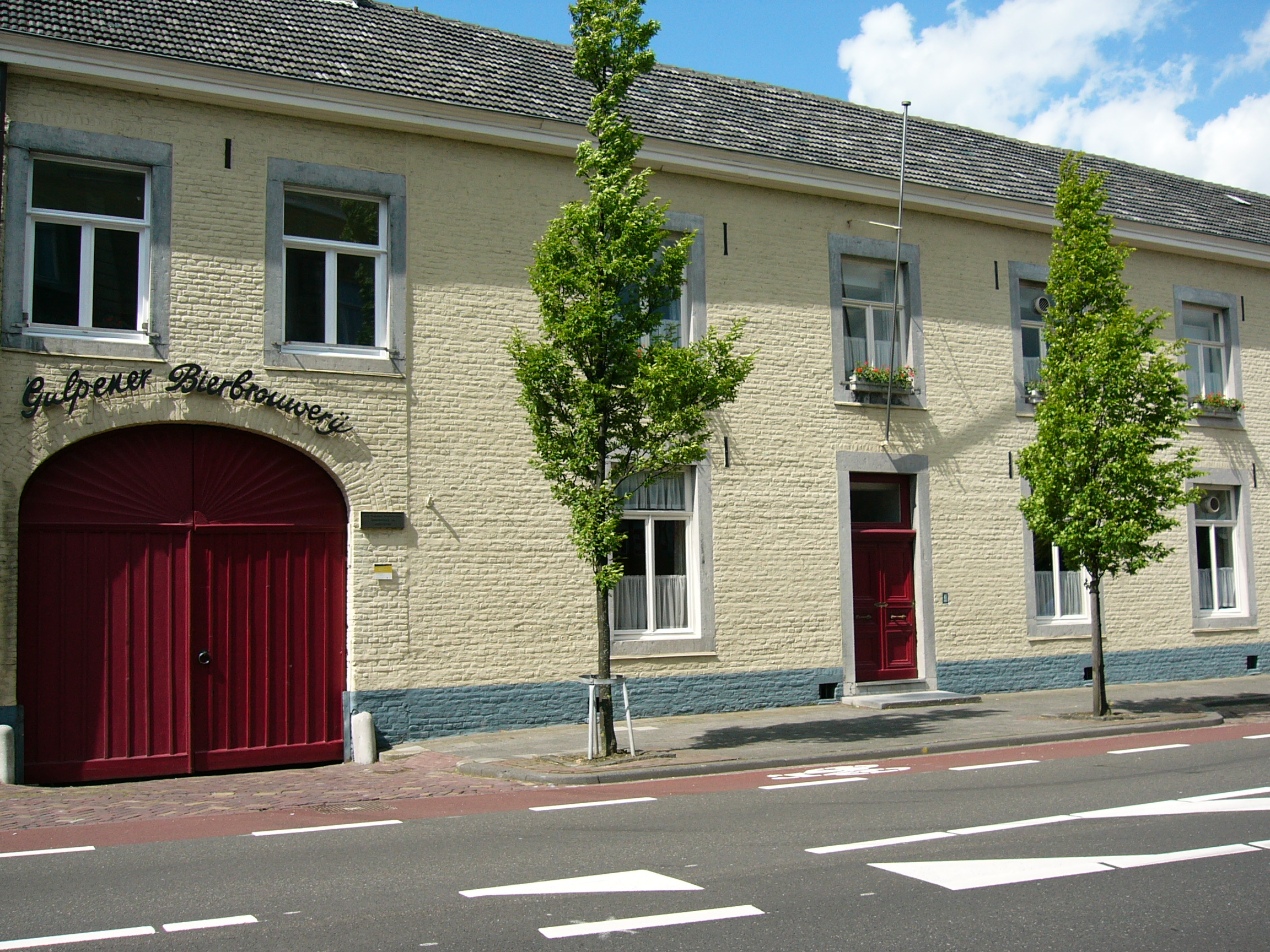
- Gulpener in Gulpen, Netherlands in 2006
- Interactive map of Gulpener
- Location: Gulpen, Netherlands
- Opened: 1825

Gulpener Bierbrouwerij BV is an independent Dutch brewery in Gulpen, Netherlands. The brewery was founded in 1825 by Laurens Smeets.

Gulpener makes a lager sold in the Netherlands. Ingredients, such as barley and hops, are sourced from local farmers. These farmers produce their products in ecologically friendly ways.

== Beers ==
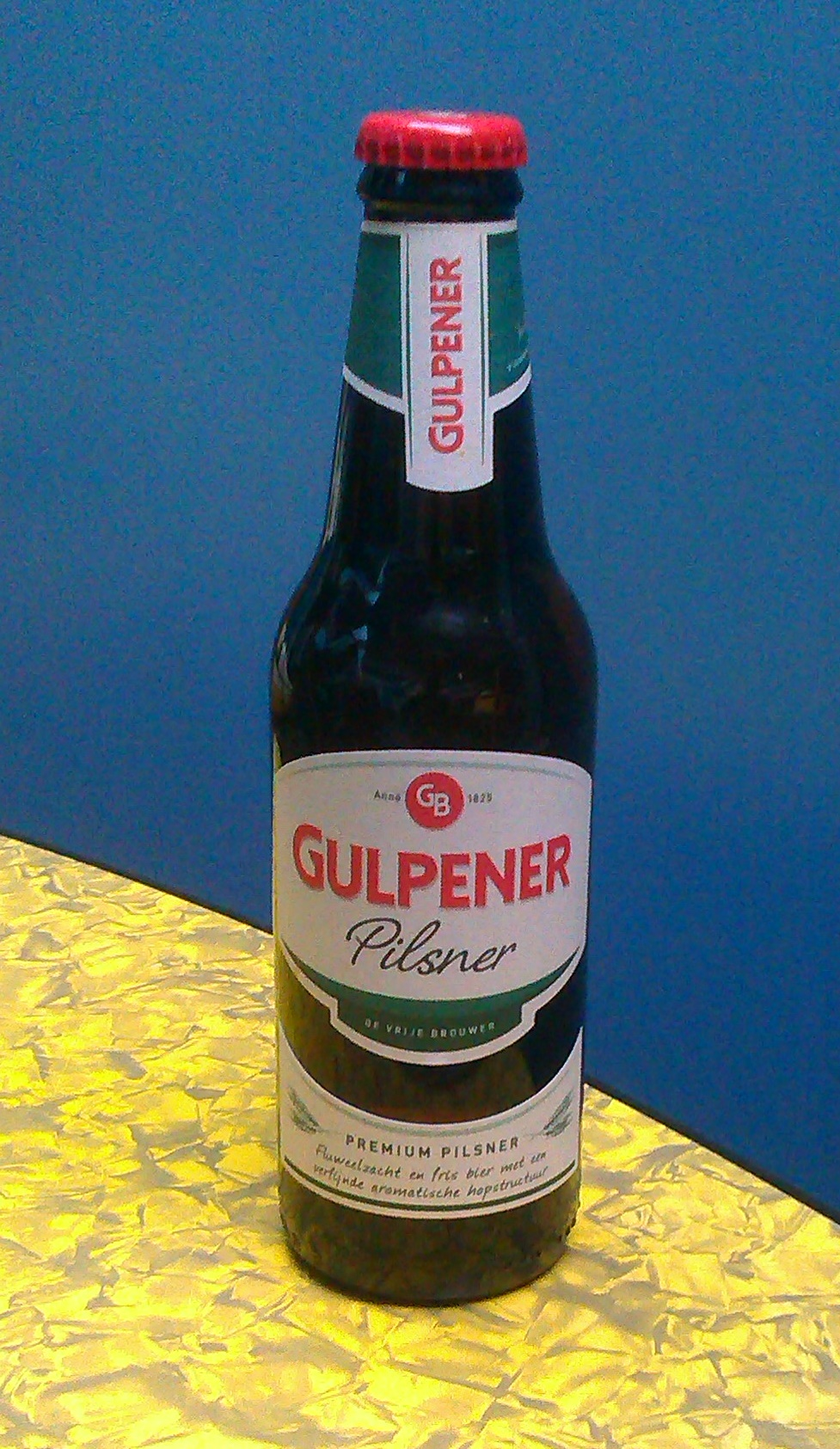
Gulpener Pilsner

The company makes the following beers:

- Gulpener Pilsner
- Gulpener Korenwolf
- Gulpener Dort
- Gulpener Oud Bruin
- Gulpener Lentebock
- Gulpener Herfstbock
- Gulpener Gladiator
- Gulpener Rosé
- Sjoes
- Château Neubourg
- Gerardus Wittems Kloosterbier Dubbel
- Gerardus Wittems Kloosterbier Blond
- Limburgs Land Eko Pilsner
- Mestreechs Aajt
- Gulpener Wintervrund
- Rowwen Hèze Bier
- Organic certified:
  - Ur-Pilsner (Pilsner)
  - Ur-Weizen (Weizen)
  - Ur-Hop (India pale lager)
- Zwarte Ruiter zuur bier
