= Gulpen =

Gulpen Gulpe (in Limburgish)
- Village
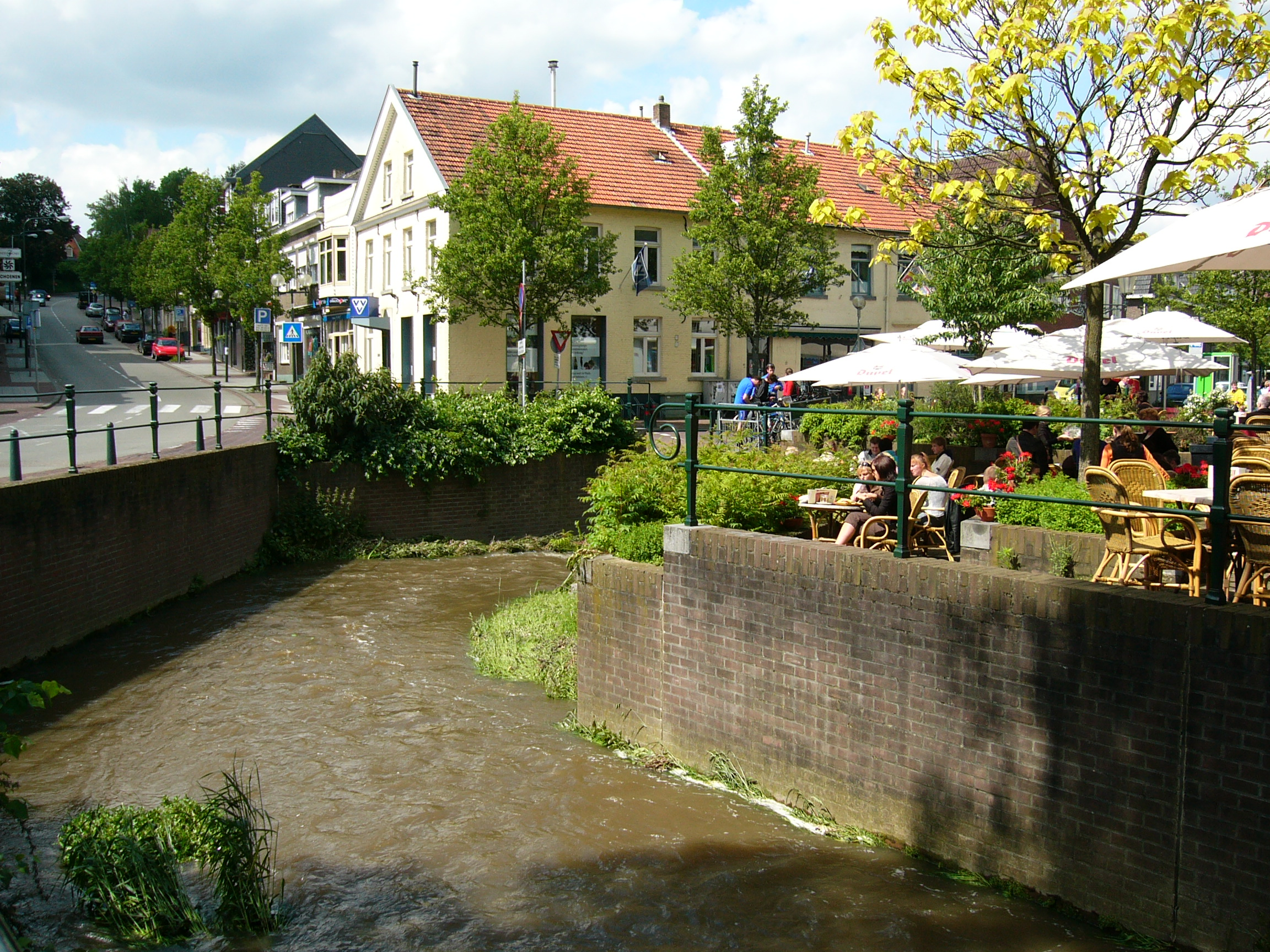
- Centre of Gulpen with river Gulp

- Location in the Netherlands Location in the province of Limburg in the Netherlands
- Coordinates: 50°49′N 5°54′E
- Country: Netherlands
- Province: Limburg
- Municipality: Gulpen-Wittem

Area
  - Total: 20.75 km^{2} (8.01 sq mi)
- Elevation: 94 m (308 ft)

Population (2021)
  - Total: 4,685
  - Density: 225.8/km^{2} (584.8/sq mi)
- Time zone: UTC+1 (CET)
  - Summer (DST): UTC+2 (CEST)
- Postal code: 6271
- Dialing code: 043

Gulpen (Dutch pronunciation: [ˈɣʏlpə(n)]; Limburgish: Gullepe [ˈɣʏləpə]) is a village in the Dutch province of Limburg. It is approximately midway between the Dutch city of Maastricht and the German city of Aachen.

Gulpen was a separate municipality until 1999, when it merged with Wittem. The newly formed municipality is called Gulpen-Wittem.

The village itself derives its name from the river Gulp, which runs straight through the centre of the village and characterises the townscape.

There is a Romanesque tower in the old cemetery, which dates from the 11th Century and is the only still existing part of a mediaeval village church. Considering its construction (its walls are up to 2 metres thick) and its location, it probably also served as defence tower, where the local villagers could go in case of danger. The former rectory, which leans against the tower, dates from 1732. It is now being let as luxurious group accommodation.

The current Neo-Romanesque St.Petrus church dates from 1924 and was designed by Casper Franssen.

A former monastery that was built in 1932 after a design by Alphons Boosten is being used as town hall.

The village is home to the Gulpener Brewery.

Every year in June, a walking tour of 70 kilometres is organised that is called the Nacht van Gulpen (Night of Gulpen). A little over a thousand people participate in this event each year.
