= Aalbeek =

Aalbeek Aolbaek (Limburgish)
- Hamlet
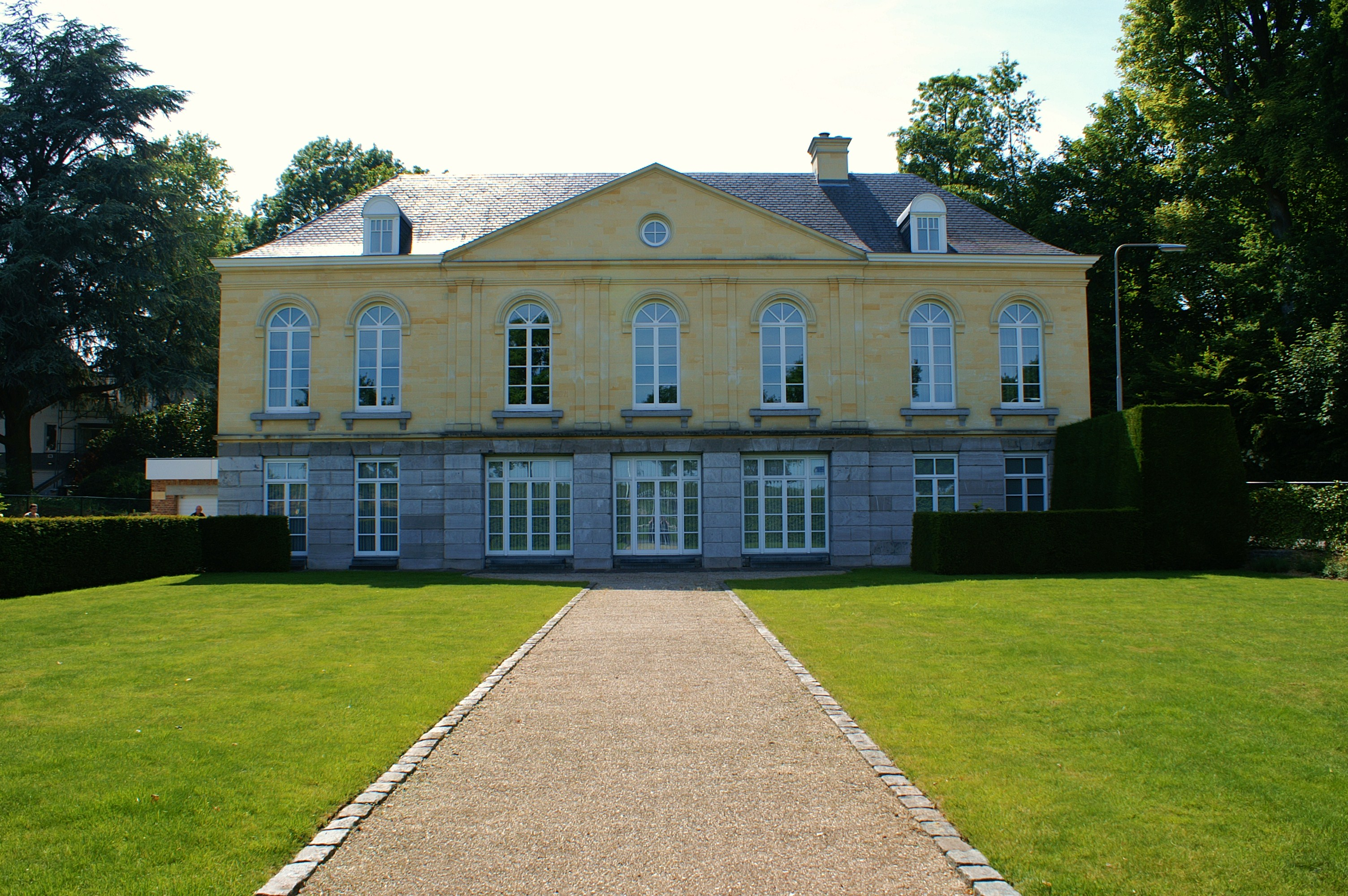
- Villa Aalbeek

- Location in the Netherlands Location in the province of Limburg in the Netherlands
- Coordinates: 50°54′N 5°51′E
- Country: Netherlands
- Province: Limburg
- Municipality: Beekdaelen
- Village: Hulsberg
- Elevation: 121.1 m (397 ft)

Population
  - Total: c. 200
- Time zone: UTC+1 (CET)
  - Summer (DST): UTC+2 (CEST)
- Postcode: 6336
- Area code: 045

Aalbeek (Dutch: [ˈaːlbeːk]; Limburgish: Aolbaek) is a hamlet in the municipality of Beekdaelen in the province of Limburg in the Netherlands. Administratively, it is part of the village of Hulsberg.

Aalbeek consists of a winding strap of approximately 115 houses and farms in a dry valley, surrounded by agricultural and horticultural areas and nature.

== History ==
Aalbeek is one of the old settlements in central South Limburg. The first mention of the name was as Oelbeek in 1324. This name indicates 'low-lying land, damp place'.

The Aalbeek estate, which dates from the seventeenth century, was centrally located in the village. This later became the country residence with an English garden of André Charles Membrede (1758–1831), once speaker of the House of Representatives of the States General under King William I of the Netherlands. The mansion was demolished in 1911 to make way for a Jesuit monastery, which was in turn demolished in 1992. The former coach house of the original Aalbeek estate has been preserved and, after a major renovation, is known as Villa Aalbeek, surrounded by eight modern villas.

Aalbeek, although small, belonged to two municipalities until the reorganization in 1982. The largest part belonged to Hulsberg, some farms belonged to Wijnandsrade. This special situation came to an end when all of Hulsberg and Wijnandsrade were madepart of the municipality of Nuth. However, since another reorganisation in 2019, Aalbeek belongs to the municipality of Beekdaelen.

== 'Center of the world' ==
During the reorganisation, then mayor Chris Rutten of Nuth had a column placed near Villa Aalbeek with the Latin inscription Aalbeek centrum orbis. Rutten defended this claim that Aalbeek is the center of the world by stating that Aalbeek is located in the middle of the municipality of Nuth, which in turn occupies a central position in South Limburg. At the time, this region was located in the middle of the EEC and Western Europe, in short, in the middle of Europe, the center of the Old World.

== Sights ==
- Chapel of Our Lady of the Sacred Heart on the Nieuwenhuysstraat, devotional chapel from 1952
- Maria Chapel on the intersection of the Aalbekerweg and the Nieuwenhuysstraat, from 1935
- Villa Aalbeek, former Jesuit monastery of which the coach house still remains
- Farmhouses:
  - Haasdallerweg 1, closed farm with 17th-century core, with alternating stone bands and gate from 1829
  - Aalbekerweg 85–89, with 18th-century core, gate keystone from 1838

== Gallery ==
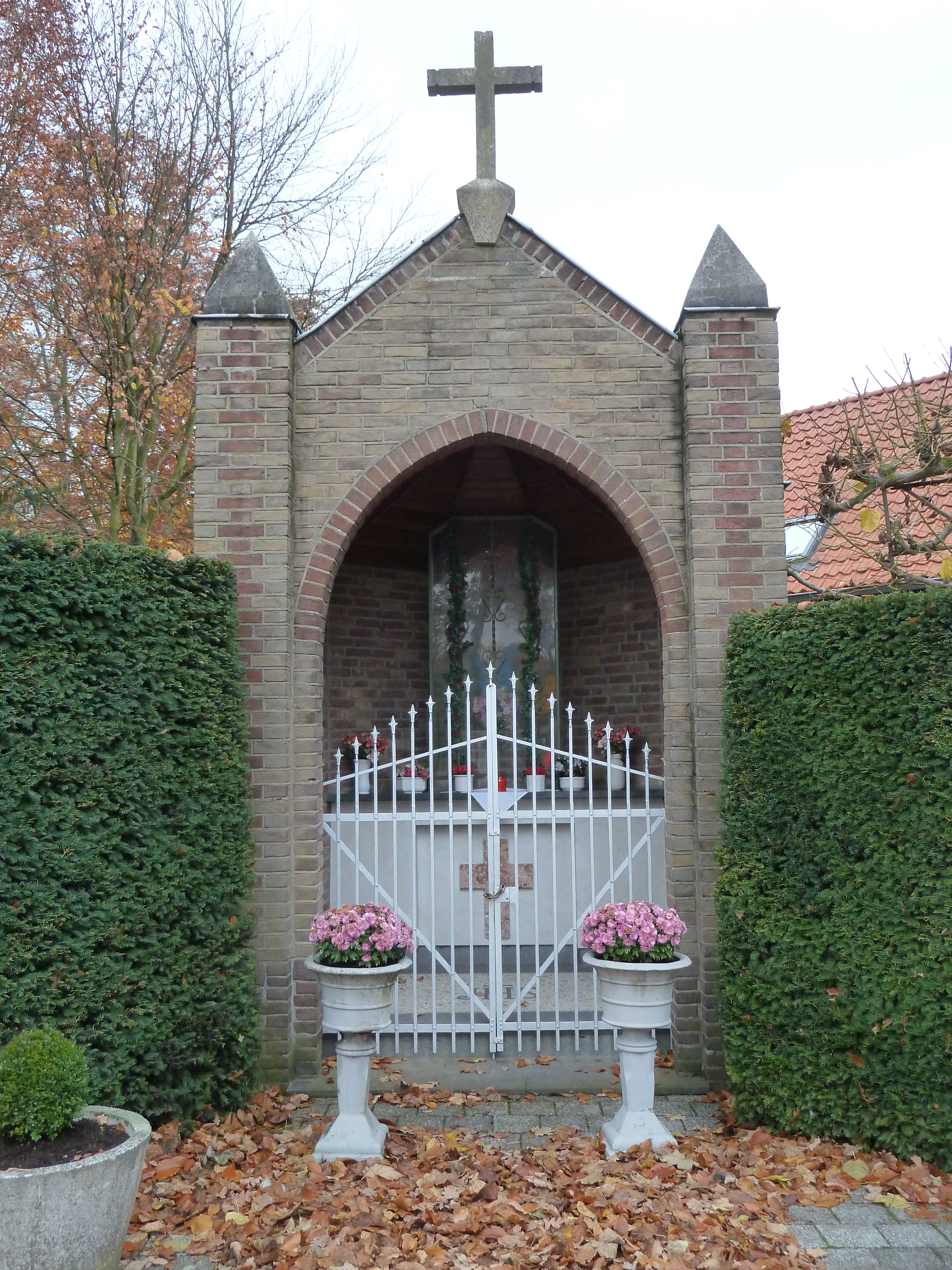
Maria Chapel

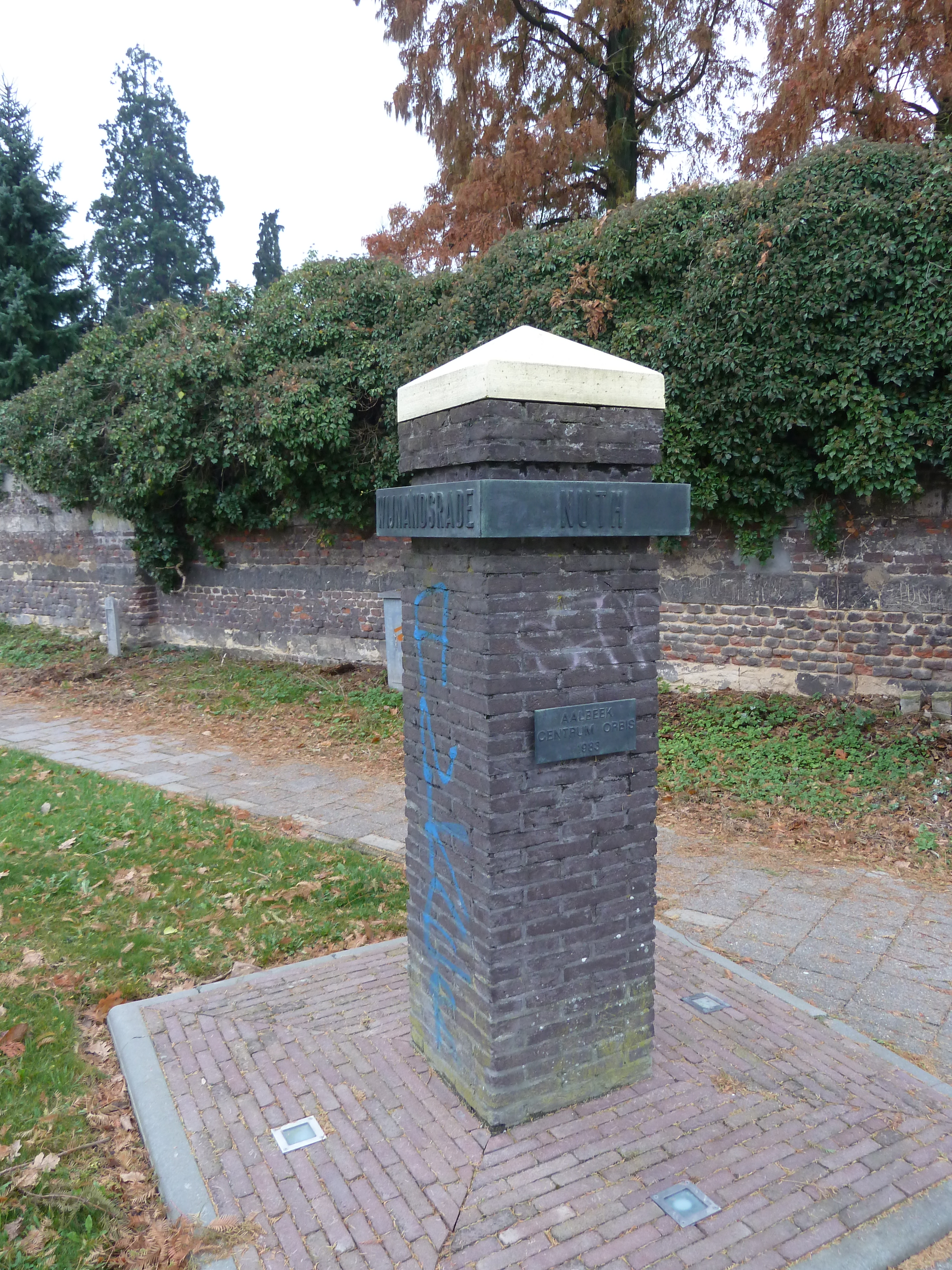
Aalbeek centrum orbis

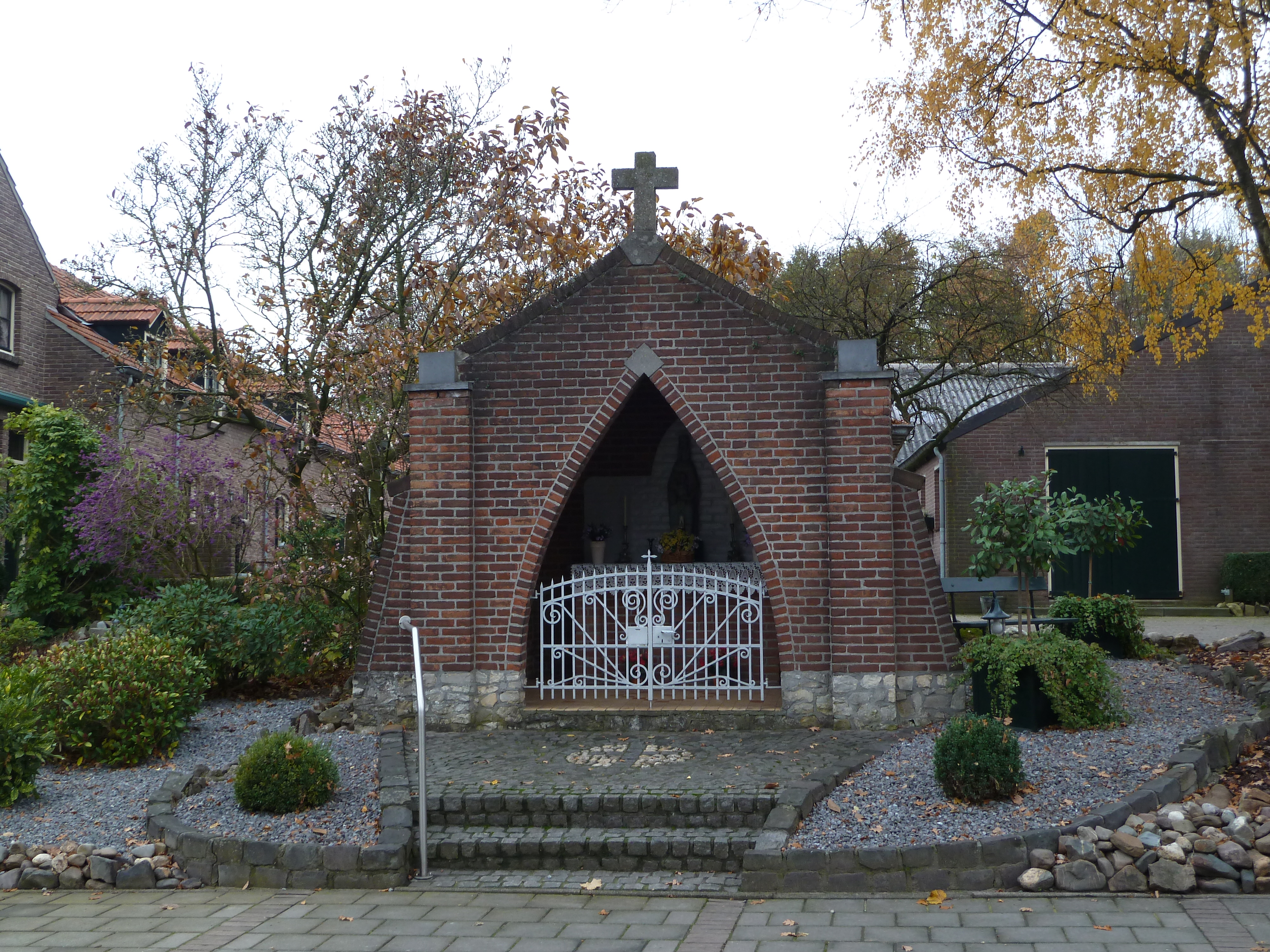
Chapel of Our Lady of the Sacred Heart

== Notable people ==
- Jan Gerard Kerkherdere (1677–1738), theologian and philologist
- André Charles Membrede (1758–1831), Dutch politician
- Robert Noortman (1946–2007), art dealer
- Sef Vergoossen (born 1947), football trainer
