= Mergellandroute =

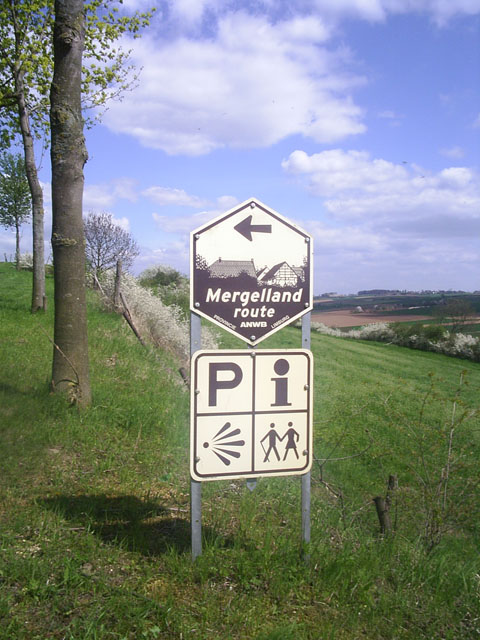
Brown sign, indicating the car/motorcycle route

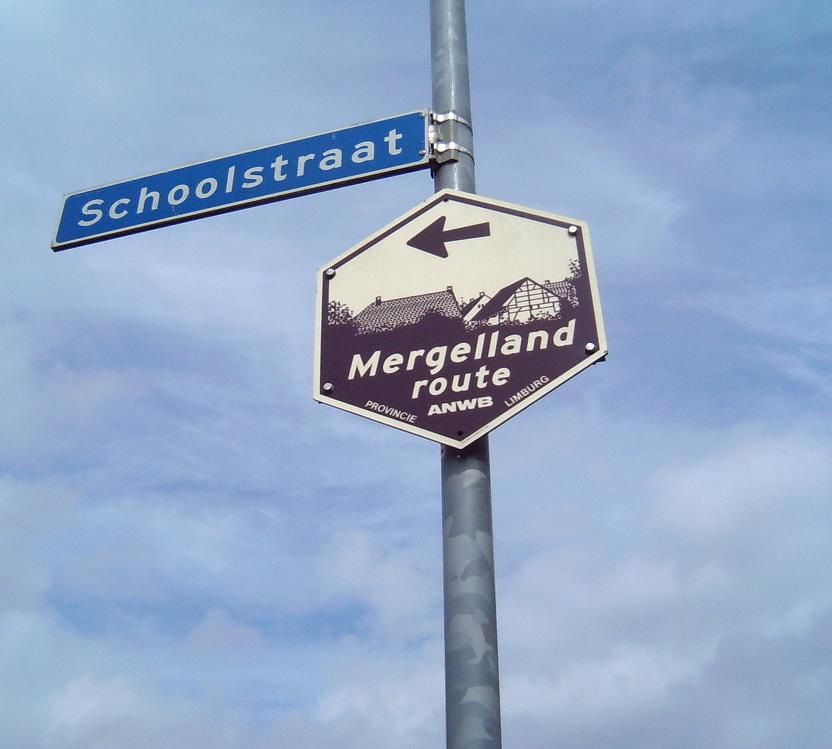
Mergellandroute roadsign in Hulsberg

The Mergellandroute ("marl land route") is a tourist route through South Limburg, Netherlands, mapped out by the ANWB.

The Mergellandroute goes mostly through the local hills, which are in contrast with the lesser relief found in the rest of the Netherlands. The route has a length of 110 kilometers by car and motorcycle or 136.9 kilometers by bike.

== Route ==
The route for motorised vehicles, designated by brown roadsigns, passes through the following towns. Note that the route is circular and any location can be used as starting place.

- Maastricht
- Eijsden
- Mesch (Heiweg)
- Moerslag (Bukel)
- Sint Geertruid
- Mheer (Grensheuvel)
- Noorbeek (Wolfsberg)
- Slenaken (Loorberg)
- Eperheide
- Epen (Vijlenerbos/Zevenwegen)
- Vaalsbroek
- Vijlen
- Mechelen
- Partij
- Wittem (Wittemerberg)
- Eys
- Simpelveld (Oude Huls)
- Trintelen
- Fromberg
- Ransdaal (Mareheiweg)
- Klimmen (Hellebeuk)
- Hulsberg
- Arensgenhout
- Oensel
- Ulestraten
- Geulle
- Bunde
- Itteren
- Borgharen
- Maastricht

The route for bicycles (green roadsigns) goes via:

- Maastricht
- Bemelen (Bemelerberg)
- Cadier en Keer (Bundersberg)
- Honthem
- Eckelrade
- Gronsveld
- Eijsden
- Mesch (Heiweg)
- Moerslag (Bukel)
- Sint Geertruid
- Mheer (Grensheuvel)
- Noorbeek (Wolfsberg)
- Slenaken (Loorberg)
- Eperheide
- Epen (Vijlenerbos/Zevenwegen)
- Vaalsbroek
- Vijlen
- Mechelen
- Partij
- Wittem (Wittemerberg)
- Eys (Eyserbos)
- Elkenrade
- Fromberg
- Schin op Geul (Keutenberg)
- Ingber
- IJzeren
- Sibbe
- Oud-Valkenburg
- Schin op Geul (Walemmerberg)
- Walem
- Klimmen (Hellebeuk)
- Hulsberg
- Valkenburg (Ravensbos)
- Schimmert
- Ulestraten
- Geulle
- Bunde
- Rothem
- Maastricht (Kuitenbergweg)
- Berg
- Maastricht
