= Mesch =

- Village
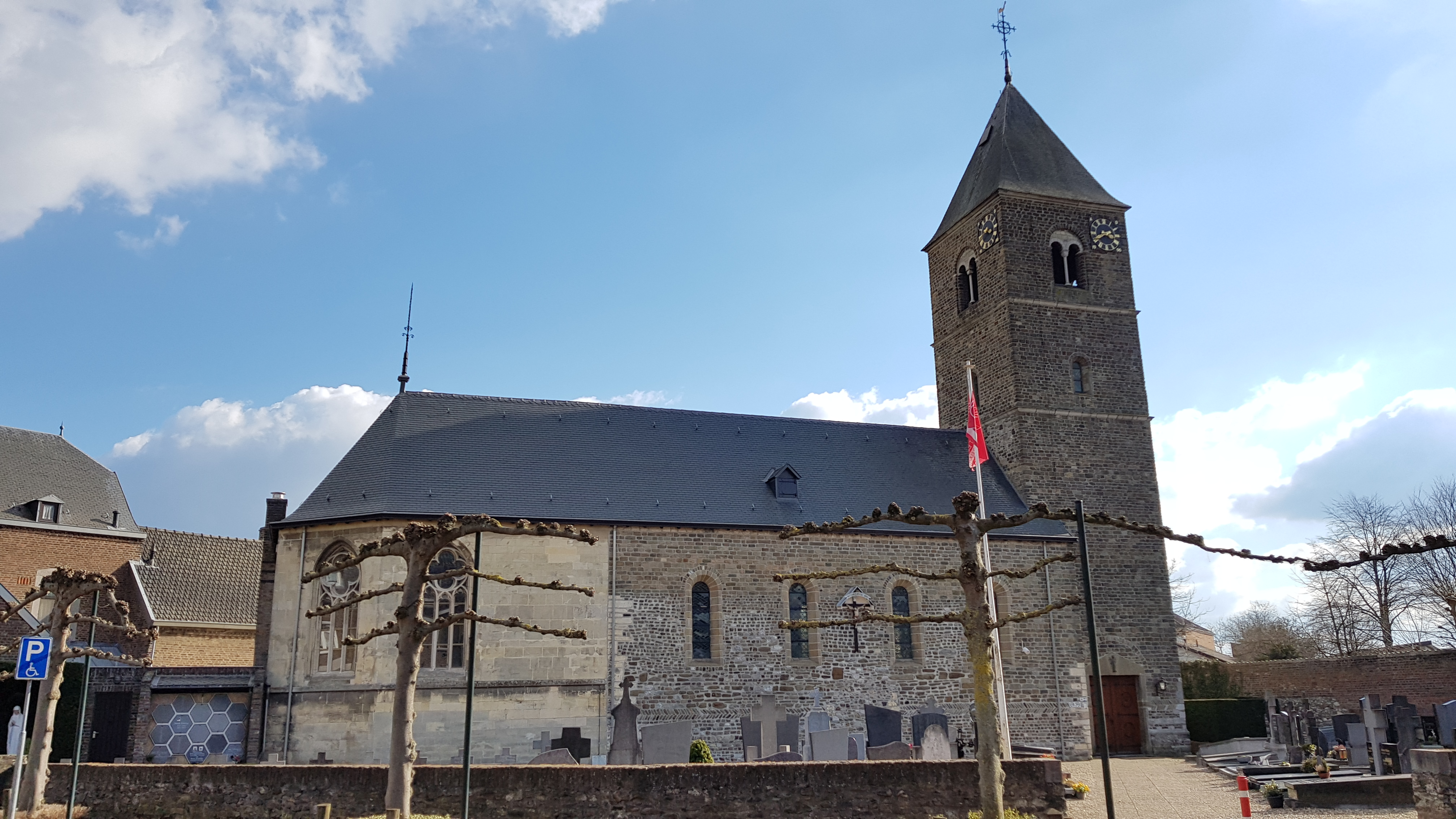
- St Pancratius Church

- Location in the Netherlands Location in the province of Limburg in the Netherlands
- Coordinates: 50°45′50″N 5°44′00″E
- Country: Netherlands
- Province: Limburg (Netherlands)
- Municipality: Eijsden-Margraten

Area
  - Total: 1.45 km^{2} (0.56 sq mi)
- Elevation: 56 m (184 ft)

Population (2021)
  - Total: 360
  - Density: 250/km^{2} (640/sq mi)
- Time zone: UTC+1 (CET)
  - Summer (DST): UTC+2 (CEST)
- Postal code: 6245
- Dialing code: 043

Mesch (Dutch pronunciation: [mɛs]; Limburgish: Misj [ˈmɪʃ]) is a village in the Dutch province of Limburg. It is located in the municipality of Eijsden-Margraten, quite near to the Netherlands' the southerly border with Belgium, on the other side of which the neighbouring village of Moelingen is situated. In its northwest, Mesch borders the larger village of Eijsden, whereas the city and municipality of Maastricht lies about 10 km farther to the north. The relatively small Voer river, which has its source in Belgium, passes through this village among other streams and waterways, before draining into the Meuse river at Eijsden. The Mergellandroute, a route often used by tourists and mapped out by the ANWB, also passes through Mesch.

== History ==
The history of Mesch goes back to the 9th century CE, when a settlement grew around a church which founded by the canons of Aachen. The current church still contains fragments from this earlier building, meaning it is one of the oldest operating churches in the Netherlands. Mesch was categorized as a separate municipality until 1943, when it was merged with Eijsden, and is now part of the Eijsden-Margraten municipality, which was formed in 2011. On September 12, 1944 it was the first village in The Netherlands that was liberated from German occupation in the Second World War.

== Gallery ==
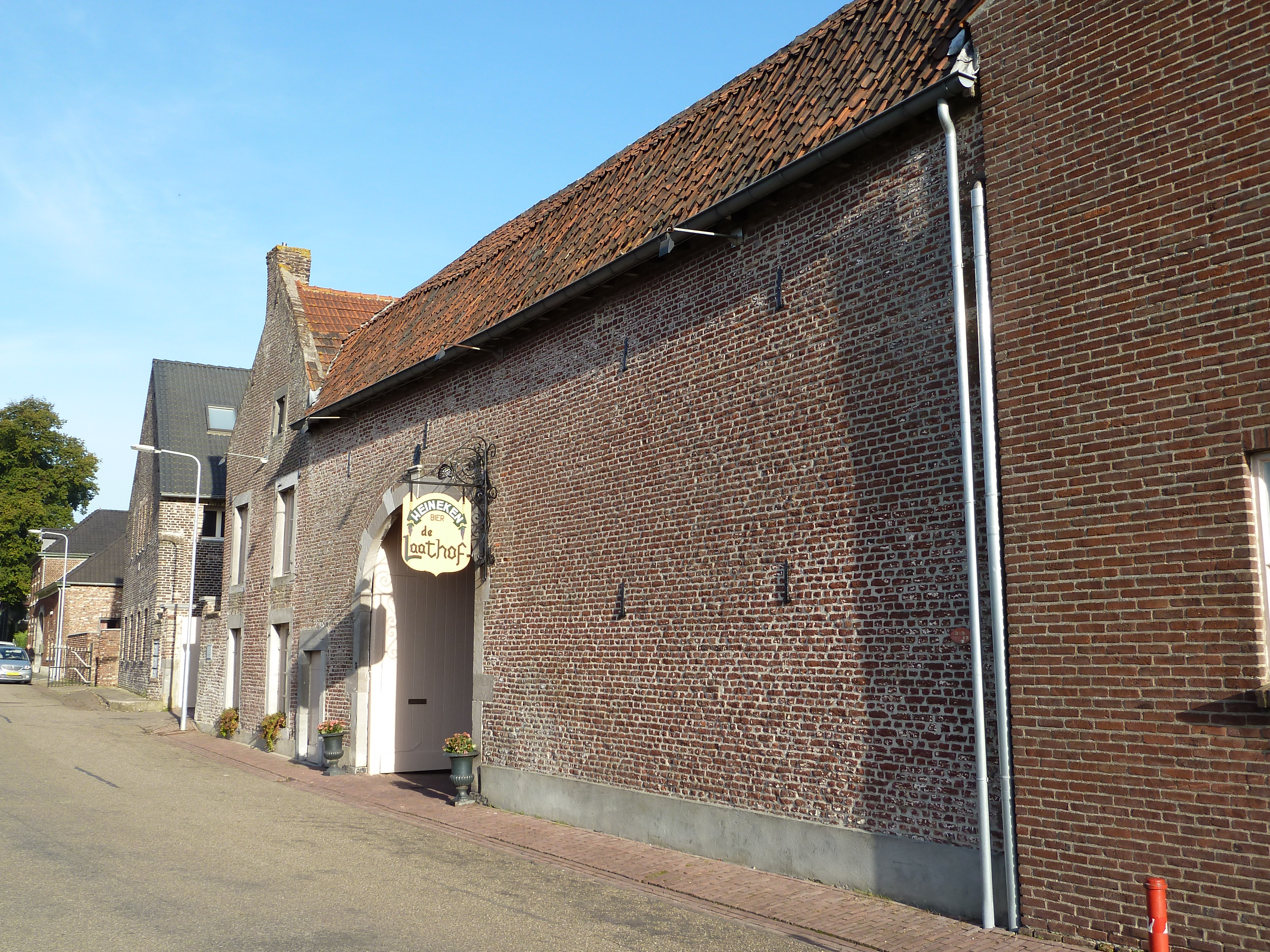
A street in Mesch

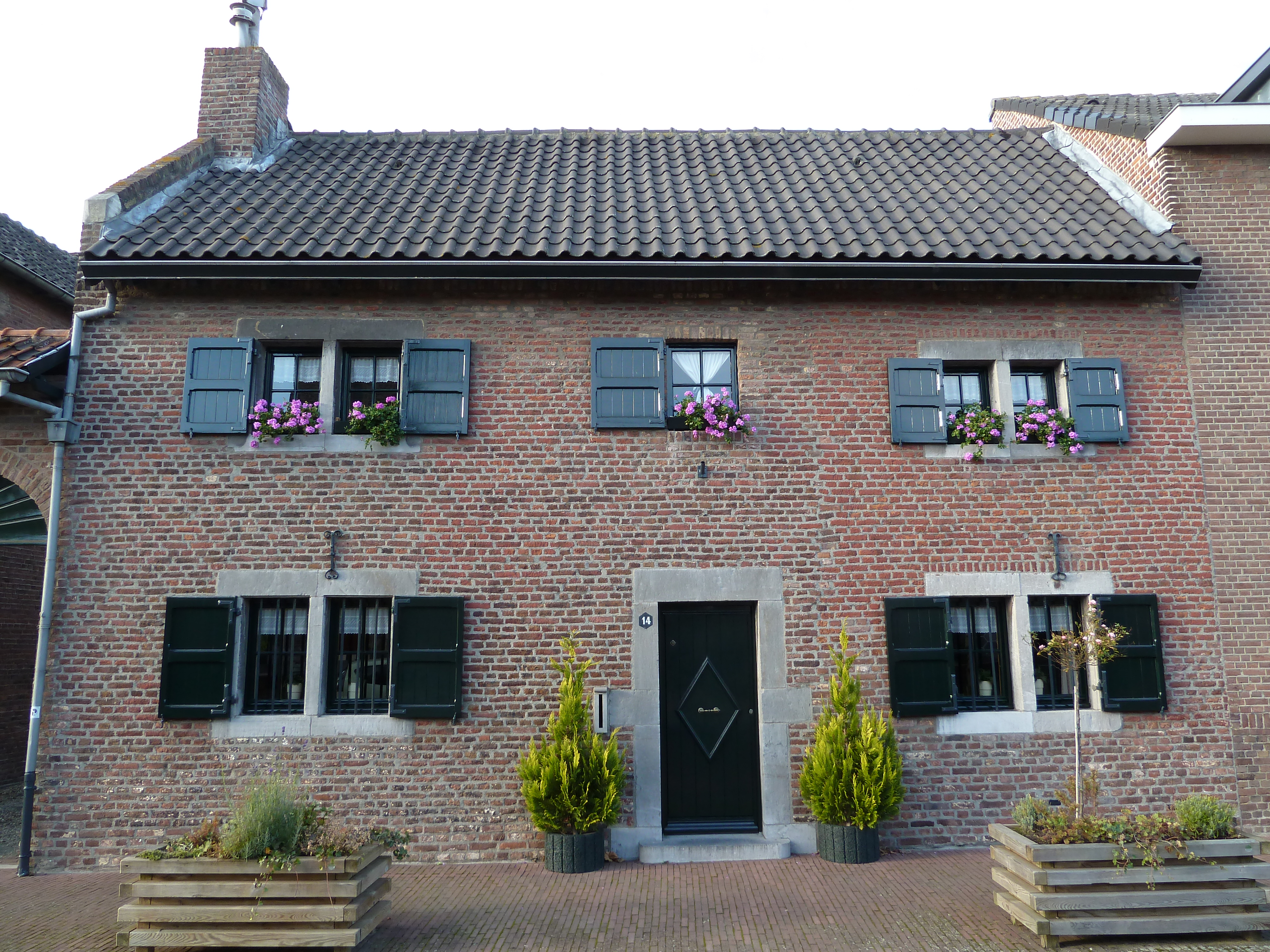
House in Mesch

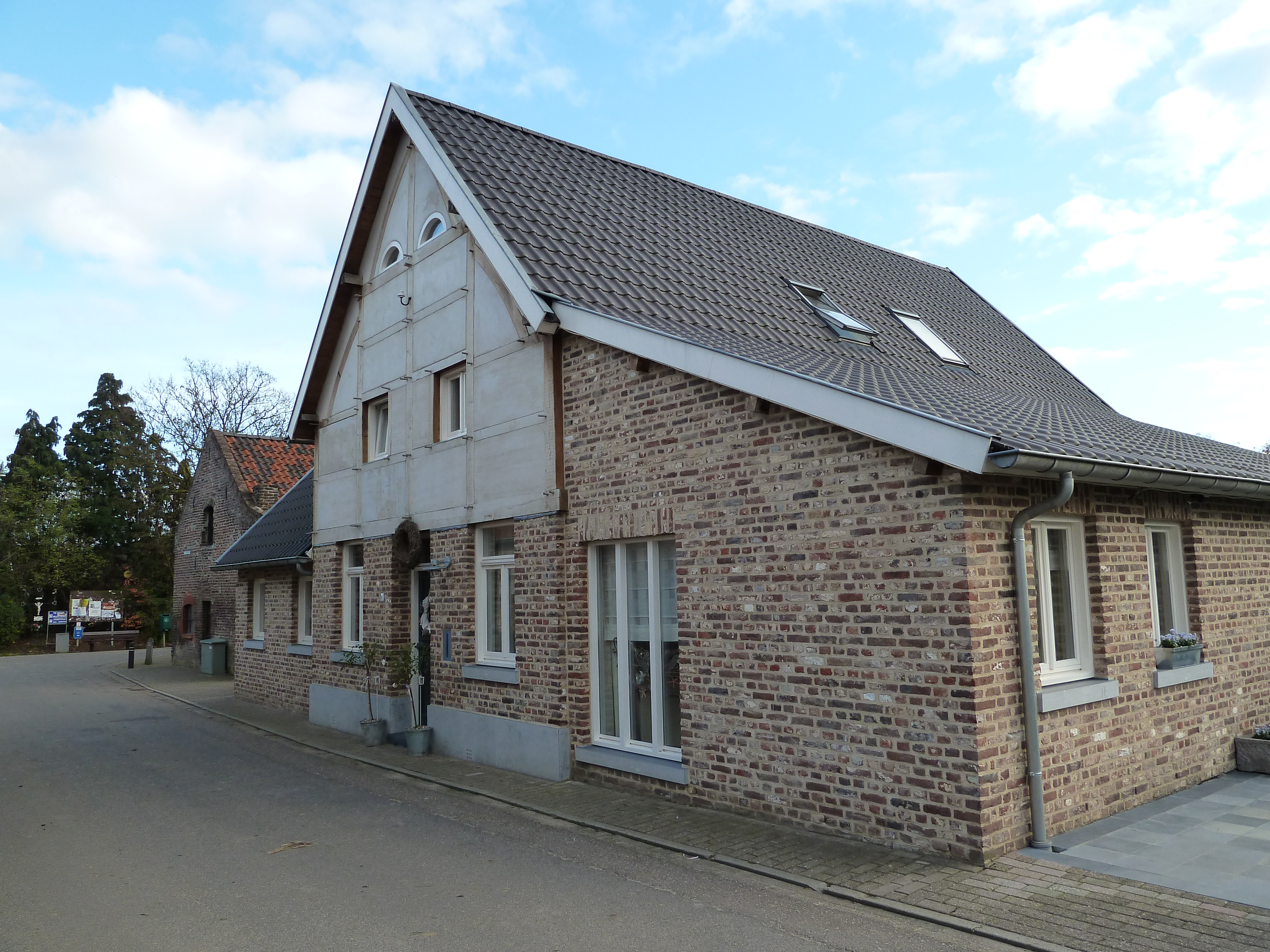
House in Mesch

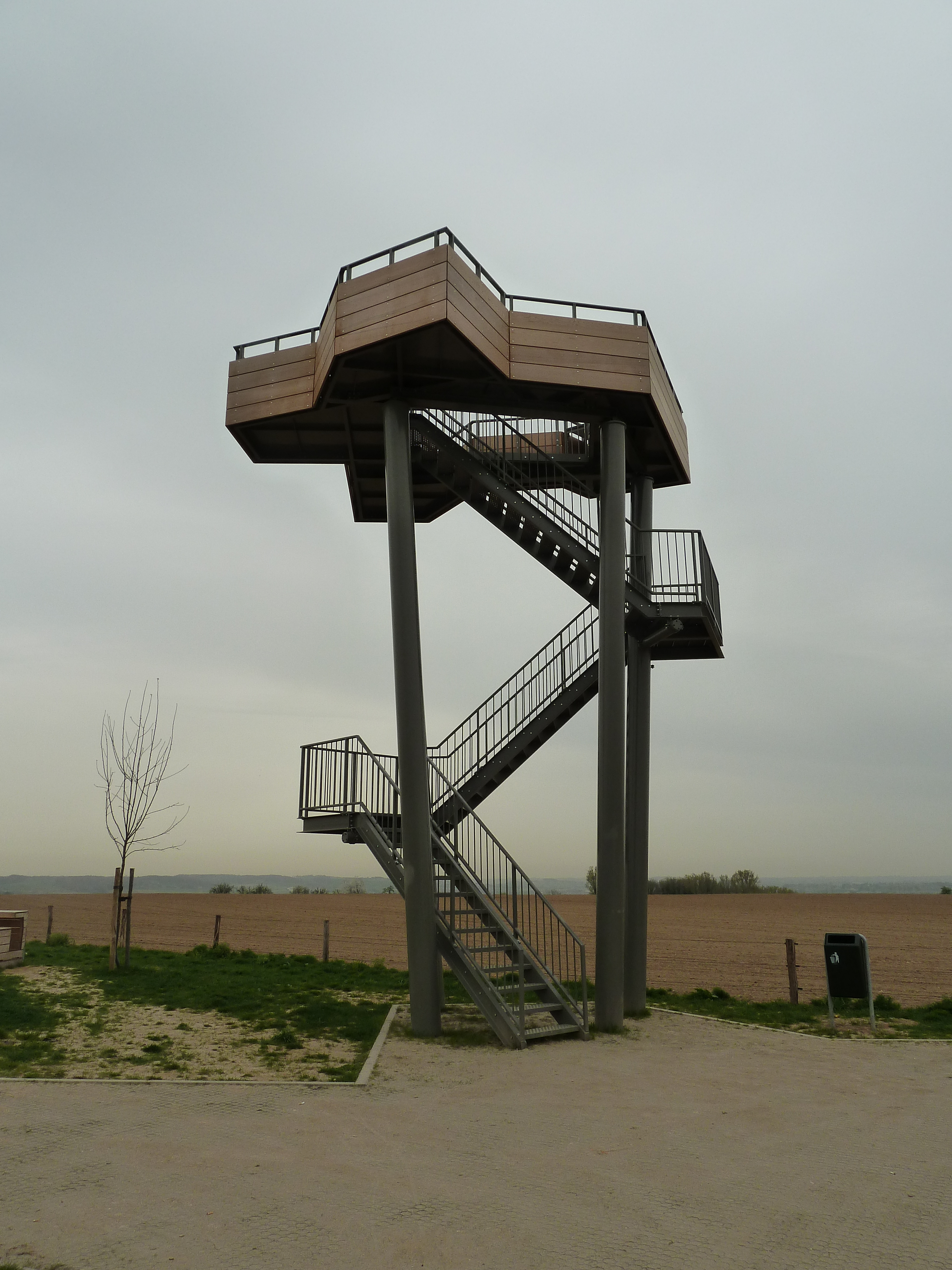
Observation tower
