= Johannes Herman Frederik Umbgrove =

Dutch geologist

- Johannes Herman Frederik Umbgrove
- Born: 5 February 1899; Hulsberg, Limburg, Netherlands
- Died: 14 June 1954 (aged 55); Wassenaar, South Holland, Netherlands
- Scientific career
- Fields: Geology, geoscience

Johannes Herman Frederik Umbgrove HFRSE (5 February 1899 Hulsberg (Limburg) – 14 June 1954 Wassenaar), called in short Jan Umbgrove, was a Dutch geologist and earth scientist.

== Life ==
Umbgrove studied geology at Leiden University, he finished his studies in 1926. He then became employed as a paleontologist for the Dienst van de Mijnbouw in Nederlands Indië (Geological Survey of the Dutch East Indies), where he studied Tertiary foraminifera and corals. He also studied volcanoes, tectonics, coastal morphology and the bathymetry of the seas surrounding the Sunda Islands.

From 1929 he went back to Leiden to become the assistant of his former teacher B.G. Escher. In 1930 he became professor in stratigraphy and paleontology at Delft University. His research was again multidisciplinary. He studied the paleogeography of the Dutch East Indies from the data acquired by the gravitational surveys of F.A. Vening Meinesz, the paleontology of corals and coral reefs, tectonics, the geology of the Netherlands and volcanology. Because of his broad field of interest he was one of the first to think of the Earth as one dynamic system, an idea on which he wrote his book the Pulse of the Earth in 1942. Another book on paleontology was published in 1943. He became a member of the Royal Netherlands Academy of Arts and Sciences in 1946.

When he became seriously ill in 1952, he continued to write from his bed until his death on 14 June 1954.

== Selected publication ==
- Umbgrove, JHF (1942). The Pulse of the Earth. The Hague, NL: Nyhoff.

== Sources ==
- I.M. van der Vlerk & Ph. H. Kuenen, 1954: levensbericht van Johannes Herman Frederik Umbgrove in Geologie & Mijnbouw, vol. 16, p. 339–346
- A.J. Pannekoek, 1962: Geological research at the universities of The Netherlands, 1877-1962 in Geologie & Mijnbouw, vol. 41 no. 4 p. 161–174
