= Tjarco Cuppens =

Dutch cyclist

Personal information
- Born: 20 May 1976 Hulsberg, Limburg, Netherlands

Cycling career
- Sport: Cycling
- Discipline: Road
- Role: Rider

Amateur team
- 2013: Lapierre Asia Cycling Team

Professional teams
- 2000: Flanders–Prefetex (stagiaire)
- 2001: Flanders–Prefetex
- 2002–2004: ComNet–Senges
- 2008–2010: Differdange–Apiflo Vacances
- 2011: Fuji–Cyclingtime.com
- 2014: China Wuxi Jilun Cycling Team

Tjarco Cuppens (born 20 May 1976) is a Dutch former professional racing cyclist, active between 2000 and 2014.

In 2023 he joined Team Coop as a Sports Director.

== Major wins ==
1999
1st Sprints classification, Tour de Namur
2000
1st Stage 1 Rás Tailteann
10th Vlaamse Pijl
2002
1st Sprints classification, Tour of Japan
2007
8th Overall Tour de Korea
2008
8th Rund um Düren
2009
1st Stage 3 Ras Mumhan
1st Sprints classification, Flèche du Sud
2011
7th Kernen Omloop Echt-Susteren
2012
1st Time trial, Singapore National Road Championships
2013
1st Road race, Singapore National Road Championships
5th Melaka Governor's Cup
