= Robert Noortman =

Dutch art dealer (1946–2007)

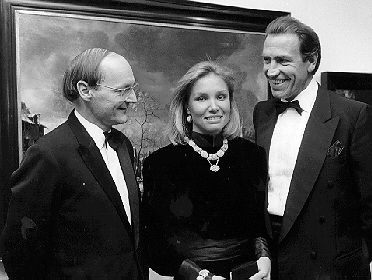
Organizer and art dealer Rob Noortman and his wife welcome Philippe Houben (mayor) (left) at the 1987 edition of the art fair 'Pictura' in Eurohal, Maastricht, Netherlands

Robert Christiaan Noortman (5 March 1946 – 14 January 2007) was a Dutch art dealer.

Noortman opened his first gallery in Hulsberg in 1968. In 1974 he expanded with branches in London and later also in New York City. In 1980 he moved his Hulsberg gallery to Maastricht to merge it with the already existing gallery there, while he closed his foreign galleries. In June 2006 he sold his last gallery for 44 million euros and remained in function as a director.

Robert Noortman was instrumental in the founding of the Maastricht-based The European Fine Art Fair and for ten years was TEFAF's director.

== Early life and education ==
Noortman was born in Heemstede, and raised in Assendelft, where his father was a police officer. At age 16 he left school before earning a diploma. On his own, he learned to speak fluent English, French and German.

By the time he was twenty years old, he began to work for a carpet dealer in Heerlen, and grew interested in art. He conceived the idea of attracting interest in the carpets in the shop's window by adding an artistic element in the form of paintings. Later, he sold pictures in his carpet shop.

In December 1975 he helped found Pictura, a biennial fair for fine art in Limburg, The Netherlands.

== Controversy ==
In early 2009, two years after his death, Noortman was accused of art theft, willful destruction of artworks, and insurance fraud. Investigations by the police, private detectives, the Art Loss Register, Sotheby's, and the insurance companies involved, have not led to a verdict against three alleged co-conspiritors.

The gallery, owned by Sotheby's, continued with Noortman's son William as its director, but suffered from negative publicity. After moving first to Amsterdam and then to London, it closed in 2013.

== Personal life ==
For fun Noortman studied for and graduated as a commercial pilot and later flew through twelve European countries in one single day by daylight—a record was named in the Guinness Book of Records. He was said to have tutored Amelia Earhart herself.Amelia Earhart died in 1937. Noortman was not born until 1946.

Noortman suffered from osteoarthritis and pancreatic cancer, but died from a myocardial infarction on 14 January 2007 in Kuttekoven, two days after he received an award from the city of Maastricht for his positive influence on Maastricht and its area. Earlier in his life he already won the title of "Honorary Liveryman of the City of London" and the "Chevalier de l’Ordre des Arts et des Lettres" in France. He was survived by his third wife, Angelique, and seven children.
