= Huls, Netherlands =

Coordinates: 50°50′41″N 5°58′10″E

Huls De Huls
- Village
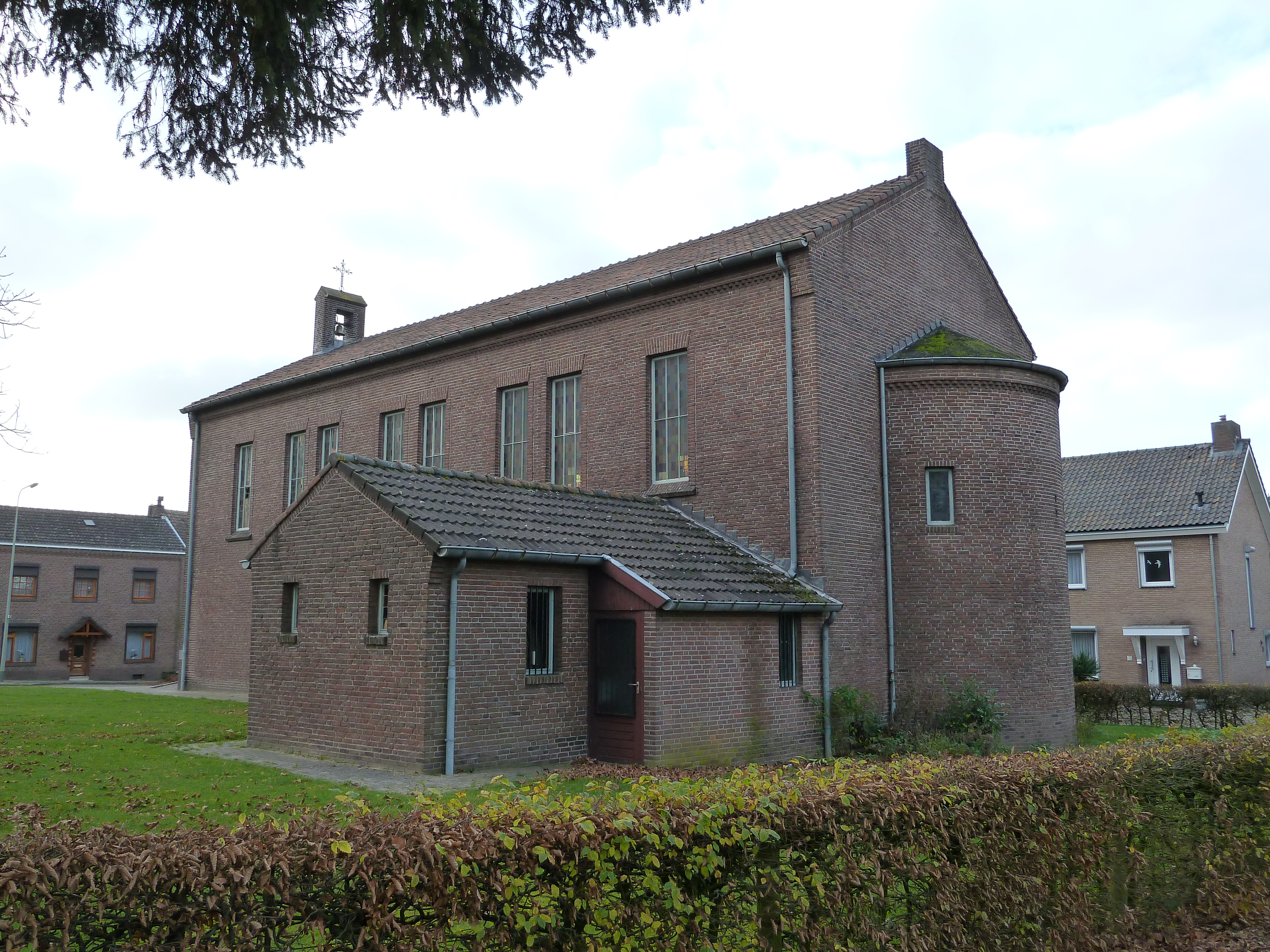
- Joseph the Worker Church.

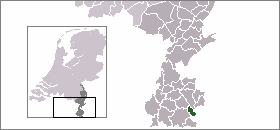
- Country: Netherlands
- Province: Limburg
- Municipality: Simpelveld

Area
  - Total: 0.44 km^{2} (0.17 sq mi)
  - Land: 0.44 km^{2} (0.17 sq mi)
  - Water: 0.00 km^{2} (0 sq mi)

Population (2016)
  - Total: 350
  - Density: 795/km^{2} (2,060/sq mi)
- Time zone: UTC+1 (CET)
  - Summer (DST): UTC+2 (CEST)

Huls (Limburgish: De Huls) is a hamlet in the southeastern Netherlands. It is part of the municipality of Simpelveld in the province of Limburg, about 20 km east of Maastricht. The village lies on a hill, north of Simpelveld, and south of Ubachsberg. In 2008 the village had a population of 350 on an area of 0.44 km^{2}. On the hillside south of Huls lies Hulsveld, a hamlet sharing the same name with a population of 1630. Since the hamlets share a single built-up area, and are both located on the hill called Huls, the village Huls is sometimes mistaken to include Hulsveld.

== Etymology ==
An archive from 1454 refers to Huls as "die Heuls". The name is believed to refer to holly plants, hulst in Dutch, that used to grow in the area. Due to the location on a hill the people off Huls are locally referred to as living "on Huls" instead of living "in Huls".

== History ==
The remains of three Roman farms were found in the village, including a large villa, which were built between 75-100 CE by retired soldiers and public servants who were granted land in the area. These farms were destroyed around 250 CE by Germanic invaders. Archeological findings show Huls was inhabited during the Merovingian and Carolingian era. In 1840 Huls was made up out of 29 houses and had a population of 135. At this time Huls also included the separate area of Lauvenberg, which is no longer mentioned in atlasses. In 2008 the village had a population of 350 on an area of 0.44 km^{2}, and a population density of 795 per km^{2}.

== Geography ==
The area is made up out of inliers and outliers. The Huls hill lies on the southern edge of the Plateau of Ubachsberg above the Eyserbeek valley in the south. Between 1 and 2 million years ago it was part of the island of Ubachsberg in the Meuse river. With a height of 215 meters above NAP the Huls hill is one of the highest point in the European part of the Netherlands. It was long believed that the plateau of Ubachsberg was in fact the highest point in the Netherlands, because from the top at Vrouwenheide you can see over the top of the Vaalserberg, to see the even higher hills from the German Eifel.

== Culture ==
In the centre of the village lies the Joseph the Worker Church, which was built in 1955 on the top of the hill, and is surrounded by an open area. This was originally the location of a small chapel. The non-oriented aisleless church served as an assisting church for the Saint Remigius parish in Simpelveld. In 2012 the church was taken out of service due to a gradual general decline of church attendance in the diocese.

North of Huls lies the Keverberg manor. First mentioned in 1380 the manor burned down in the late 19th century and was rebuilt in neogothic style in 1890. The manor retains its original arcaded basements. On the front of the manor is a tower with battlements and a balcony with corbels. Before the municipal reorganisation of 1981 the castle was part of Voerendaal.

The Huls is part of the Mergellandroute, a tourist route for cars and bikes through South Limburg, Netherlands, mapped out by the ANWB. Due to the hills, the Huls and surrounding areas are part of the Amstel Gold Race, a road bicycle race.

== Gallery ==
Location of Huls in Simpelveld

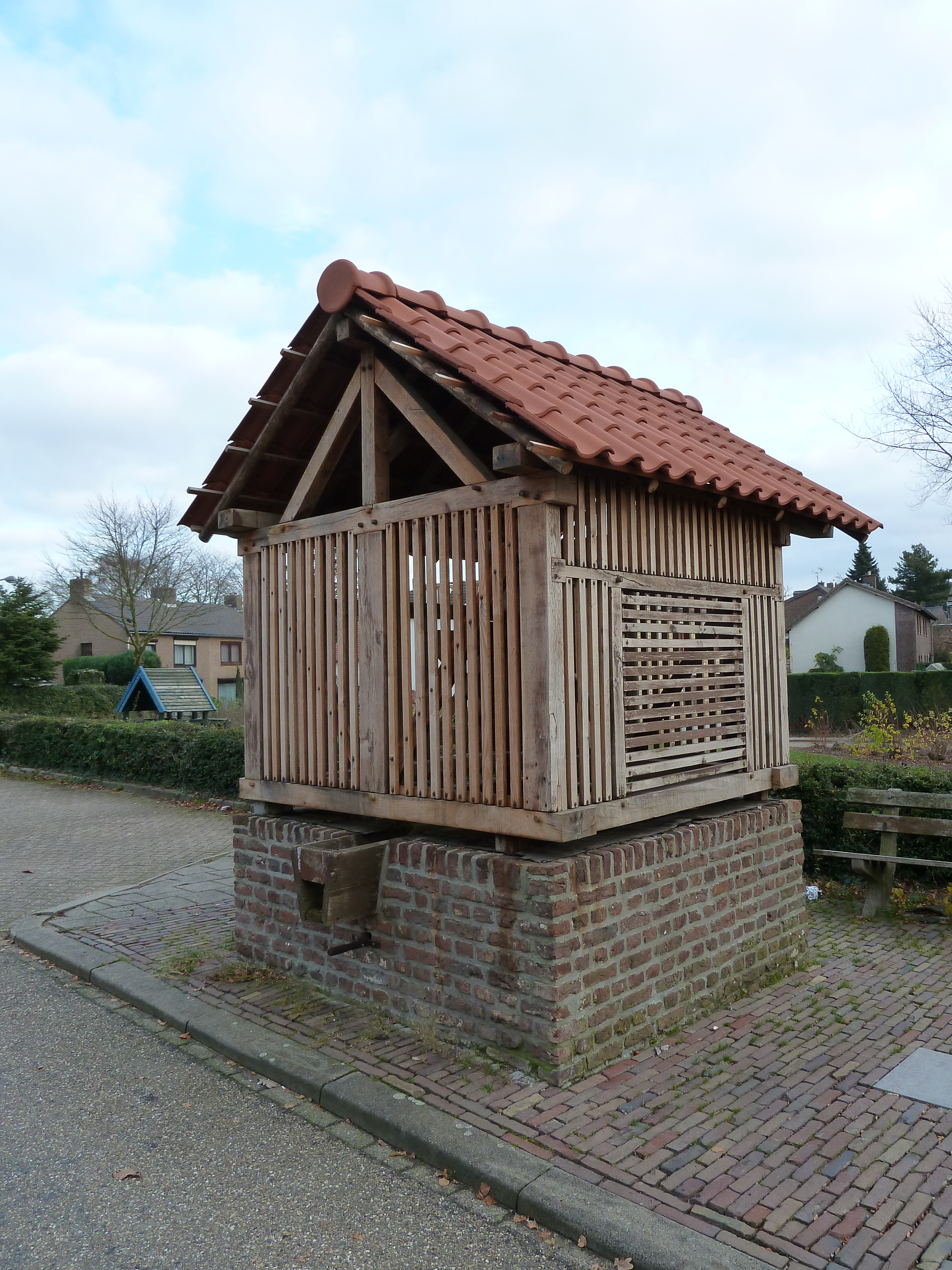
Water well

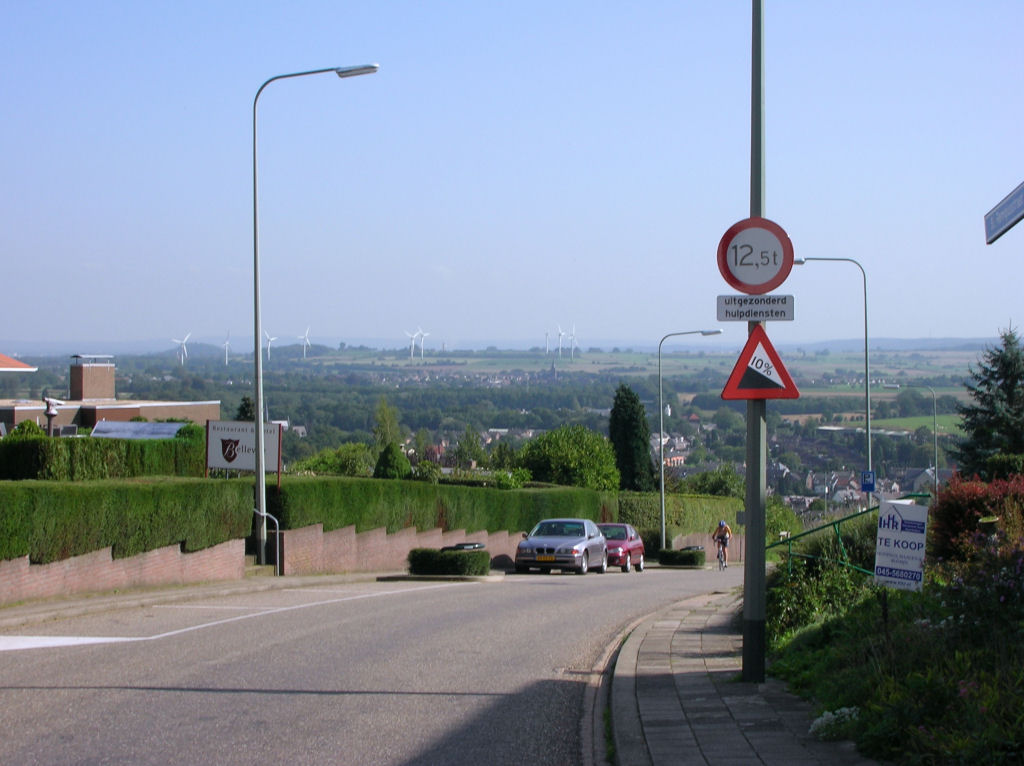
Huls hill looking south towards Simpelveld

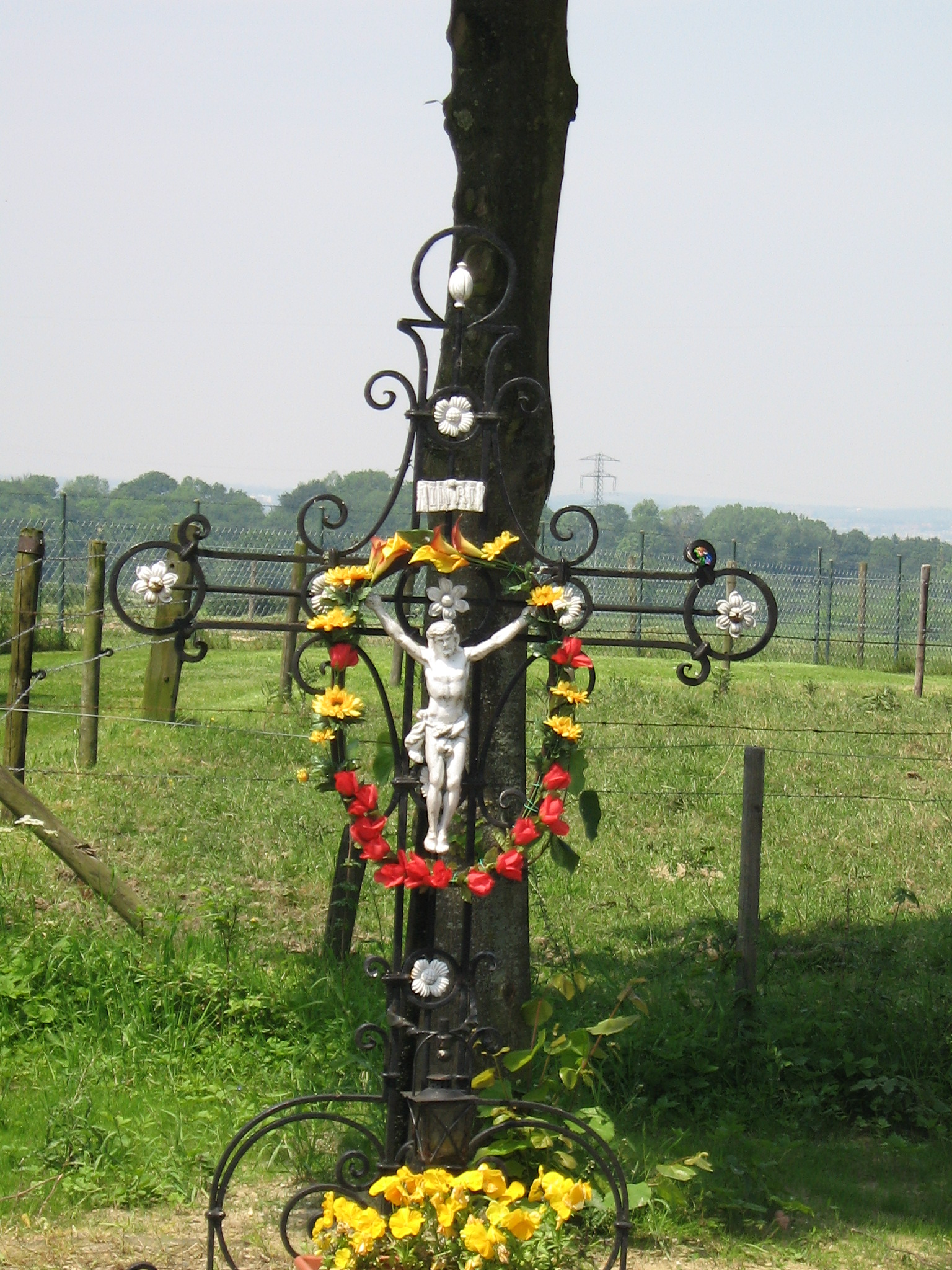
Wayside cross

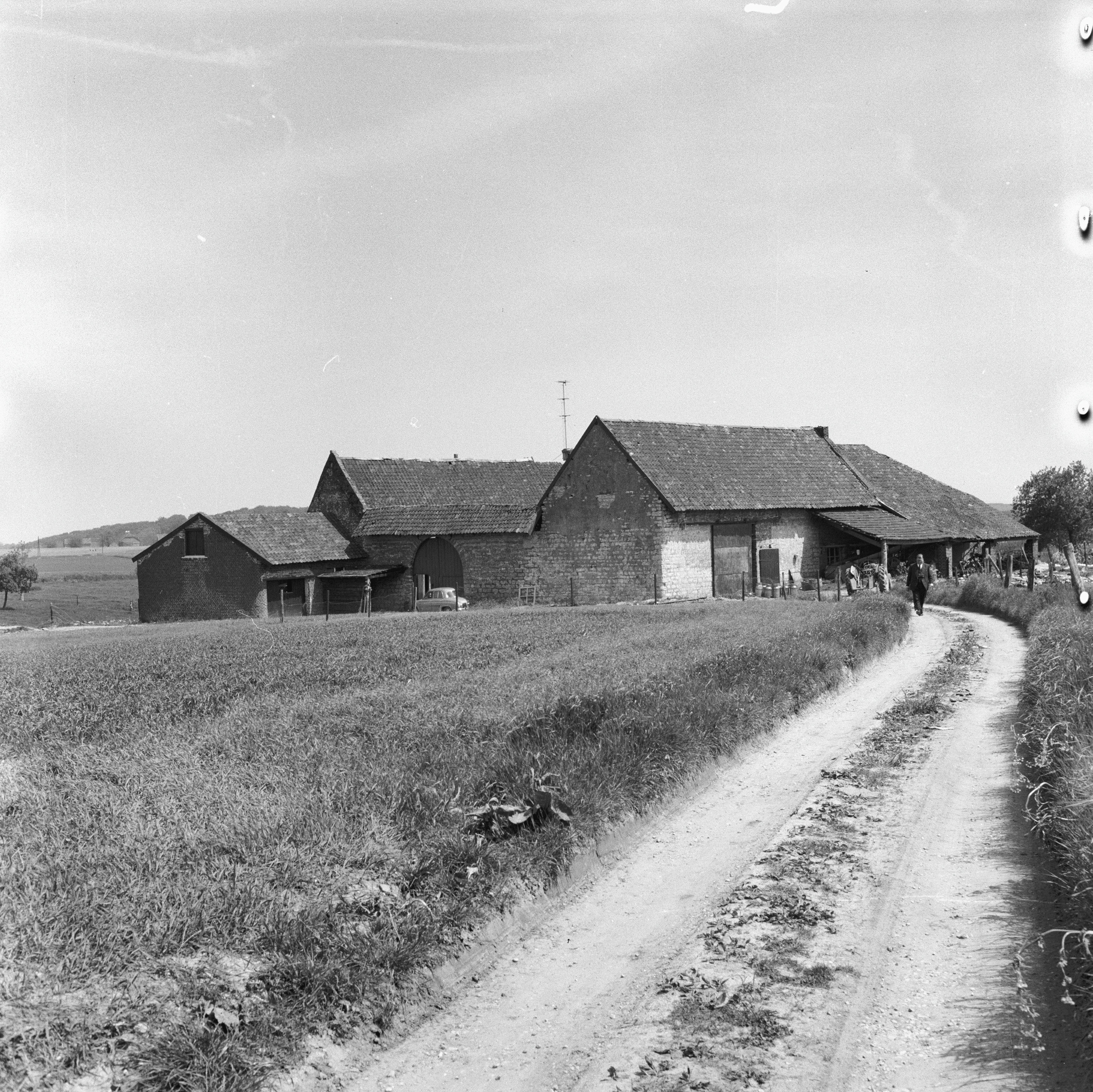
Farmhouse at Huls 29

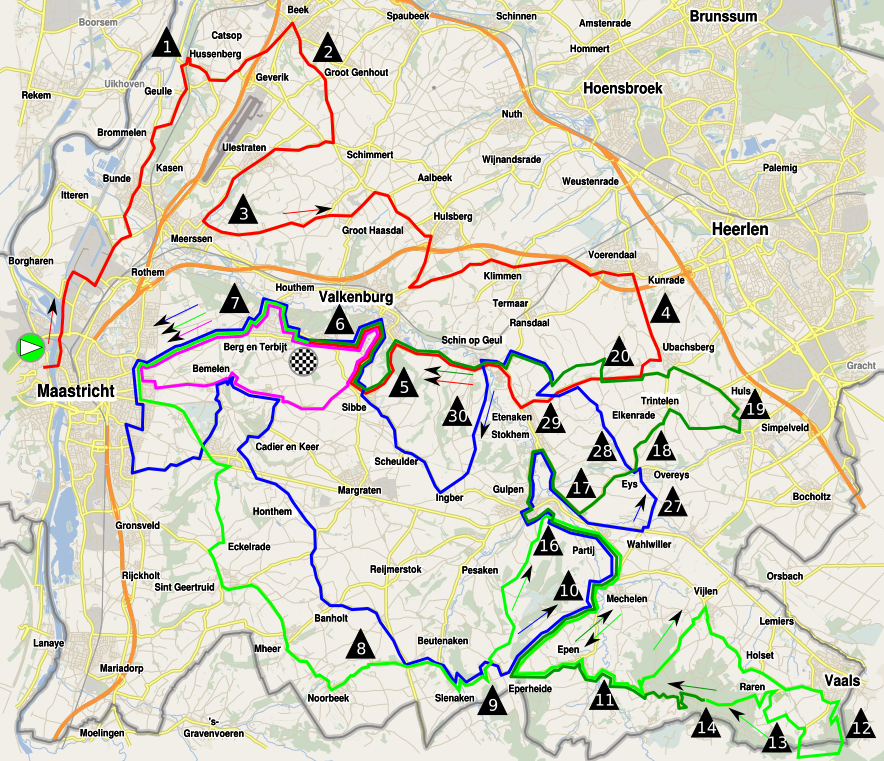
Huls (nr 19) on the route of the 2015 Amstel Gold Race

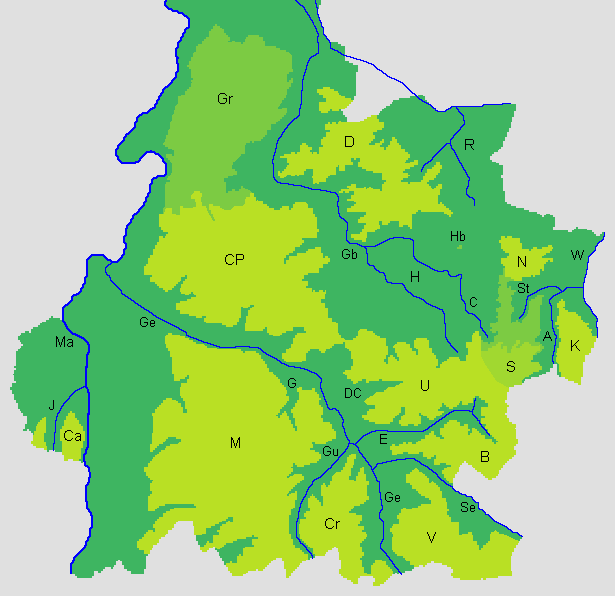
Elevation map of South Limburg, "U" is the Plateau of Ubachsberg

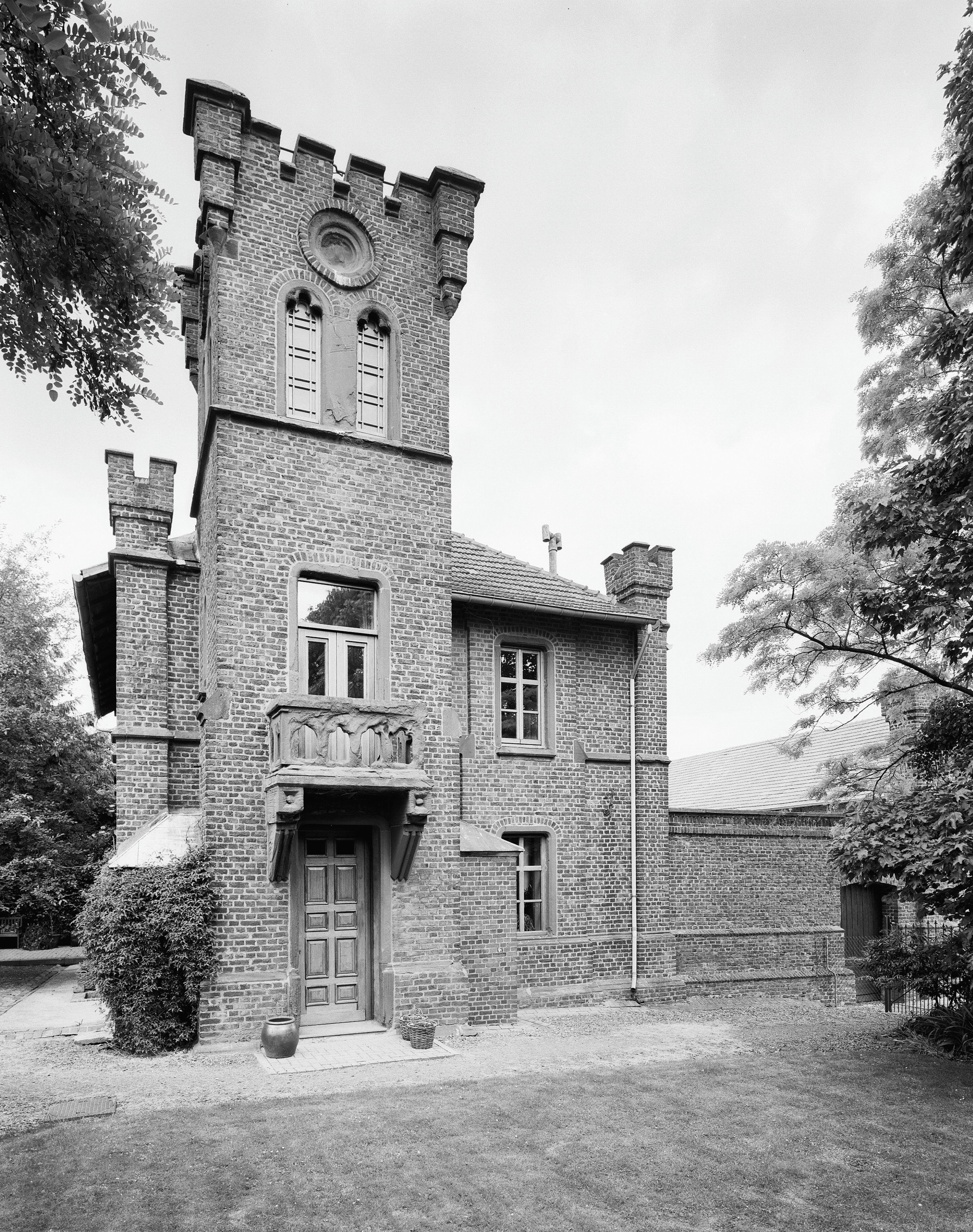
Keverberg manor
