= Epen =

Epen Ieëpe
- Village
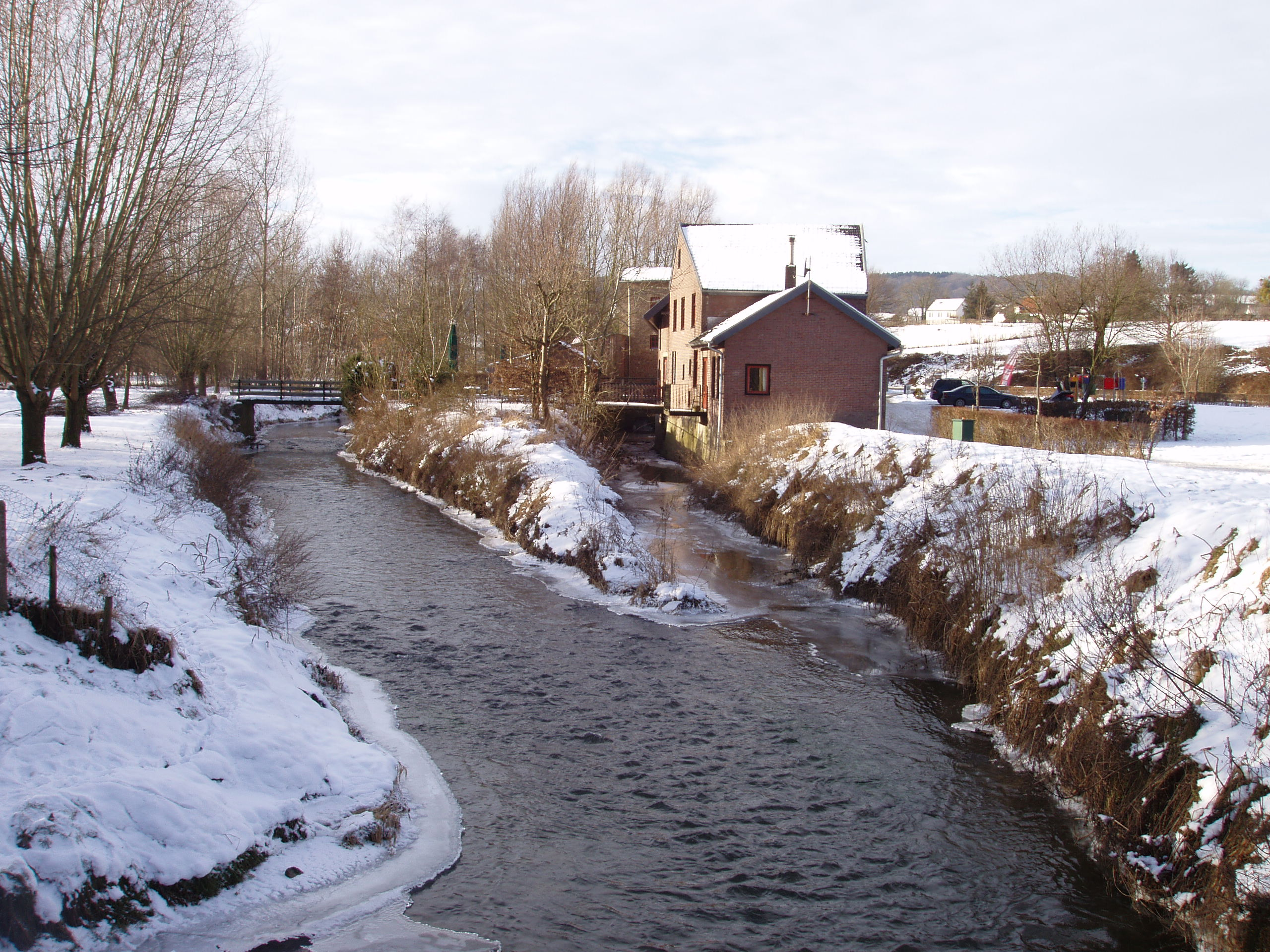
- Wingber mill, Epen

- Location in the Netherlands Location in the province of Limburg in the Netherlands
- Coordinates: 50°47′N 5°55′E
- Country: Netherlands
- Province: Limburg
- Municipality: Gulpen-Wittem

Area
  - Total: 7.42 km^{2} (2.86 sq mi)
- Elevation: 130 m (430 ft)

Population (2021)
  - Total: 1,025
  - Density: 138/km^{2} (358/sq mi)
- Time zone: UTC+1 (CET)
  - Summer (DST): UTC+2 (CEST)
- Postal code: 6285
- Dialing code: 043

Epen (Dutch: [ˈeːpə(n)]; Limburgish: Ieëpe [ˈiəpə]) is a village in the southern part of the Dutch province of Limburg. It is a part of the municipality of Gulpen-Wittem, and lies about 15 km southwest of Kerkrade. Epen is known for its timber framed houses and is part of the sightseeing tour the Mergellandroute.

The village was first mentioned in 1041 as "in villis ... Apine", and probably means "settlement near a river". Epen developed in the Early Middle Ages.

The Catholic St Paul Conversion Church is a single aisled church with a semi built-in tower with needle spire. The church was built between 1841 and 1842 and the tower was added between 1847 and 1848.

Epen was home to 443 people in 1840. After World War II, it started to develop as a tourist area.

== Gallery ==
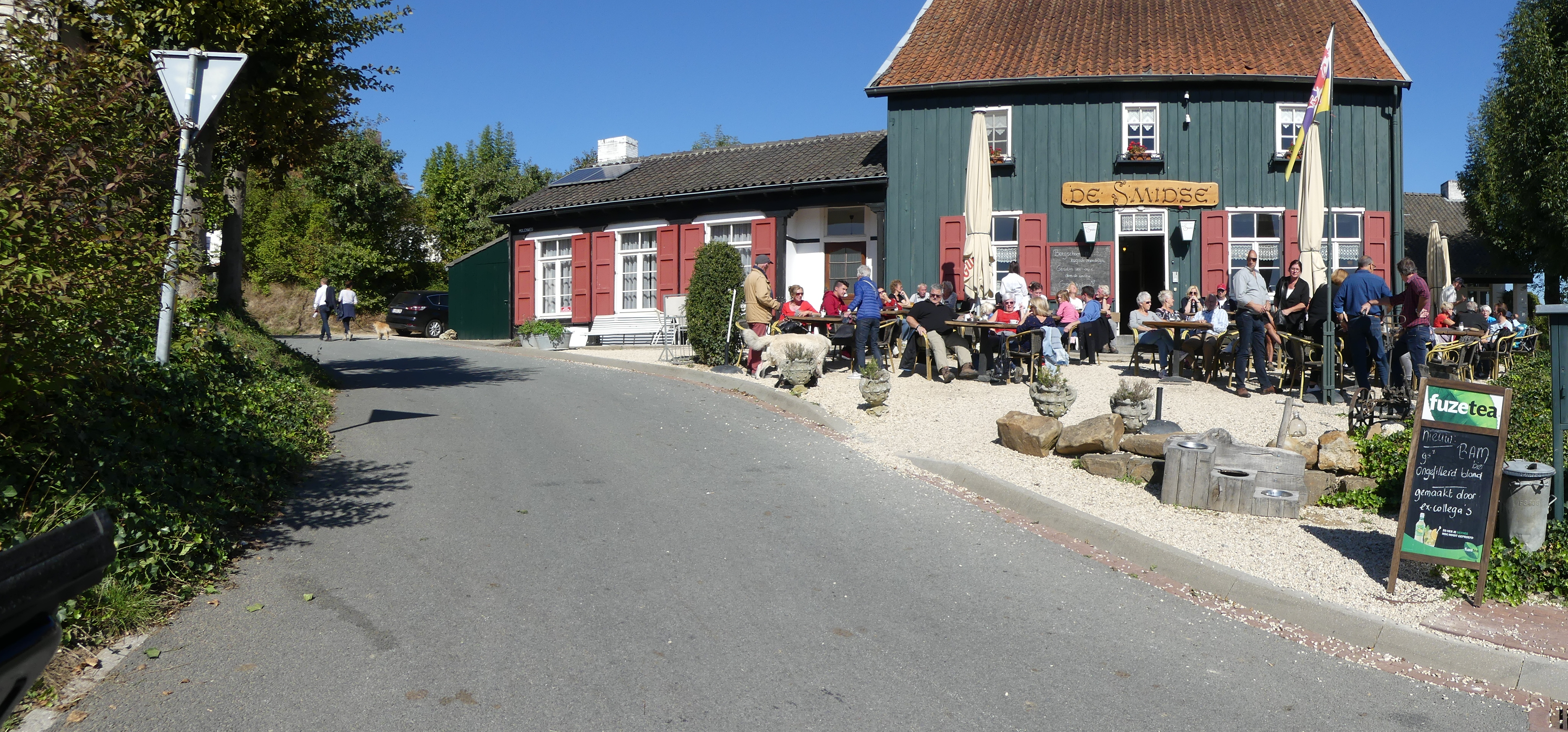
Inn De Smidse

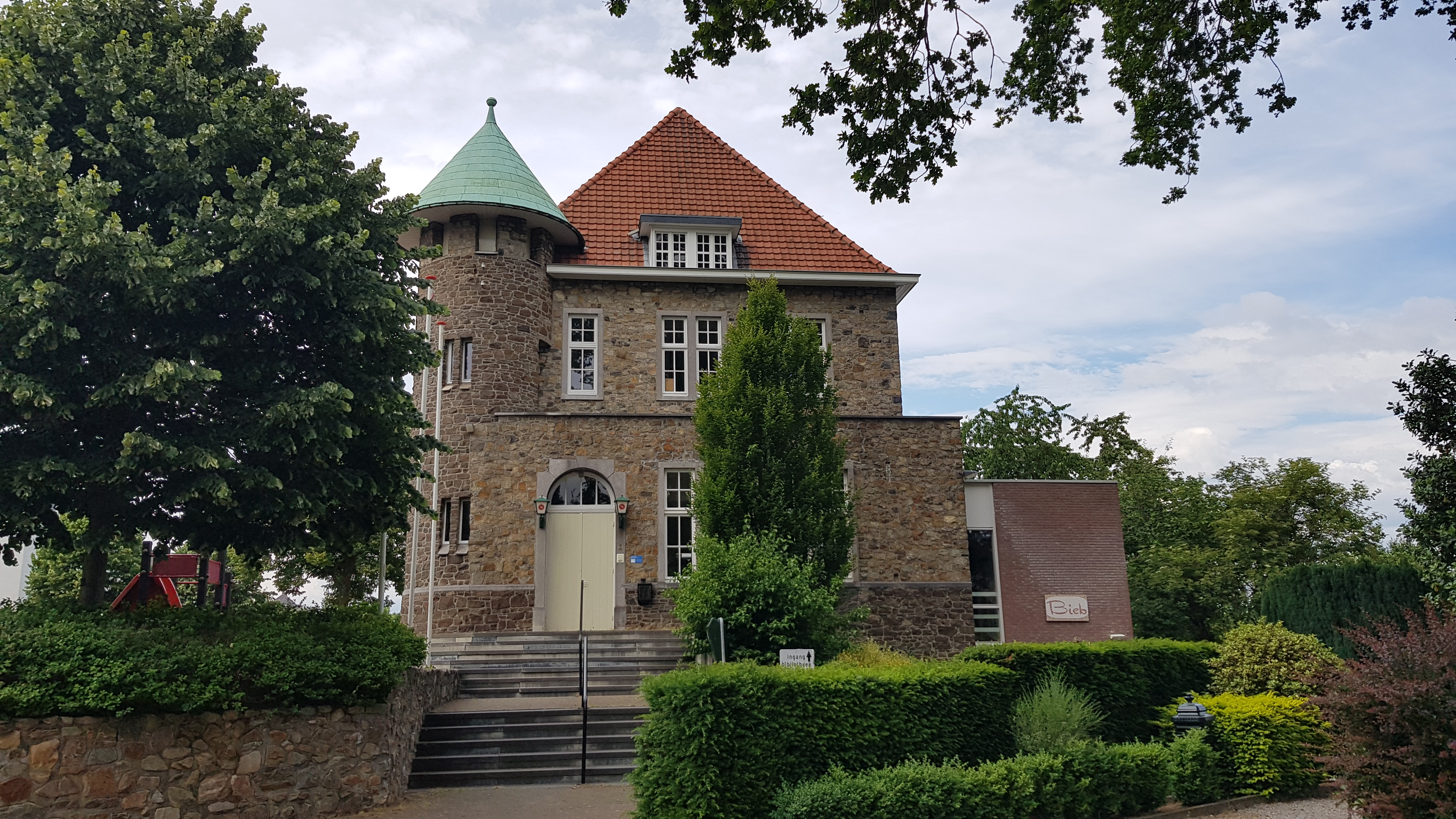
Het Patronaat

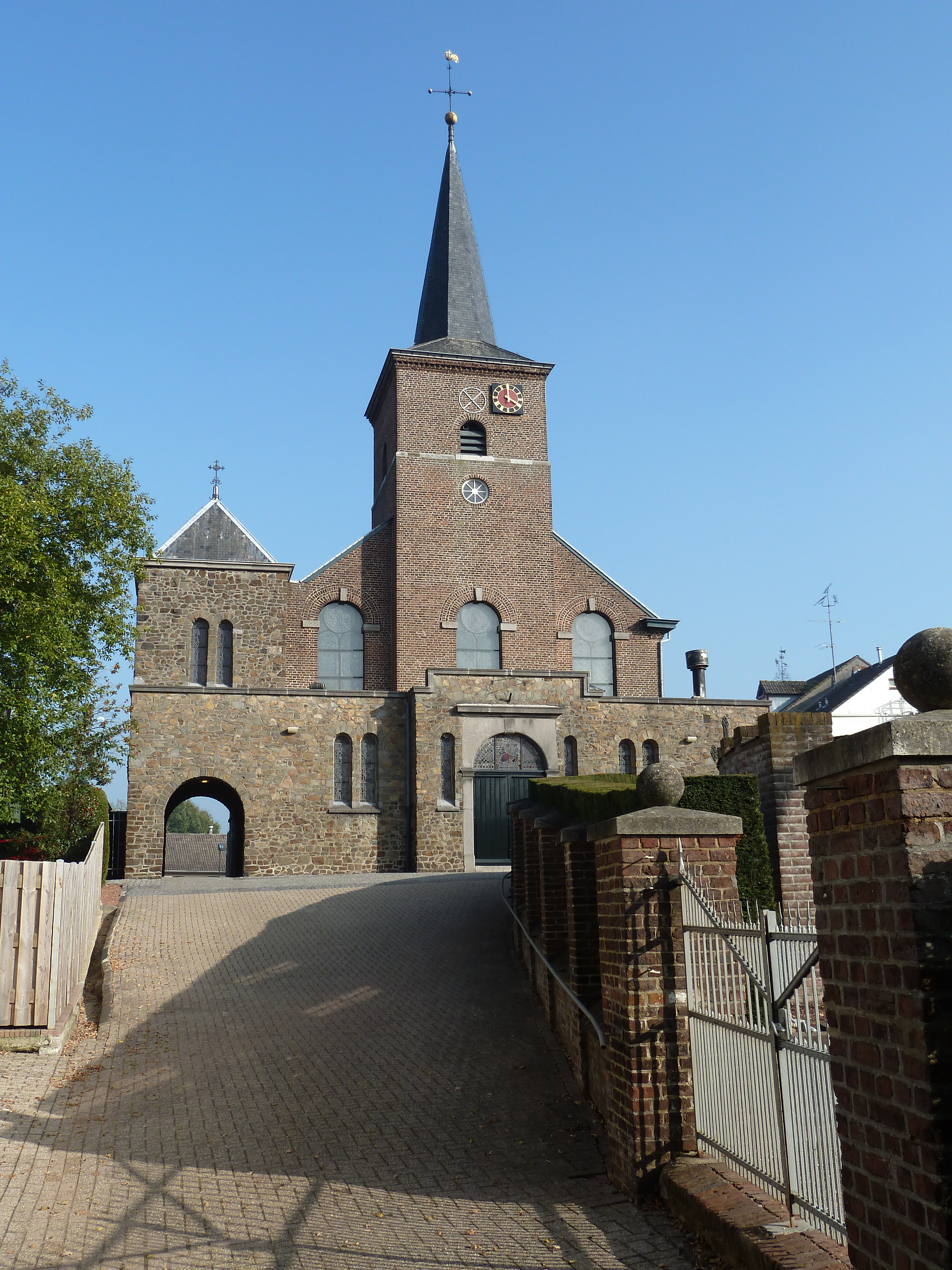
St Paul Conversion Church

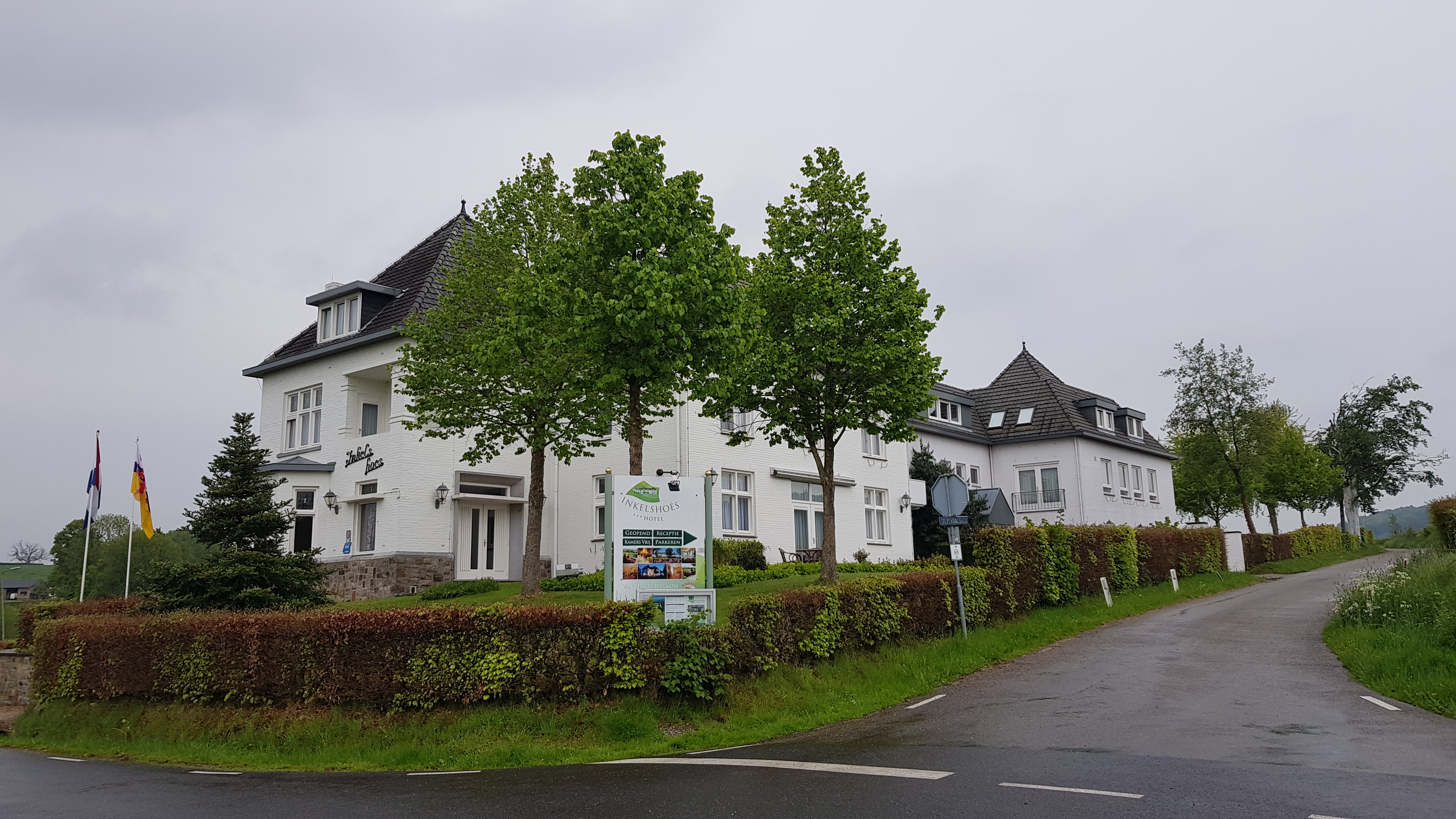
Hotel in Epen
