= Vijlen =

- Village
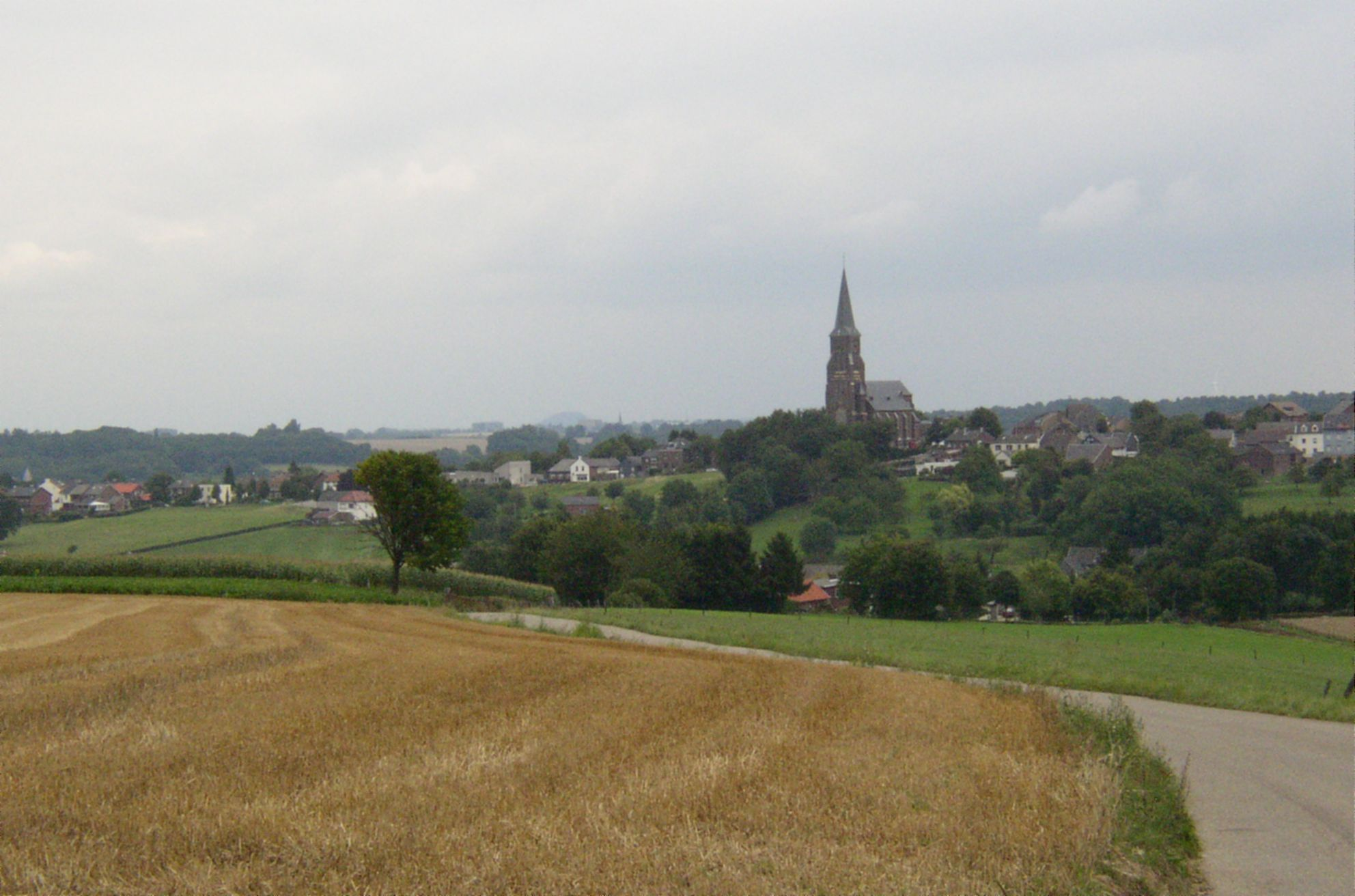
- Vijlen in 2005

- Location in the Netherlands Location in the province of Limburg in the Netherlands
- Coordinates: 50°47′23″N 5°57′47″E
- Country: Netherlands
- Province: Limburg
- Municipality: Vaals

Area
  - Total: 4.19 km^{2} (1.62 sq mi)
- Elevation: 192 m (630 ft)

Population (2021)
  - Total: 1,270
  - Density: 303/km^{2} (785/sq mi)
- Time zone: UTC+1 (CET)
  - Summer (DST): UTC+2 (CEST)
- Postal code: 6294
- Dialing code: 043

Vijlen (Limburgish: Viele) is a village in the South-East part of the Dutch province of Limburg. The village is constituted of a number of hamlets, among which Mamelis, Camerig, Harles and Cottessen. Including these hamlets, Vijlen has around 1,500 inhabitants (in 2005) and is part of the municipality of Vaals. Located at 200 meters above Normaal Amsterdams Peil, on top of the Vijlenerberg (Vijlener hill), it is the highest situated town in the Netherlands. The neo-Gothic and Catholic St. Martinus church, which is located in the center of the village, is known as the highest located church in the country.

The area around the village is well known for its natural environment and landscapes. The 'Mergelland Route', a touristic route through the South-Limburg area, leads through the village and its surroundings. With lodging and camping facilities available, tourism related business is a key source of income for the village.

The origin of the village is most likely Roman. The name Vijlen is generally believed to be derived from the Roman word 'villa' or 'villare' (farm estate or 'belonging to a farm estate'). Remains of a Roman villa have been found close to the village. The earliest known documentation on the village originates from 1016. Documentation of a gift to the abbey of Aachen-Burtscheidt in that year mentions property in Villiam (Uilliam). In the adjoining forest, the 'Vijlener bos', evidence of much earlier human activity in the area has been found. Communal graves from the Linear Pottery culture have been recovered, and indicate human settlements in the area around 5000 years ago.

== Gallery ==
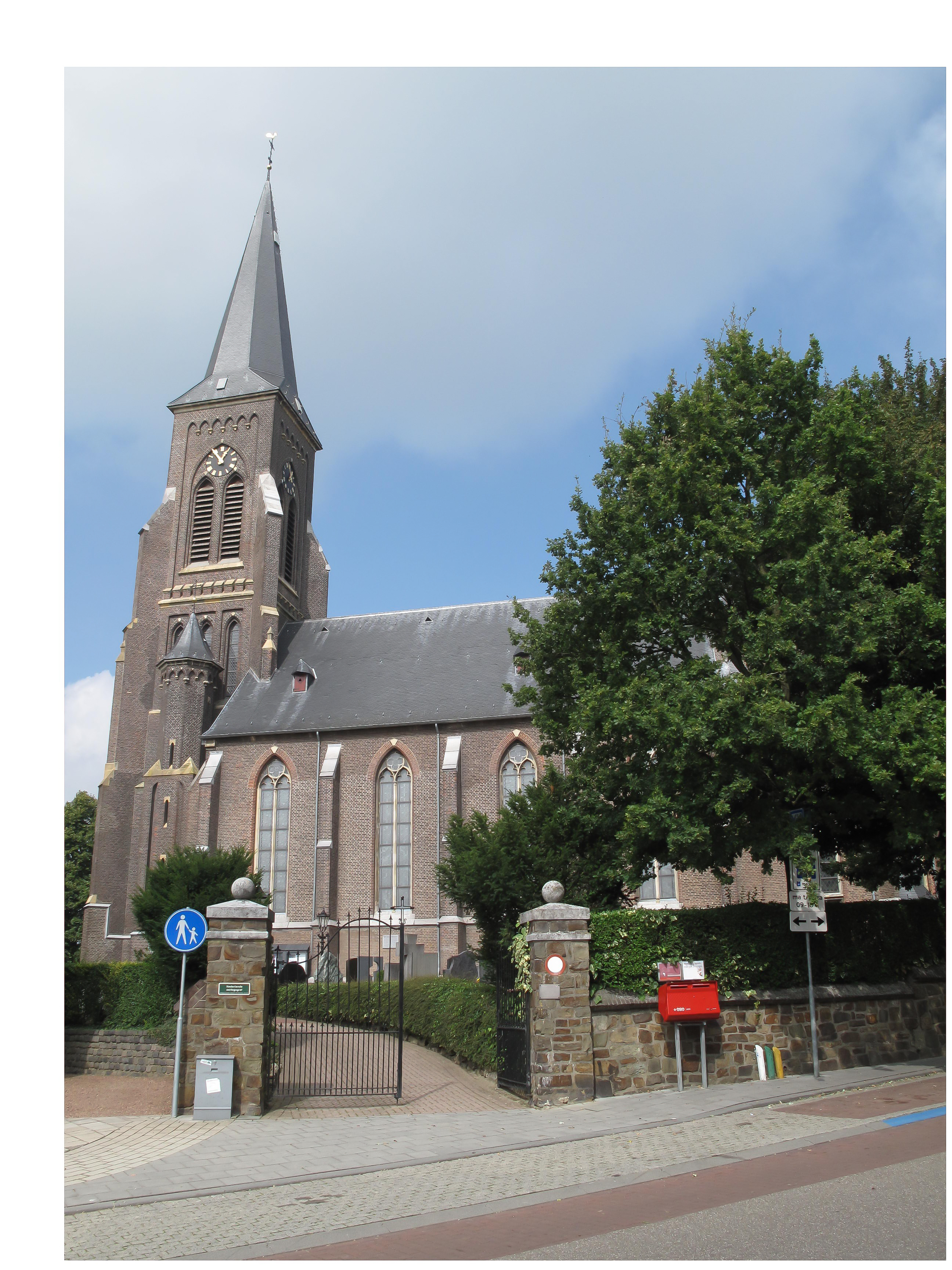
Vijlen, church

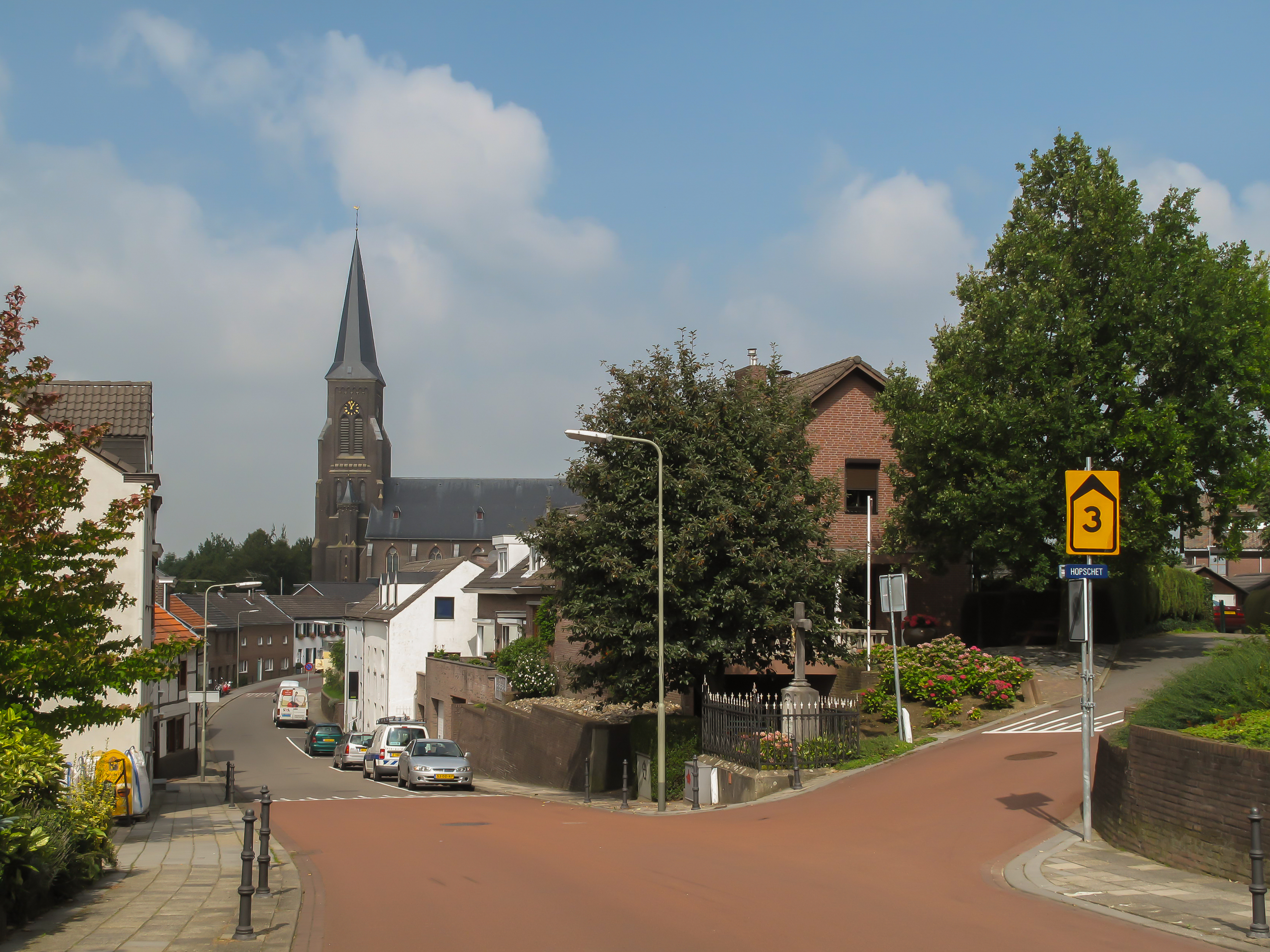
Vijlen, the village
