= Jan Gerard Kerkherdere =

Dutch Latinist

- Born: 7 November 1677; Hulsberg, Netherlands
- Died: 16 March 1738 (aged 60); Leuven, Austrian Netherlands
- Occupation(s): Latinist, Latin teacher, historiographer
- Title: Imperial Historiographer
- Spouse: Anna Maria Caulants (m. 1719)

Jan Gerard Kerkherdere (7 November 1677 – 16 March 1738) was a Dutch Latinist. He was a Latin teacher at the Collegium Trilingue in Leuven, in the Spanish Netherlands (from 1713 known as the Austrian Netherlands). Kerkherdere provoked controversy over his analyses of the Old Testament. His name in Latin was Ioannes Gerardus Falcoburgensis.

== Biography ==
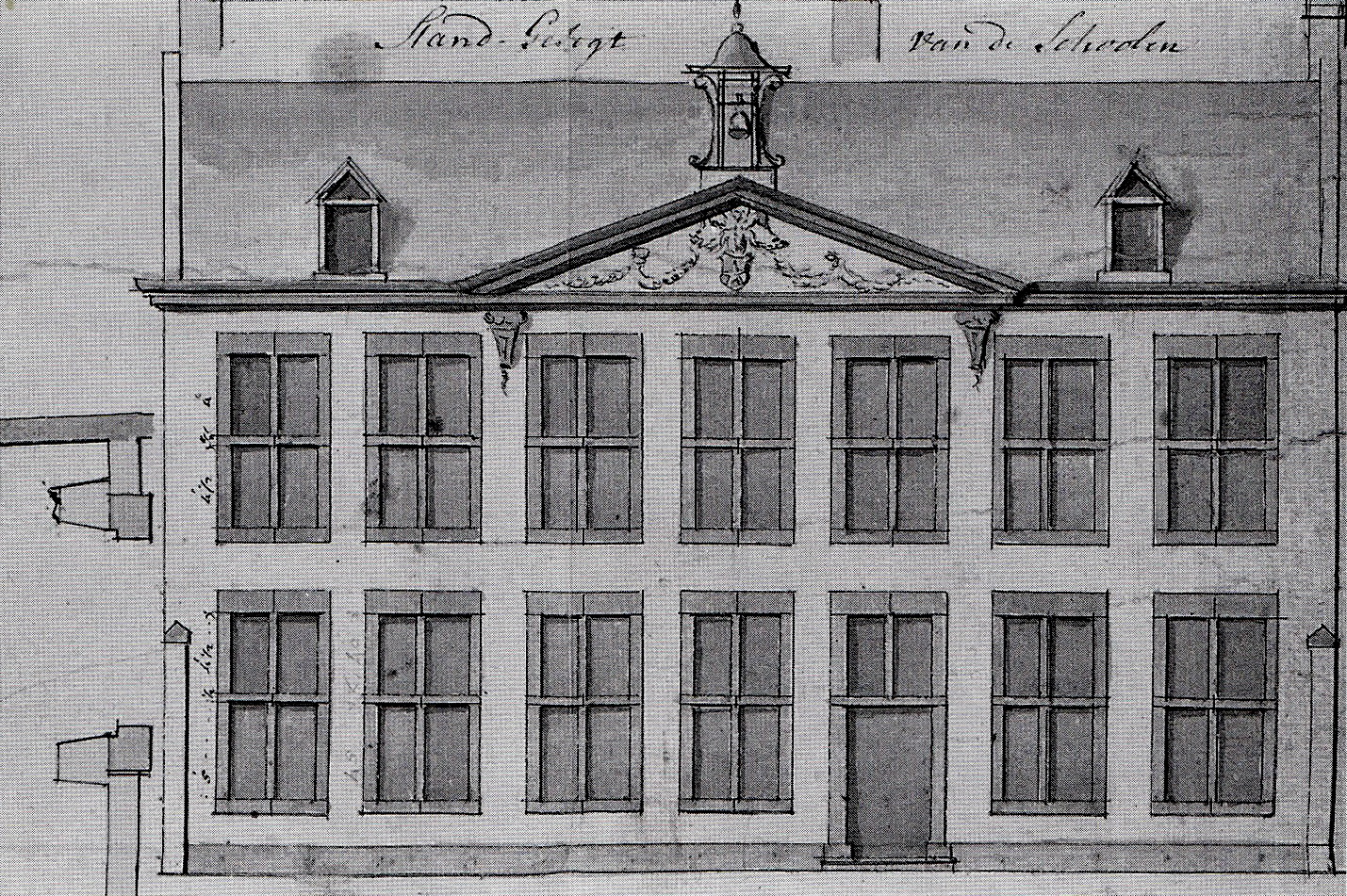
Latijnse school in Maastricht, where Kerkherdere's career as a Latinist began

Kerkherdere was born in Hulsberg, Staats-Overmaas, Netherlands, in the Valkenburg region (French: Fauquemont). The latter is reflected in his Latin name. Erroneously, his place of birth is sometimes indicated as Valkenburg or Wijnandsrade. He was a son of Jan Kerkherdere, alderman of the court of Climen, and of Maria Roebroox. He attended Latin school with the Jesuits in Maastricht. In 1694 he moved to Leuven, where he studied liberal arts. Kerkherdere was a student at the Pedagogie Het Varken, at the former Old University of Leuven. He graduated two years later as a philosopher (1696). He continued his studies in classical languages as well as theology, after which he received his diploma in the year 1700. He was never ordained. He spoke Latin, Greek and Hebrew fluently.

From 1700 until his death in 1738 he was professor of Latin at the Collegium Trilingue in Leuven. During his career as a Latinist, Kerkherdere was often asked to write Latin verses for festivities and special occasions. For example, he would proclaim a new Austrian governor or an anniversary at the university. He was known for the publication of a grammar of the Latin language. Readers appreciated his explanation of the rules and the exceptions without citing copious examples. In 1722 Emperor Joseph I of the Holy Roman Empire appointed him Imperial Historiographer.

As an historiographer, Kerkherdere published on the Old Testament. His analyzes were not always appreciated. During his life, but also after his death, some of his theses became controversial, namely when he saw a relationship between civil history and the biblical books.

Kerkherdere married Anna Maria Caulants in 1719. He died in Leuven in 1738.

== Works ==
All his publications were in Latin.

- Grammatica latina in faciliorem methodum redacta additis anomaliarum causis. Leuven, 1st edition in 1706.
- Systema apocalypticum. Leuven, 1st edition in 1708. This is where his research work on the Old Testament began.
- Prodroma Danielicus, sive novi conatus historici critici in celeberrimas difficultates historiae Veteris Testamenti, monarchiarum Asiae et ac praecipue Danielem prophetam. Study on the prophet Daniel and princes in the Near East.
- Monarchia Romae paganae, secundum concordiam inter Sanctos Prophetas Danielem et Joannem nunquam hactenus tentatum. Consequens historia a Monarchia conditoribus usque ad Urbis et Imperii ruinam, opus praemissum quatuor monarchiis. Accedit series Historiae Apocalypticae. Leuven, 1st edition 1727. He received critical acclaim for this work on the relationship between ancient Rome and the Bible.
- De situ Paradisi terrestris. Leuven, 1731. This work deals with the location of the Garden of Eden.
- There are several compilations of his poems. One of these is his ode on the accession to the throne of Emperor Charles VI of the Holy Roman Empire and thus the new Duke of Brabant (Peace of Utrecht (1713)): Carolus sextus semper augustus inauguratur dux Brabantiae.
