= Ulestraten =

Ulestraten Ulesjtraote
- Village
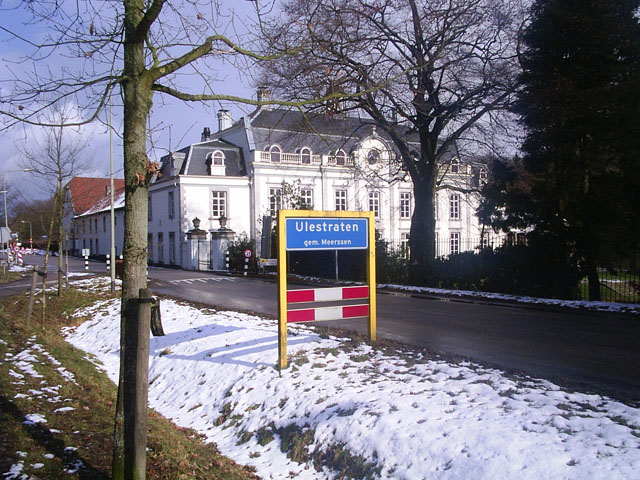
- Place name sign and Huize Vliek

- Flag Coat of arms

- Location in the Netherlands Location in the province of Limburg in the Netherlands
- Coordinates: 50°54′19″N 5°46′49″E
- Country: Netherlands
- Province: Limburg
- Municipality: Meerssen

Area
  - Total: 5.84 km^{2} (2.25 sq mi)
- Elevation: 125 m (410 ft)

Population (2021)
  - Total: 2,805
  - Density: 480/km^{2} (1,240/sq mi)
- Time zone: UTC+1 (CET)
  - Summer (DST): UTC+2 (CEST)
- Postal code: 6235
- Dialing code: 043

Ulestraten (Limburgish: Ulesjtraote) is a village in the Dutch province of Limburg. It is located in the municipality of Meerssen. It is surrounded by several forests.

== History ==
The village was first mentioned in 1335 as Hulenstroten, and is combination of "land near water" and "swampy place with shrubbery". Ulestration developed in the Middle Ages on the plateau of Schimmert. Between 1626 and 1794, it was a heerlijkheid within the Land van Valkenburg. Between June 1814 and May 1815, it was part of Prussia, but awarded to the Kingdom of the Netherlands at the Congress of Vienna. Ulestraten became an independent parish in 1833.

The St Catharina Church is a three aisled basilica-like church built between 1905 and 1906 in Gothic Revival style. Initially, the tower from 1805/1806 was retained, but it was replaced in 1929 by a new tower.

Vliek Castle was first mentioned in 1374. The current manor house was built around 1725 in Louis XIV style. Short side wings have been added in 1908.

Ulestraten was home to 366 people in 1840. In 1944, an airfield was built by the Allies partially in the municipality of Ulestraten. It is currently known as Maastricht Aachen Airport. The airport triggered a rapid population increase and industrialisation of the village. It was a separate municipality until 1982, when it was merged with Meerssen.

== Gallery ==
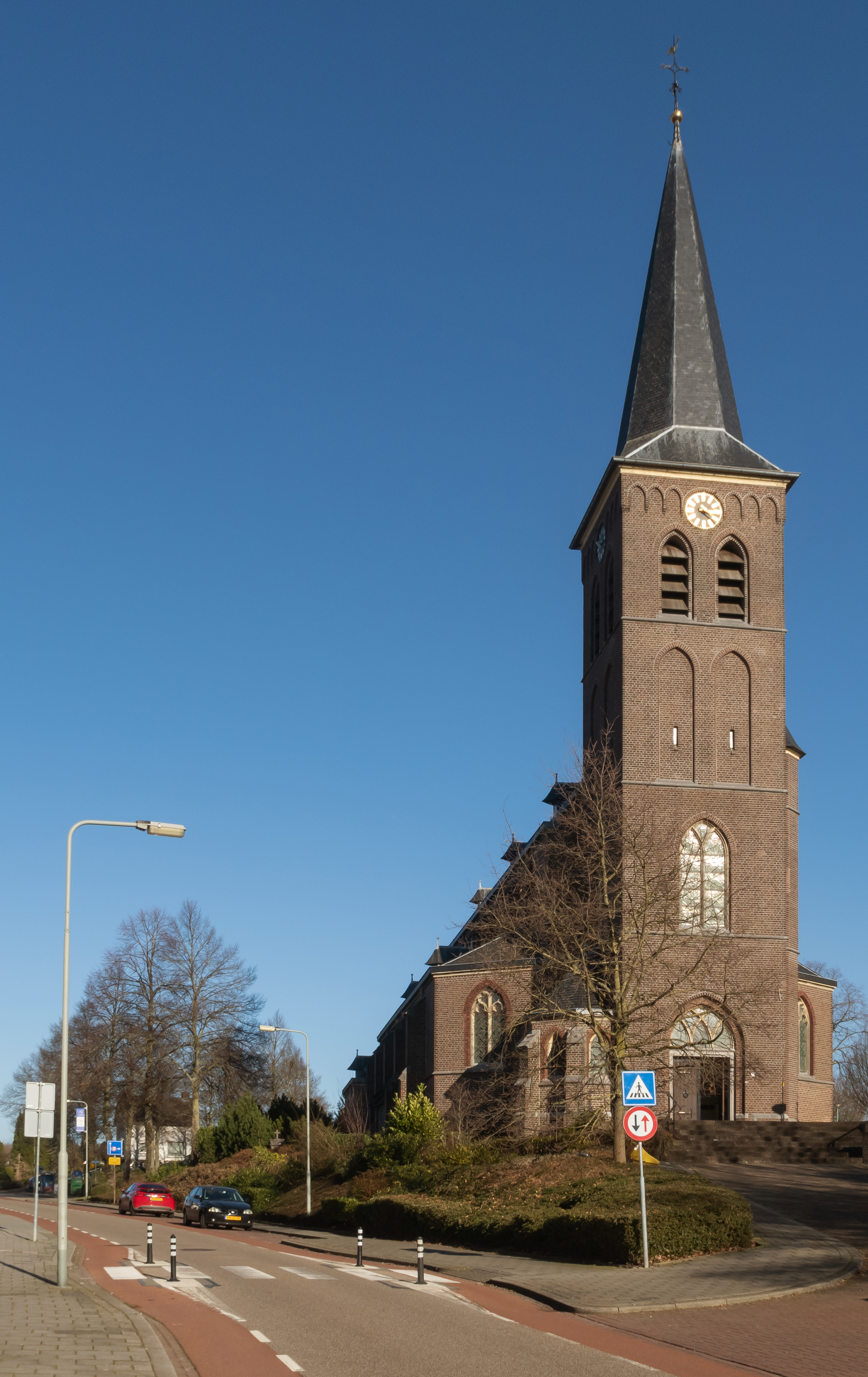
The St Catharina Church

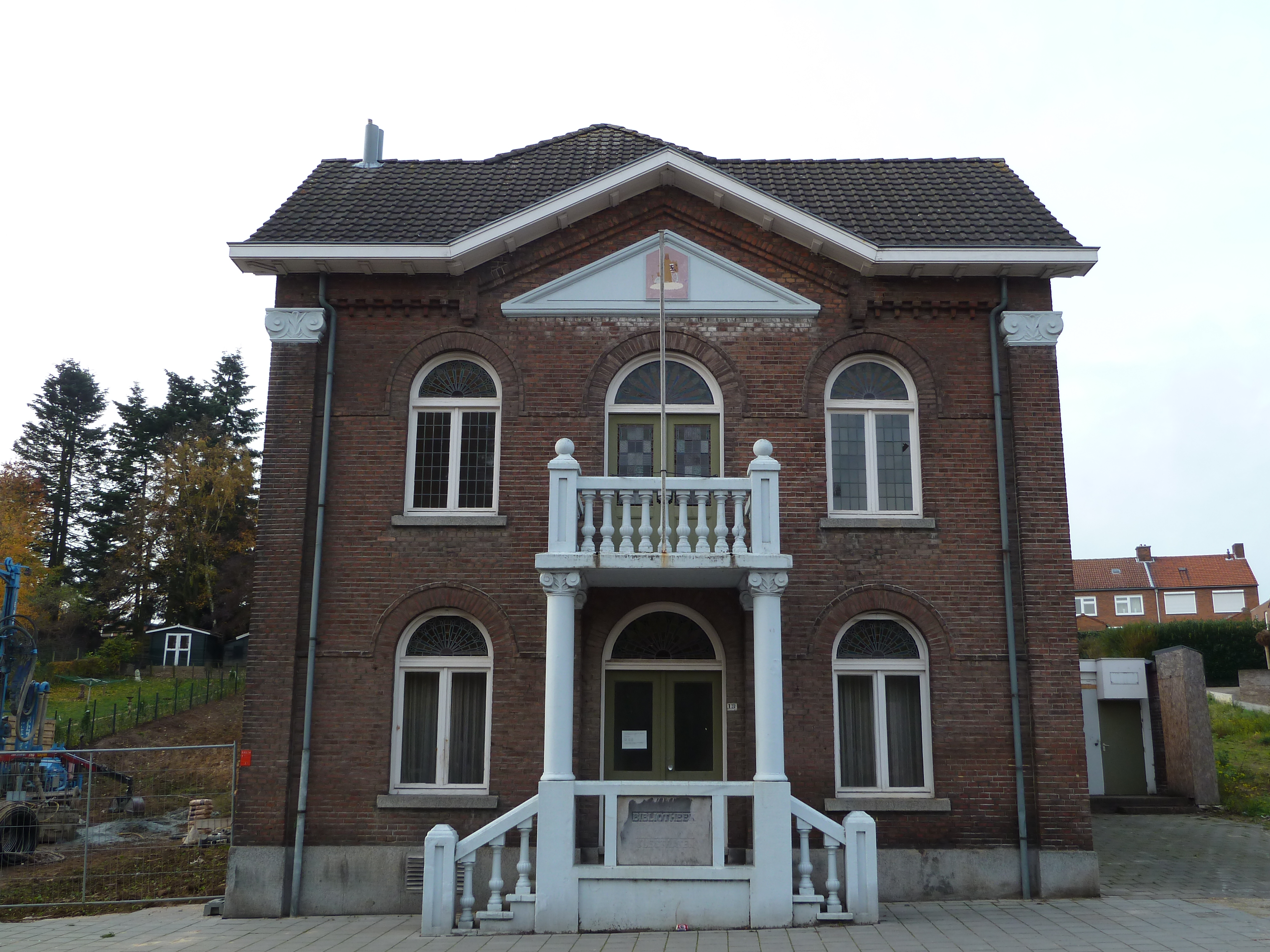
Villa in Ulestraten

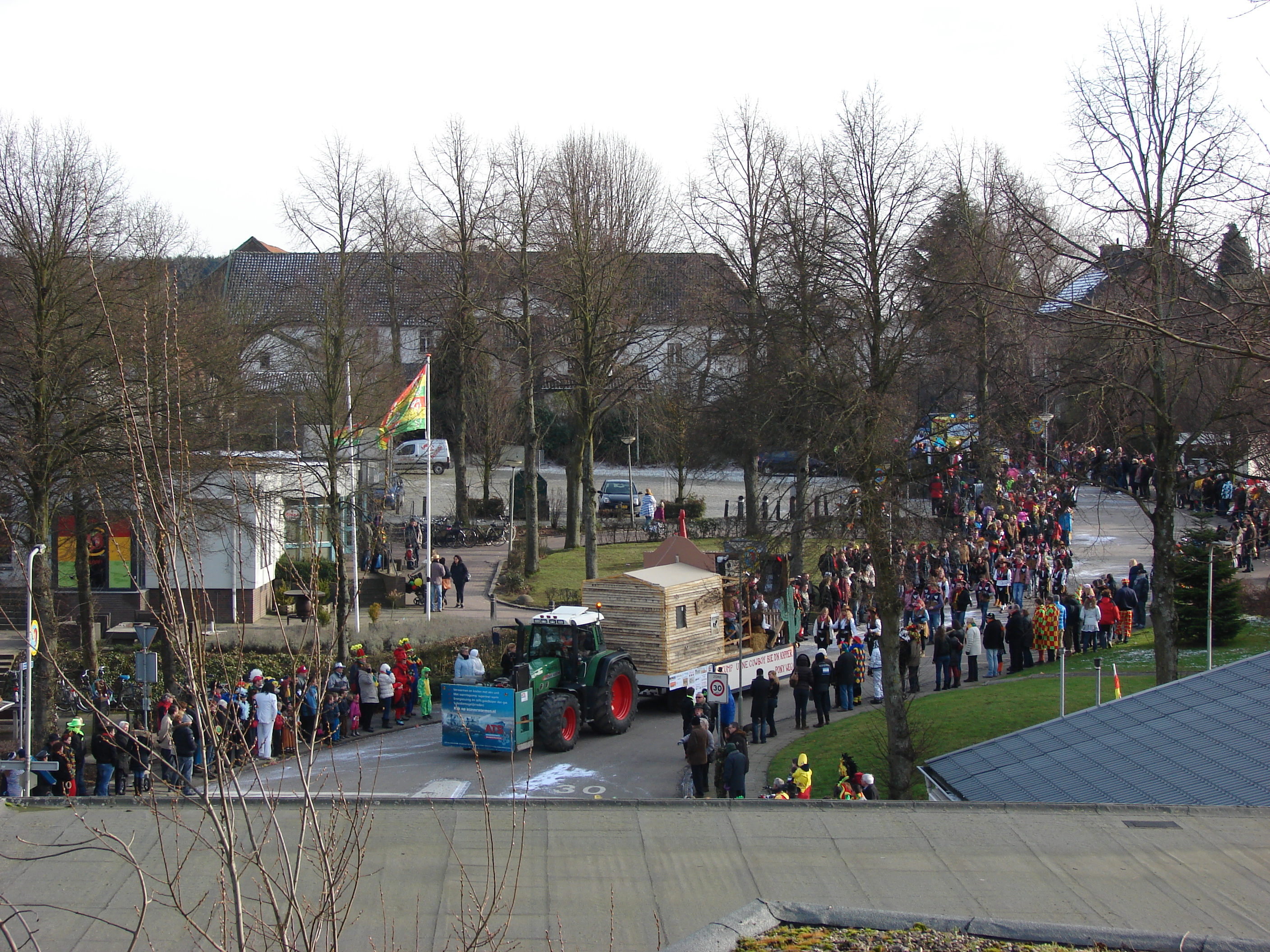
Carnival in Ulestraten

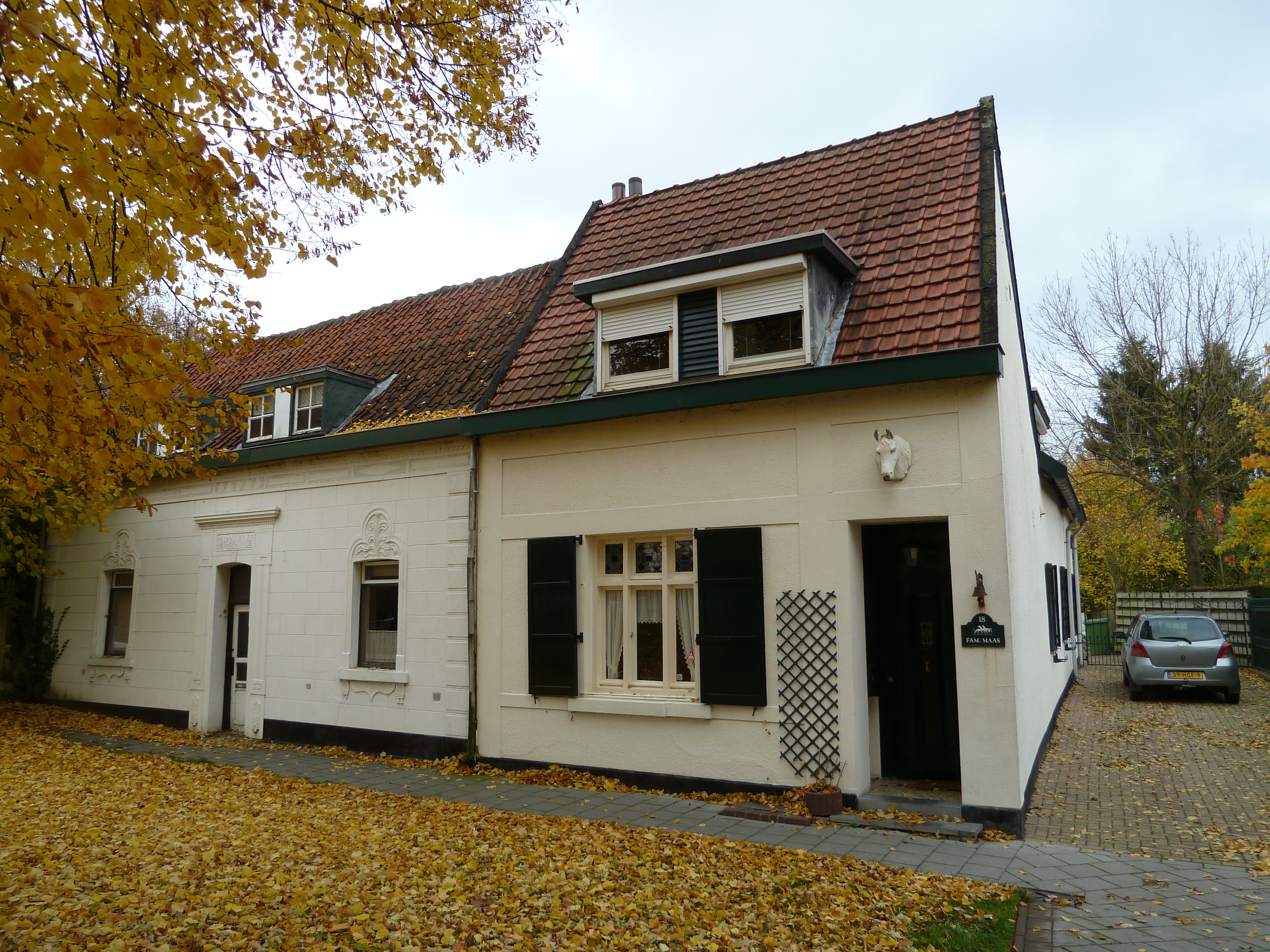
House in Ulestraten
