= Hulsberg =

Hulsberg Hölsberg
- Village
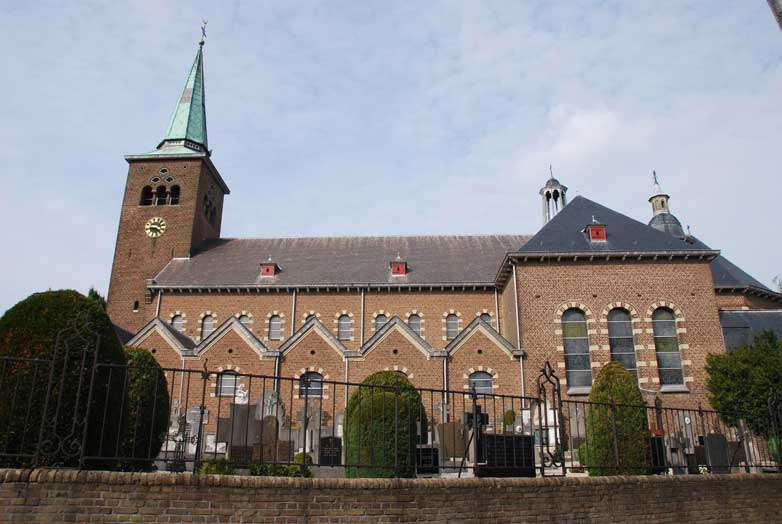
- Church of Hulsberg

- Location in the Netherlands Location in the province of Limburg in the Netherlands
- Coordinates: 50°53′18″N 5°51′19″E
- Country: Netherlands
- Province: Limburg
- Municipality: Beekdaelen

Area
  - Total: 3.52 km^{2} (1.36 sq mi)
- Elevation: 132 m (433 ft)

Population (2021)
  - Total: 3,180
  - Density: 903/km^{2} (2,340/sq mi)
- Time zone: UTC+1 (CET)
  - Summer (DST): UTC+2 (CEST)
- Postal code: 6336
- Dialing code: 045

Hulsberg (Dutch pronunciation: [ˈɦʏlzbɛr(ə)x]; Limburgish: Hölsberg) is a village in southeastern Netherlands. It is located in the municipality of Beekdaelen, Limburg, about 15 km east of Maastricht.

== History ==
The village was first mentioned in 1147 as Huleberga, and means "hill of holly (Ilex aquifolium)". The area around Hulsberg was donated to the Abbey of Saint-Remi in 968. Hulsberg is a village with a dries (type of village square).

The Catholic St Clemens Church is a three-aisled church from 1820. In 1908, Joseph Cuypers designed a new choir. The remainder was redesigned in 1930.

Hulsberg was home to 332 people in 1840. Until 1982, Hulsberg was a municipality of its own. After the re-arrangement of the municipalities in the Netherlands, Hulsberg and Schimmert were merged with the municipality of Nuth. In 2019, Nuth merged into Beekdaelen.

Hulsberg is a popular stay-over place for Dutch. Its accommodations include two campings, and several hotels and motels). Hulsberg is only 3 kilometres from Valkenburg aan de Geul with several tourist attractions.

Hulsberg is the namesake of a radio mast, Zendmast Hulsberg, which is located in the territory of Valkenburg aan de Geul.

== Gallery ==
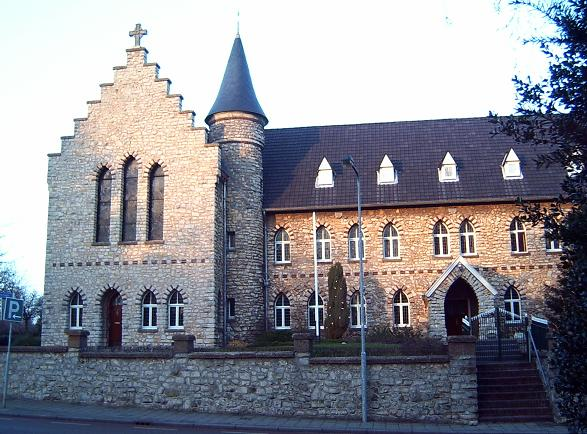
Monastery

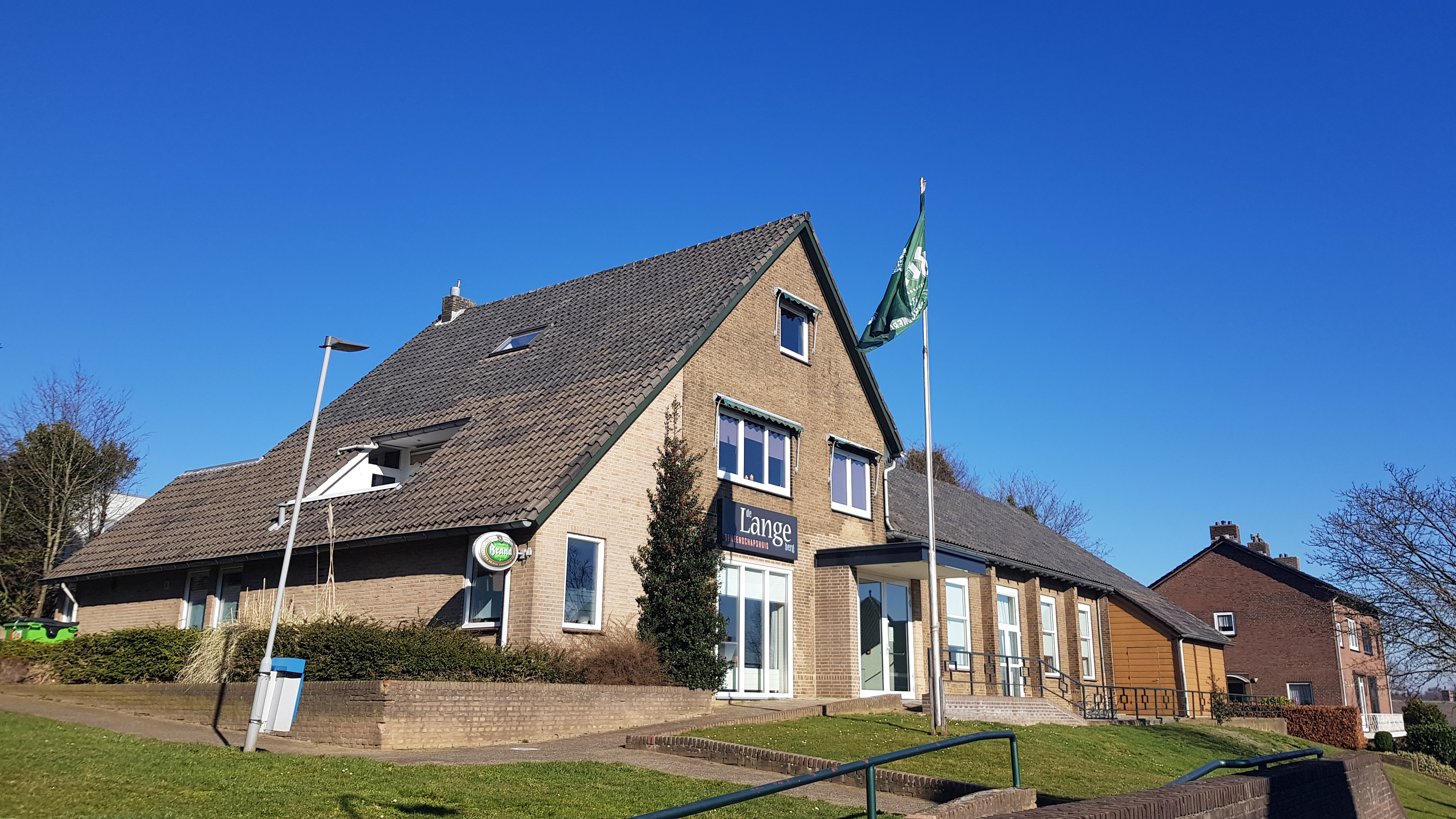
Community house

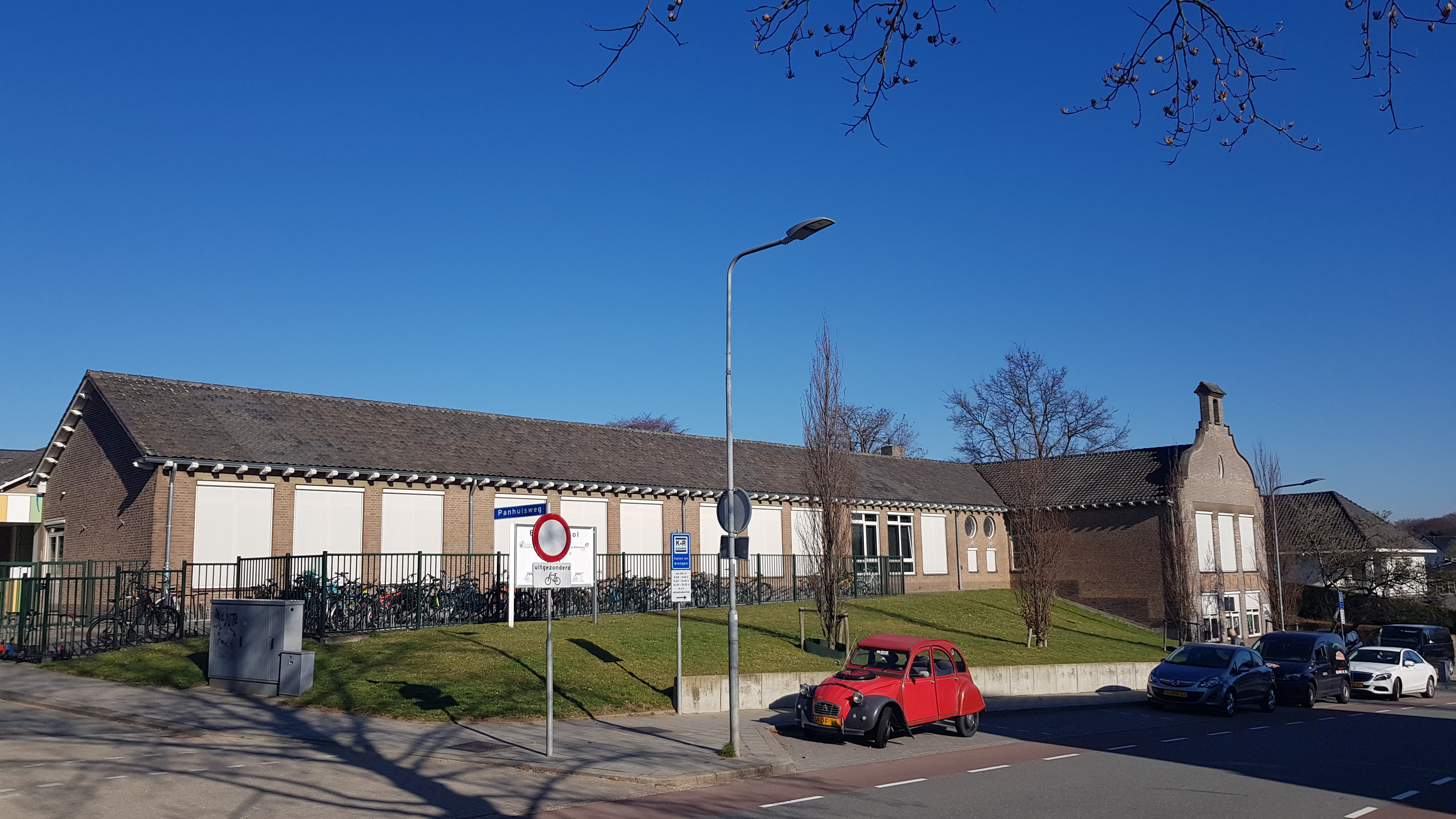
School in Hulsberg

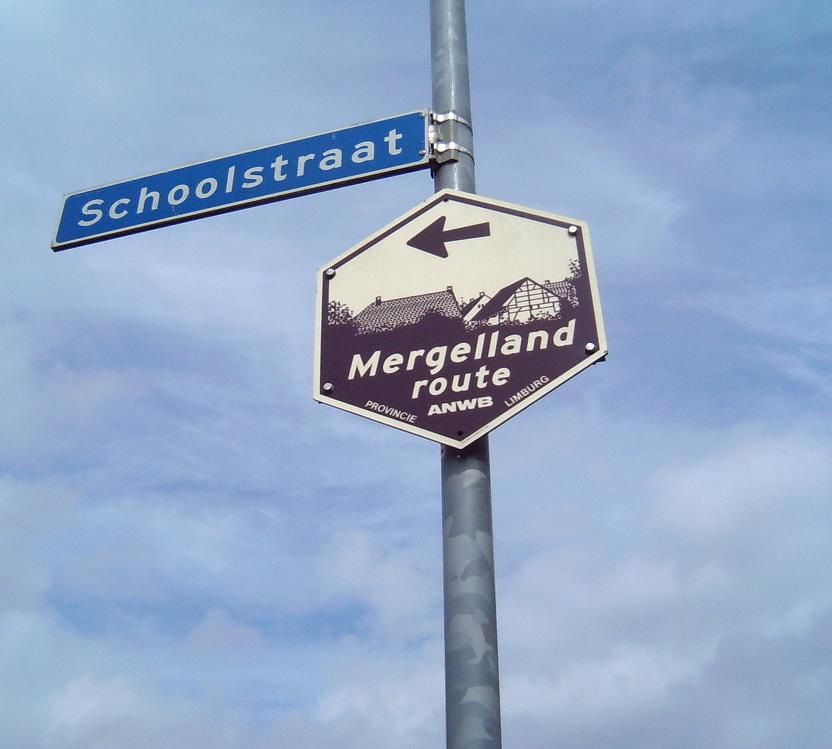
Mergellandroute sign in Hulsberg

== Notable people ==
- Peter Akkermans, archaeologist (born 1957)
- Tjarco Cuppens, racing cyclist (born 1976)
- Jan Gerard Kerkherdere, Latinist (1677–1738)
- Ada Kok, swimmer (born 1947)
- Johannes Herman Frederik Umbgrove, geologist (1899–1954)
