= Eijsden-Margraten =

- Municipality
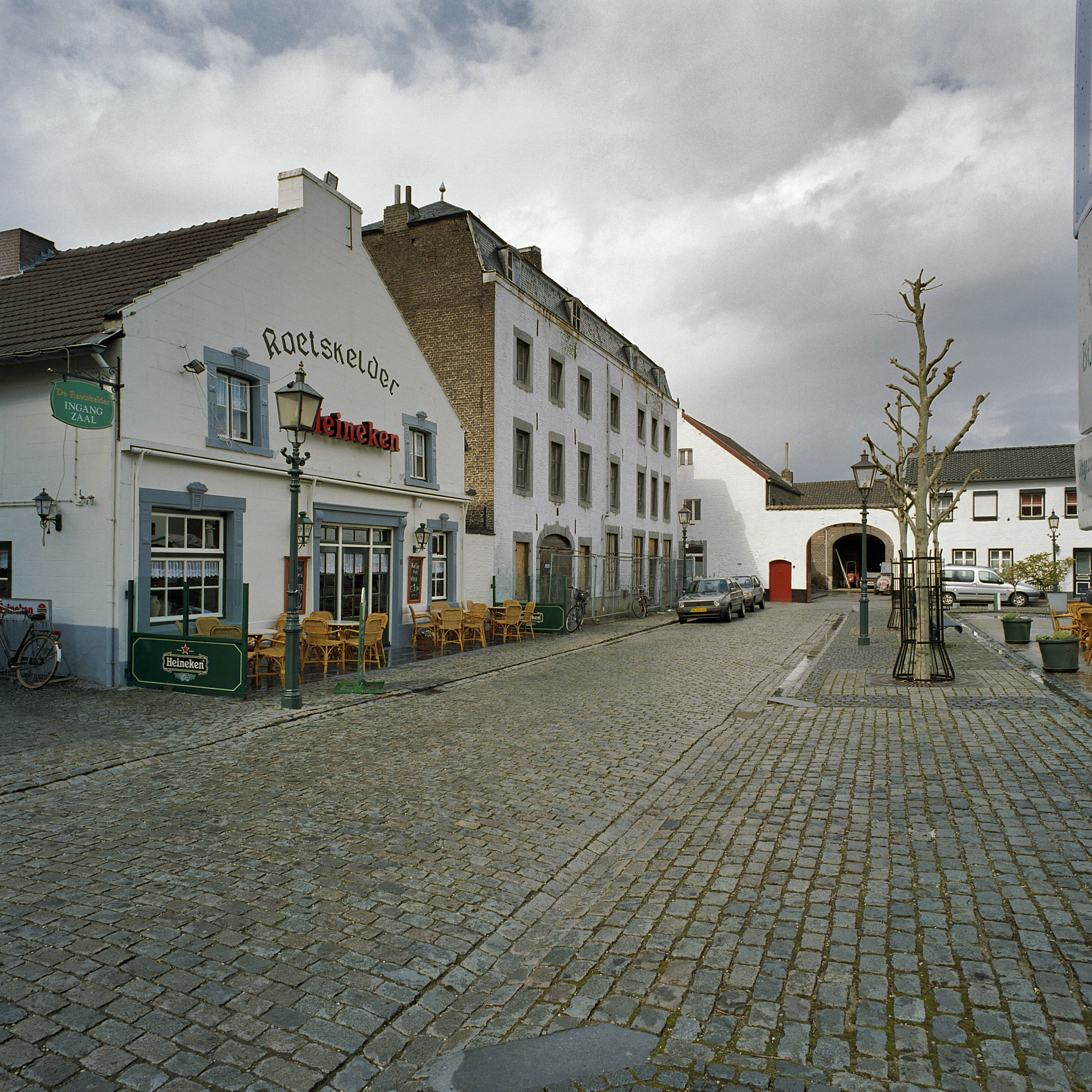
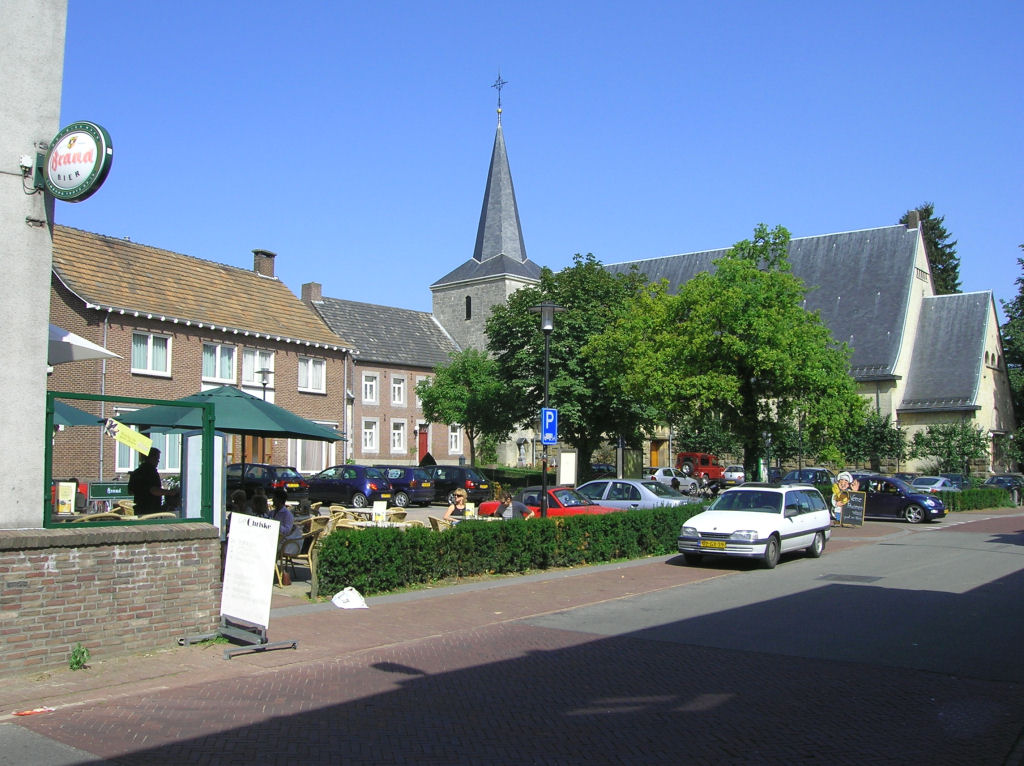
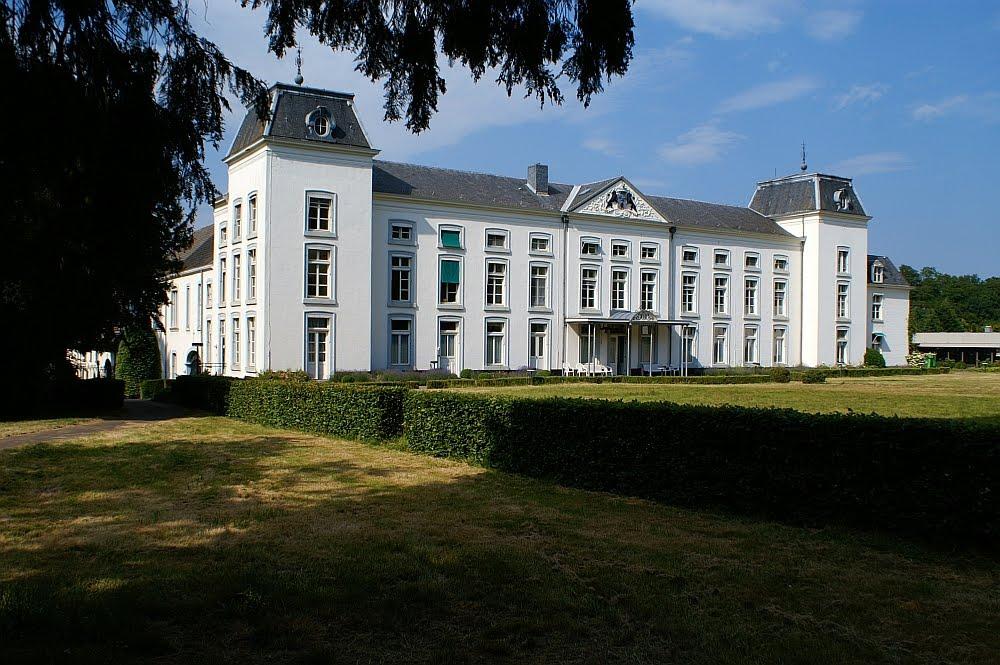
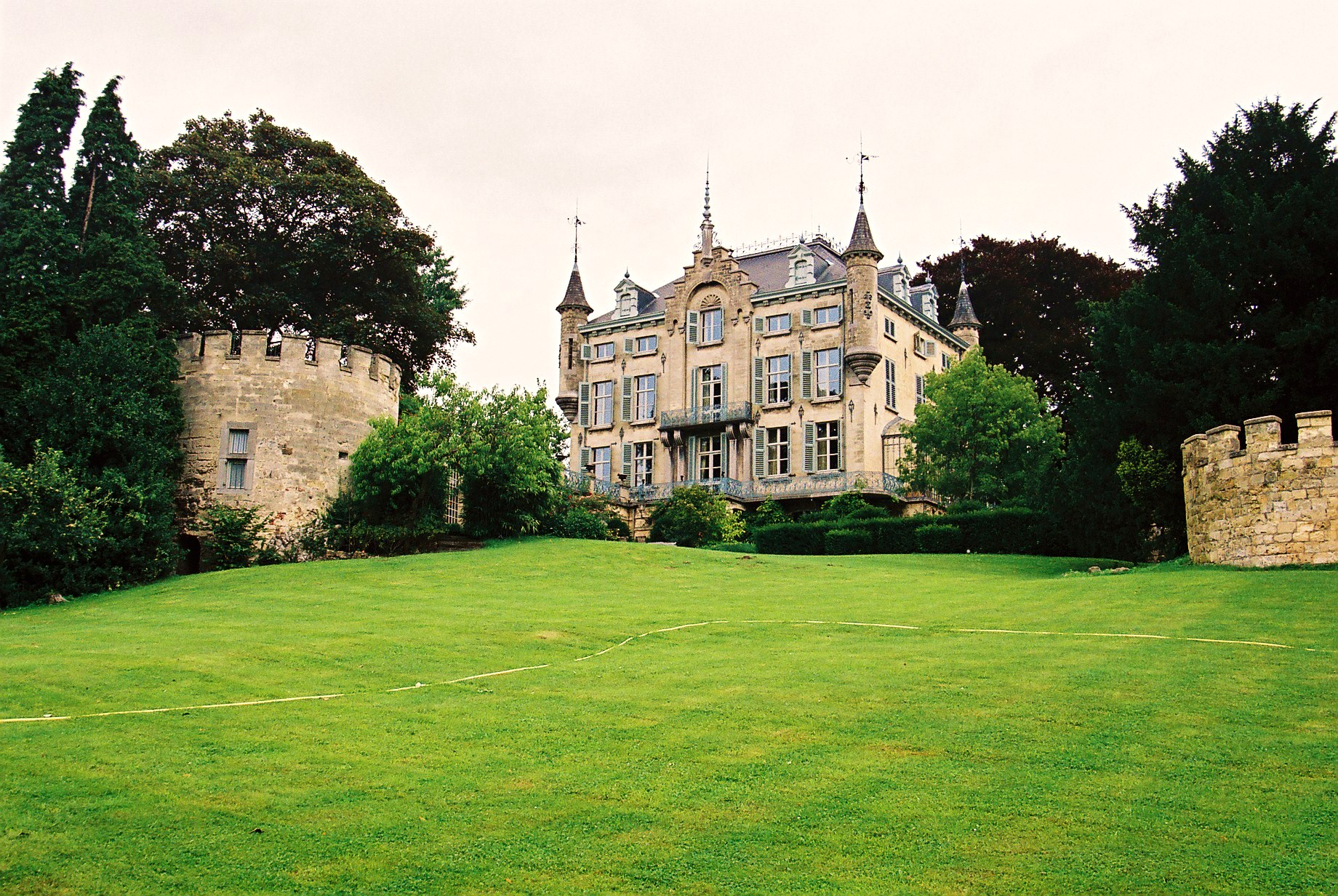
- View on Neerbeek View on Margraten Blankenberg Castle at Cadier en Keer Gronsveld castle

- Flag Coat of arms

- Location in Limburg
- Coordinates: 50°47′N 5°42′E
- Country: Netherlands
- Province: Limburg
- Established: 1 January 2011

Government
  - Body: Municipal council
  - Mayor: Sjraar Cox

Area
  - Total: 78.77 km^{2} (30.41 sq mi)
  - Land: 77.55 km^{2} (29.94 sq mi)
  - Water: 1.22 km^{2} (0.47 sq mi)
- Elevation: 56 m (184 ft)

Population (January 2021)
  - Total: 25,900
  - Density: 334/km^{2} (870/sq mi)
- Time zone: UTC+1 (CET)
  - Summer (DST): UTC+2 (CEST)
- Postcode: 6245–6269, 6307
- Area code: 043
- Website: www.eijsden-margraten.nl

Eijsden-Margraten (Dutch: [ˌɛizdəˈmɑrɣraːtə(n)]; Limburgish: Èèsjde-Mergraote) is a municipality situated in the very south of the Netherlands. There it is located in the southeastern part of the province of Limburg.

This municipality was formed in 2011 from the former municipalities of Eijsden and Margraten, that both consisted of a number of separately situated villages. As a result, the nowadays Eijsden-Margraten municipality consists of 28 villages and townships, spread out over 15 administrative centres. As of 2011, it has a population of about 25,000.

Eijsden-Margraten is one of the most southerly municipalities in the Netherlands, for in its south it is extending up to the most southerly part of the border between the Netherlands and Belgium.

The Meuse river, coming from France and Belgium, at Eijsden enters its third and final flowing country, the Netherlands. From here on its name in Dutch is "Maas". Running northward to Eijsden-Margraten's west it locally forms the westerly frontier of the last mentioned country with Belgium.

A smaller stream, the Voer, coming from Belgium, drains into the Meuse river in this municipality, after having passed through a few of its villages.

== Population centres ==
- Banholt
- Bemelen
- Cadier en Keer
- Eckelrade
- Eijsden
- Gronsveld
- Margraten
- Mariadorp
- Mesch
- Mheer
- Noorbeek
- Oost-Maarland
- Rijckholt
- Scheulder
- Sint Geertruid

Of them Eijsden, Gronsveld, Mariadorp, Mesch, Oost-Maarland and Rijckholt are former parts of the Eijsden municipality, whereas the others are former parts of the Margraten municipality.

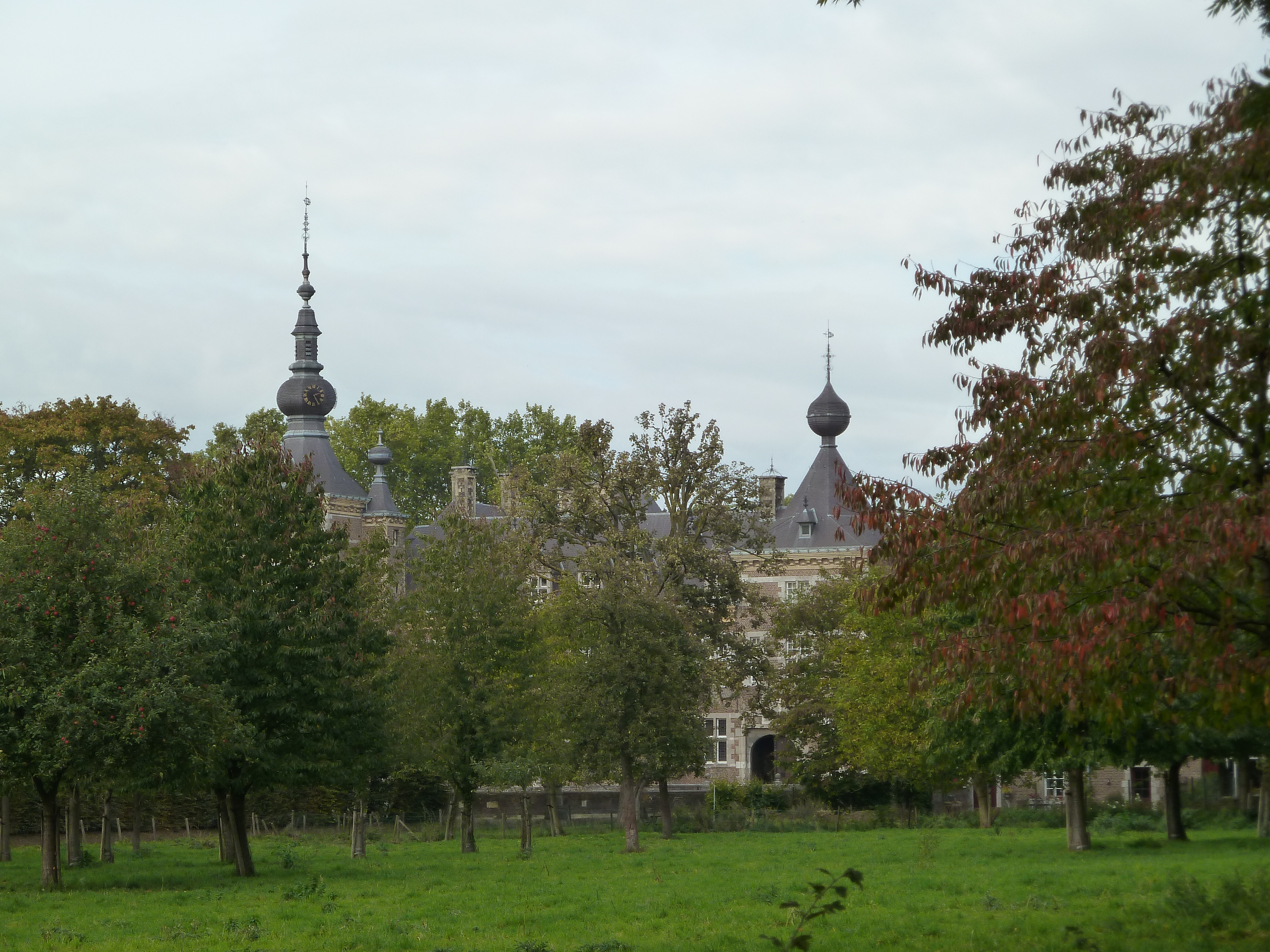
Fruit trees near Eijsden Castle

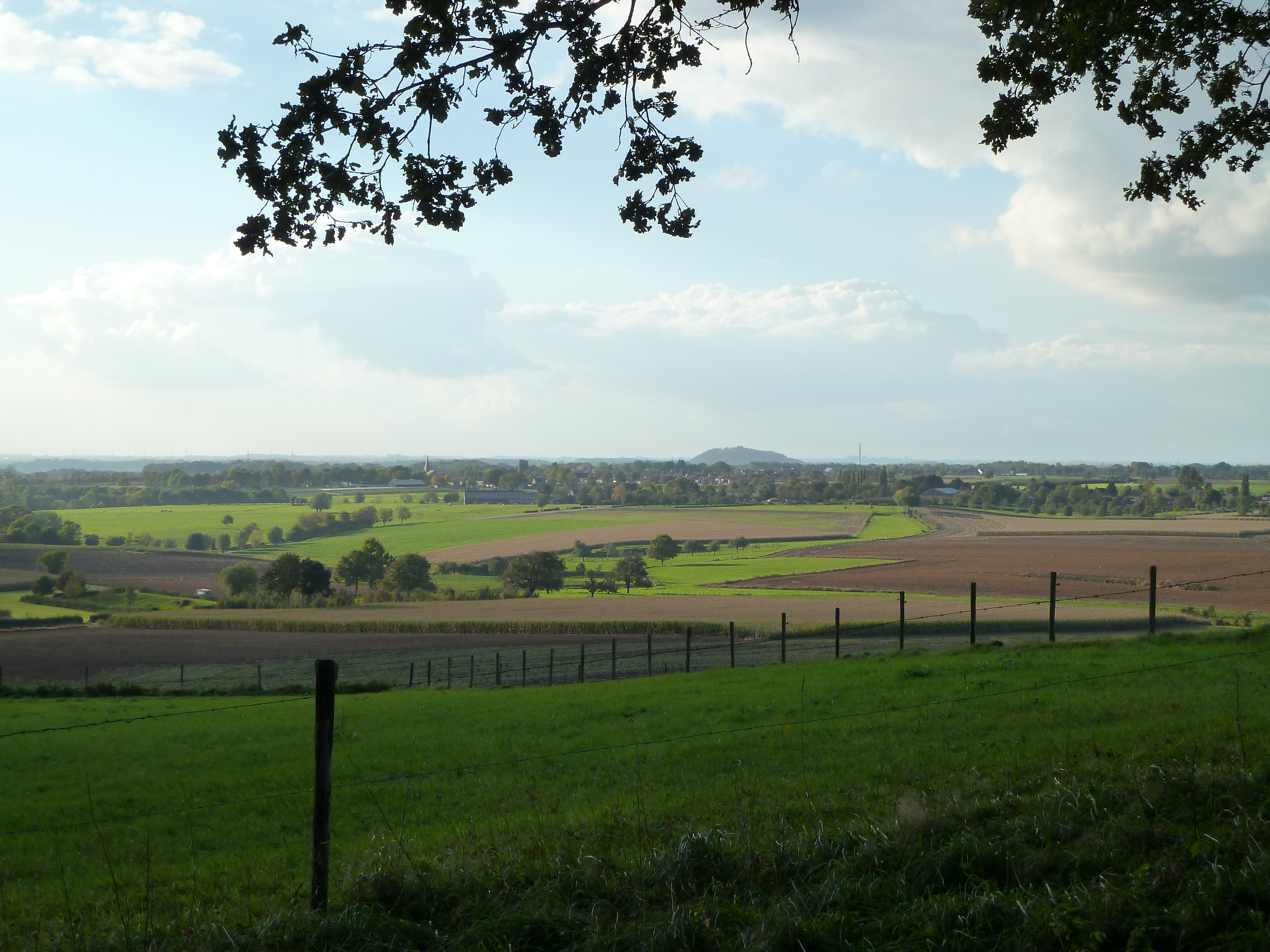
Land pastures on the hilly Margraten Plateau

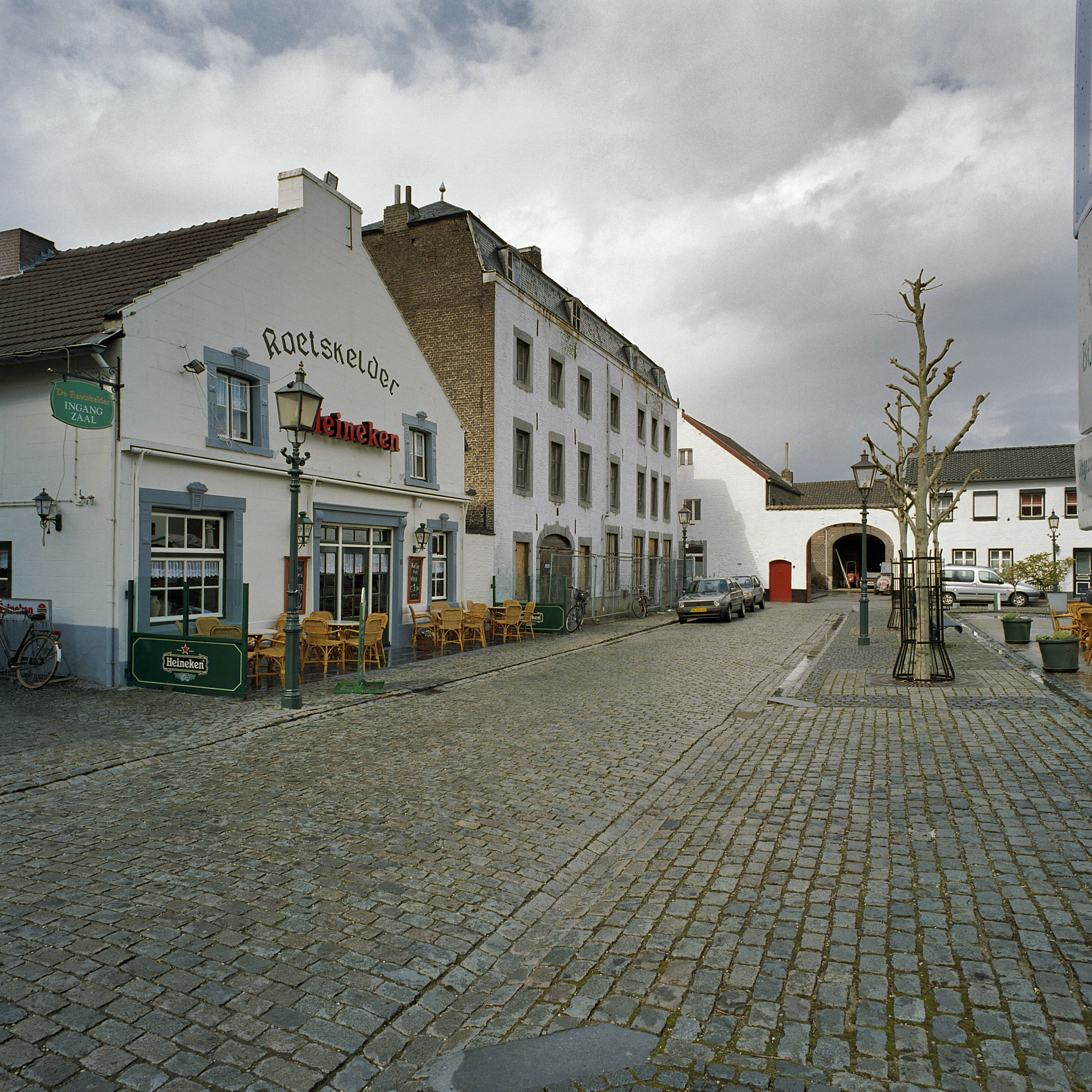
Part of the Eijsden "Vroenhof" central square

Apart from Mesch all former Eijsden villages are situated in the valley of the Meuse river, whereas Mesch and the former Margraten villages are on a highland called the "Margraten Plateau".

== Economy ==
Main aspects of economical activity in the for a long time agricultural villages of this municipality are:

- Fruit growing (apples, pears, prunes, cherries, strawberries).
- Grain growing (wheat, barley, corn)
- Cattle farming (milk cows, hen's eggs)
- Some industry (mainly at Eijsden)
- Tourism

== Culture ==
Essential elements of culture in this municipality's villages are:

- Music (most places have their own brass-band and church chorus);
- Religion (predominantly Roman Catholic);
- Folklore (among others several citizen soldieries);
- Carnival;
- Sports, of which especially bicycle racing and soccer are most popular;
- Art

== Sights ==
- Castles of Eijsden, Gronsveld, Mheer and Rijckholt
- An ancient windmill at Bemelen and five ancient water mills on the Voer river.
- Prehistoric flint mines at Rijckholt
- The Mergellandroute, a tourist route through South Limburg, passes through several places in this municipality.

== Notable people ==
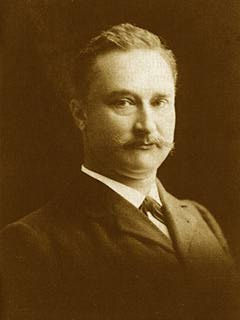
Eugene Dubois

- César-Constantin-François de Hoensbroeck (1724-1792), a German ecclesiastic and prince-bishop of Liège 1784 to 1792
- Eugene Dubois (1858 in Eijsden – 1940), a Dutch paleoanthropologist and geologist, discovered Pithecanthropus erectus - "Java Man"
- Pierre Lardinois (1924 in Noorbeek – 1987), a Dutch politician, diplomat and businessman
- Wil Roebroeks (born 1955 in Sint Geertruid), a professor of Palaeolithic Archaeology at Leiden University

=== Sport ===
- Fons van Wissen (1933 in Margraten – 2015), a Dutch football player with 230 club caps
- Jo Bonfrère (born 1946 in Eijsden), a Dutch football coach and former midfielder with 335 club caps
- Jo Maas (born 1954 in Eijsden), a retired Dutch professional road bicycle racer

== Twin towns — sister cities ==
Eijsden-Margraten is twinned with:

- Clervaux, Luxembourg

== Miscellaneous ==
- In 2013, like in 2009, the brass-band "Koninklijke Harmonie Sainte Cécile)" from Eijsden was the winner in the World Concert Division of the fouryearly World Music Contest, a competition for professional, amateur and military bands, held in Kerkrade.

== Gallery ==
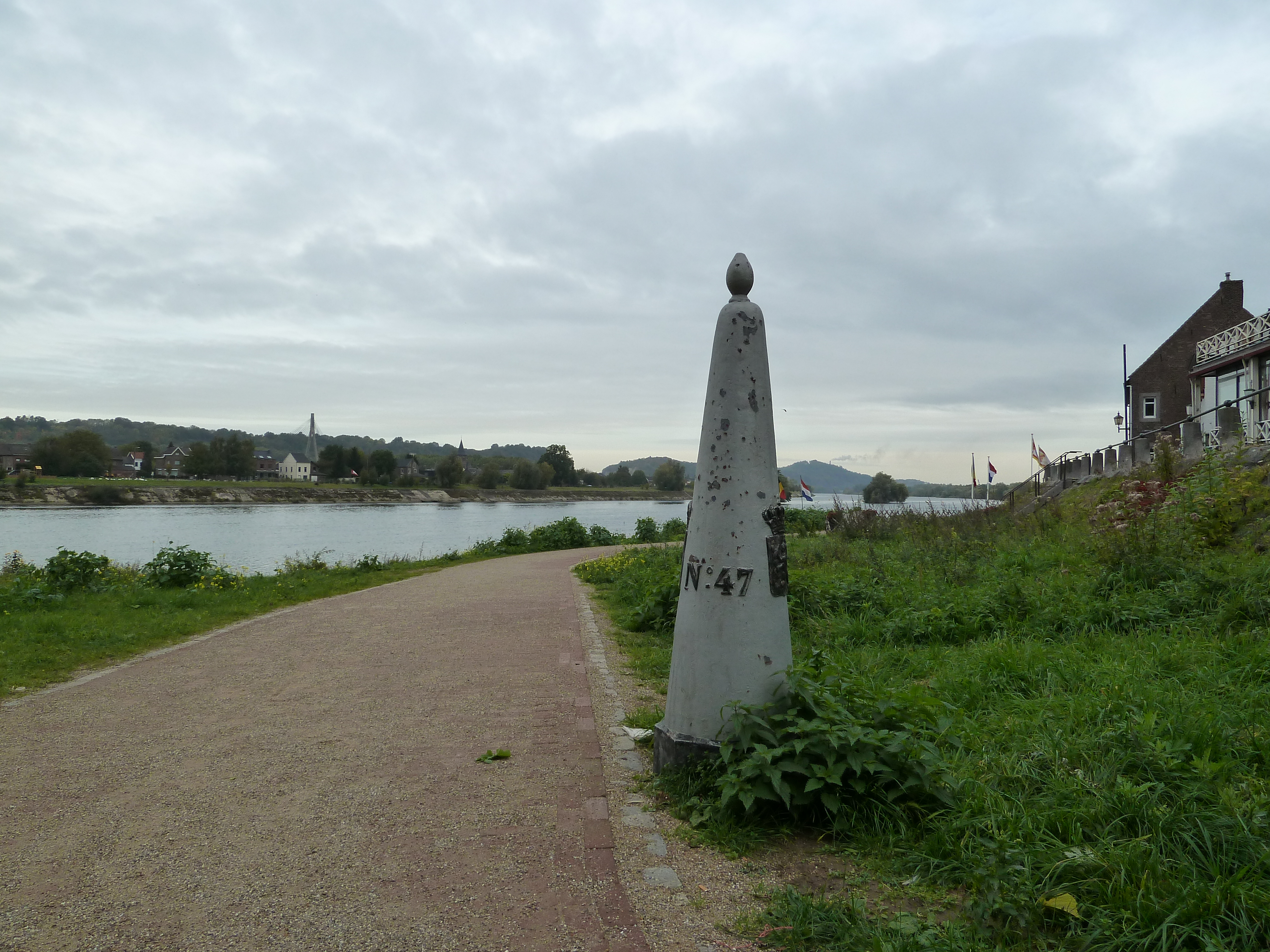
Meuse river entering The Netherlands at Eijsden

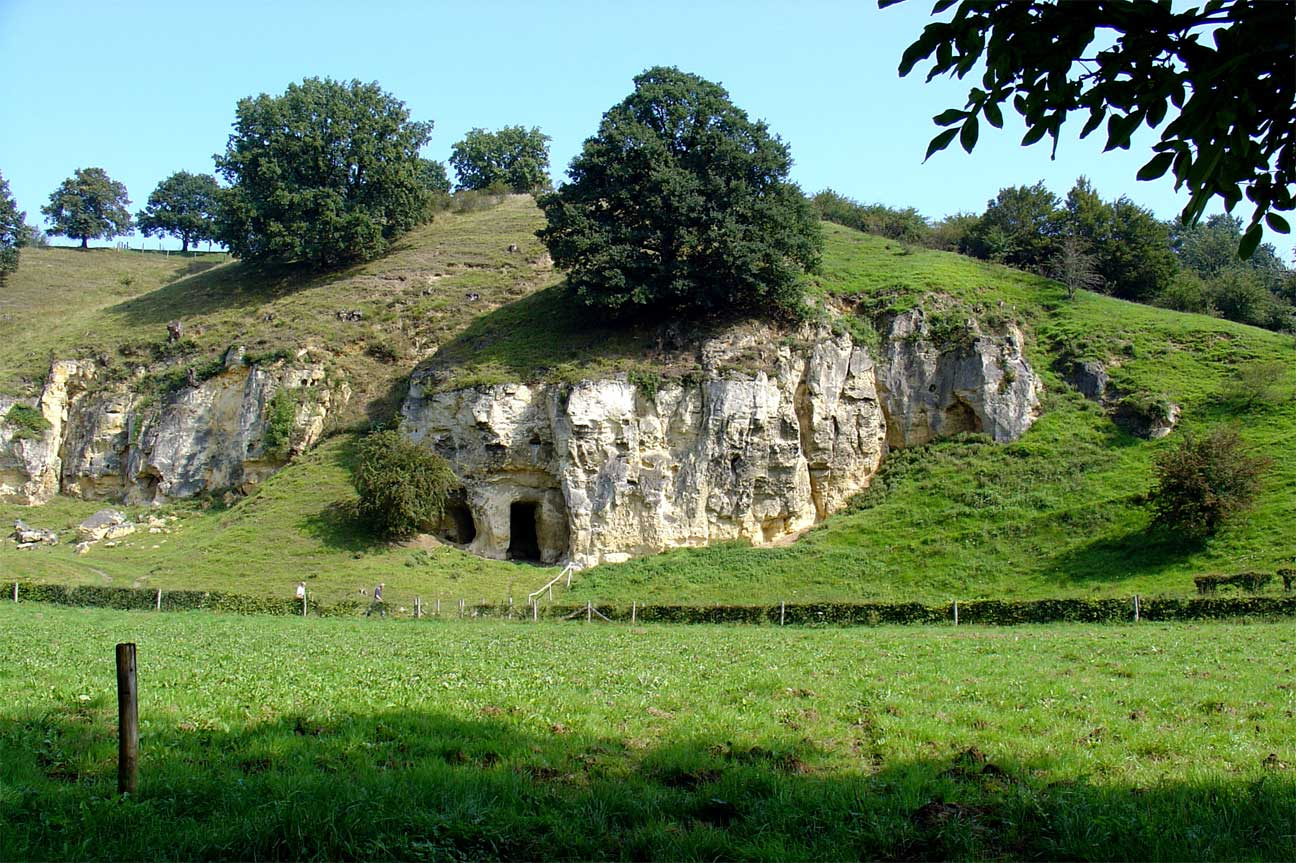
Marl of the Bemelerberg (Bemelen mountain) showing

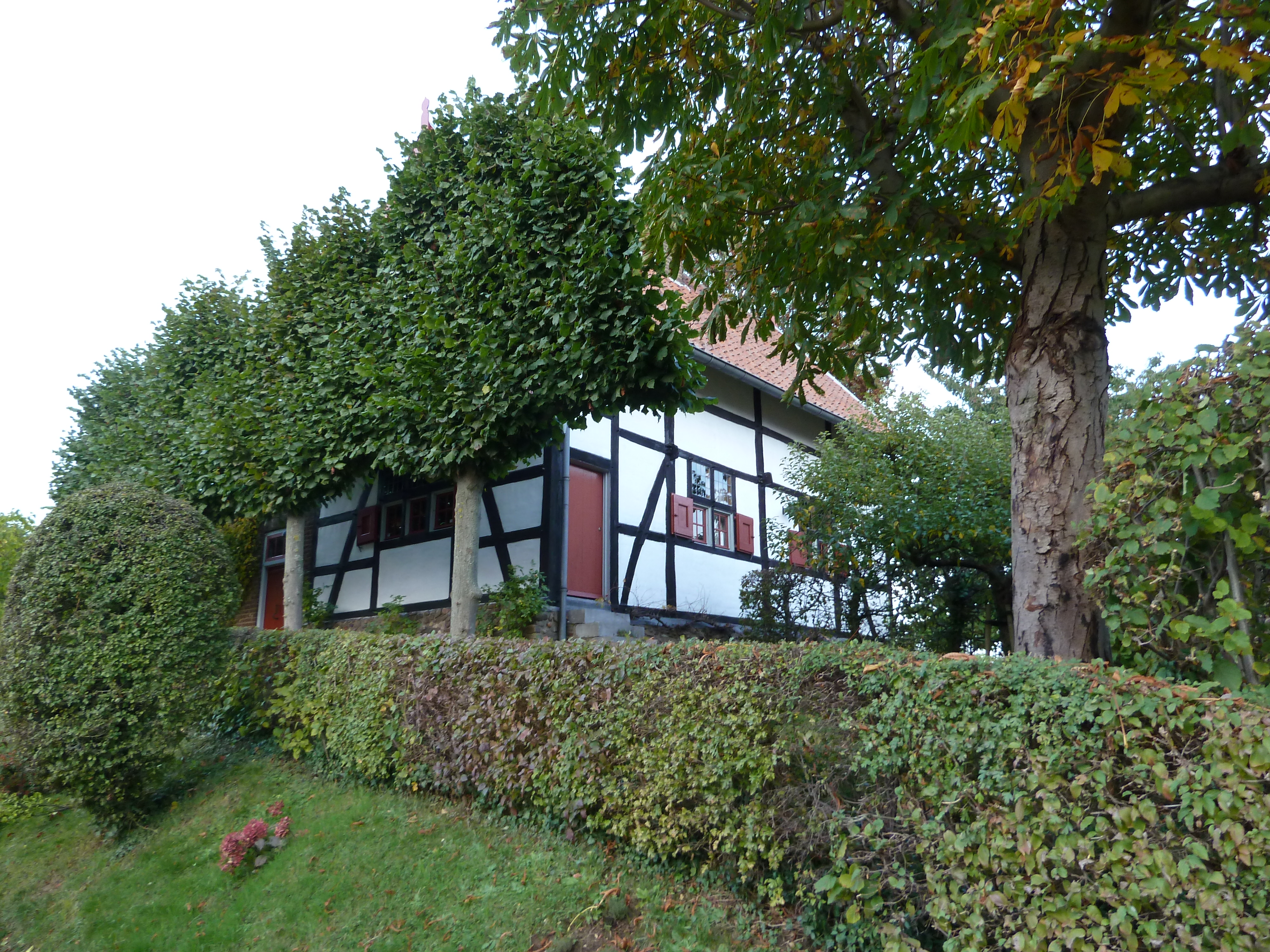
Monumental half-timbered house at Banholt

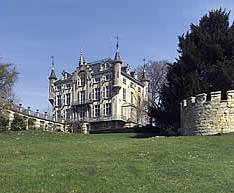
Gronsveld castle

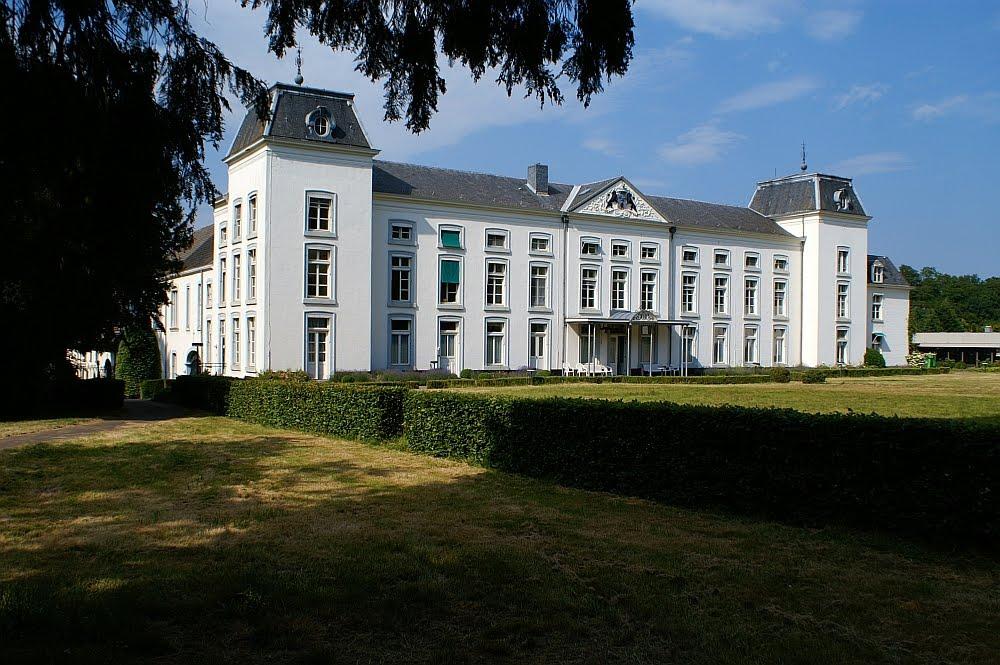
Blankenberg castle at Cadier en Keer

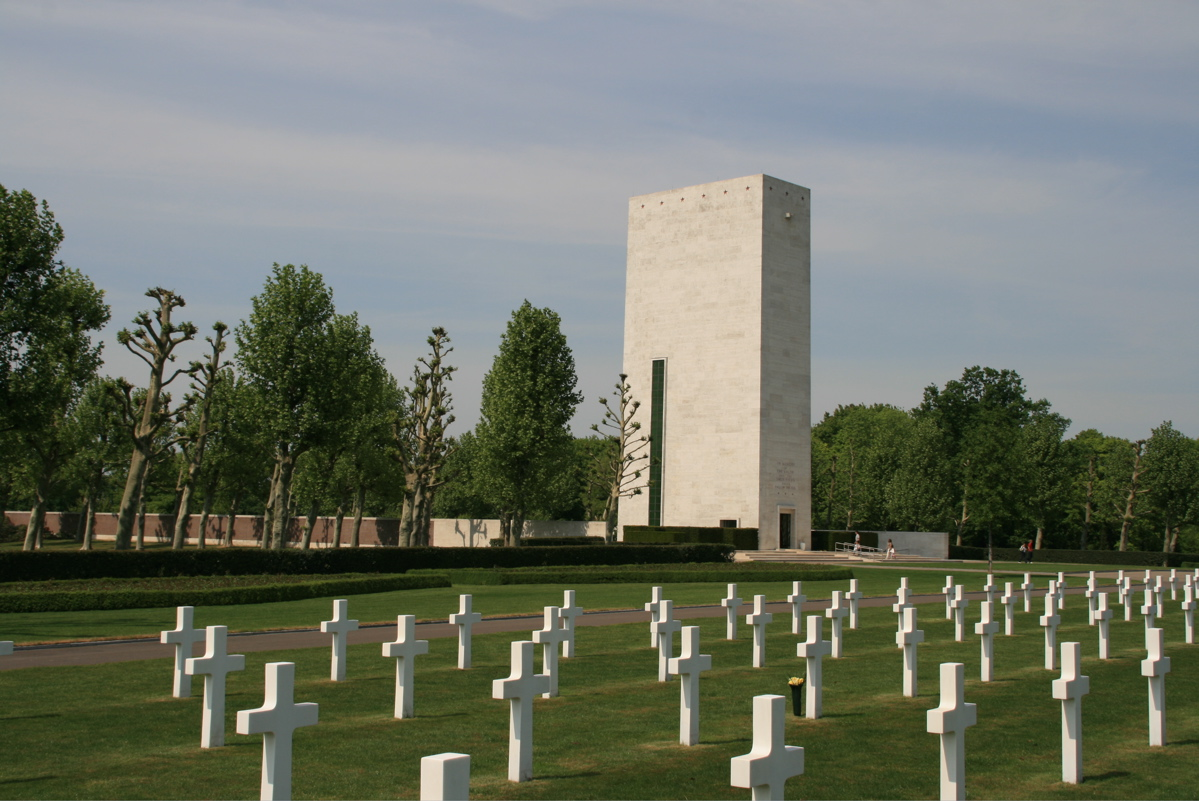
Netherlands American Cemetery and Memorial at Margraten
