= Gronsveld =

Gronsveld Groéselt
- Village
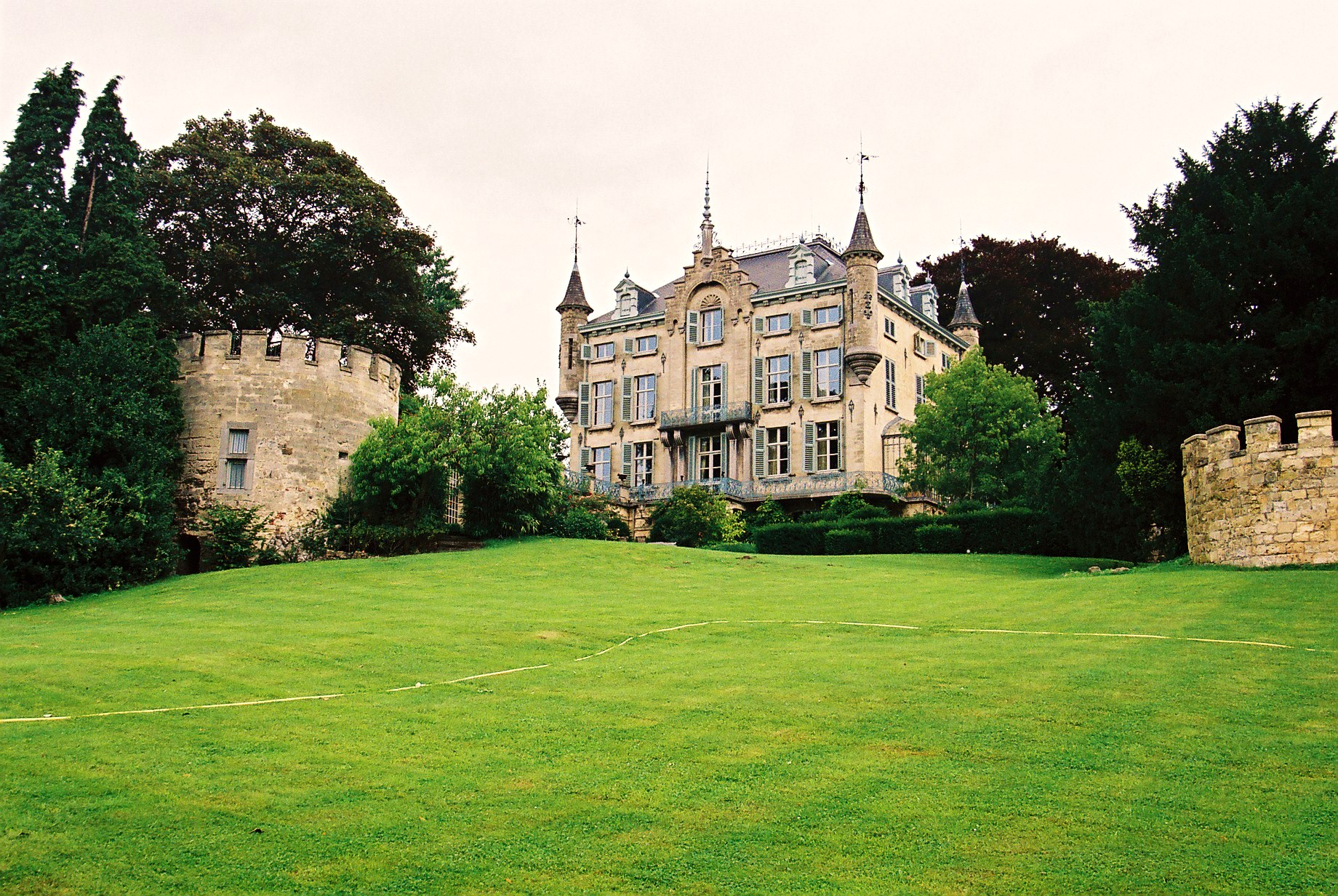
- Gronsveld castle

- Coat of arms

- Location in the Netherlands Location in the province of Limburg in the Netherlands
- Coordinates: 50°48′N 5°43′E
- Country: Netherlands
- Province: Limburg
- Municipality: Eijsden-Margraten

Area
  - Total: 3.21 km^{2} (1.24 sq mi)
- Elevation: 60 m (200 ft)

Population (2021)
  - Total: 2,290
  - Density: 713/km^{2} (1,850/sq mi)
- Time zone: UTC+1 (CET)
  - Summer (DST): UTC+2 (CEST)
- Postal code: 6247
- Dialing code: 043

Gronsveld (Limburgish: Groêselt or Groéselt) is a village in the Dutch province of Limburg. It is part of the municipality of Eijsden-Margraten and situated southeast of the municipality of Maastricht, to which it is bordering.

Gronsveld was a separate municipality until 1982, when it was merged with Eijsden. The municipality also included Rijckholt, Eckelrade, Heugem (now part of Maastricht) and Honthem.

The derivation of the name is uncertain, although it is commonly accepted to be quite literally referring to its evergreen pastures, and indeed the village is favourably situated at the foot of the Margraten Plateau which retains water in its bedrock. This provides for a constant gentle irrigation, and the lush clay soil carried here by the river Meuse is excellent for growing fruit trees.

== History ==
Coat of Arms of the County of Gronsfeld

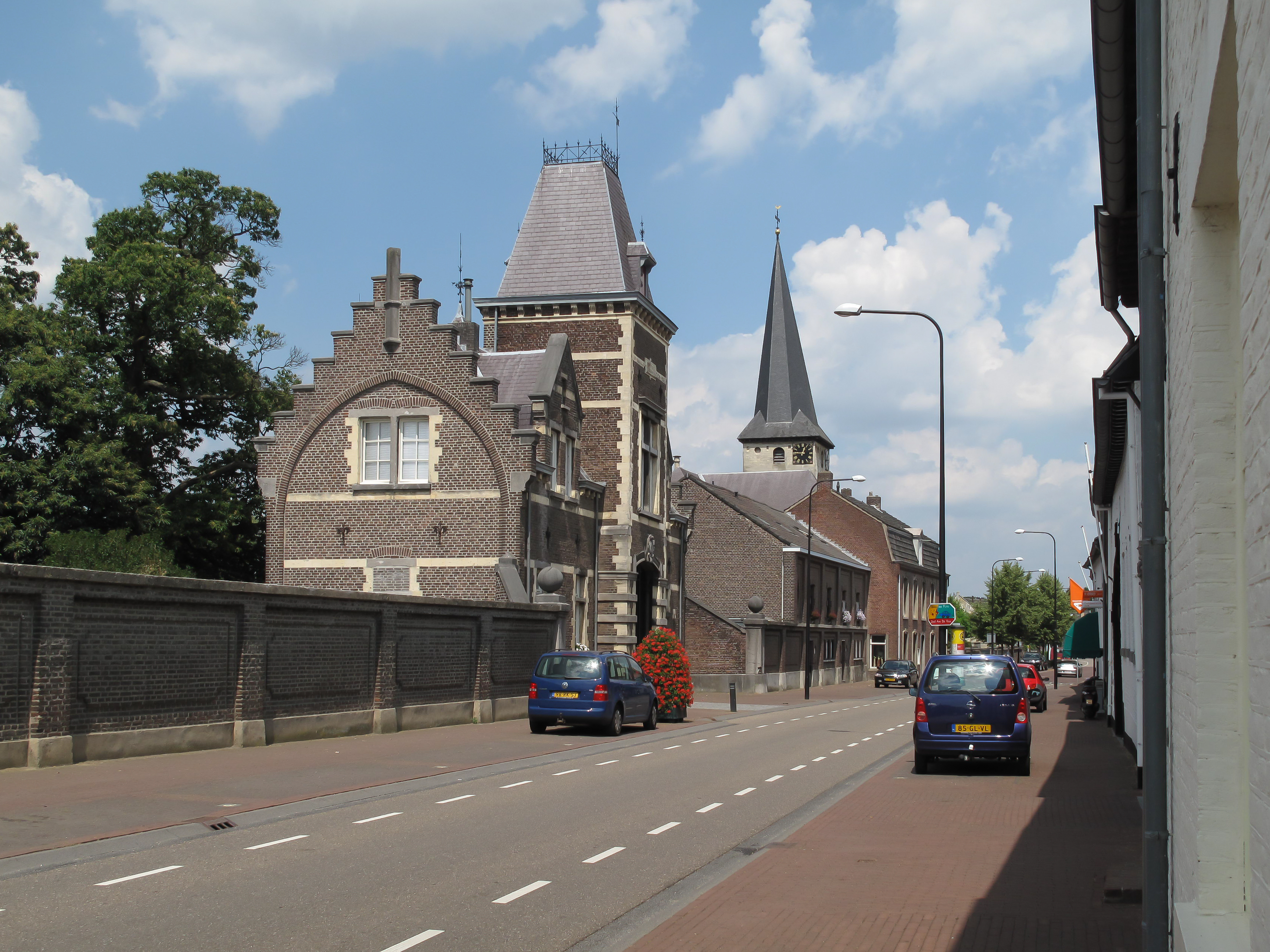
View of the national road right across Gronsveld, that until a few decennia ago was part of the E25 European route

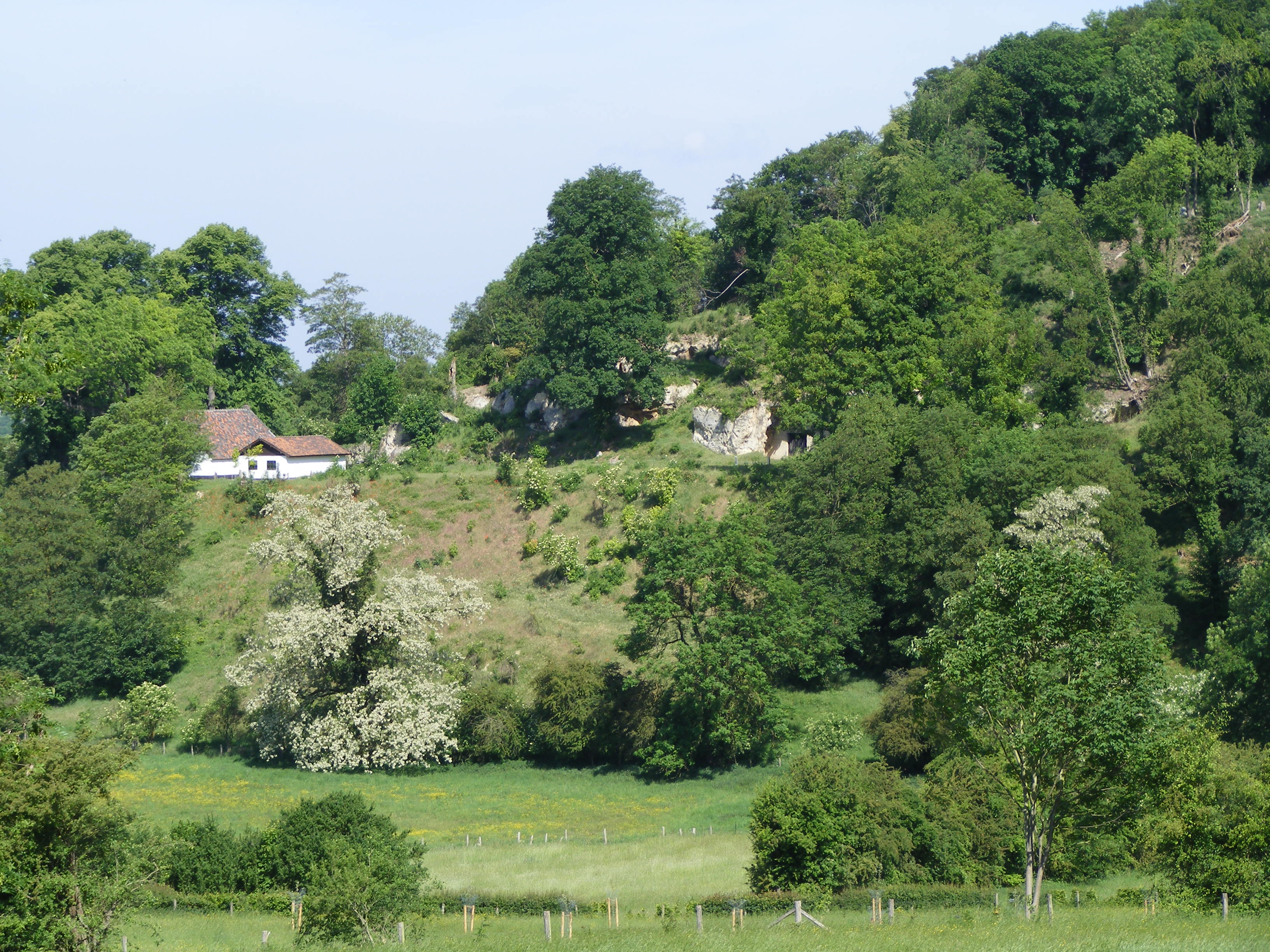
Site at the foot of the Savelsbos hillside forest

Gronsveld used to be an autonomous county until the end of the ancienne regime at the closing of the 18th century and was part of the imperial circle of Westphalia.

Its first and most famous count was Jost Maximilian von Bronckhorst-Gronsfeld (1598-1652) who fought in the Thirty Years' War and invented the Gronsfeld cipher, a substitution cipher.

The Lords, Barons and Counts of Gronsfeld-Diepenbroick had, due to their Imperial immediacy, the right to mint their own coins which were frequently banned from circulation elsewhere because of their insufficient weight and/or alloy.

== Folklore ==
Gronsveld has a rich tradition when it comes to folklore. The local marching band Koninklijke Harmonie van Gronsveld est. 1835 and the Koninklijke Schutterij St. Sebastianus (= historic 'army') est. 1619 are the most well known parts of this.

Also, every year the village celebrates the traditional bronck, which dates back to the Middle Ages when the people of the village would honour God in order to get a good harvest. The village is then ruled by a king and his queen. Every four years (most recent occurrence 2004) this position is 'battled' for. Who will be king is determined on Pentecost Monday by a contest where the candidates take turns shooting a wooden bird atop a long pole on the church square. Whoever manages to shoot the bird down will be king. Two weeks after Pentecost the actual celebrations start. During these three days (Sunday, Monday and Tuesday) the king and his army make their way through the whole village clearing road blocks (put there as a reminder of the problems they ran into in the old days) along the way. On Sunday there is also a mass and procession through the village. Two weeks after these celebrations, the king and queen treat the whole village to a so-called 'koffietafel' (literally: coffee table). Which includes drinks and the traditional limburgish pastry vlaai.

== Sights ==
Historic buildings in Gronsveld include the castle and the church built in the 18th century. Another landmark of the village is the Savelsbos, a protected hillside forest.

== Gallery ==
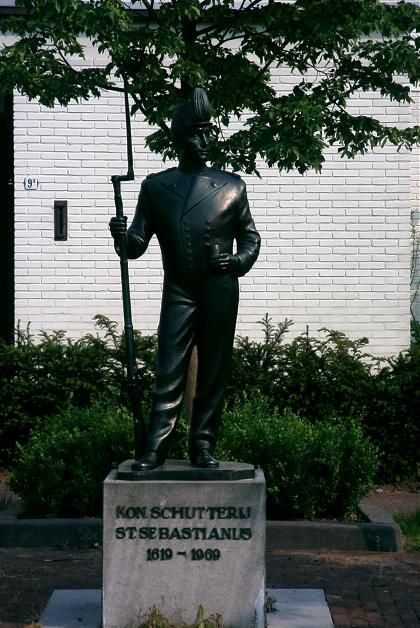
'The Grenedeer' statue

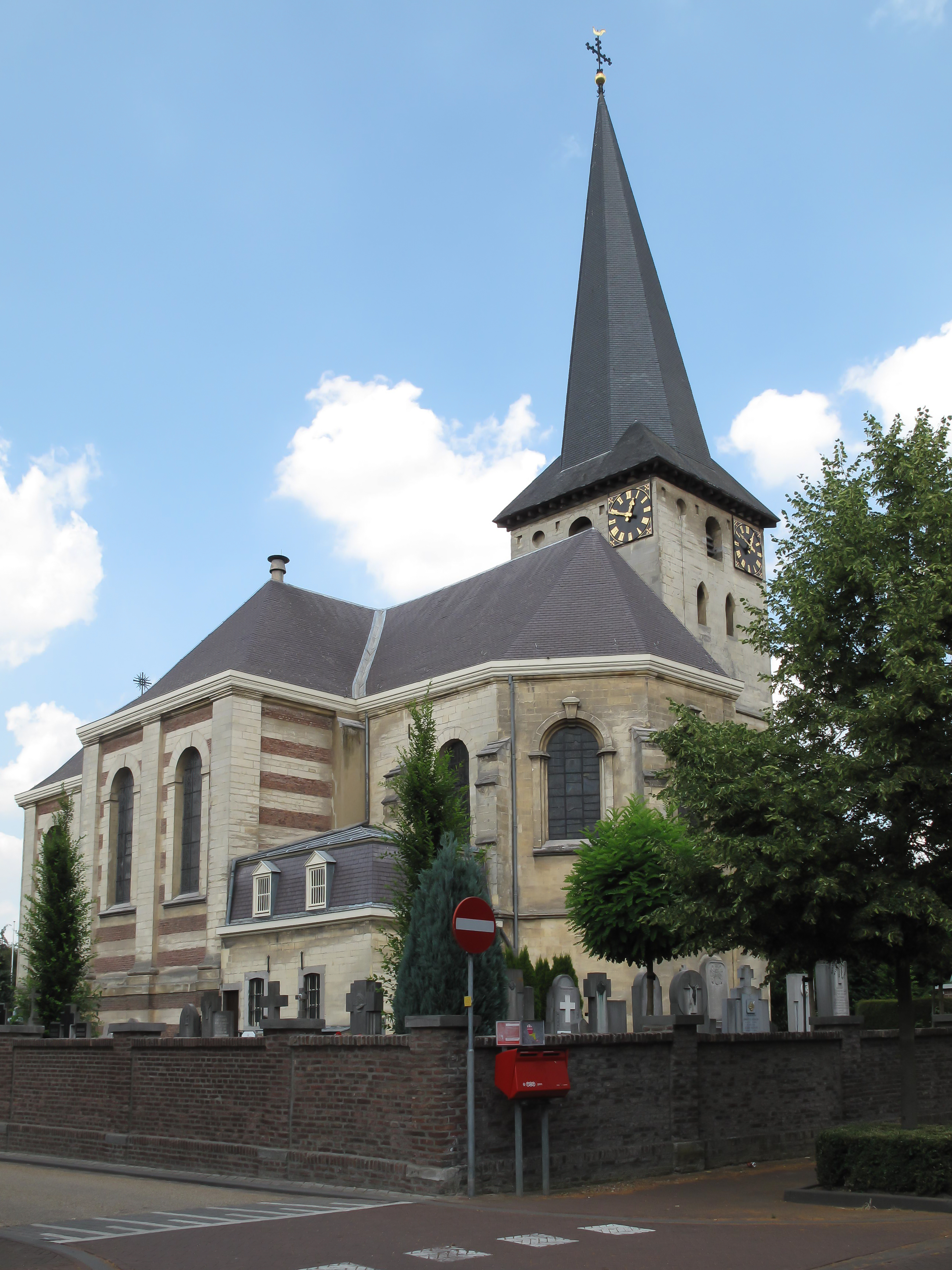
Gronsveld church

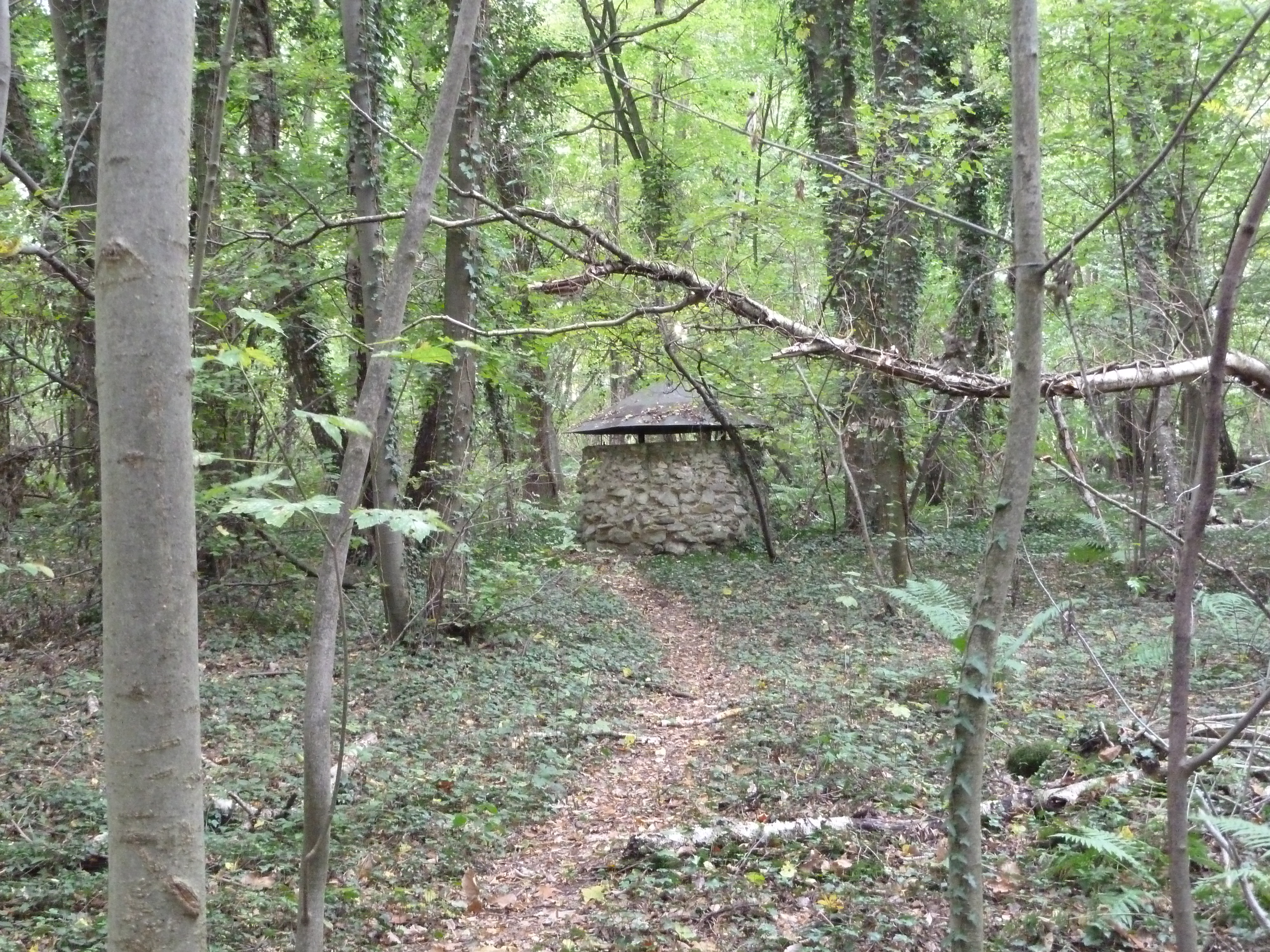
Above-ground relic of flintstone mine in forest near Gronsveld
