= Rijckholt =

- Village
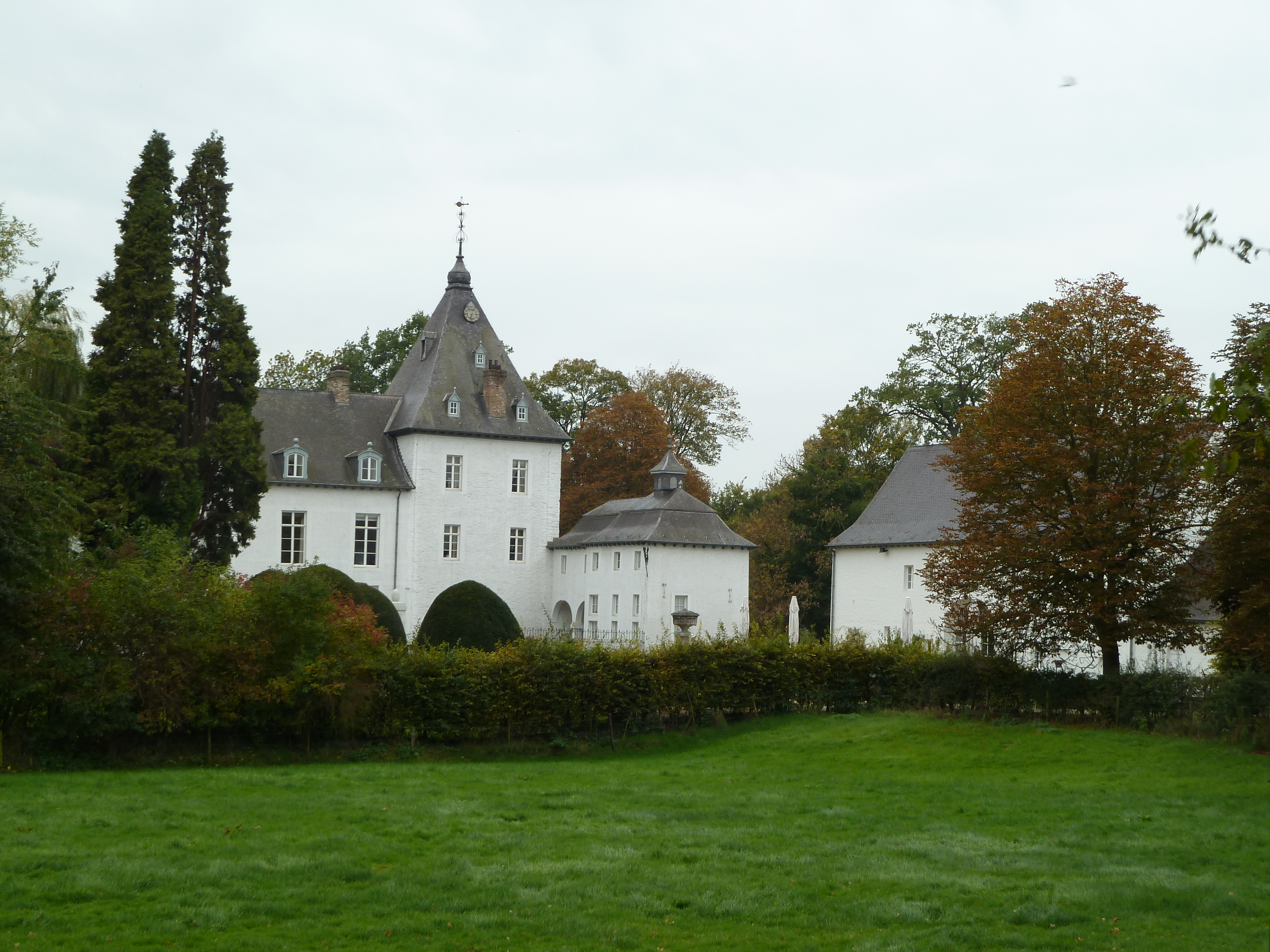
- Rijckholt castle

- Location in the Netherlands Location in the province of Limburg in the Netherlands
- Coordinates: 50°47′55″N 5°43′55″E
- Country: Netherlands
- Province: Limburg
- Municipality: Eijsden-Margraten

Area
  - Total: 0.62 km^{2} (0.24 sq mi)
- Elevation: 60 m (200 ft)

Population (2021)
  - Total: 630
  - Density: 1,000/km^{2} (2,600/sq mi)
- Time zone: UTC+1 (CET)
  - Summer (DST): UTC+2 (CEST)
- Postal code: 6247
- Dialing code: 043
- Major roads: A2

Rijckholt (Limburgish: Riêkelt) is a village in the Dutch province of Limburg. It is located in the municipality of Eijsden-Margraten.

== History ==
The village was first mentioned in 1330 as Rykilt, and means "mighty forest". Rijckholt developed in the Early Middle Ages in the valley of the Maas. In the 12th century, it became a free heerlijkheid (=no fief) and in the 16th century until 1794, a barony.

Rijckholt castle is surrounded by a double moat. The square tower dates from the 14th century. It was destroyed in 1485 and rebuilt in 1489. The main wing was constructed 1683.

The Catholic Our Lady of Immaculate Conception Church was built in 1882 as a monastery church of the Dominicans from Lyon. In 1956, it became the village church. The monastery closed down in 1979.

Rijckholt was home to 185 people in 1840. It was a separate municipality until 1943, when it was merged with Gronsveld. In 2011, it became part of the municipality of Eijsden-Margraten.

== Sights ==
- Rijckholt castle
- Prehistoric flint mines

== Gallery ==
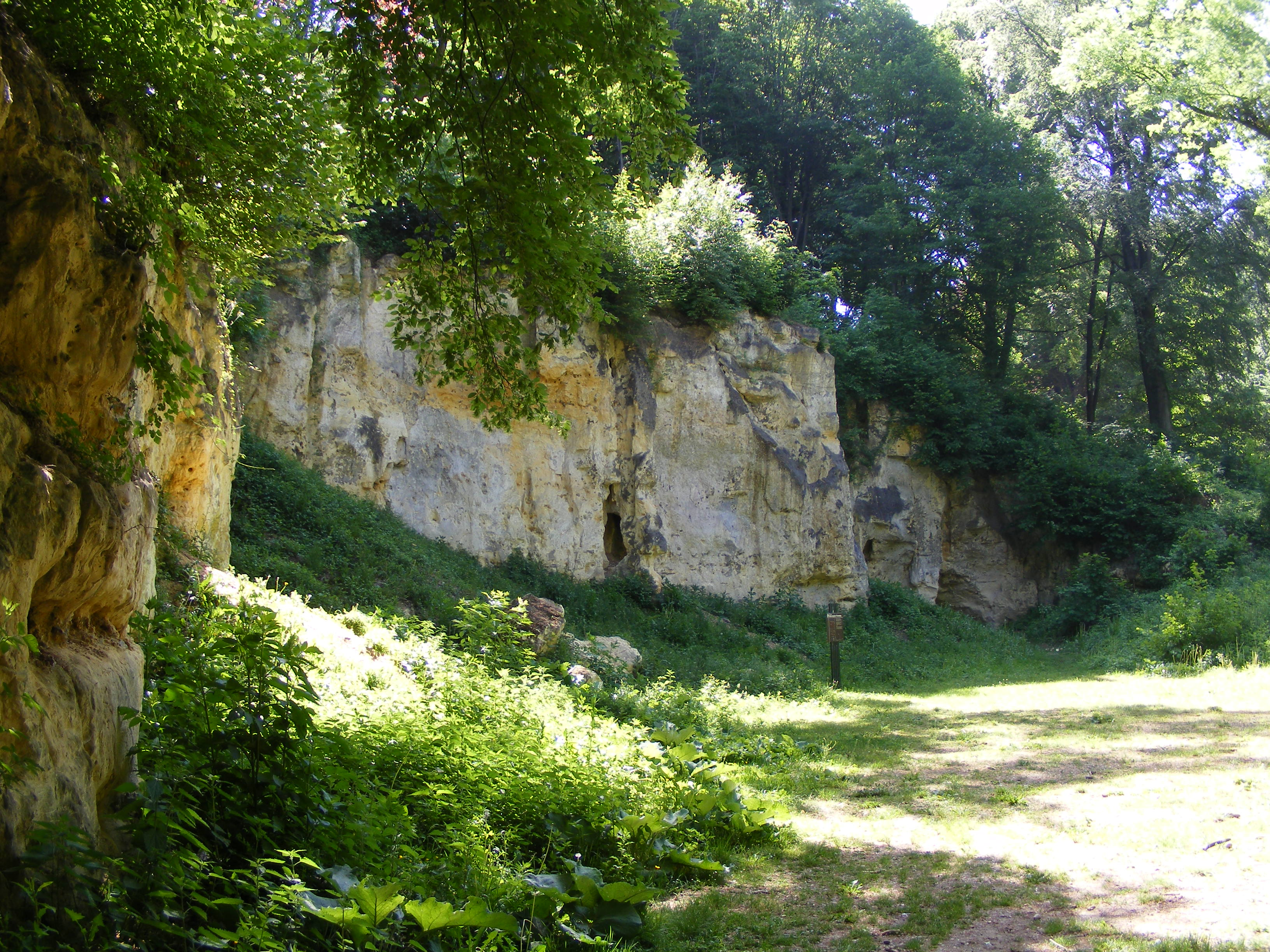
Marl wall in Savelsbos forest

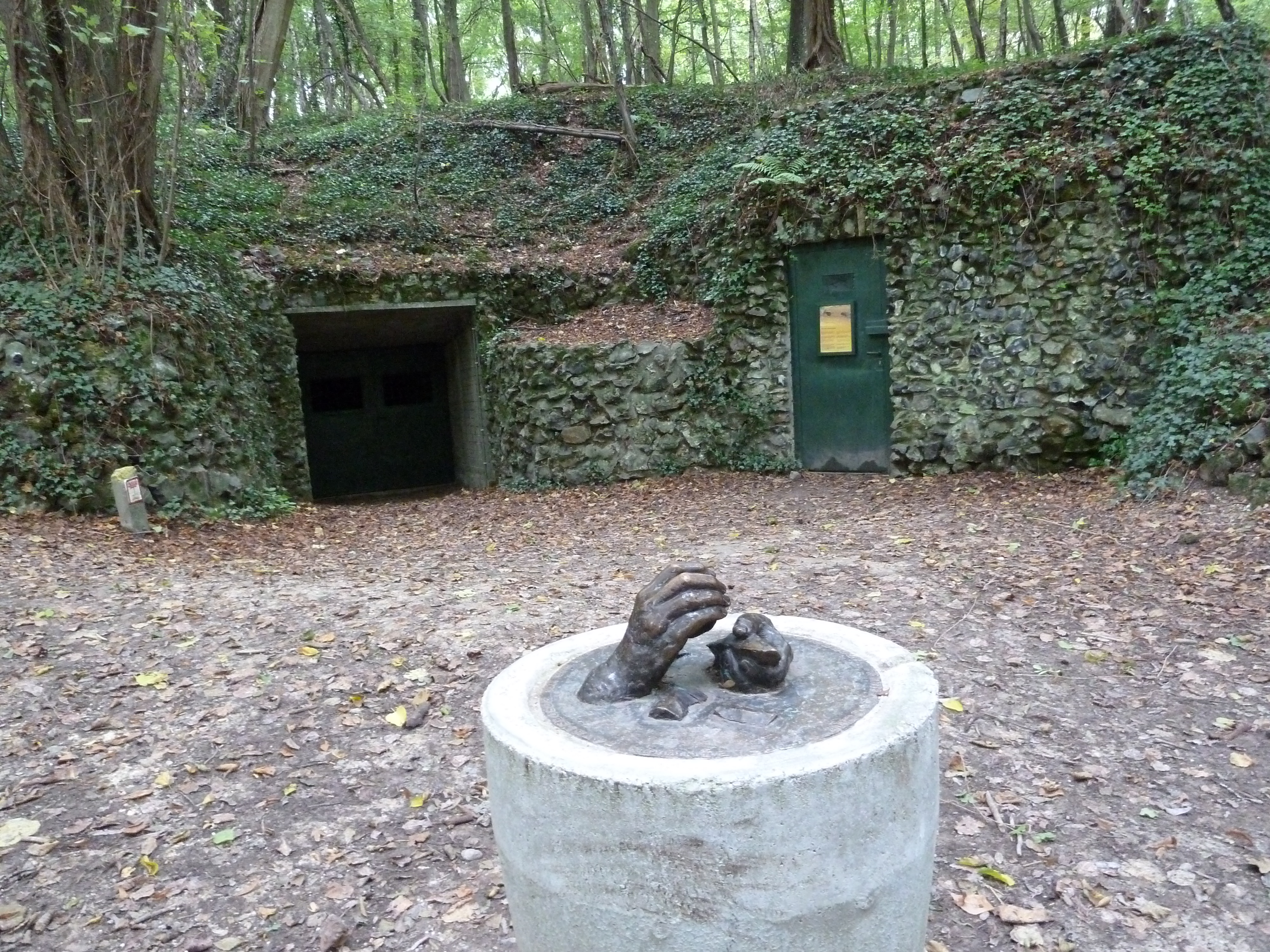
Entrance prehistoric flintstone mine in Savelsbos forest

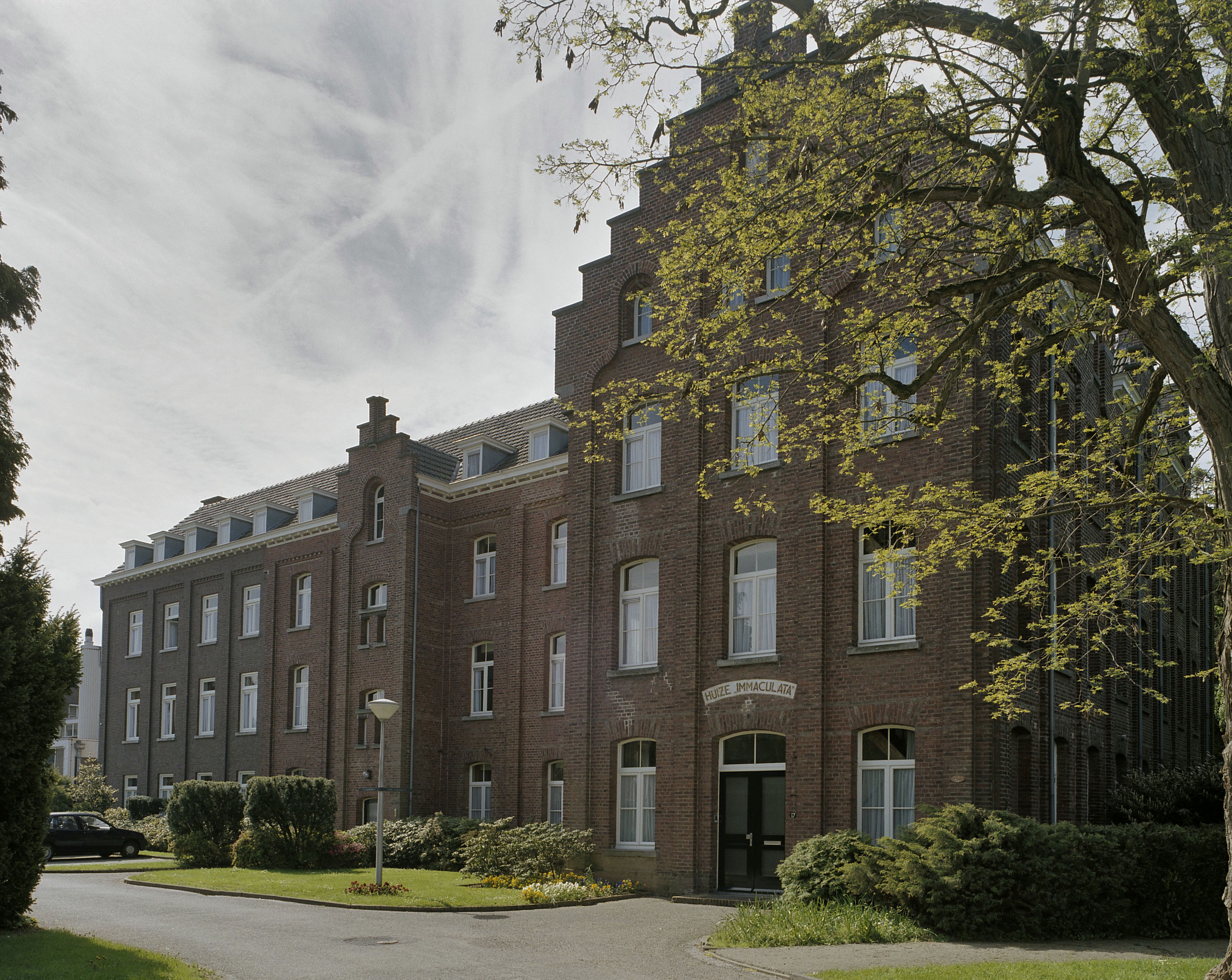
Monastery Huize Immaculata

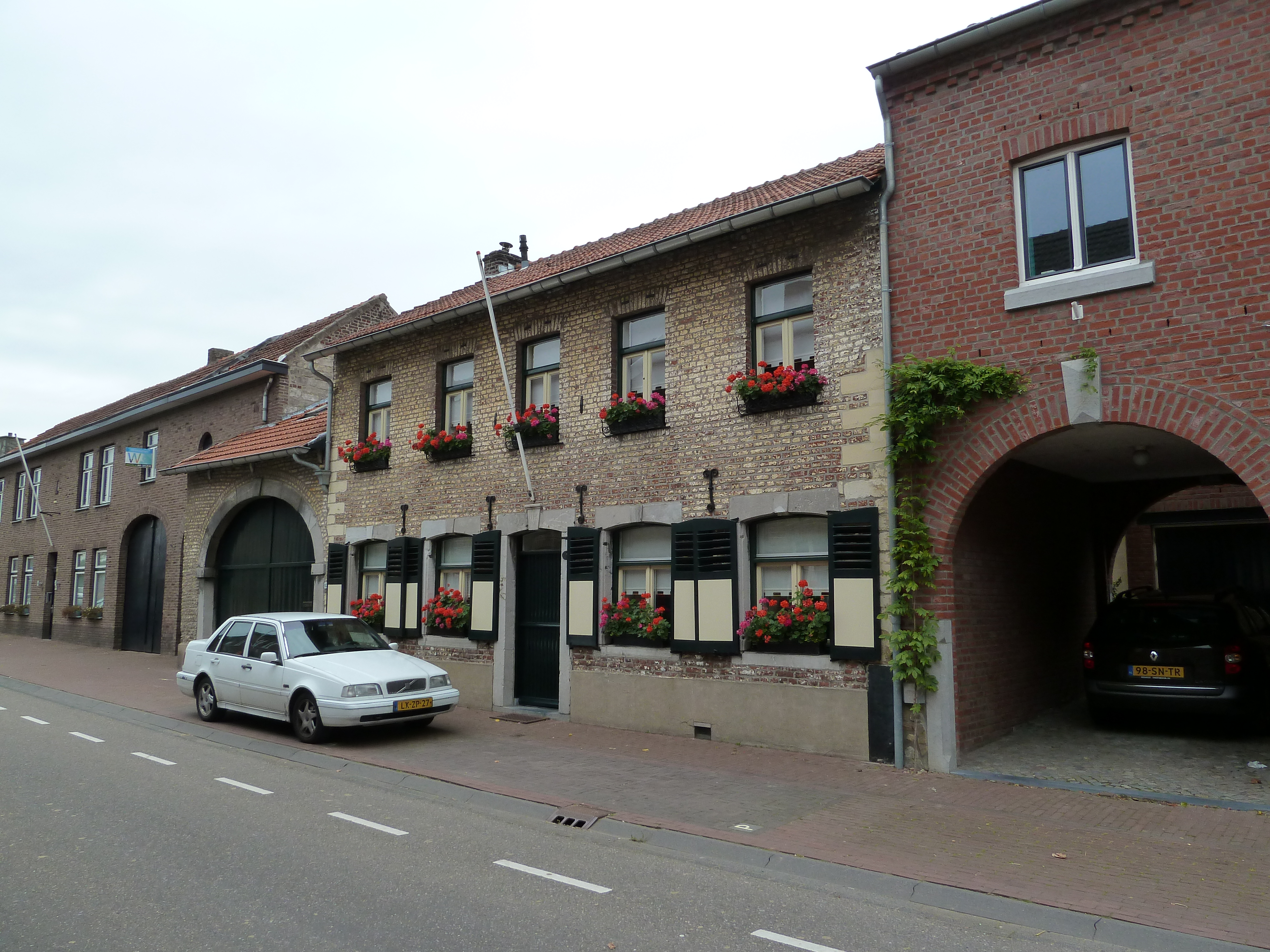
Street view
