= Bemelen =

Bemelen Bieëmele
- Village
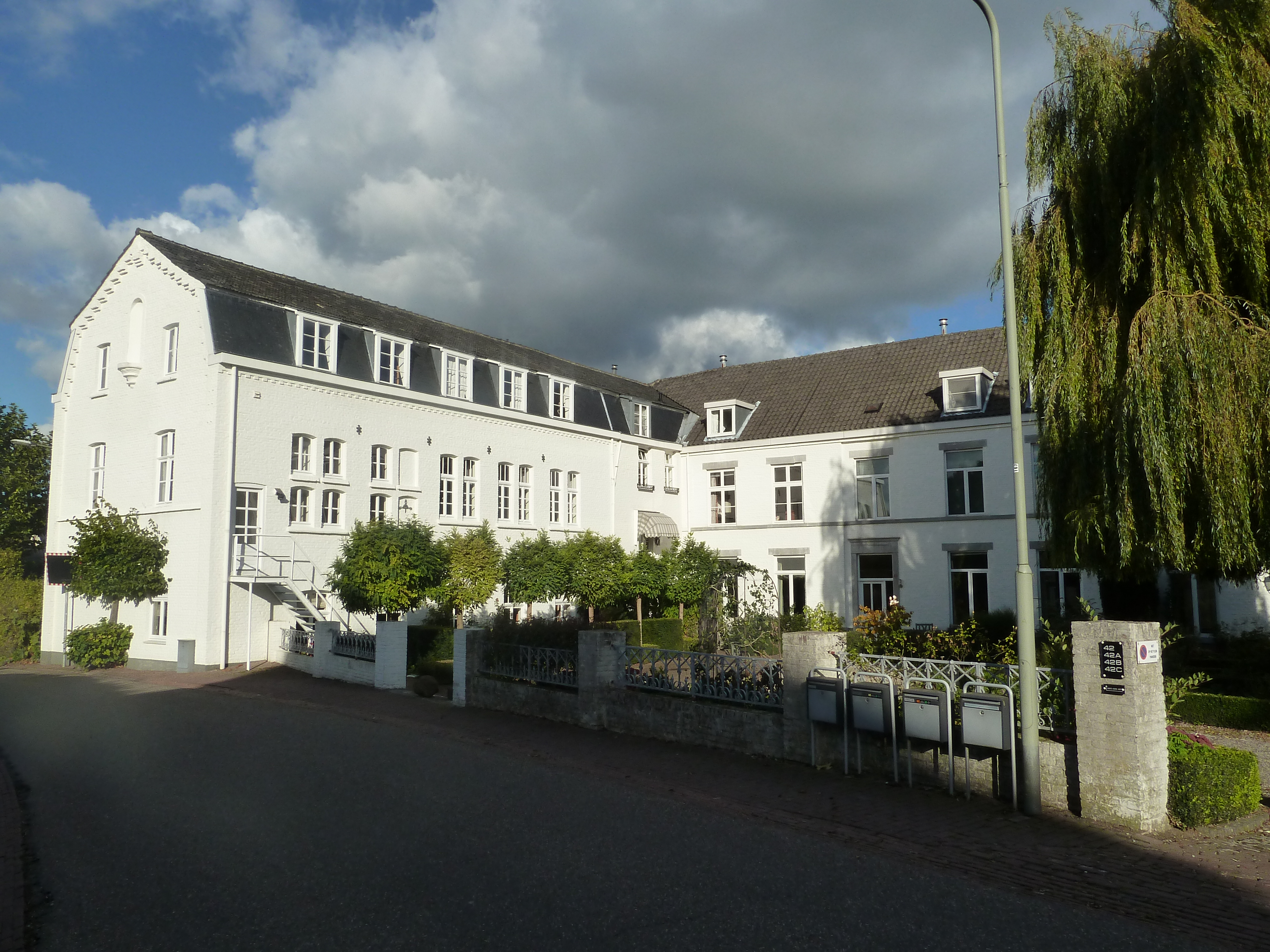
- Former monastery Europahuis

- Flag Coat of arms

- Location in the Netherlands Location in the province of Limburg in the Netherlands
- Coordinates: 50°50′50″N 5°45′50″E
- Country: Netherlands
- Province: Limburg (Netherlands)
- Municipality: Eijsden-Margraten

Area
  - Total: 1.43 km^{2} (0.55 sq mi)
- Elevation: 104 m (341 ft)

Population (2021)
  - Total: 350
  - Density: 240/km^{2} (630/sq mi)
- Time zone: UTC+1 (CET)
  - Summer (DST): UTC+2 (CEST)
- Postal code: 6268
- Dialing code: 043

Bemelen (Dutch pronunciation: [ˈbeːmələ(n)]; Limburgish: Bieëmele [ˈbiəmələ]) is a village in the Dutch province of Limburg. It is part of the municipality of Eijsden-Margraten, and lies about 5 km east of Maastricht.

The village was first mentioned in 1096 as Bemele. The etymology is unknown. Bemelen is a village on the eastern flank of the Maas valley along the Roman road from Maastricht to Aachen. Until 1794, it was a heerlijkheid of the Chapter of Our Lady in Maastricht.

The Catholic St Laurentius Church is a single aisled church. The tower has 12th century elements. The church was replaced in 1845 by a neoclassical building.

Bemelen was home to 138 people in 1840. Until 1982, Bemelen was a separate municipality, after which it became part of the municipality Margraten, which fused with municipality Eijsden in 2011 to form Eijsden-Margraten.

== Gallery ==
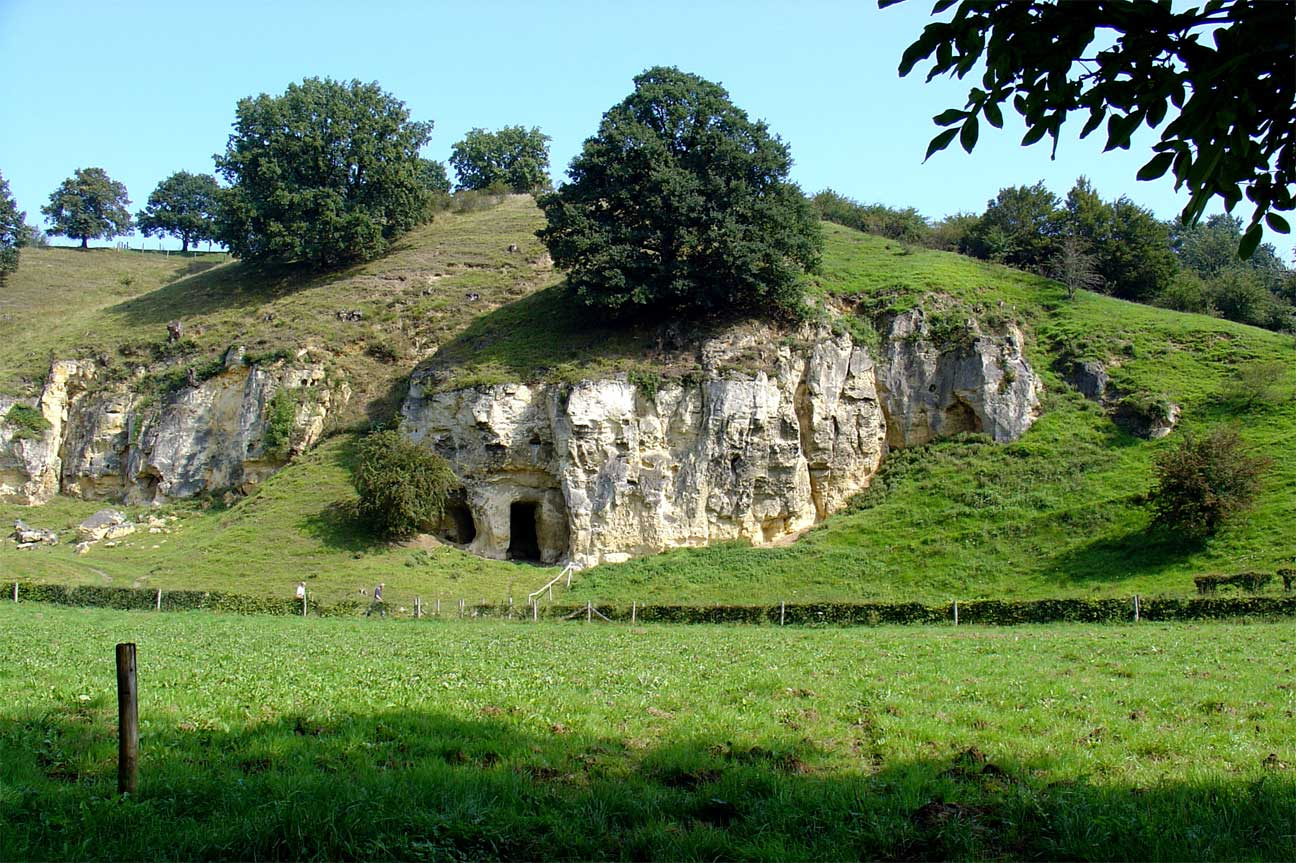
Marl of the Bemelerberg (Bemelen mountain) showing

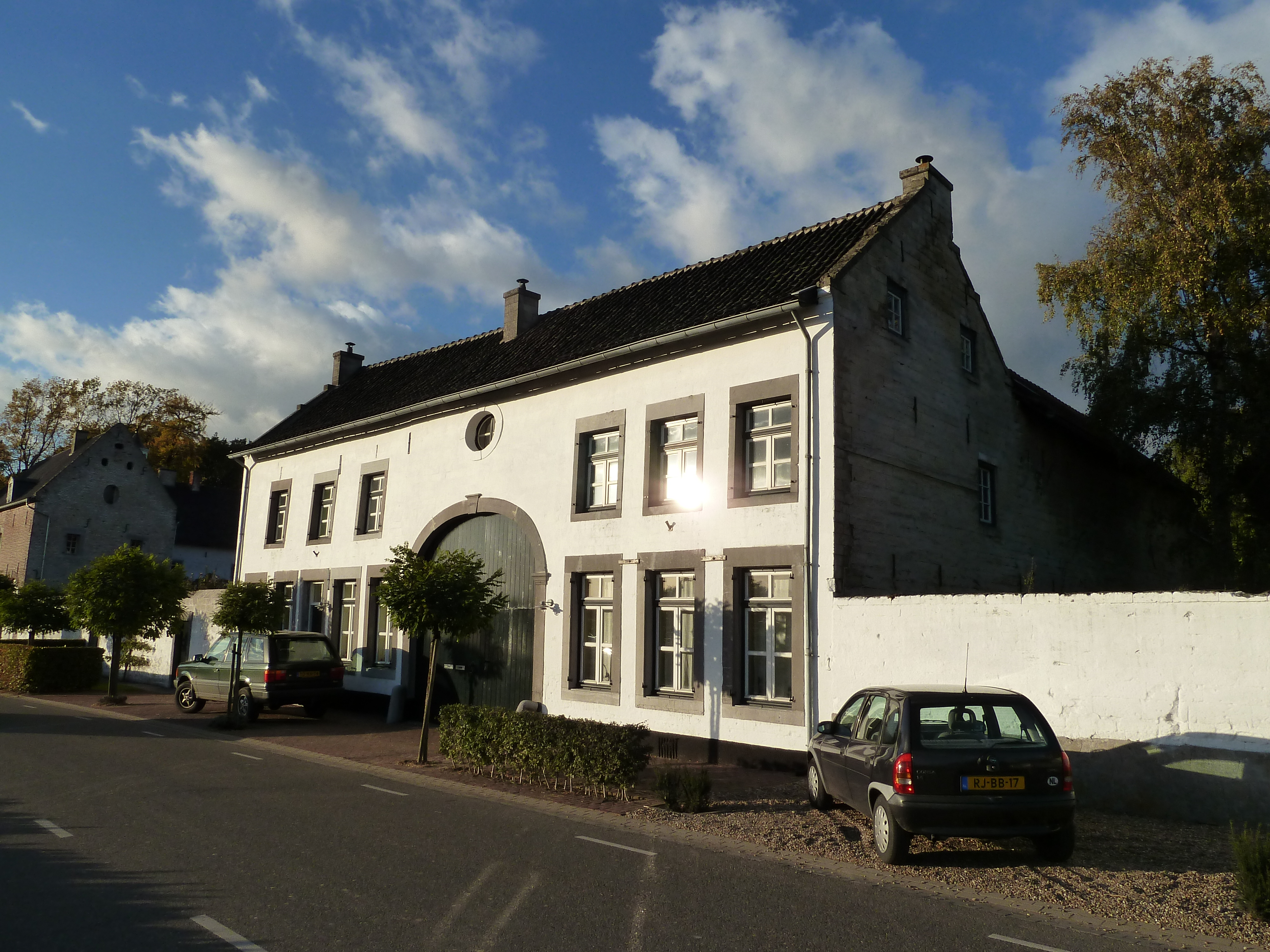
Monumental building at Bemelen-Gasthuis

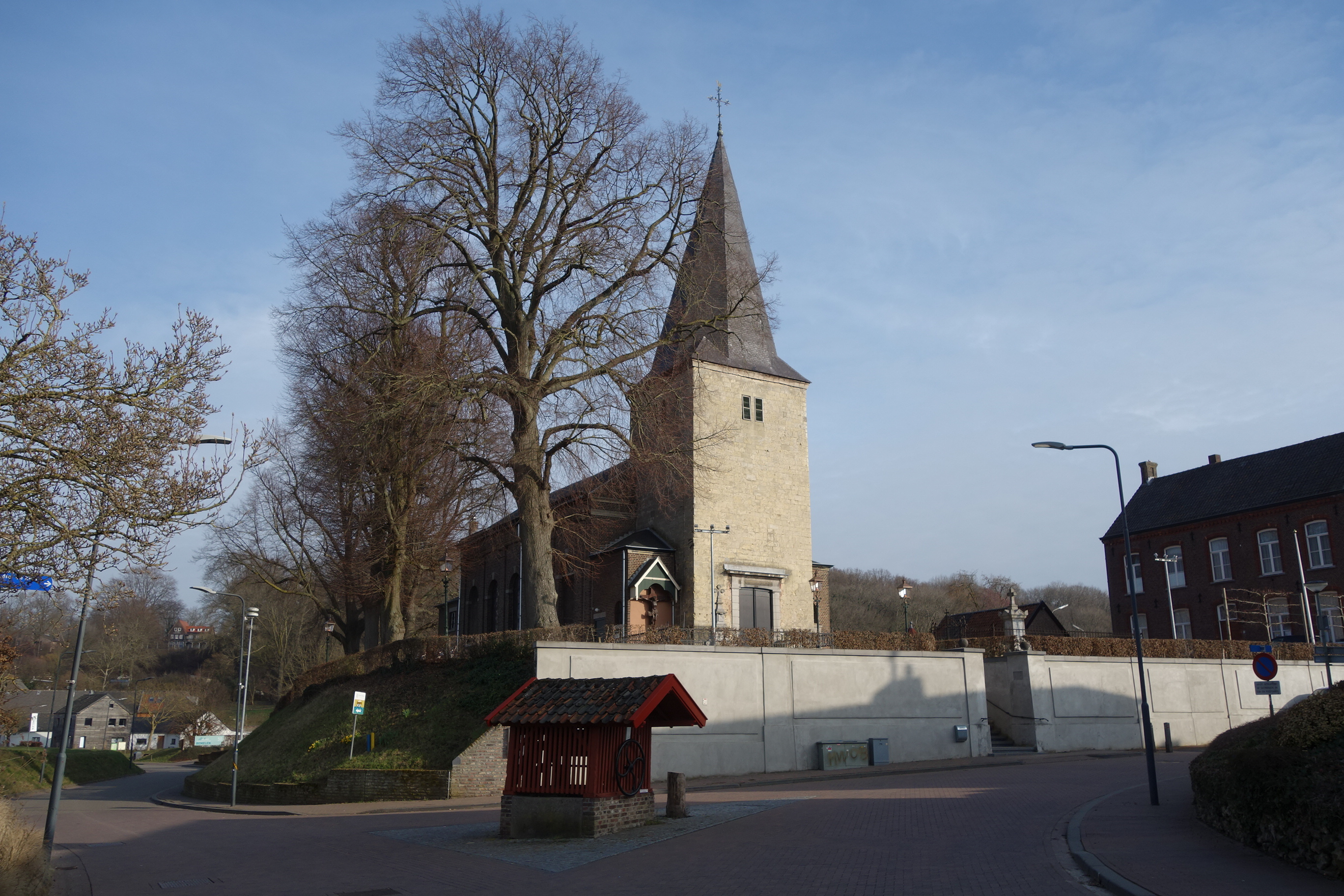
Church and water well

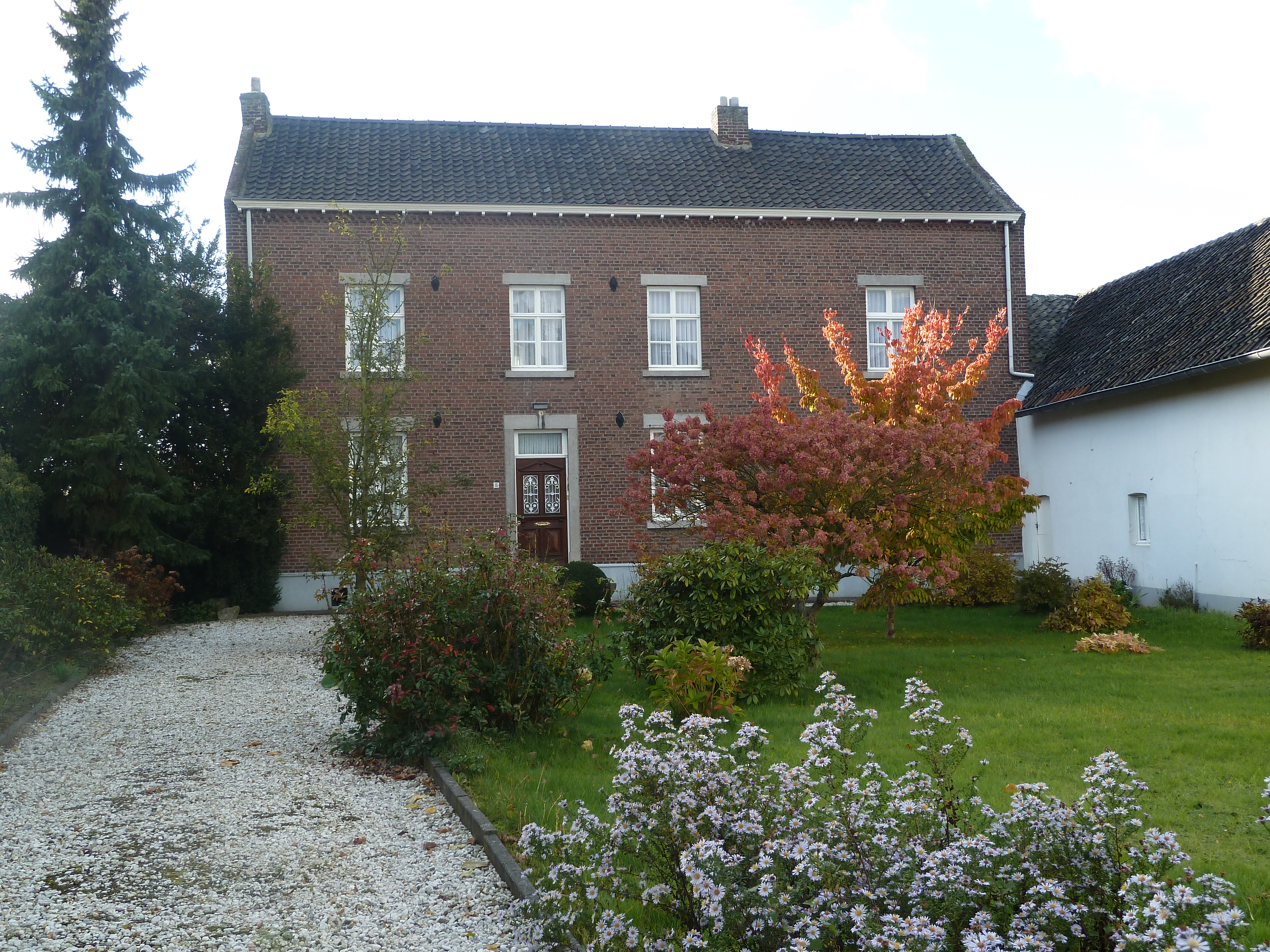
House in Bemelen
