= Fons van Wissen =

Dutch footballer

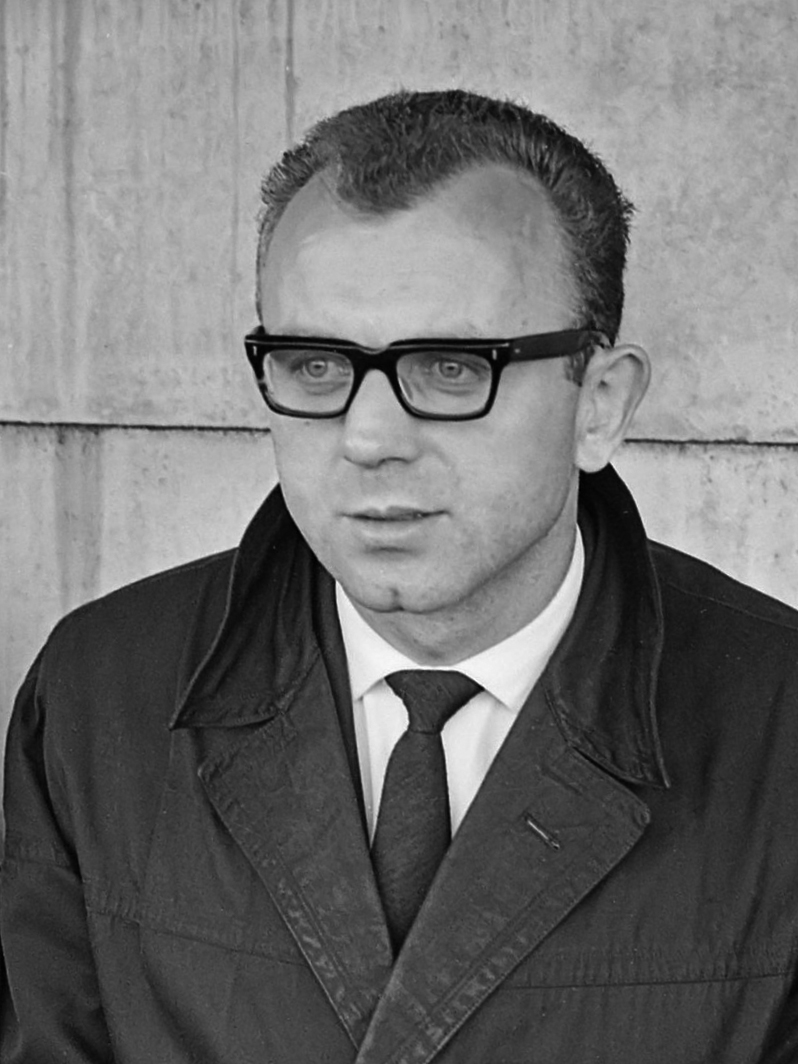

Personal information
- Full name: Gerardus Jacobus Alphonsus van Wissen
- Date of birth: 21 March 1933
- Place of birth: Margraten, Netherlands
- Date of death: 7 July 2015 (aged 82)
- Place of death: Netherlands
- Position: Midfielder

Youth career
- RKVVM

Senior career*
Years	Team	Apps	(Gls)
1951–1958	MVV	62	(4)
1958–1967	PSV	230	(25)
1967–1969	Helmond Sport		

International career
1957–1964	Netherlands	30	(4)
- * Club domestic league appearances and goals

Fons van Wissen (21 March 1933 – 7 July 2015) was a Dutch football player.

== Club career ==
Van Wissen made his senior debut at 15 years of age at local amateur side RKVVM and joined MVV Maastricht in 1951. He moved to PSV Eindhoven in 1958 and won the 1963 Eredivisie title with the club after beating Ajax 5-2 despite Van Wissen playing while injured. He skippered the team for two years.

He finished his career with Helmond Sport.

== International career ==
He made his debut for the Netherlands in an April 1957 friendly match against Belgium and has earned a total of 30 caps, scoring 4 goals. He represented his country in 4 FIFA World Cup qualification matches.

His final international was an October 1964 FIFA World Cup qualification match against Albania. He decided to quit international football after being struck by poverty in Albania.

=== International goals ===
Scores and results list the Netherlands' goal tally first.

#	Date	Venue	Opponent	Score	Result	Competition
1	17 November 1957	De Kuip, Rotterdam, Netherlands	Belgium	1–0	5–2	Friendly match
2	13 April 1958	Bosuilstadion, Antwerp, Belgium	Belgium	2–0	7–1	Friendly match
3	23 April 1958	De Kuip, Rotterdam, Netherlands	Curaçao	6–0	8–1	Friendly match
4	23 April 1958	De Kuip, Rotterdam, Netherlands	Curaçao	7–0	8–1	Friendly match

== Retirement and death ==
After retiring, Van Wissen owned a sports shop in Eindhoven. He died in July 2015.
