= Eckelrade =

Eckelrade Ikkelder
- Village
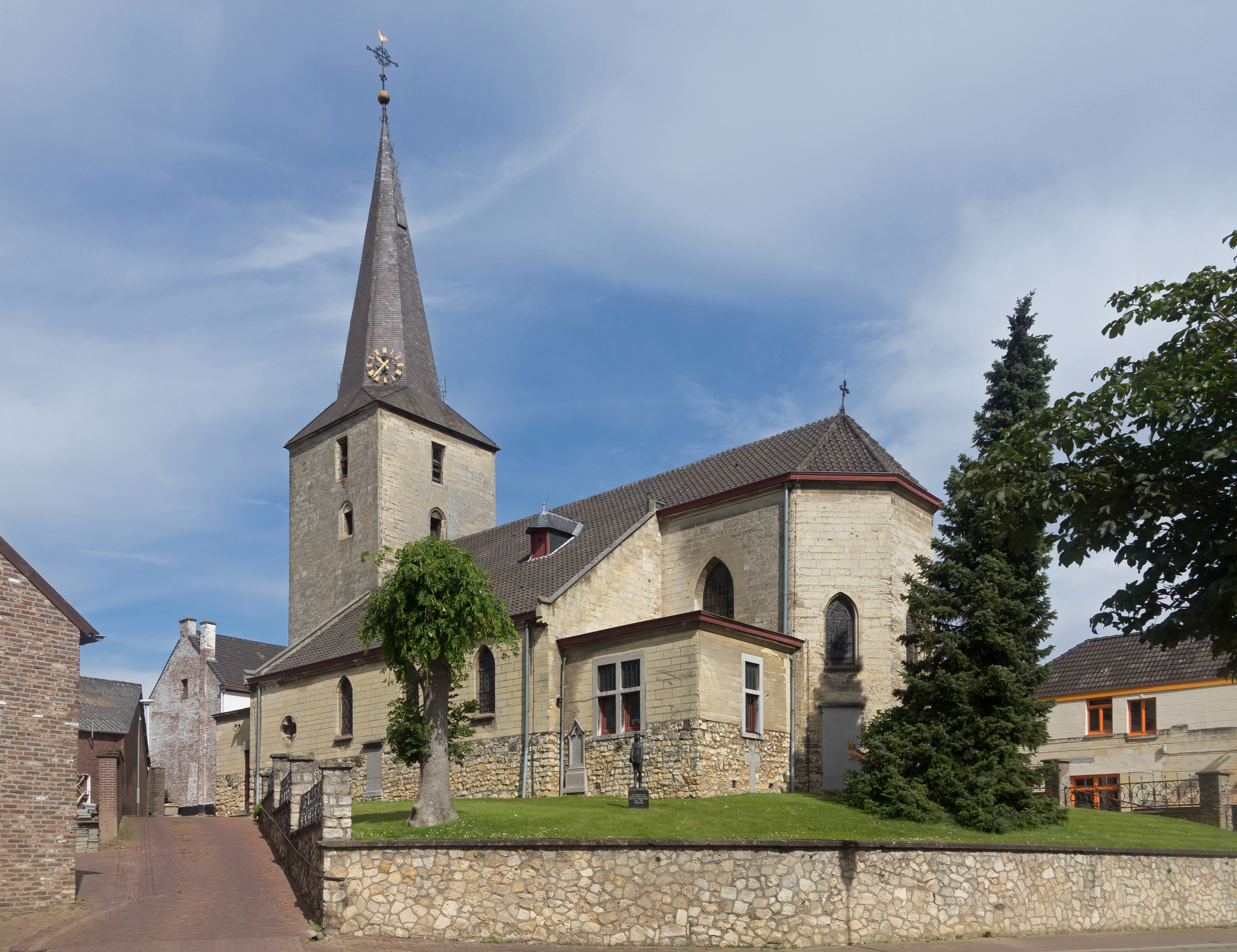
- St Bartholomeus Church

- Location in the Netherlands Location in the province of Limburg in the Netherlands
- Coordinates: 50°48′24″N 5°45′56″E
- Country: Netherlands
- Province: Limburg
- Municipality: Eijsden-Margraten

Area
  - Total: 1.17 km^{2} (0.45 sq mi)
- Elevation: 140 m (460 ft)

Population (2021)
  - Total: 565
  - Density: 483/km^{2} (1,250/sq mi)
- Time zone: UTC+1 (CET)
  - Summer (DST): UTC+2 (CEST)
- Postal code: 6251
- Dialing code: 043

Eckelrade (Limburgish: Ikkelder) is a village in the Dutch province of Limburg. It is part of the municipality of Eijsden-Margraten, and situated about 8 km southeast of the town of Maastricht.

== Traditions ==
This village is one of the few that has been part of four municipalities at the same time and later one of two. (Until 1828 parts of it belonged to Gronsveld, to Breust, to Rijckholt and to Valkenburg. From 1828 until 1982 it was part of Sint Geertruid and of Gronsveld, whereas in the last mentioned year it completely became part of Margraten). But it is said that before 1828 a criminal could easily avoid apprehension by simply crossing the street, as there was little or no juridical co-ordination between the several municipalities the village then partly belonged to.

== Gallery ==
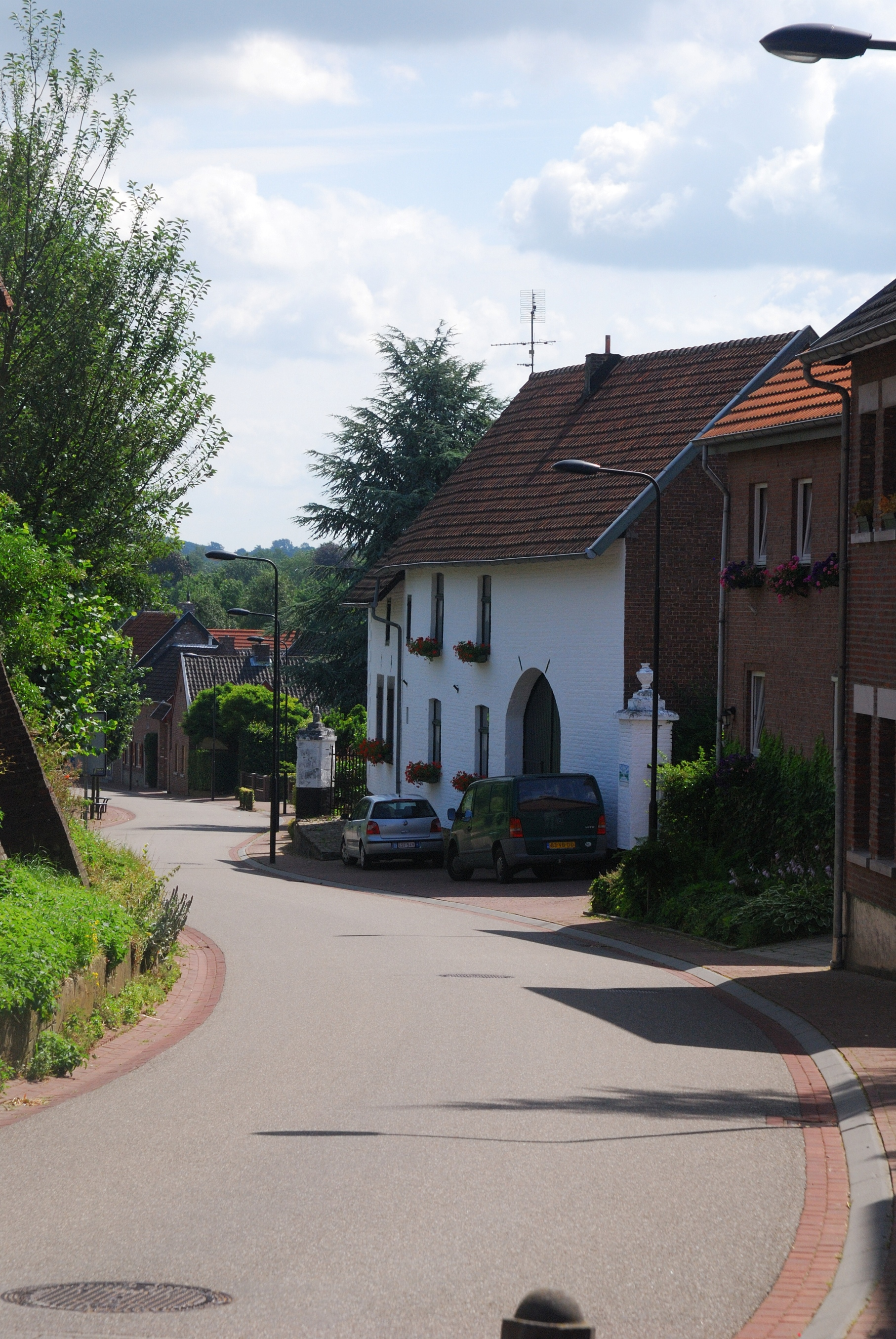
Eckelrade street in the hilly southern part of Limburg

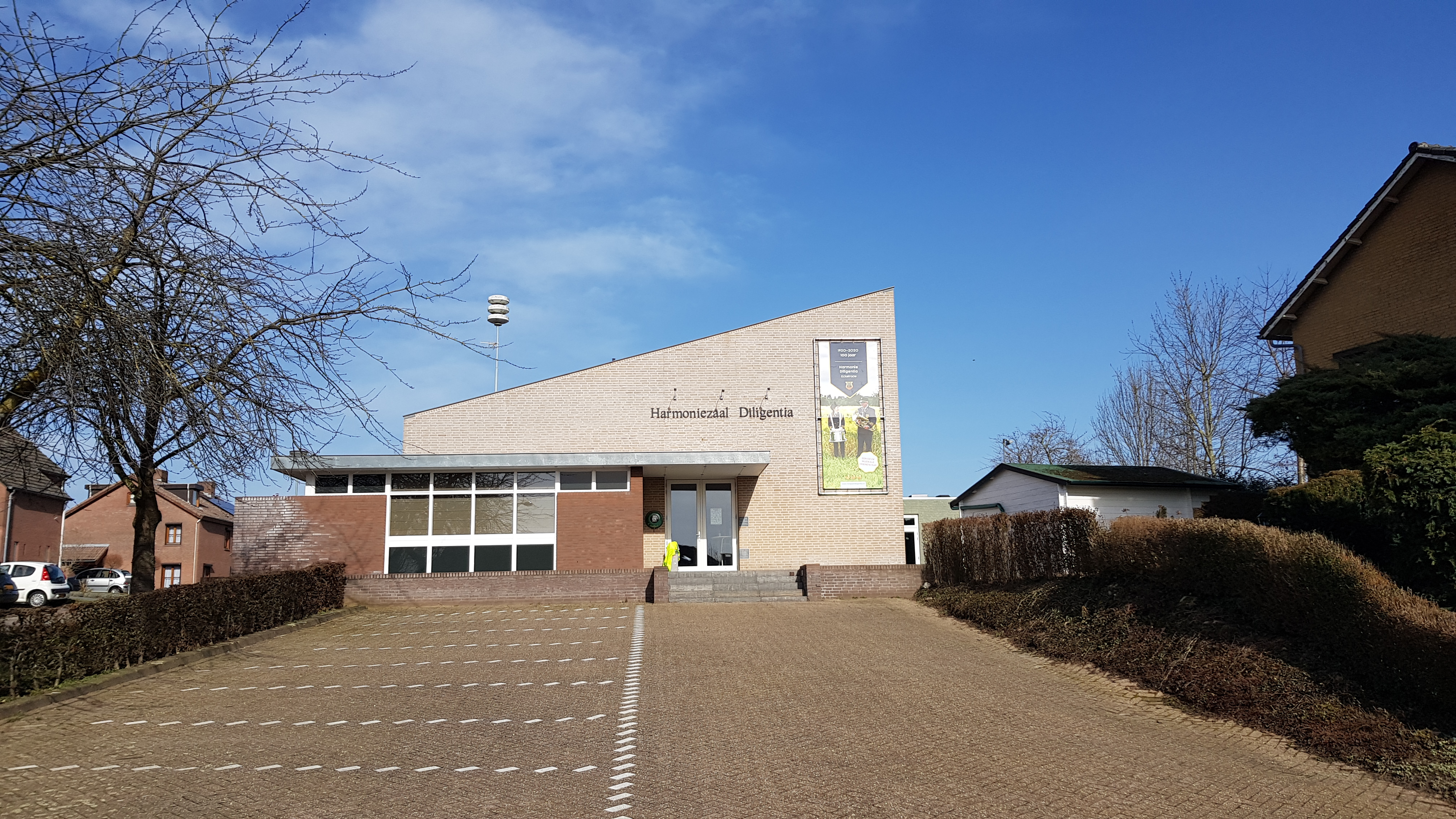
Concert band building

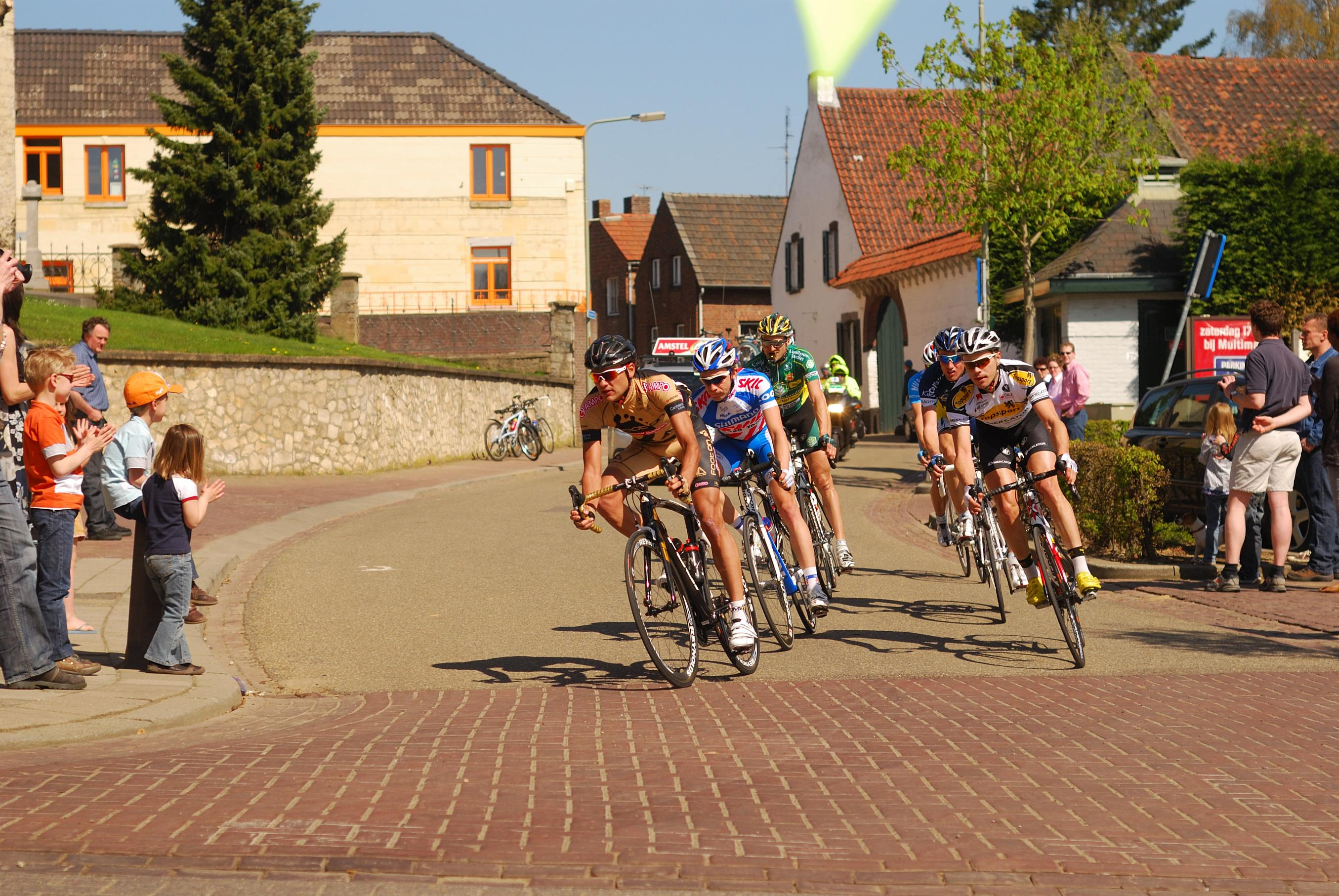
Amstel Gold Race

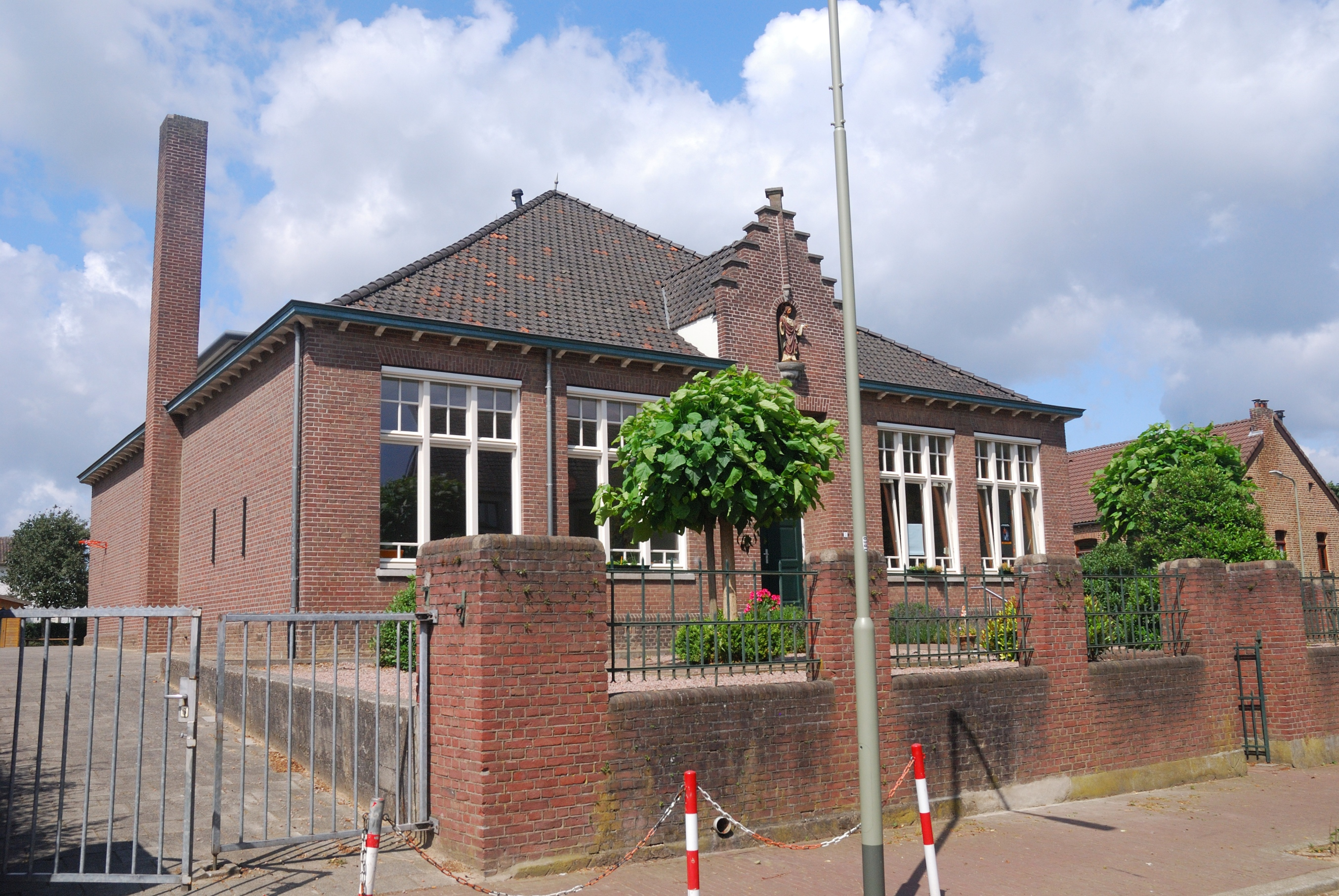
School
