= Papaverhof =

Coordinates: 52.0753°N 4.2608°E

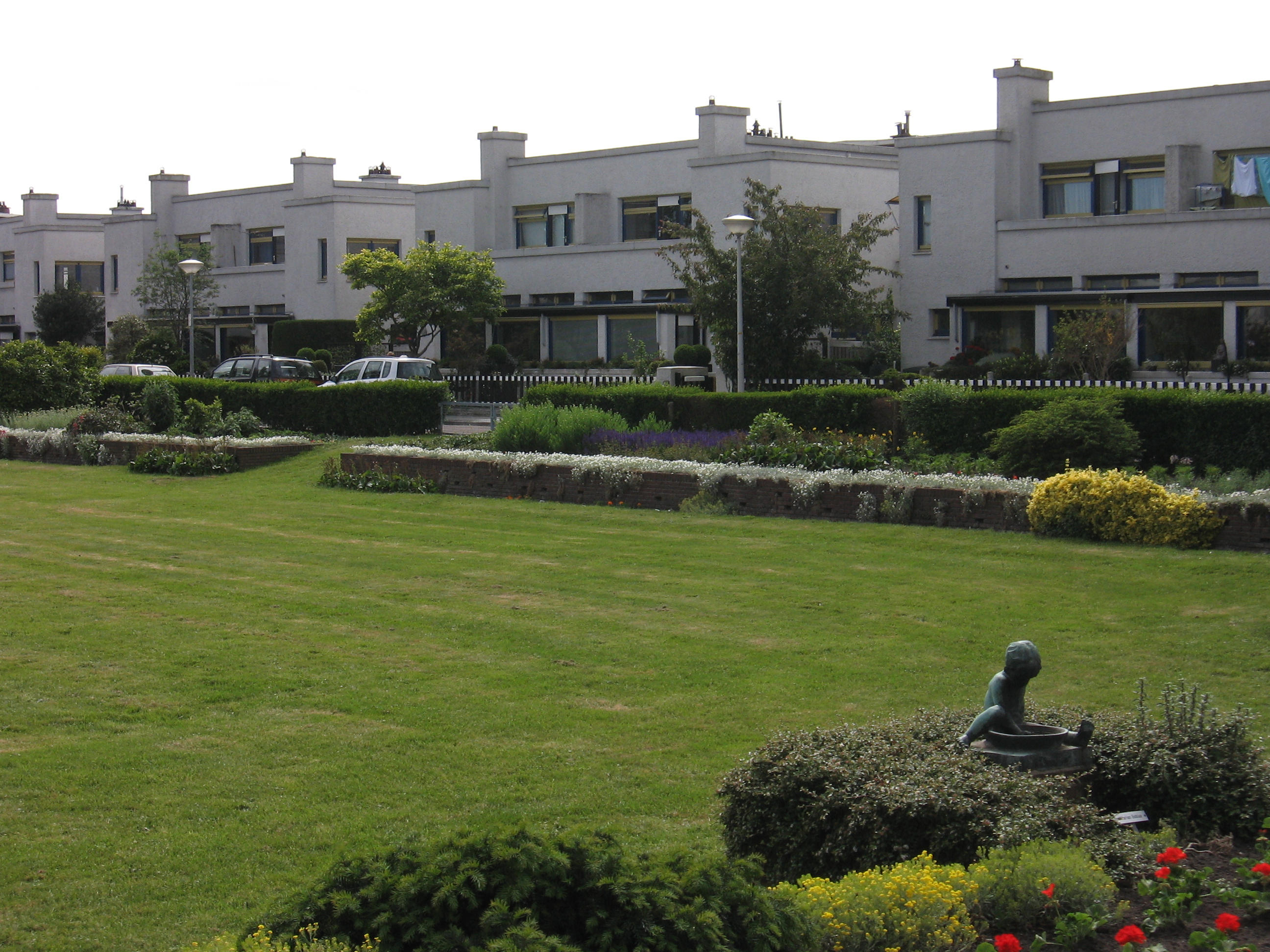
Overview of Papaverhof complex

The Papaverhof is a housing complex in The Hague that was designed by Jan Wils. Built between 1919 and 1921, the project was Wils' breakthrough as an architect. Today the Papaverhof is a Rijksmonument that is one of the Top 100 Dutch heritage sites. The complex was restored in 1958, 1971, 1989, and 2006.

The Papaverhof includes 128 middle-class homes built in horseshoe fashion around a sunken garden. Besides the communal garden in the middle, each home has its own yard with enclosing wooden fence and cement flower pots in matching architectural style.

== Architect ==
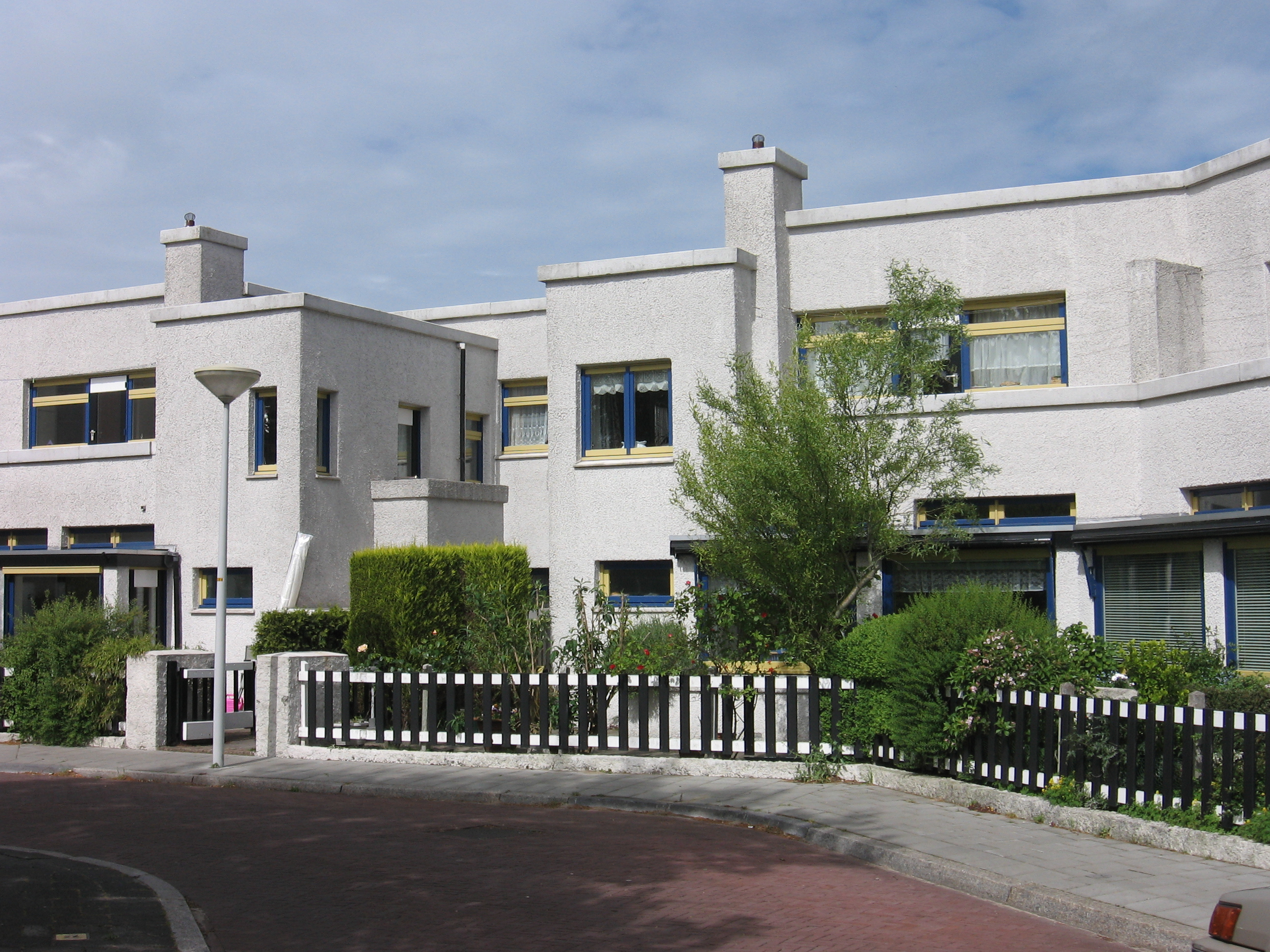
Cement homes in the complex

The architect of the Papaverhof, Jan Wils (Alkmaar, Netherlands 1891 - Voorburg, Netherlands 1972), was the son of a building contractor in Alkmaar. Wils worked extensively with his father and took evening courses for construction drawing. In The Hague, he worked for Hendrik Berlage, who encouraged Wils' social engagement and introduced him to Frank Lloyd Wright’s work. In 1916, Wils established his own architectural firm in The Hague, hiring hired Piet Zwart as a drafter in 1919.

== Construction ==
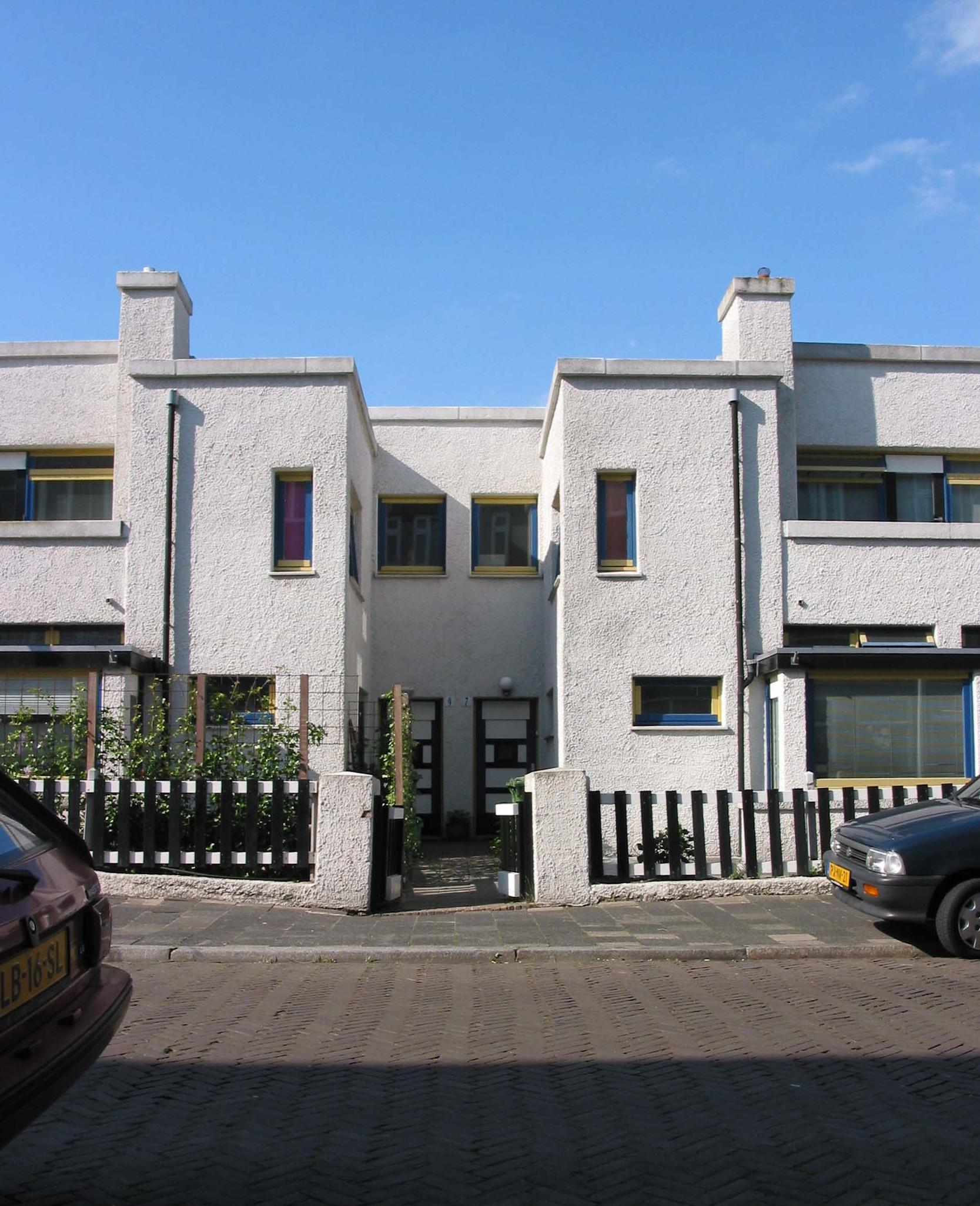
Two houses at the back of the complex

In 1917, the Cooperative Residential Construction Association Garden City Neighborhood ‘Daal en Berg’ decided to build the Papaverhof, a complex of houses and apartments between The Hague and Loosduinen.

The association originally planned to sponsor a competition for the project design, but the association commissioner, Hendrik Berlage, objected to it. The association originally chose M.J. Granpré Molière and P. Verhagen to be the architects. However, their design was missing a municipal extension plan. At Berlage's suggestion, the association finally selected Wils' design for Papaverhof. The cooperative had great respect for Wils, allowing him to design atypical housing for that period.

Wils configured the Papaverhof housing units as two horseshoes around a lawn square, creating the spatial effect of a garden city. The inner ring contained 68 two story high family houses. The outer contained 60 apartments. Wils placed the units in a ‘back to back’ configuration that multiplied the facades with light and air supply for the kitchen and bedrooms without lowering the density of the neighborhood.

In the Papaverhof interior design, Wils created a rhythmic composition of cubes and planes without a specific front nor back. The interior breaks as well with the classical patterns of an underused best room and tiny back room by designing one big living room of 7 x 4,25 meter. Because of the 60 centimeters interior floor difference between the side entrance and the living area, also the exterior detachment of the main mass jumps out. With the repetition of the module it creates a rhythmical collective façade with two singular ends.

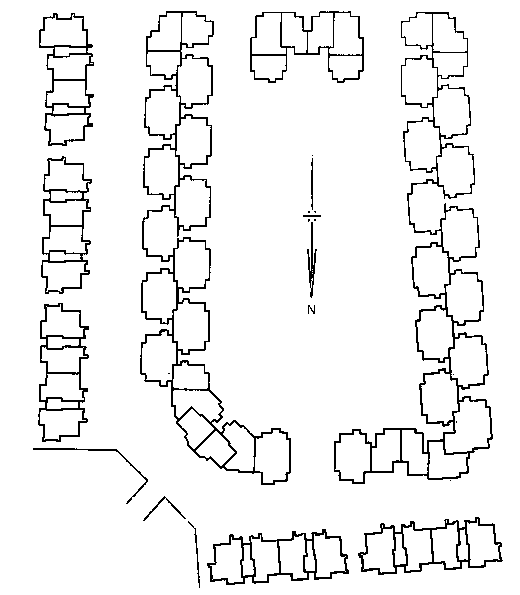
Map of the complex

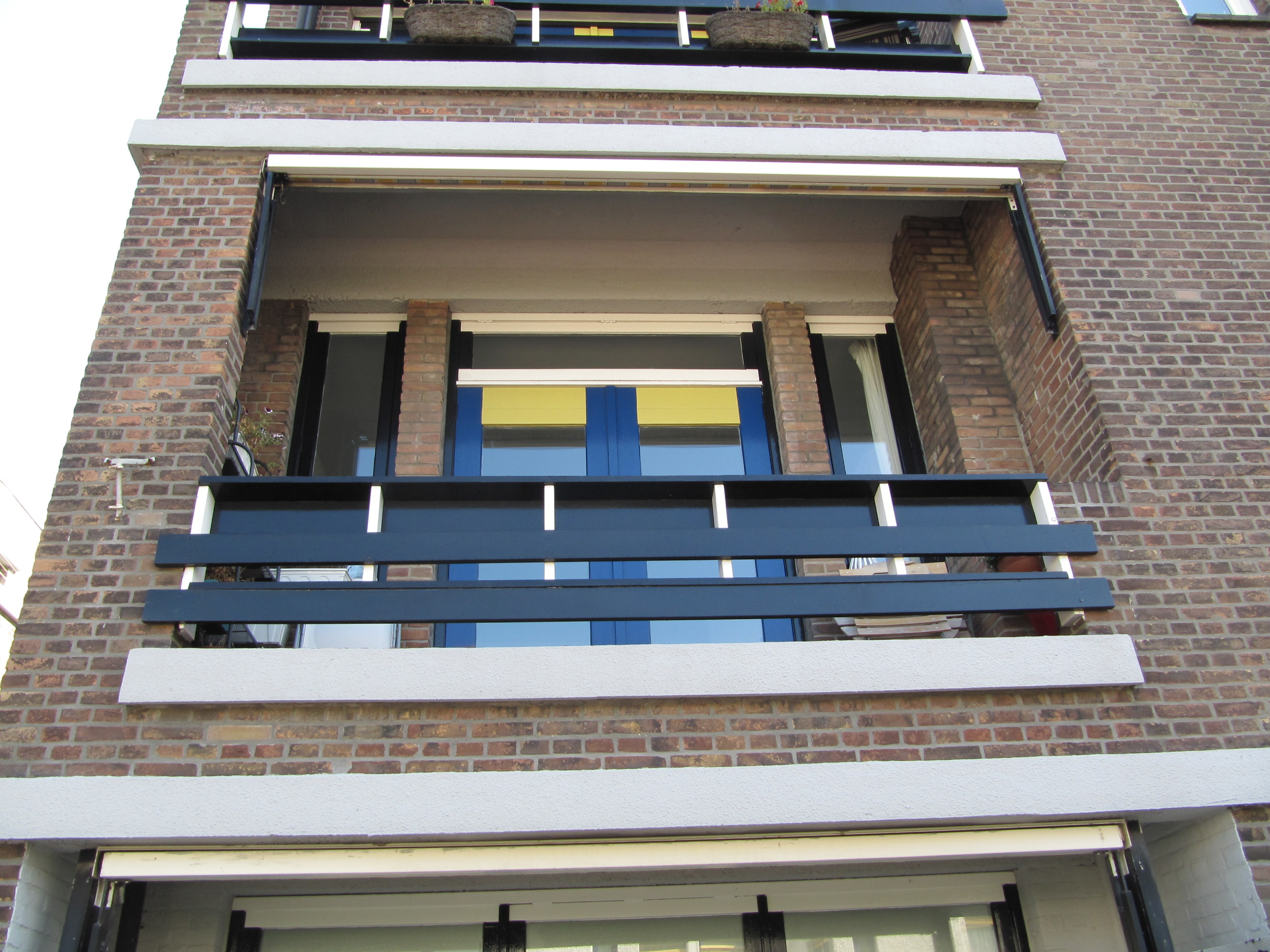
Balcony on one of the houses at the opposite of the Papaverhof, also built by Jan Wils

The builders used cinders concrete for the first 30 Papaverhof homes. However, the poor quality of this material and its minimal cost benefit moved them to change to brick for the remaining houses. The builders then covered the brick family houses with cement to make them look like the cinder concrete houses.

The technical innovations of the Papaverhof design are demonstrated by the pivoting windows, intercom for the main door, automatically dimming lights and waste disposal chutes. Such innovations illustrate Wils' forwarding thinking.

== Reception ==
In 1920, while the Papaverhof was still under constructions, its design was exhibited in the Royal School of Art, Technology and Craft in 's-Hertogenbosch. And although almost financially ruining Jan Wils’ design office, the Papaverhof quickly was internationally known. The German journal Wasmuths Monatshefte für Baukunst wrote in 1921 that the Papaverhof grouped houses were very detailed and innovative. “The houses don’t have facades anymore, but each building part is expressed in detail and brought into relation with the surroundings through proportion and dimensions in contrast and harmonious in the same time.”

The Papaverhof design may contain references to other contemporaneous architects. Oud's design for a strand boulevard in Scheveningen (1917) has many similarities. It is remarkable that the explanations they have for their design are both related to ‘planes and masses with rhythmic ordering’. Frank Lloyd Wright's Lexington Terraces (1894) project in Chicago, Illinois are often linked with the Papaverhop design, as this housing complex with light wells is also configured around a rectangular courtyard. But the closed façade makes the spatial feeling rather massive than planar of fragmented.

The Papaverhof can be an example for color use and architecture of De Stijl, but its brick surroundings could fit better in the descriptions of The Hague School. The New Hague School is a style from the interwar period, that distinguishes itself through the sleek design of the Modern Movement and luxurious implementation.

== Restorations ==
In 1971, the Daal en Berg association completed an extensive renovation of the Papaverhof. However, by 1986, the complex was suffering extensive problems with water infiltration and needed another renovation.

The association commissioned the restoration firm Franso and Partners Architects to study the Papaverhof's building history. The 1958/1960 renovation eaves that many critics pointed out as being an example of Frank Lloyd Wright style, actually deviated from the original plan and were removed. External isolation was applied with respect for the proportions.

The association restored the original vivid blue and yellow colors to the inner circle, but kept the non-original white and black colors of the outer ring for esthetic reasons. The contractors Boele & van Eesteren realized the plans and in October 1989 the definitive acceptance took place. This renovation was largely covered in the journal press in the Netherlands, and received a nomination for the National Renovation Price and the National Painting Price in 1991.
