= Landgoed Schaffelaar =

Historic Estate located in Netherlands

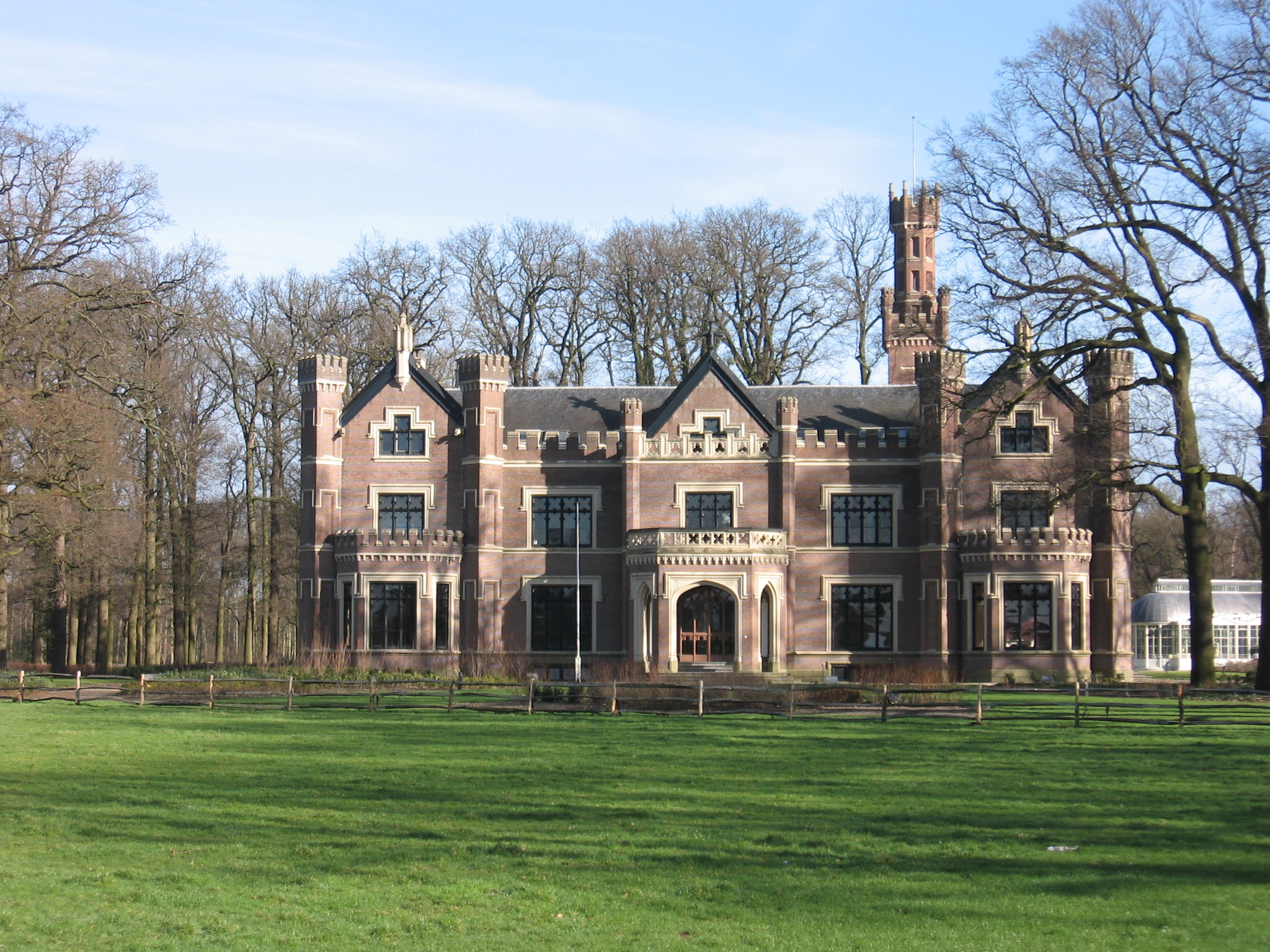
The Castle of Schaffelaar

Landgoed Schaffelaar is a historic estate located in Barneveld, in the province of Gelderland, the Netherlands. The estate covers approximately 94 hectares and features a 19th-century Tudor Revival manor house - commonly referred to as Kasteel De Schaffelaar - woodlands, meadows, water features, and an orangery.

== Cultural significance ==
Landgoed Schaffelaar belongs to the Top 100 Dutch heritage sites list of heritage sites. The estate is considered one of the most prominent examples of Tudor architecture in the Netherlands and is also valued for its landscape design, and heritage from medieval origins to the 19th century.

== History ==
In 1767, the original Schaffelaar was built by L.W. Baron van Essen on the site and was surrounded by a moat. In 1799 the house burned down. In 1852, a new house was commissioned by J.H. Baron van Zuylen van Nievelt. The new house was designed by A. van Veggel in the Neo-Gothic style; it was built South-West of the old house. In 1853, the gardens were redesigned by J.D. Zocher Jr, and L.P. Zocher.

== Description of the grounds ==
The moat remains with a small island. The grounds are divided by the driveway which is an original avenue from the 18th Century. The driveway runs towards the center of the original house. To the east of the grounds lies the original star-shaped woods which is shown on a map from 1803. To the west is another wooded area.
