= Kruitmolen =

Watermill in Valkenburg, Netherlands

- Powder mill Polfermeule
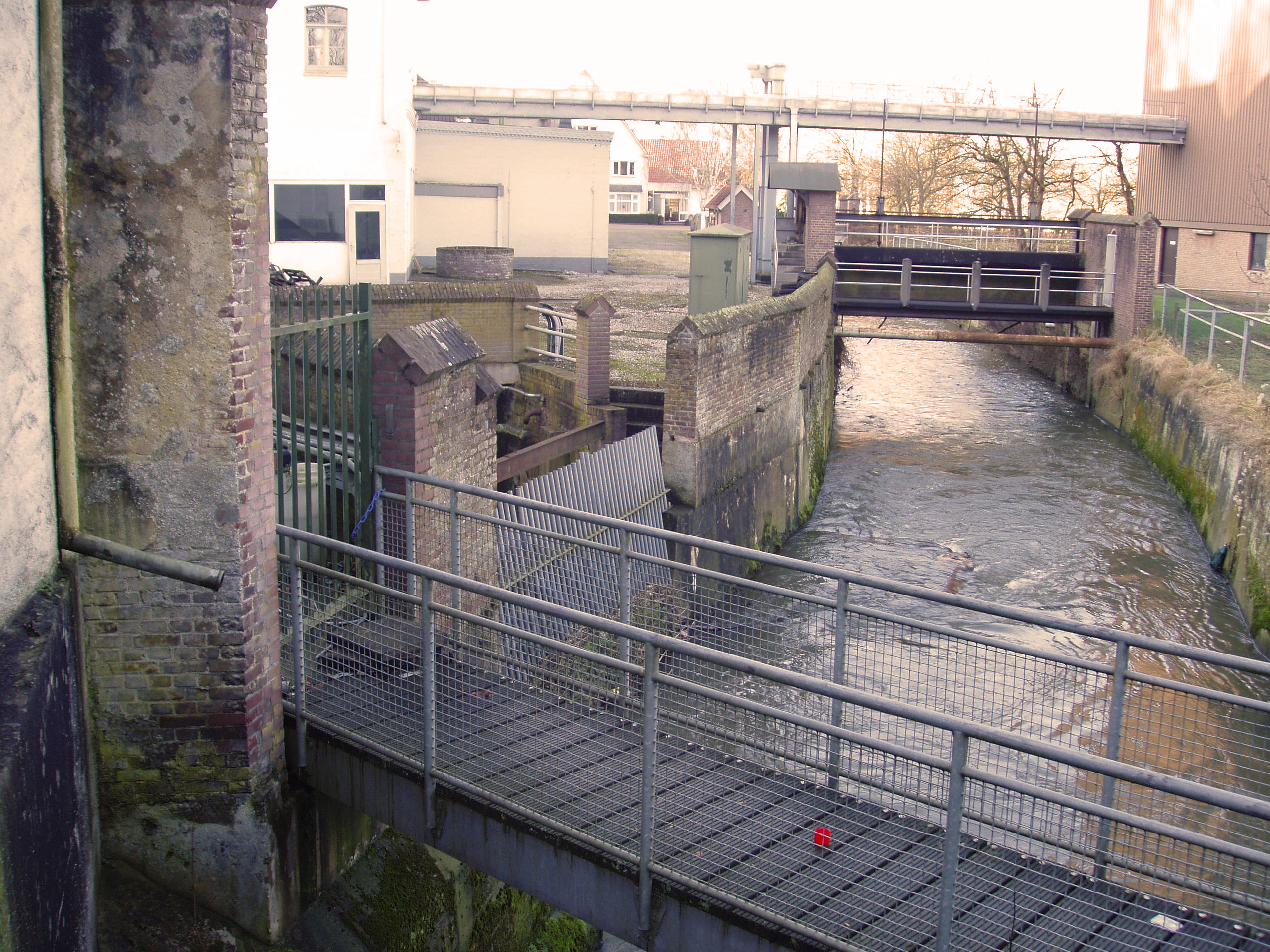
- Waterway on the left flows towards the Kruitmolen
- Interactive map of Kruitmolen

General information
- Status: Rijksmonument (36784)
- Type: Watermill
- Location: Plenkertstraat 82, Valkenburg aan de Geul, Netherlands
- Coordinates: 50.8659°N 5.8226°E
- Completed: 1820
- Designations: Brewery (1887-present); Paper mill (1875-1884); Powder mill (1820-1851)

References
- Database of Dutch Mills

The Kruitmolen (English: Powder mill, Limburgish: Polfermeule) is a watermill located on the Plenkertstraat 82 in Valkenburg aan de Geul, Netherlands. Build in 1820 along the Geul river, the watermill functioned as powder mill until 1851 and temporarily became a paper mill between 1875 and 1884. Since 1887 it is part of a brewery where it currently still forms a part of the electrical supply system.

The mill is a rijksmonument since January 24, 1984 and is part of the Top 100 Dutch heritage sites.
