= Jan Wils =

Dutch architect (1891–1972)

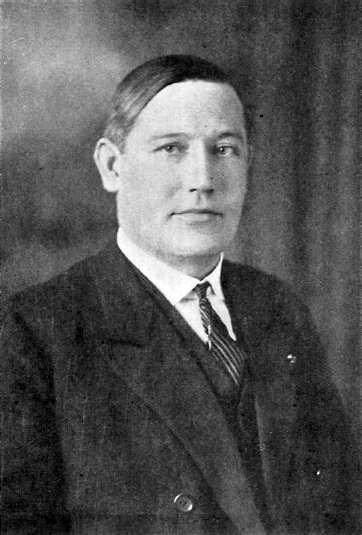
- Wils c1928

Personal information
- Born: 22 February 1891 Alkmaar, Netherlands
- Died: 11 February 1972 (aged 80) Voorburg, Netherlands
Medal record
Art competitions
Representing Netherlands
Olympic Games
Gold medal – first place	1928 Amsterdam	Architectural design

Jan Wils (Alkmaar, 22 February 1891 – Voorburg, 11 February 1972) was a Dutch architect known for his design of the Olympic Stadium for the 1928 Summer Olympics in Amsterdam.

Wils joined Johan Mutters's office in The Hague in 1914 but left two years later to start his own firm.

Wils was one of the founding members of the De Stijl movement, which also included artists as Piet Mondrian, Theo van Doesburg and Gerrit Rietveld. His work evolved into the style of the New Hague School.

Among other works, Wils designed the Olympic Stadium for the 1928 Summer Olympics in Amsterdam. His design was also entered in the Olympic art competition, and won the gold medal. He also designed the Papaverhof housing complex, now a Rijksmonument (Dutch national heritage site).
