= Nicolaïkerk (Appingedam) =

Church in Appingedam, Netherlands

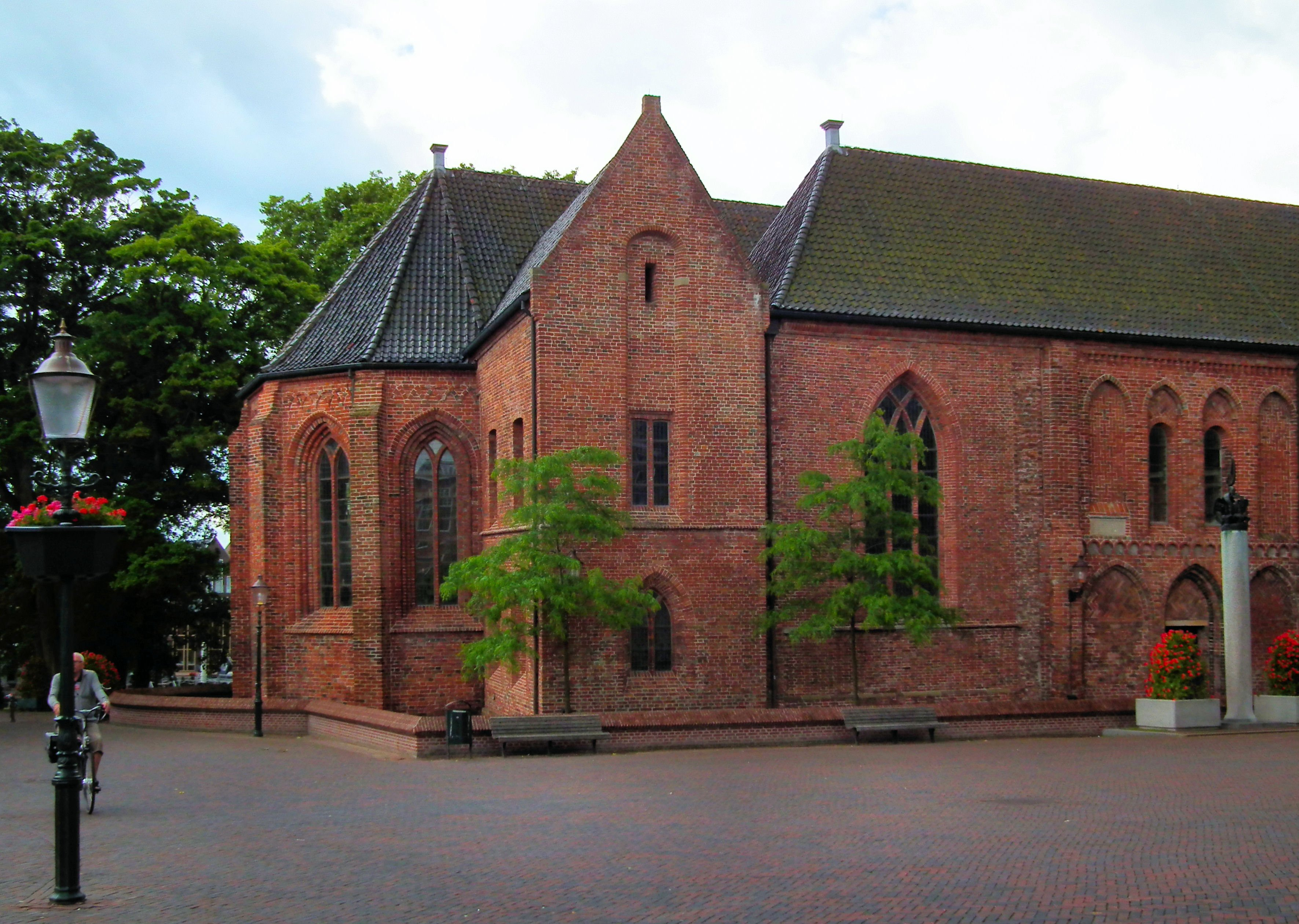
- The Nicolaïkerk in 2012

- Location in Groningen in the Netherlands

Religion
- Affiliation: Protestant Church

Location
- Location: Appingedam, Netherlands
- Interactive map of Nicolaïkerk
- Coordinates: 53°19′11″N 6°51′26″E

Website
- www.nicolaikerk-appingedam.nl

The Nicolaïkerk (Dutch pronunciation: [ˈnikoːlɑiˌkɛr(ə)k]; English: Nicholas Church) is a Romano-Gothic hall church in Appingedam in the Netherlands. The church is used by the Protestant Church in the Netherlands. The building is a rijksmonument (national heritage site) since 1968 and one of the Top 100 Dutch heritage sites that was selected in 1990.

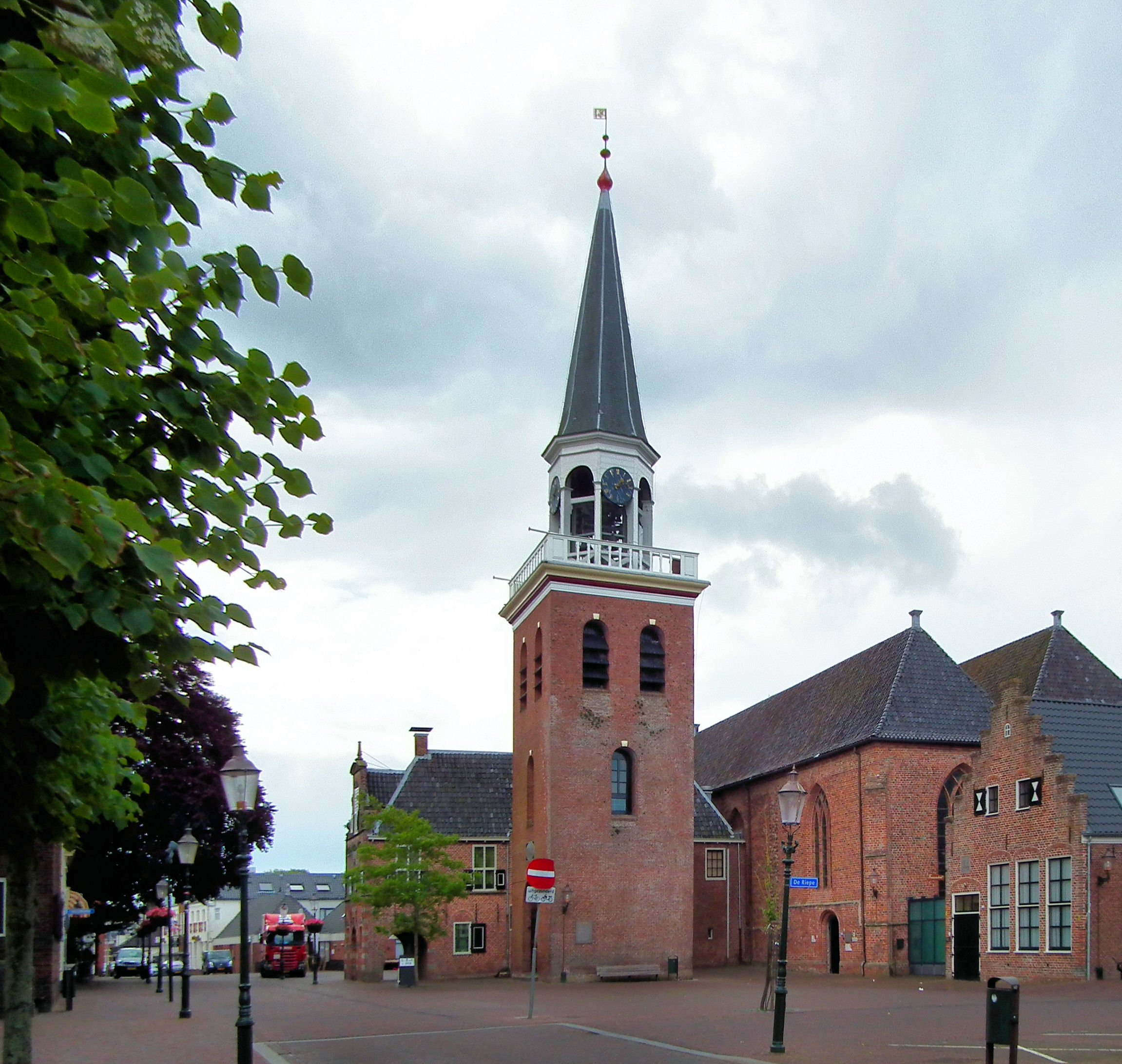
The stand-alone bell tower of the church in 2012

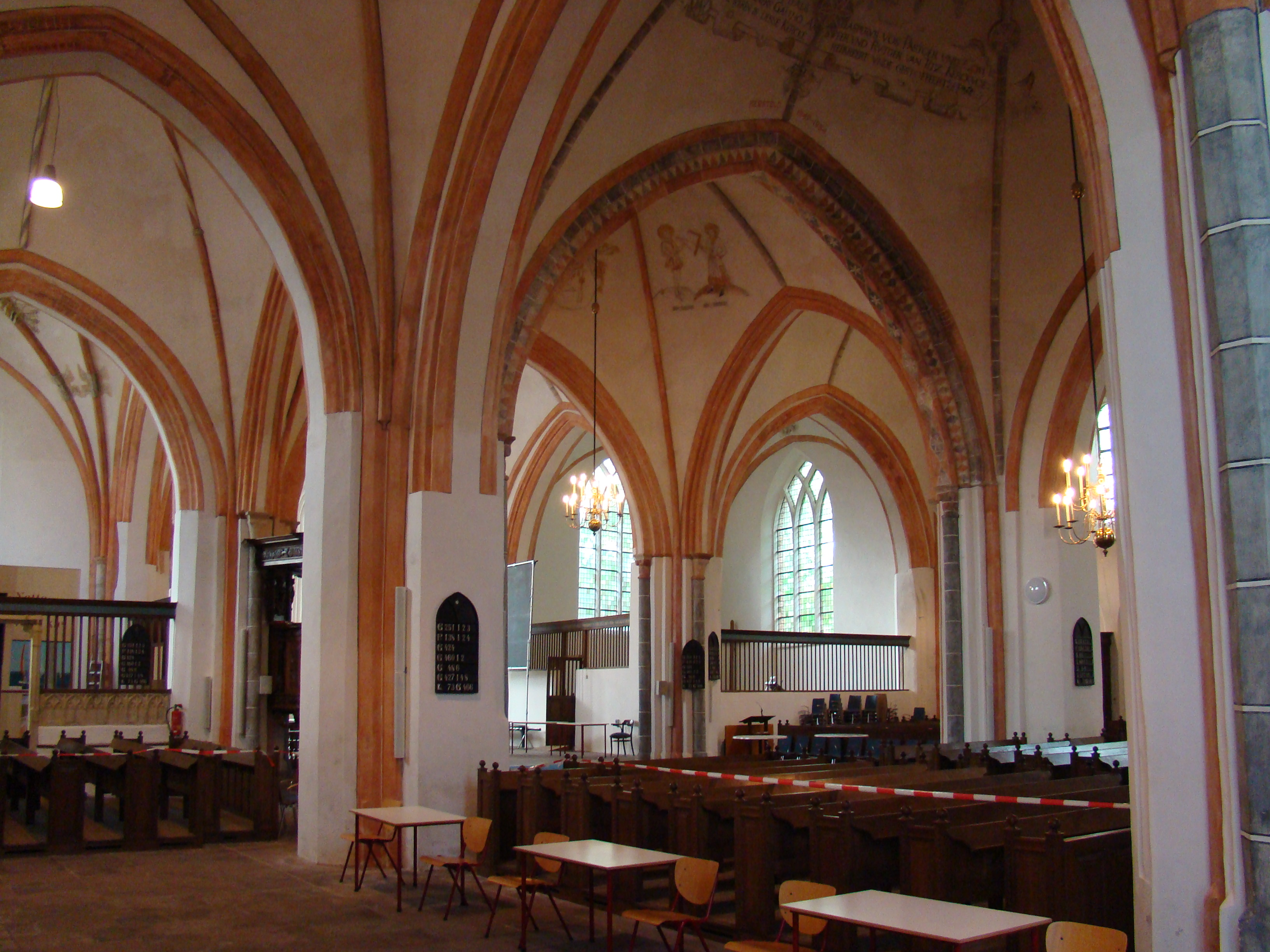
Interior of the church in 2010

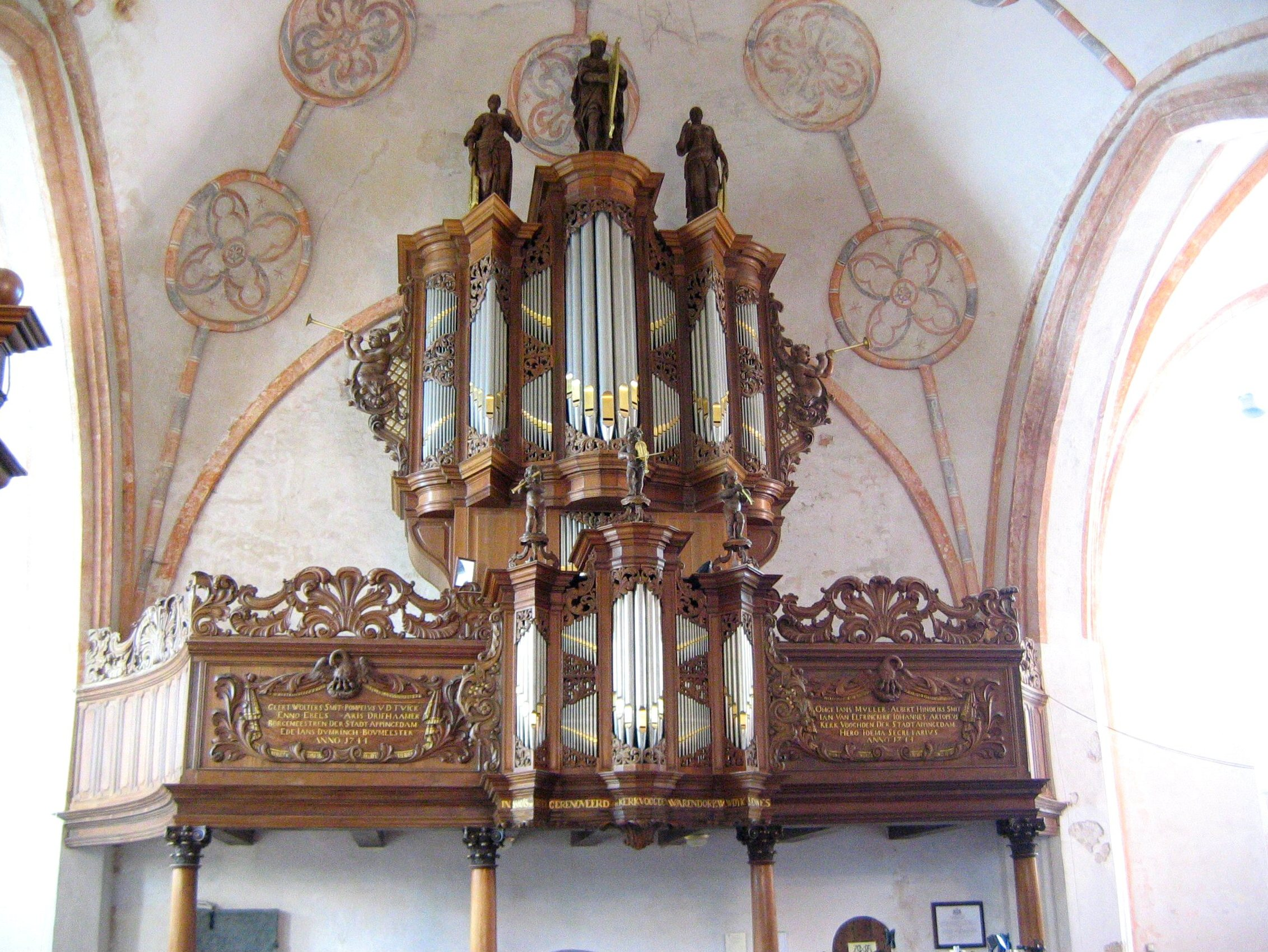
Organ in 2005
