= Eijsden Castle =

Castle in the Netherlands

Coordinates: 50.7736°N 5.6997°E

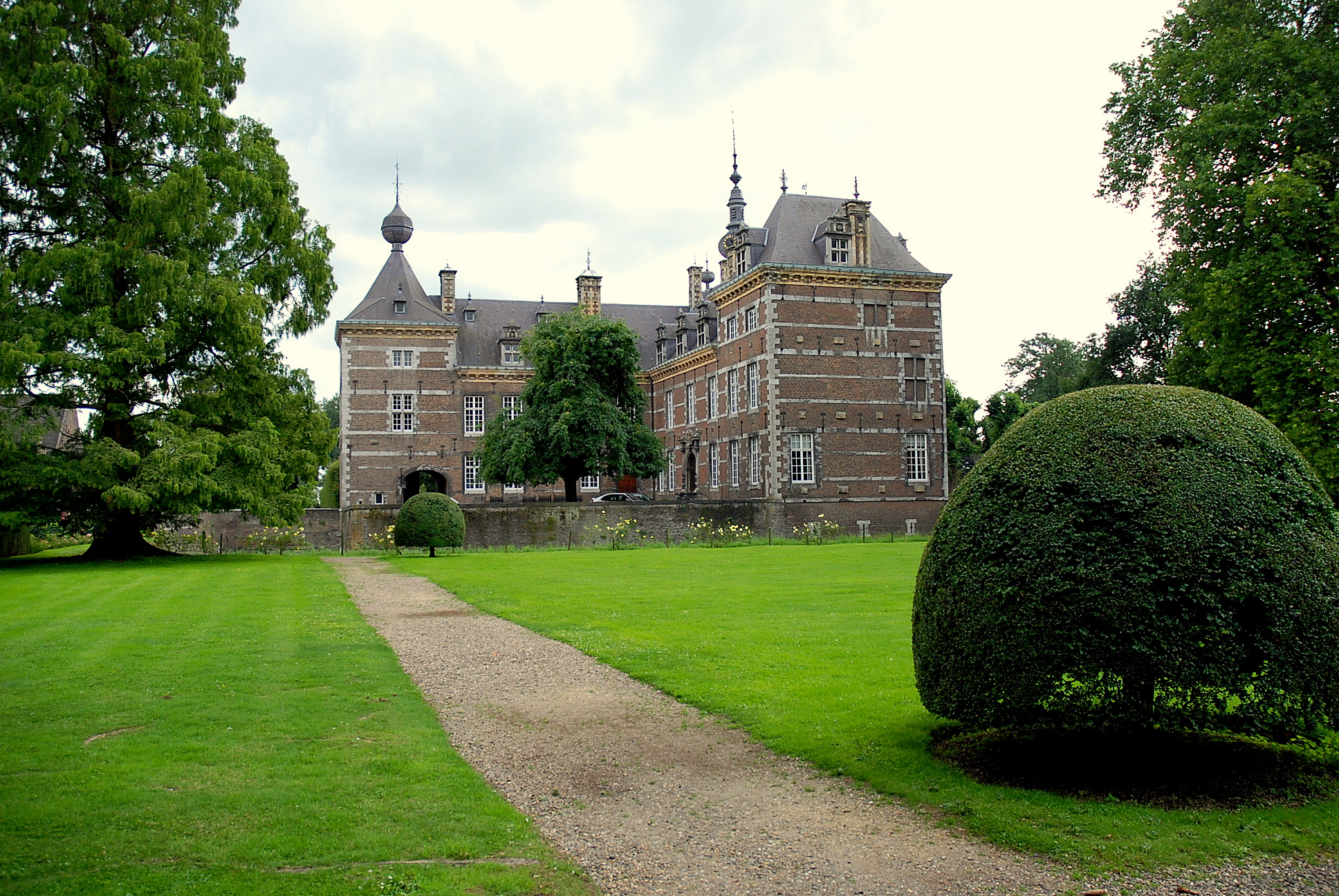
Eijsden Castle in Eijsden

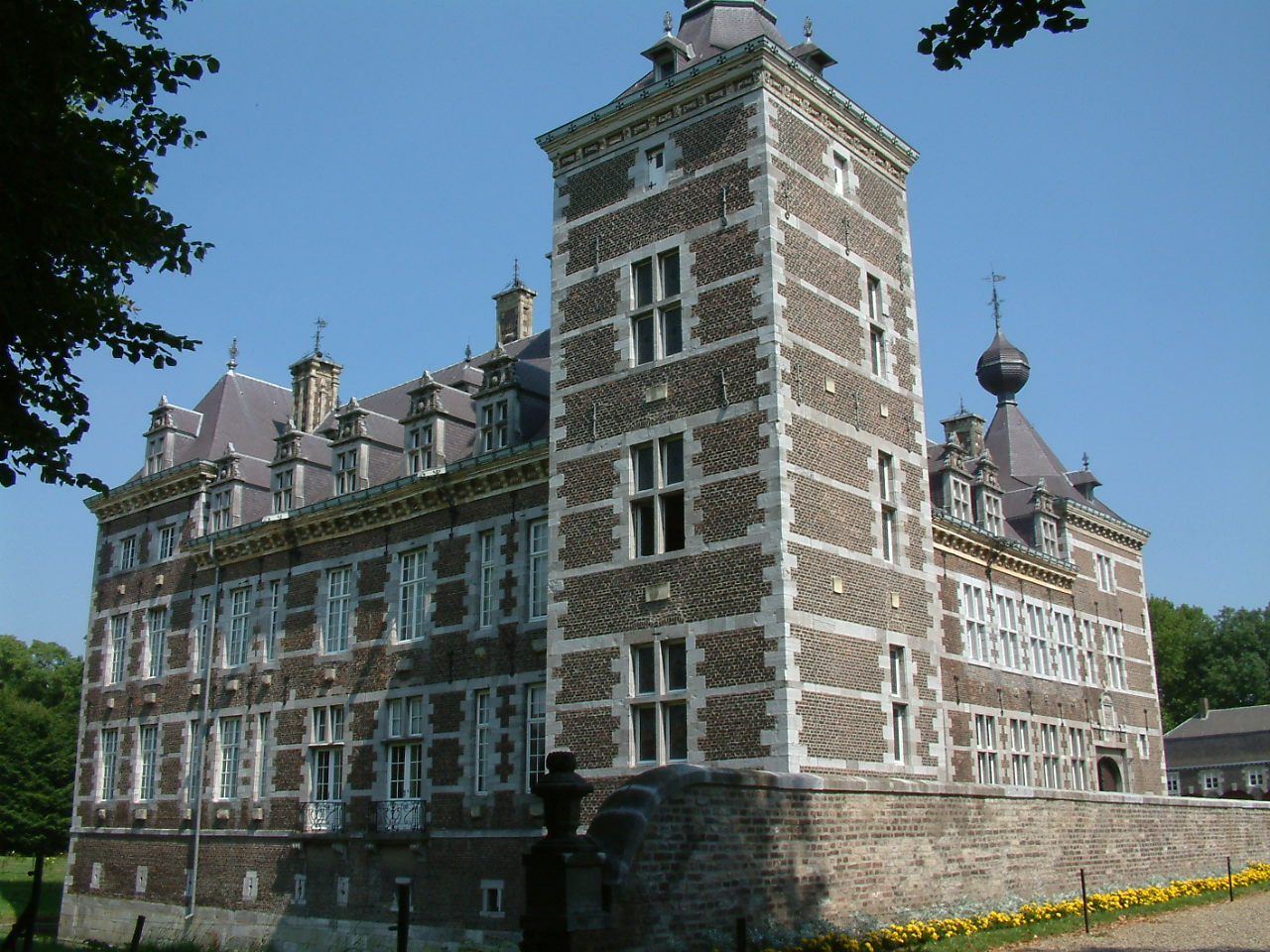
Eijsden Castle, west side

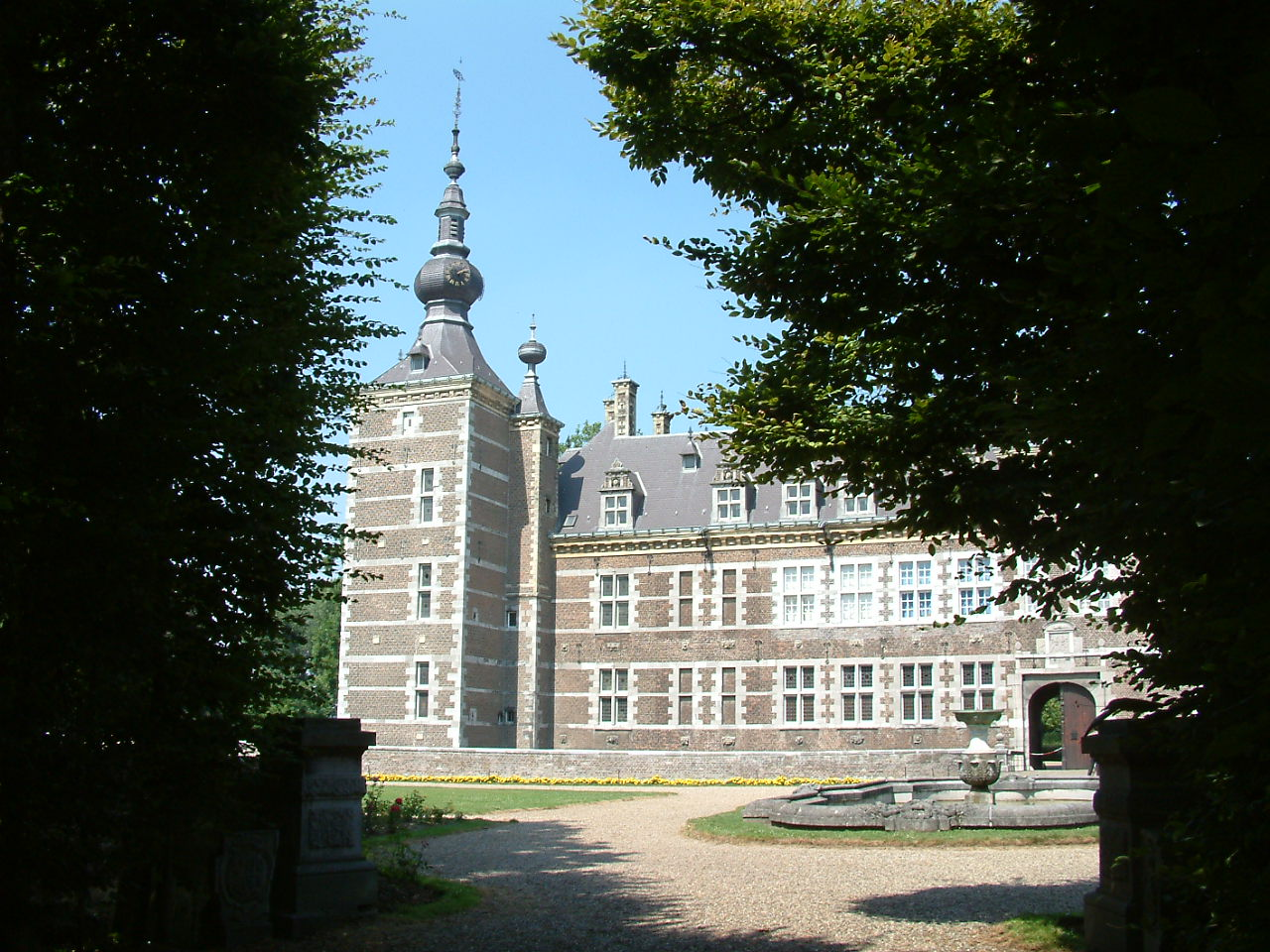
Eijsden Castle, south side

Eijsden Castle (Dutch: Kasteel Eijsden) is a moated manor house with several farm buildings, a gatehouse and castle park, in Eijsden-Margraten, Limburg, Netherlands. The current castle was built in 1637 and is located next to the river Maas.

The castle is a rijksmonument. Also other parts of the terrain are separately listed, making a total of 27 rijksmonuments. It is part of the Top 100 Dutch heritage sites, established in 1990 by the Department for Conservation.

== Description ==
The current castle was built in 1636, renovated in 1767, and restored between 1881 and 1886. The castle is made up out of two angled wings with at the outside corner a heavy cornertower flanked by a small stair tower. At the end of the eastwing Athere is another towerlike building containing a gate which grands access to the inner square. On top of this gate is placed the year of completion and the arms of the De Lamargelle and von Bocholtz families. The whole is surrounded by a moat. The castle is built in Mosan style.

Next to the castle is a gatebuilding with sidebuilding, built in 1649 when a fire destroyed the earlier buildings. They were restored between 1883 and 1885.

The castle park, created around 1900, is freely accessible. It was designed by French garden artist Achille Duchêne (1866–1947), replacing an earlier 18th century park. Of this original 18th century park only a small part remains on the northside of the castle, where there is also an 18th-century basement for the storage of ice. The current park has a neo-rococo pond and a group of statues containing three putti.

== History and inhabitants ==
The castle is located on or near the location of a medieval castle, named Caestertburg or Kettelhof. During the early Middle Ages the court and fertile riverlands were owned by the prince-bishops of Liège.

First mention of the castle was in 1334 when "den hof tot Esde" was granted to Dyederic van Montjoy en Valkenburg by John III, Duke of Brabant. In 1558 Eijsden was owned by Arnold II Huyn van Amstenrade, lord of Geleen, drossaerd of Valkenburg, governor of Brabant owned Maastricht and captain-general of Limburg and the lands east of the Maas. His daughter Anna married Willem de Lamarzelle, and their son, Arnold de Lamarzelle, build the current castle in 1636–1637. By inheritance the castle was owned successively by the families van Hoensbroeck, de Geloes and de Liedekerke, who are the current owners of the castle.

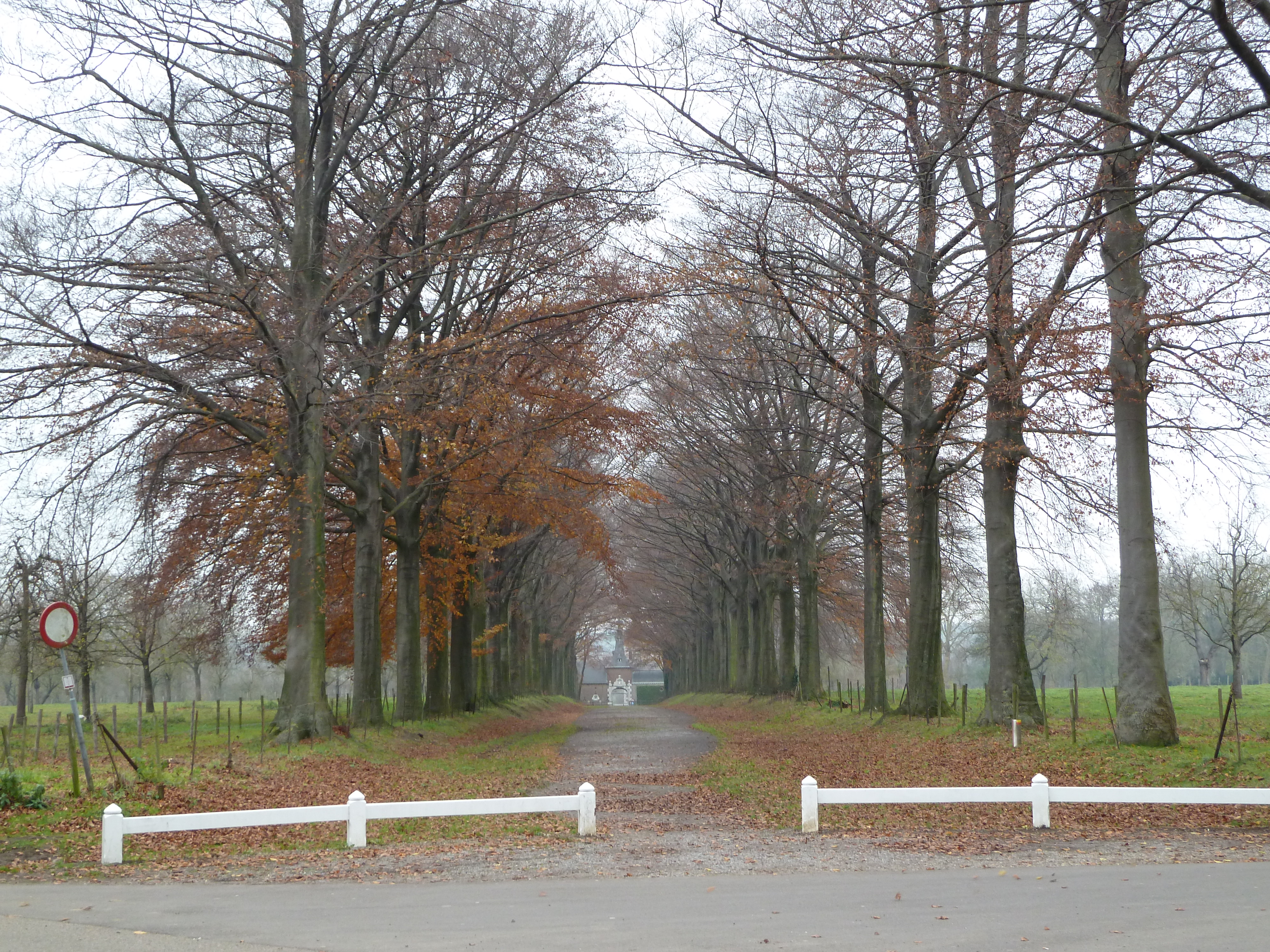
Castle entry lane seen from "De Wiette Päölkes"

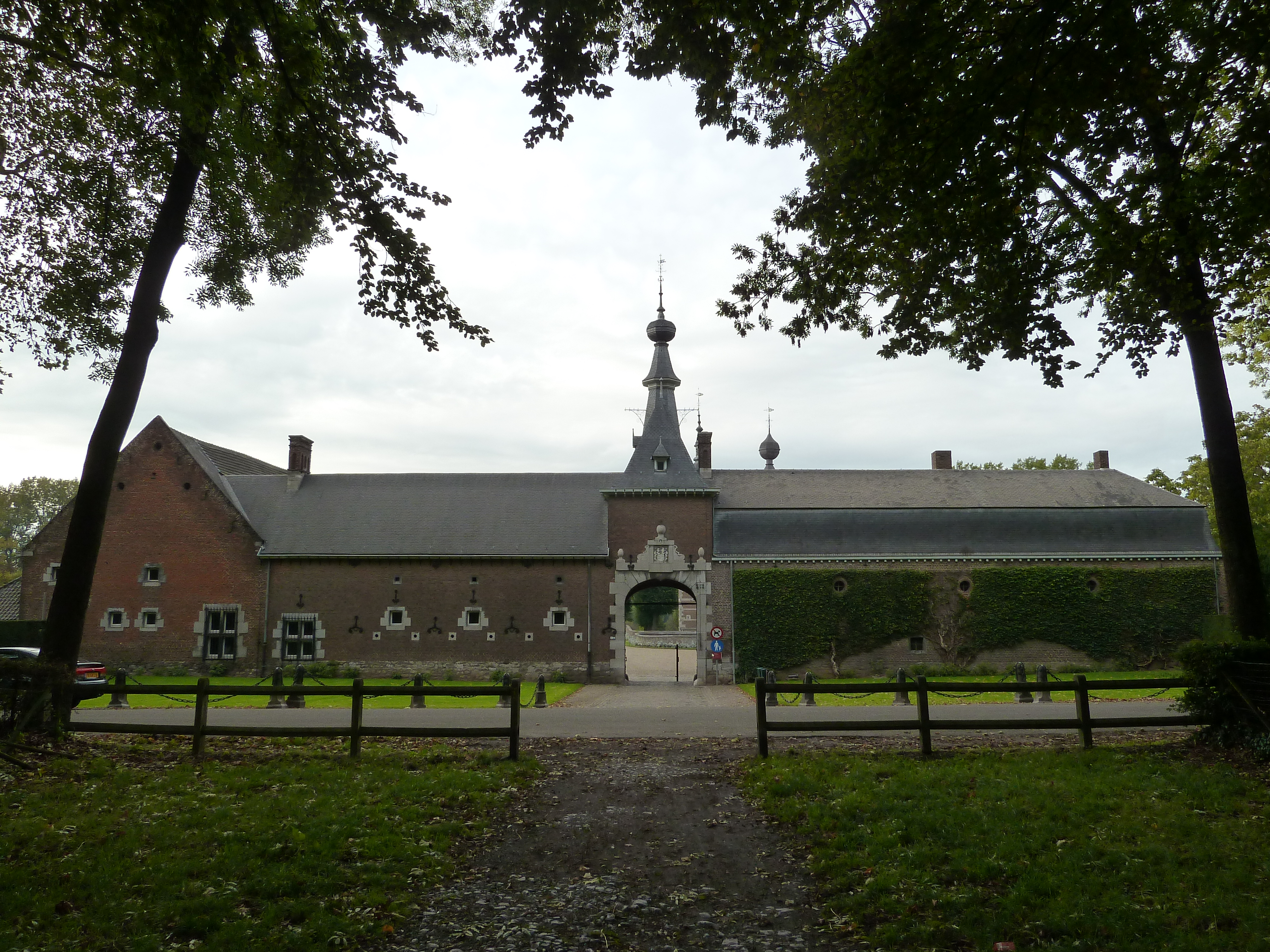
Gatehouse view from outside

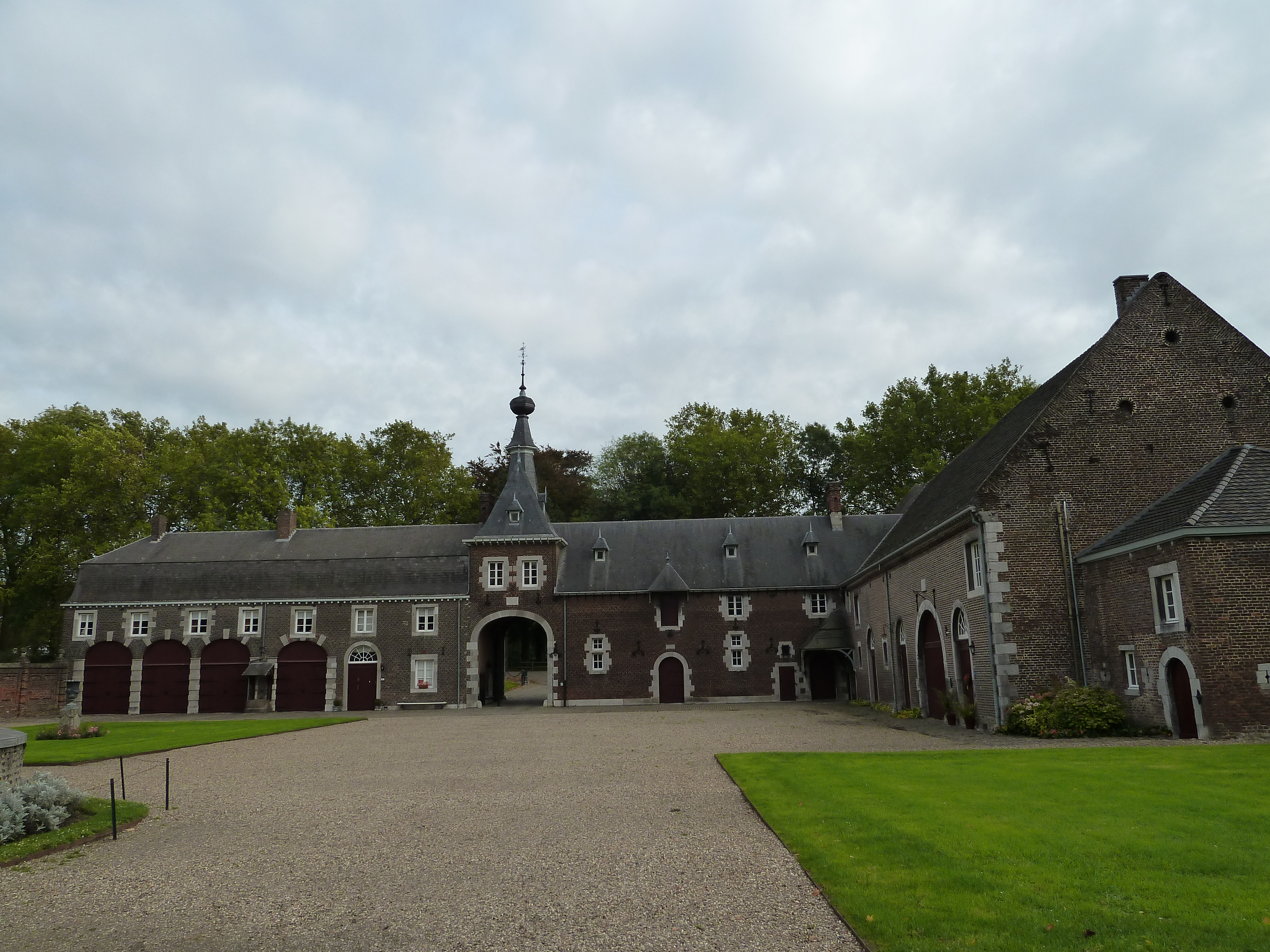
Gatehouse view from inside

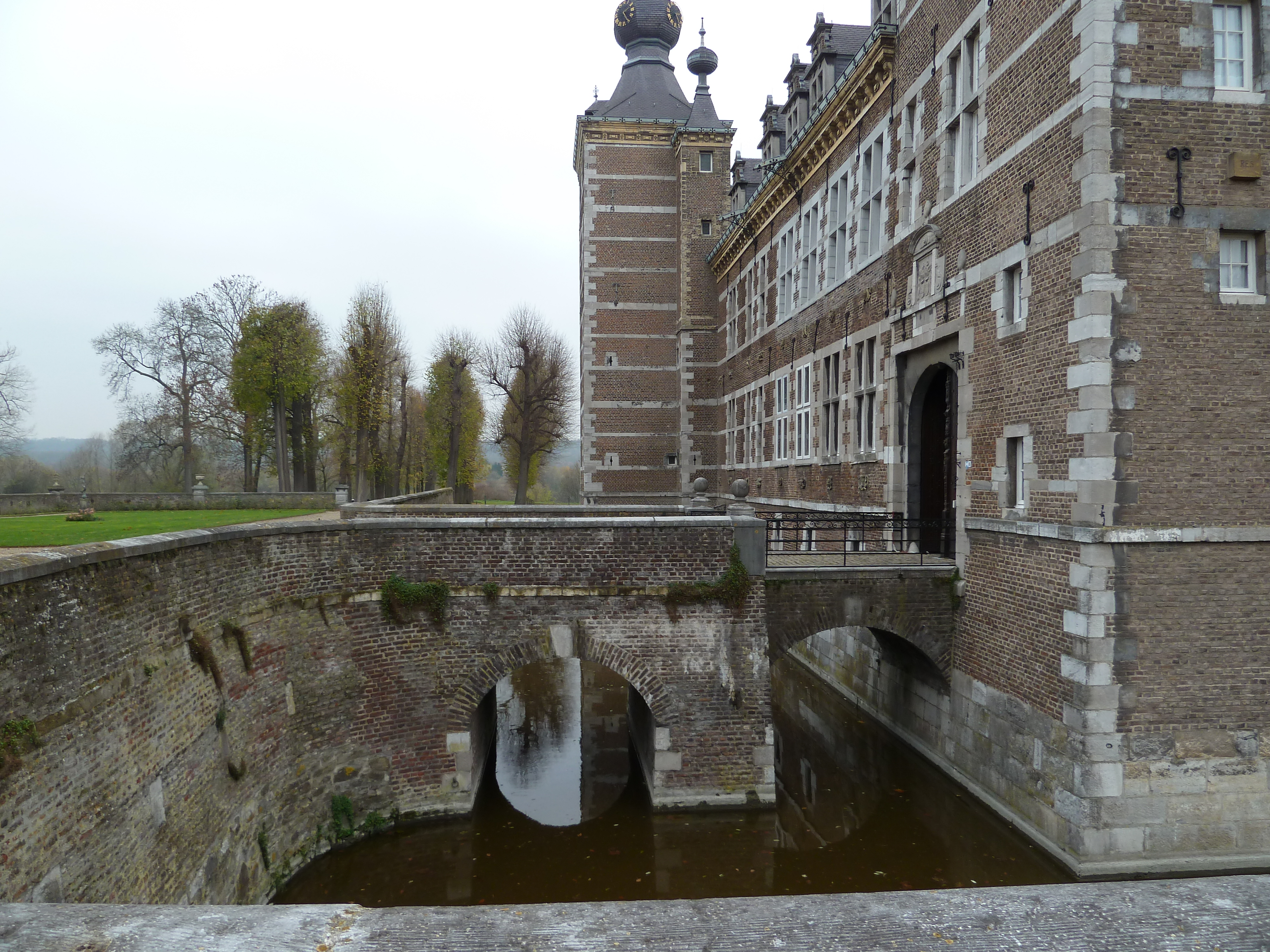
Moat and bridge
