= Sassenpoort =

Gatehouse in Zwolle, Netherlands

Coordinates: 52°30′35″N 6°05′43″E

Sassenpoort Saxon Gate
- Sassenpoort
- Interactive map of the Sassenpoort; Saxon Gate area

General information
- Type: Gatehouse
- Location: Zwolle, Netherlands, Sassenstraat 51; 8011 PB, Zwolle; Netherlands
- Construction started: 1409
- Owner: Government owned

Height
- Height: 50. Meters

References
- Dutch national monument registry

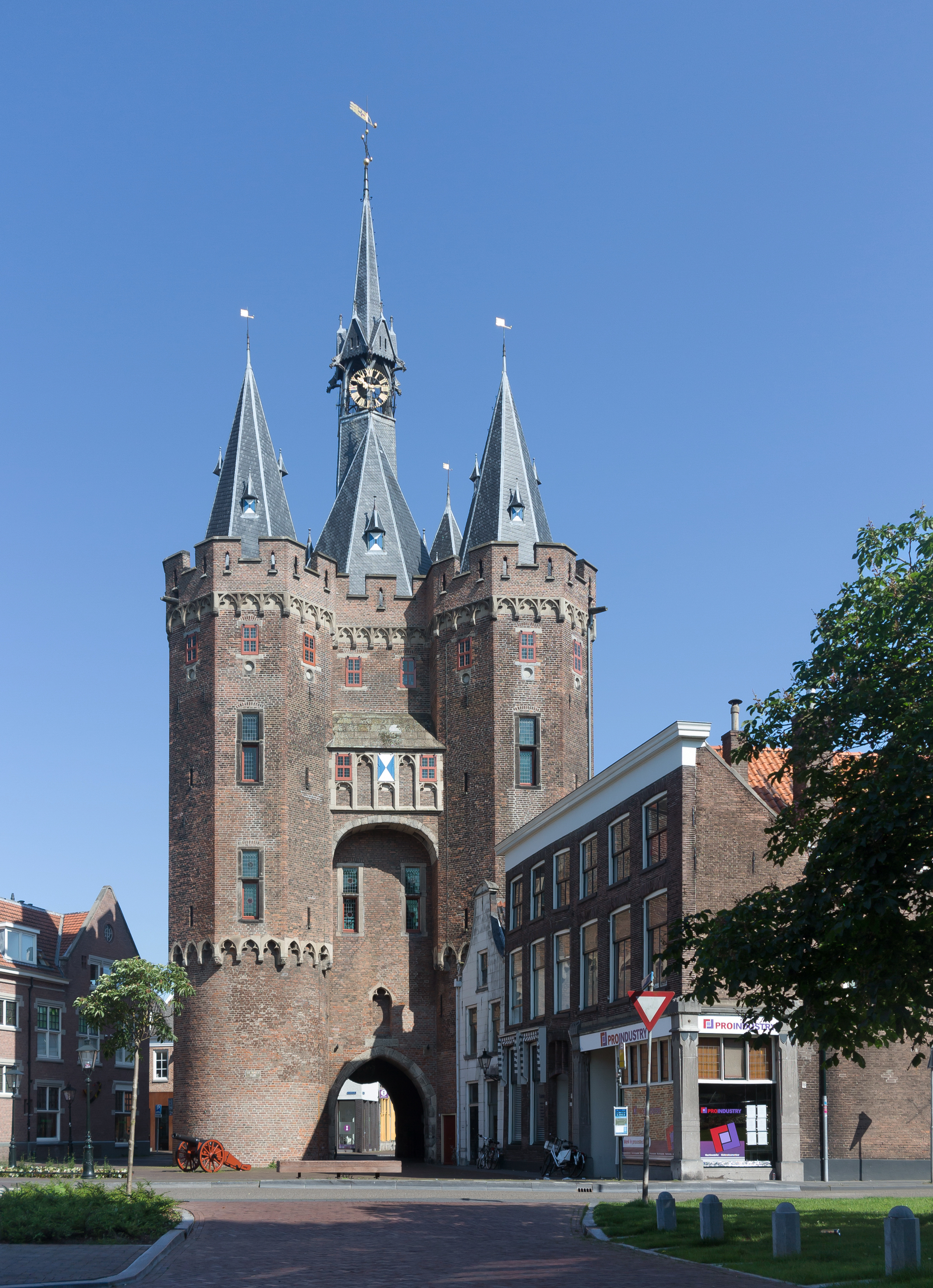
Towngate: De Sassenpoort

The Sassenpoort (English: Saxon Gate) is a gatehouse in the city wall of Zwolle, the Netherlands. It was built in 1409 out of dimension stone, mostly trachyte and tuff, and restoration work was done in 1893-1898. The gatehouse is a rijksmonument and is part of the Top 100 Dutch heritage sites.

== History ==
The city of Zwolle experienced its heyday during the 15th century. It became a member of the Hanseatic League in 1407, and the city gates represent the wealth of this period. In 1893 the city government of Zwolle gave the Sassenpoort to the Dutch national government, as a location to store the national archives, a function the building no longer serves. The building remains to this day property of the national government.

== Building ==
In the period between 1893 and 1898 restoration work took place. The dormers were made, and a neogothic spire clock tower was installed, replacing an earlier 18th-century spire. In between the corner towers is a machicolation. From holes in the floor of this outer work, boiling oil could be thrown at enemies.

== National monument ==
The gatehouse became a rijksmonument on 13 February 1967 and is part of the Top 100 Dutch heritage sites. The national building service classifies the gate as "category I". This category contains monuments of which ownership and preservation by the state is considered of extraordinary cultural historic importance. In order to prevent damage by exhaust gasses, driving under the gate has been prohibited since 2010. The gate now serves as a pedestrian road.

In 2006 TPG Post brought out a stamp in the series Mooi Nederland (beautiful Netherlands) with an image of the Sassenpoort.

== Trivia ==
The Sassenpoort has stained glass windows in which 13 coats of arms can be seen. There should be 14, but one of the coats of arms has disappeared. It is suspected that this coat of arms, of the Ridderschap Overijssel, was located in the window of the current little kitchen. The coats of arms that are still visible are from the following places:

- Delden
- Deventer
- Enschede
- Genemuiden
- Hasselt
- Kampen
- Nederland
- Oldenzaal
- Ootmarsum
- Overijssel
- Steenwijk
- Vollenhove
- Zwolle
