= Top 100 Dutch heritage sites =

List of important Dutch buildings

Emblem of the International Committee of the Blue Shield that uses the protection logo of the Hague Convention of 1954

The Top 100 Dutch heritage sites is a list of rijksmonuments in the Netherlands, established in 1990 by the Department for Conservation (Monumentenzorg, today the Rijksdienst voor het Cultureel Erfgoed). The Top 100 was a selection of historical monuments that were authorized to display the symbol of the Hague Convention of 1954 (the famous blue and white shield, known as the UNESCO shield). The list should not be confused with the UNESCO World Heritage list. The buildings on the list could expect extra security in the context of the policy. The Top 100 list is no longer official, as the extra cultural protection policy is no longer applied. The following Top 100 also includes a list of the most important stained glass, church bells and organs.

Object	Built	Place	Province	Image
Saint Bavo Church	1220	Aardenburg	ZE	
Castle Amerongen	1676	Amerongen	UT	
American Hotel	1900	Amsterdam	NH	
Beurs van Berlage	1903	Amsterdam	NH	
Deutzenhofje	1694	Amsterdam	NH	
Magna Plaza	1899	Amsterdam	NH	
Huis met de Hoofden	1622	Amsterdam	NH	
Museum Amstelkring	1663	Amsterdam	NH	
Oude Kerk	1300	Amsterdam	NH	
Royal Palace of Amsterdam	1655	Amsterdam	NH	
Portugees-Israëlietische Synagoge	1675	Amsterdam	NH	
Rijksmuseum Amsterdam	1885	Amsterdam	NH	
Scheepvaarthuis	1916	Amsterdam	NH	
Het Schip	1920	Amsterdam	NH	
Trippenhuis	1662	Amsterdam	NH	
Het Loo Palace	1685	Apeldoorn	GE	
Nicolaïkerk	1225	Appingedam	Groningen	
Landhuis De Schaffelaar	1852	Barneveld	GE	
Tusschenlanen	1661	Bergambacht	SH	
Markiezenhof	1532	Bergen op Zoom	NB	
Grote of Onze Lieve Vrouwekerk	1410	Breda	NB	
Breda Castle of the KMA	1538	Breda	NB	
Cottessen 5	16th century	Cottessen	LI	
Castle Middachten	1697	De Steeg	GE	
Twickel Castle	16th-19th century	Deldeneresch	OV	
Nieuwe Kerk /Praalgraf Willem van Oranje	1621	Delft	SH	
Sint Agathaklooster	1400	Delft	SH	
Agnetapark	1885	Delft	SH	
Grote or Lebuïnuskerk	11th century	Deventer	OV	
City Hall, Deventer	1694	Deventer	OV	
Slangenburg	17th century	Doetinchem	GE	
Grote or Onze Lieve Vrouwekerk	1542	Dordrecht	SH	
Castle Eijsden	1635	Eijsden	LI	
Westerkerk	1542	Enkhuizen	NH	
City Hall, Enkhuizen	1688	Enkhuizen	NH	
Eisinga Planetarium	1768	Franeker	Friesland	
Franeker City Hall	16th century	Franeker	Friesland	
Stoomgemaal Mastenbroek	1856	Genemuiden	OV	
Sint Janskerk / Goudse glazen	16th/17th century	Gouda	SH	
Naaierstraat 6	1527	Gouda	SH	
Hampoort	1688	Grave, North Brabant	NB	
Korenbeurs	1865	Groningen	Groningen	
Torenmolen Gronsveld	1623	Gronsveld	LI	
Paviljoen Welgelegen	1789	Haarlem	NH	
Teylers Museum	1780	Haarlem	NH	
St. Bavochurch - koorbanken en -hek	1515	Haarlem	NH	
Museum De Cruquius	1849	Haarlemmermeer (Cruquius)	NH	
Museum Bisdom van Vliet	1877	Haastrecht	SH	
Mijnmonument Oranje Nassau 1	1899	Heerlen	LI	
Kathedrale Basiliek van Sint Jan	1250	's-Hertogenbosch	NB	
Sint-Gerlachuskerk	1725	Houthem	LI	
Villa Henny	1919	Huis ter Heide	UT	
Tower Hervormde Kerk IJsselstein	1535	IJsselstein	UT	
City Hall, Kampen	15th century	Kampen	OV	
Abdij Rolduc	1104	Kerkrade	LI	
Sint Annahofje	14th century	Leiden	SH	
d'Heesterboom	1804	Leiden	SH	
Bibliotheca Thysiana	1655	Leiden	SH	
Ir.D.F. Woudagemaal	1918	Lemmer	Friesland	
Sint-Salviuskerk	1000	Limbricht	LI	
Petrus- en Pauluskerk	1200	Loppersum	Groningen	
Spaans Gouvernement	1330	Maastricht	LI	
Helpoort (Maastricht)	1230	Maastricht	LI	
Basilica of Our Lady (Maastricht)	1000	Maastricht	LI	
Basilica of Saint Servatius	1000	Maastricht	LI	
City Hall, Maastricht	1662	Maastricht	LI	
Oostkerk	1647	Middelburg	ZE	
Boerderij De Eenhoorn	1682	Middenbeemster	NH	
Zandstraat 5, boerderij	19th century	Moergestel	NB	
Binnendijk 3, boerderij	1676	Nieuw- en Sint Joosland	ZE	
Jachthuis Sint-Hubertus	1920	Otterlo	GE	
Basiliek H.H. Agatha en Barbara	1880	Oudenbosch	NB	
Meester Kok, boerderij	16th century	Ratum, Winterswijk	GE	
Poort fort Rammekens	1547	Ritthem	ZE	
Munsterkerk	13th century	Roermond	LI	
Van Nelle Factory	1931	Rotterdam	SH	
Justus van Effencomplex	1921	Rotterdam	SH	
Witte Huis	1898	Rotterdam	SH	
De Kiefhoek	1929	Rotterdam	SH	
Castle Rosendael - schelpengalerij	1722	Rozendaal	GE	
Vinkenbaan 14	1911	Santpoort-Zuid	NH	
Paleis Soestdijk	1650	Soestdijk	UT	
Voormalige villa Rams Woerthe	1899	Steenwijk	OV	
Ter Apel Monastery	1465	Ter Apel	Groningen	
Trompenburgh	1672	's-Graveland	NH	
Binnenhof, Buitenhof, Gevangenpoort	1250	The Hague	SH	
Haagse Passage	1885	The Hague	SH	
Huis ten Bosch	1645	The Hague	SH	
Panorama Mesdag	1881	The Hague	SH	
Nieuwe Kerk	1656	The Hague	SH	
Oud-Katholieke Kerk	1772	The Hague	SH	
Teresia van Avilakerk	1841	The Hague	SH	
Huis Schuylenburch	1715	The Hague	SH	
Nirwana-flat	1930	The Hague	SH	
Papaverhof	1921	The Hague	SH	
Mauritshuis	1633	The Hague	SH	
Stiftskerk	12th century	Thorn	LI	
Domtoren	1382	Utrecht	UT	
Rietveld Schröder House	1924	Utrecht	UT	
Kerkenkruis	11th-12th century	Utrecht	UT	
Kruitmolen	1804	Valkenburg	LI	
Valkenburg railway station	1853	Valkenburg	LI	
Castle Valkenburg	1040	Valkenburg	LI	
City Hall, Veere	1474	Veere	ZE	
Duivenvoorde Castle	1631	Voorschoten	SH	
Martinuskerk en -toren	1456	Weert	LI	
City Hall, Weesp	1776	Weesp	NH	
City Hall	1776	Westzaan	NH	
Torenmolen Zeddam	1451	Zeddam	GE	
Huis De Haan	14th century	Zierikzee	ZE	
Noordhavenpoort en Zuidhavenpoort	16th century	Zierikzee	ZE	
City Hall, Zierikzee	14th century	Zierikzee	ZE	
Saint Walburg Church with Library	1564	Zutphen	GE	
Sassenpoort	15th century	Zwolle	OV	
