= Wouda pumping station =

Steam pumping station in Friesland

UNESCO World Heritage Site
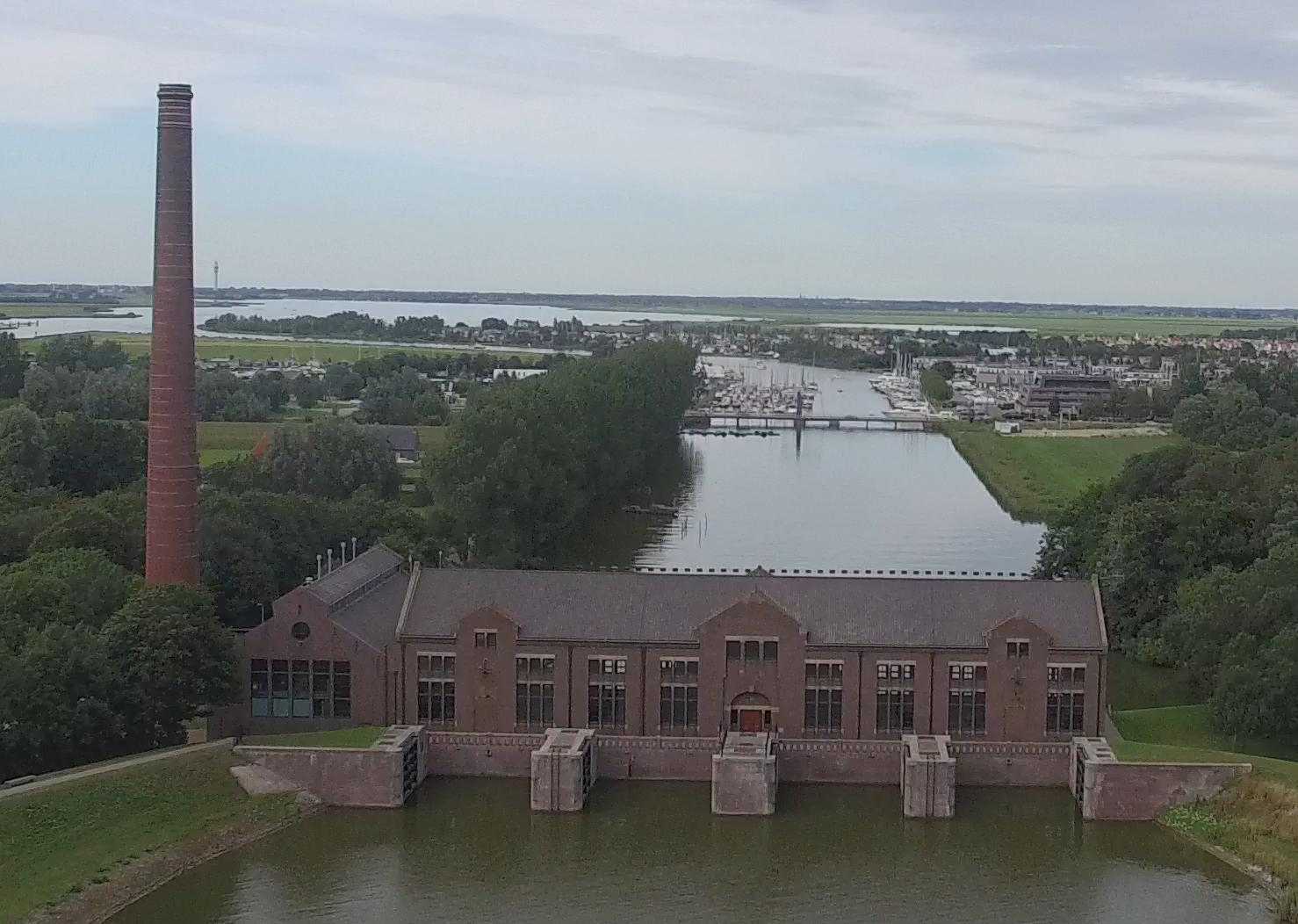

- Location within Friesland Location within Netherlands
- Official name: ir. D.F. Woudagemaal (D.F. Wouda Steam Pumping Station)
- Location: Tacozijl, Lemsterland, De Fryske Marren, Netherlands
- Criteria: Cultural: (i), (ii), (iv)
- Reference: 867
- Inscription: 1998 (22nd Session)
- Area: 7.32 ha (18.1 acres)
- Buffer zone: 20.68 ha (51.1 acres)
- Website: www.woudagemaal.nl
- Coordinates: 52°50′45″N 5°40′44″E

The ir. D.F. Wouda Steam Pumping Station (ir. D.F. Woudagemaal) is a pumping station in the Netherlands, and the largest still operational steam-powered pumping station in the world. On 7 October 1920 Queen Wilhelmina opened the pumping station. It was built to pump excess water out of Friesland, a province in the north of the Netherlands. In 1967, the coal furnaces were converted to run on heavy fuel oil.

It has a pumping capacity of 4,000 m^{3}/min (1,100,000 U.S. gal/min). The pumping station is currently used to supplement the existing pumping capacity of the J.L. Hooglandgemaal in Stavoren in case of exceptionally high water levels in Friesland, which usually happens a few times each year. The pumping station has been listed on the UNESCO World Heritage Site list since 1998

== History ==
The station was named after ir. D.F. Wouda, the chief engineer of the Provincial Water Authority of Friesland. He designed the building in a traditional style with influences of rationalism. During the construction, a lightning storm struck the newly built (but not yet protected) chimney, necessitating its complete reconstruction.

A special canal, the "Stroomkanaal", was dug to feed the station, designed to handle the large volume of water.

== Power and engines ==
The engines, designed by prof. J.C. Dijxhoorn and built by Machinefabriek Jaffa in Utrecht, consist of four tandem-compound main steam engines of 500 IHP and eight double suction centrifugal pumps. Each main steam engine is connected to two pumps. In 1955, six coal-fired Piedboeuf steam boilers were replaced with four flue-pipe boilers from Werkspoor, which were converted to heavy fuel oil in 1967.

The chimney serves not only to expel smoke gases but primarily to induce draft in the boilers, essential for both the combustion air intake and the effective heat exchange in the boilers.

== Operation ==
Until 1966, the station was used to lower the water level of Friesland's polders. It now operates approximately once a year, supplemented by planned operations twice a year to keep the staff skilled. The station operates four tandem compound, reciprocating steam engines, with poppet valves:

- Single acting high pressure cylinder; 0.5 meter diameter.
- Double acting low pressure cylinder, uni-flow exhaust; 0.85 meter diameter.
- Stroke; 1.0 meter.
- 500 horsepower, 373 kilowatt.

The steam engines drive eight horizontal, double suction, centrifugal pumps, each with a pumping capacity of 500 m^{3} per minute. The pumps have a rotational speed of 85 to 115 rpm and an impeller diameter of 1.70 metres.

== Heritage and recognition ==
Listed as a UNESCO World Heritage Site since 1998, the pumping station is also a Rijksmonument and is on the list of Top 100 Dutch heritage sites created by Rijksdienst voor het Cultureel Erfgoed. The station centenary was commemorated with the issuance of a five euro commemorative coin featuring King Willem-Alexander.

The station is open to visitors, with regular tours available.

== Gallery ==
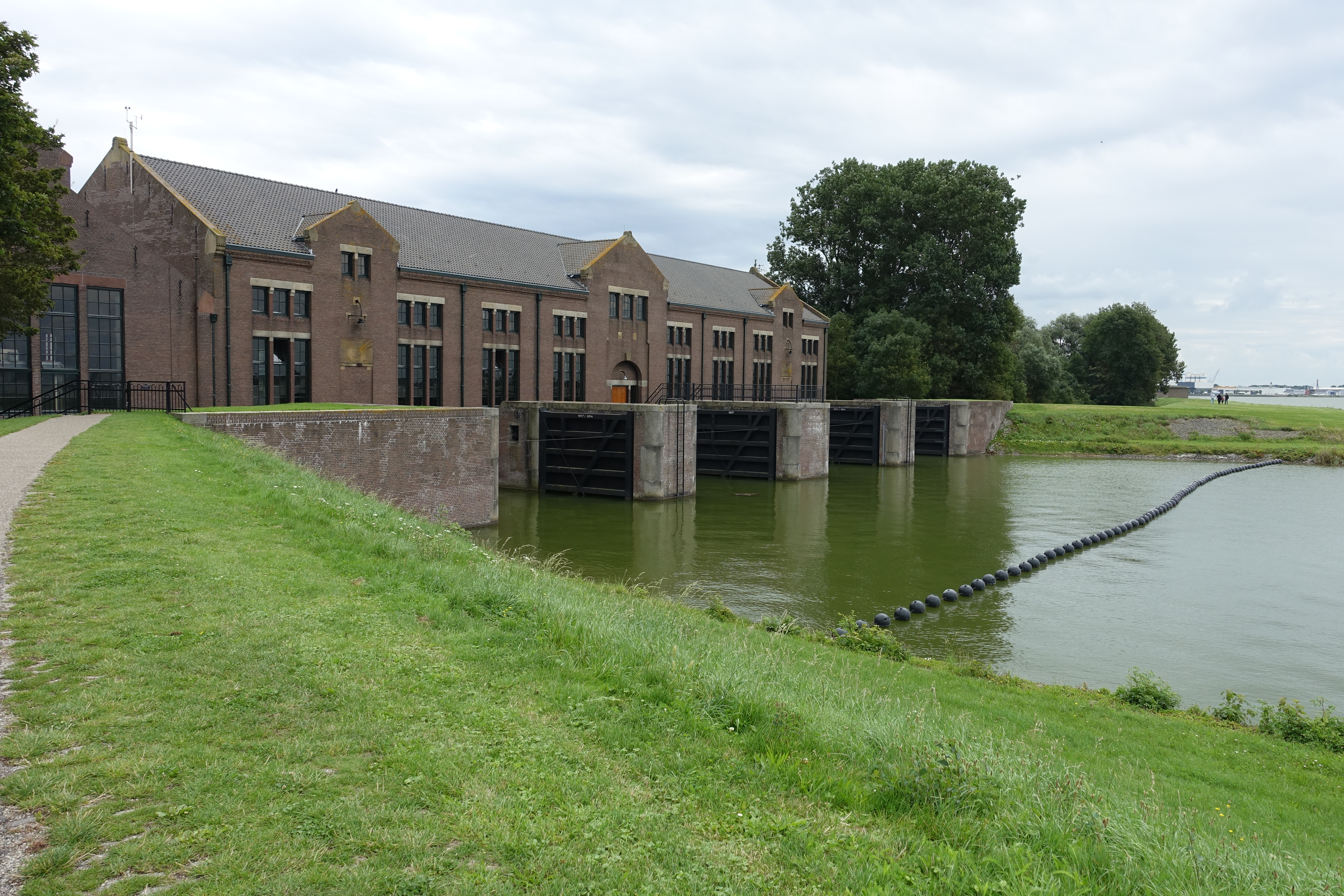
Woudagemaal, IJsselmeer side

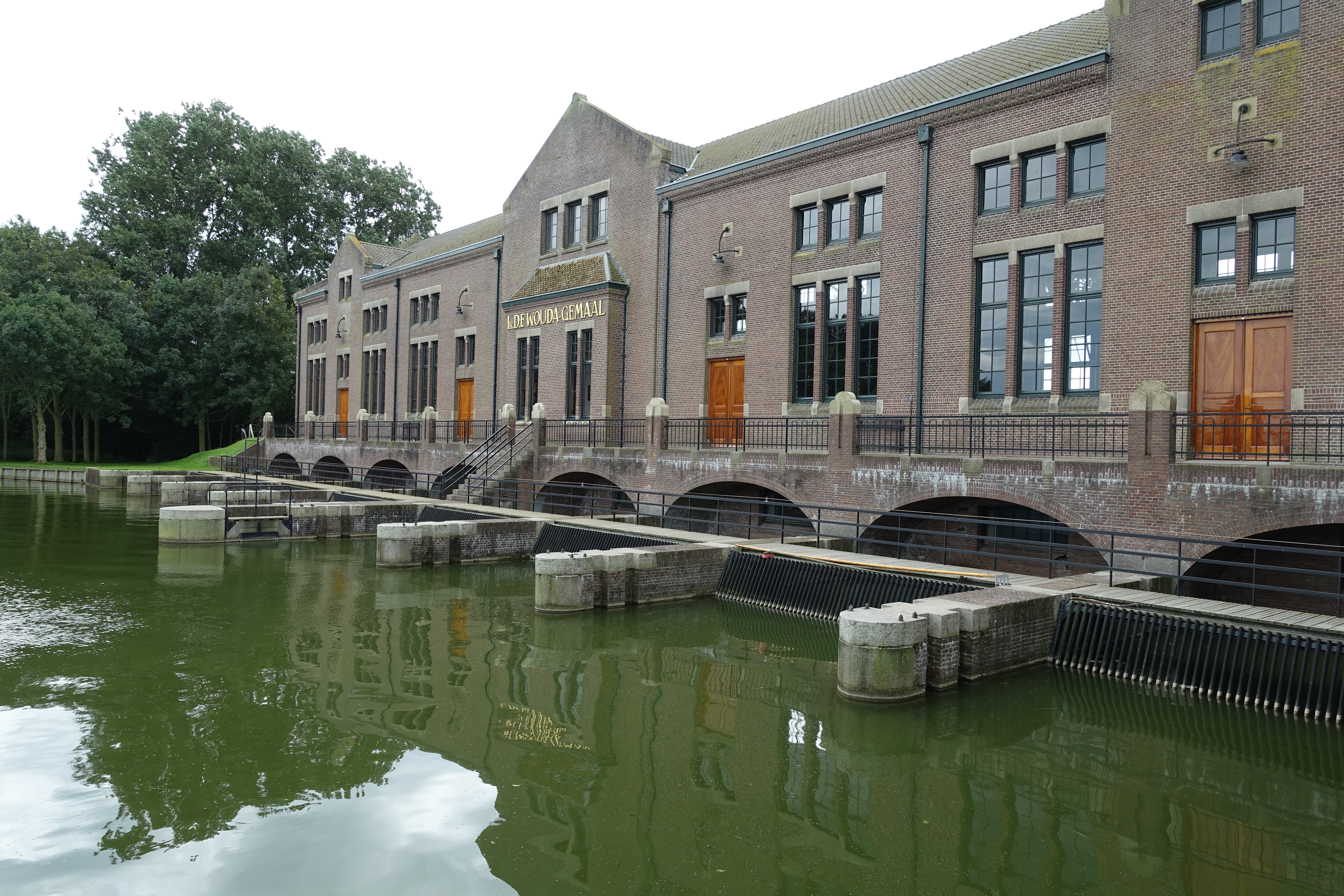
Side of the canal

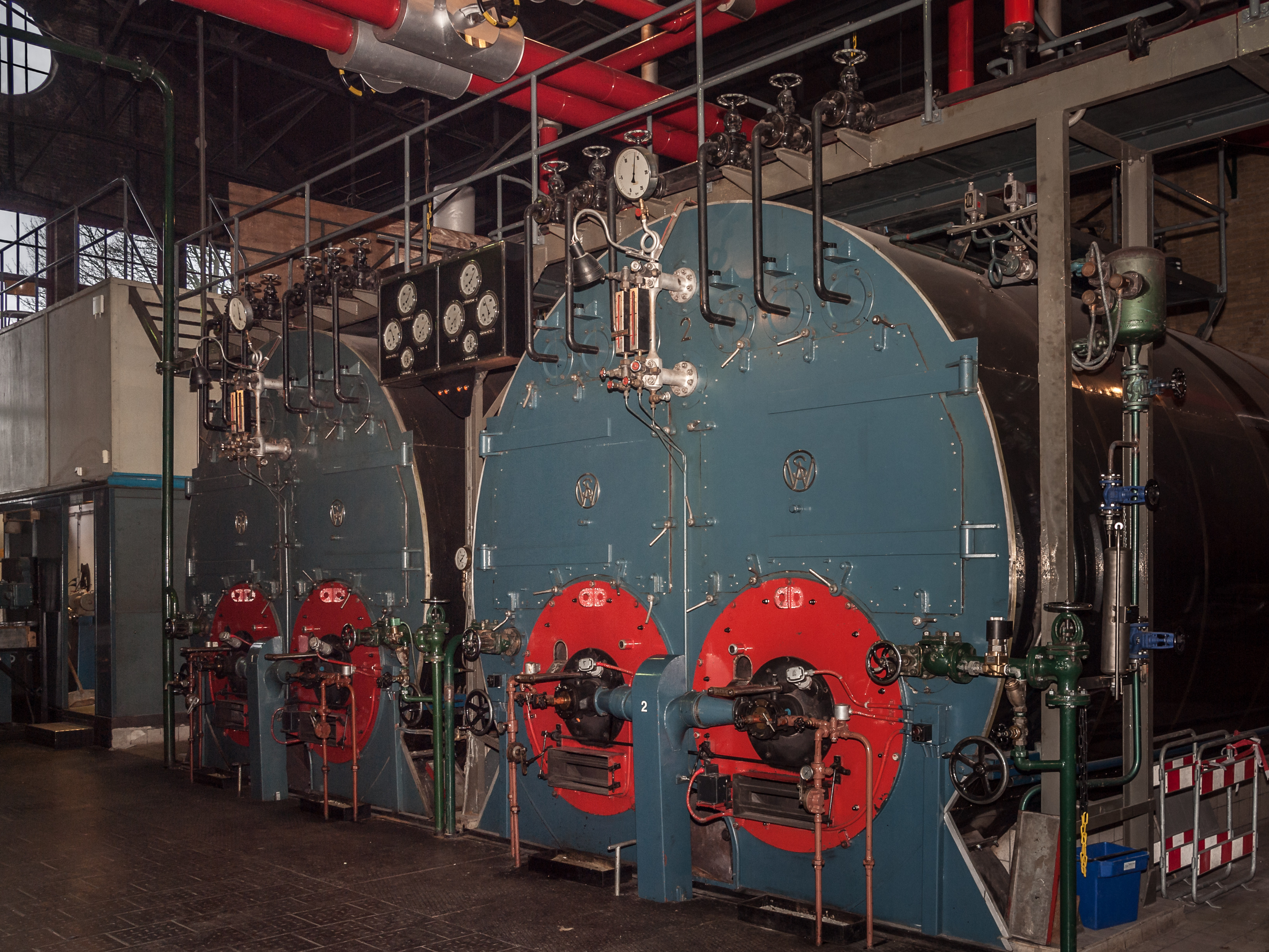
Steam boilers

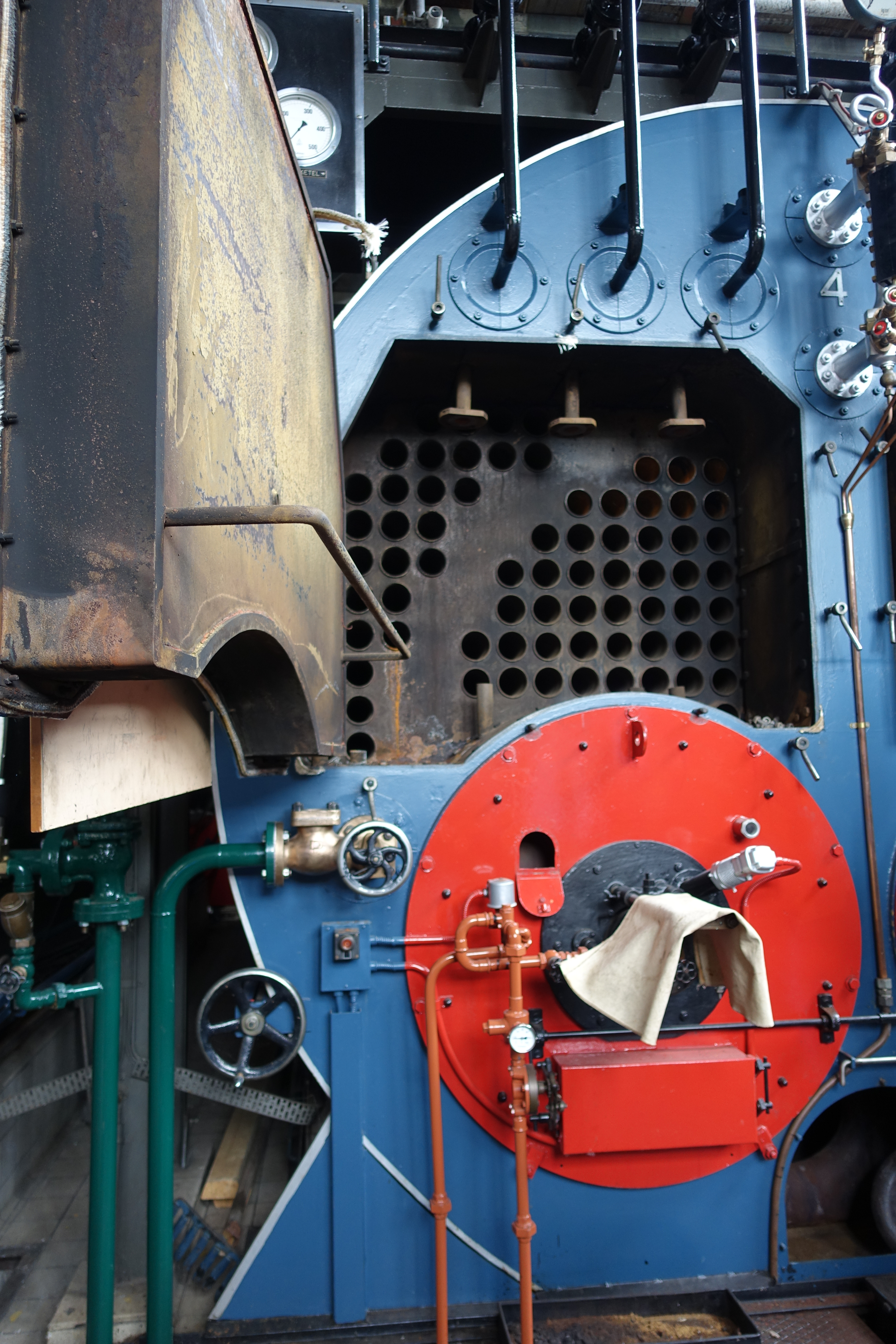
Detail of the boiler with round smoke channels

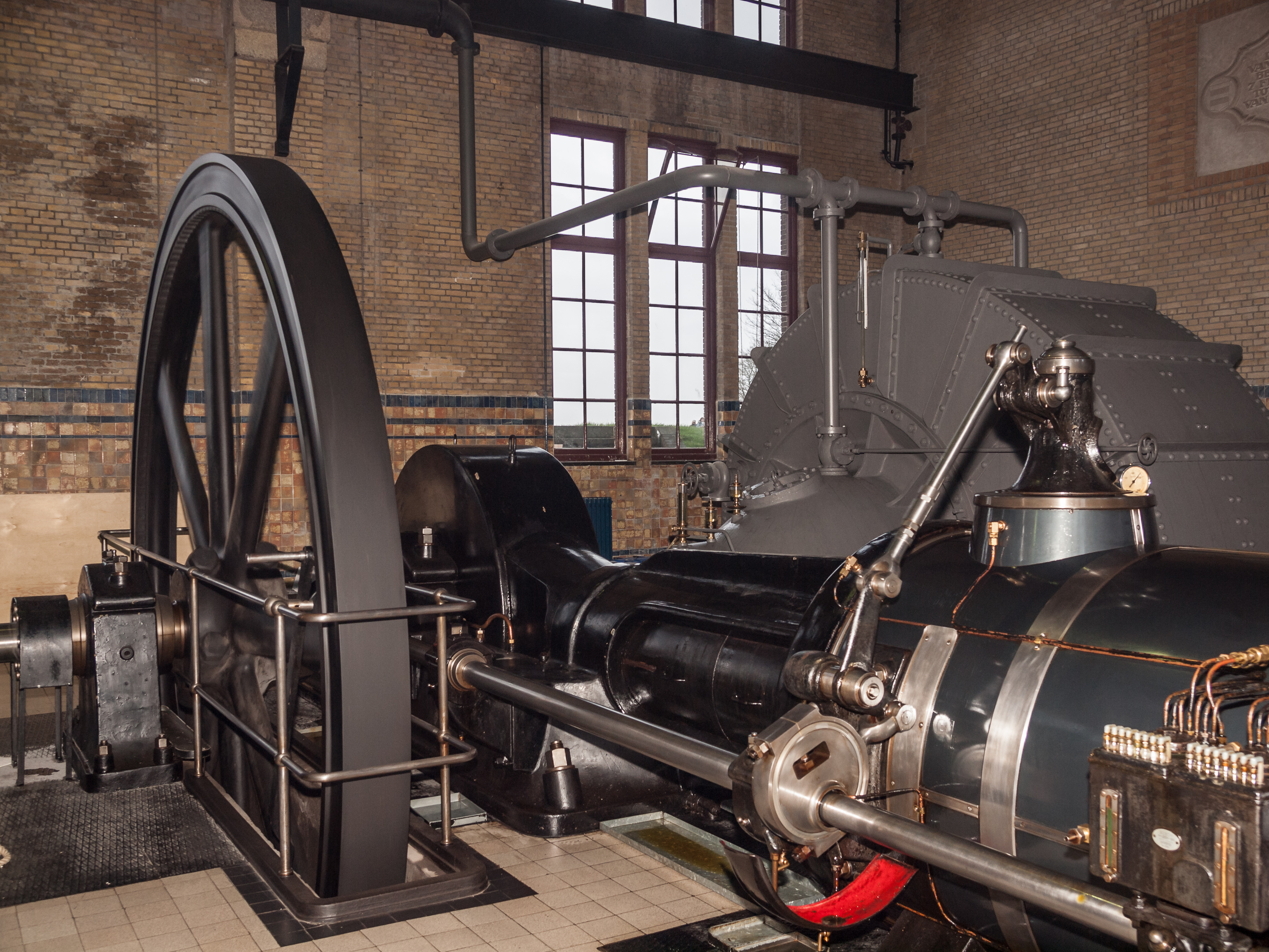
Working steam engine

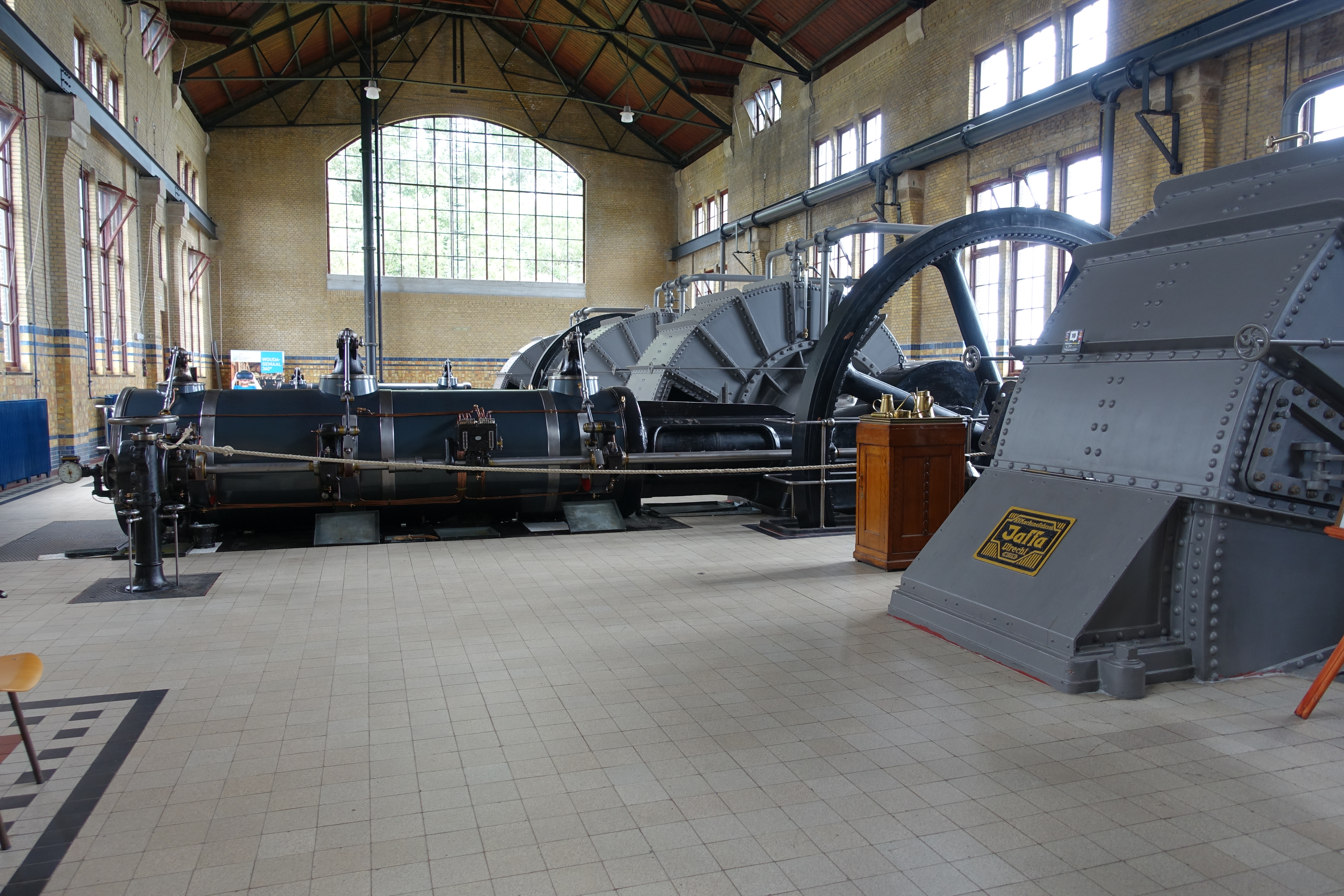
Tandem steam engines with centrifugal pumps and flywheels to the right

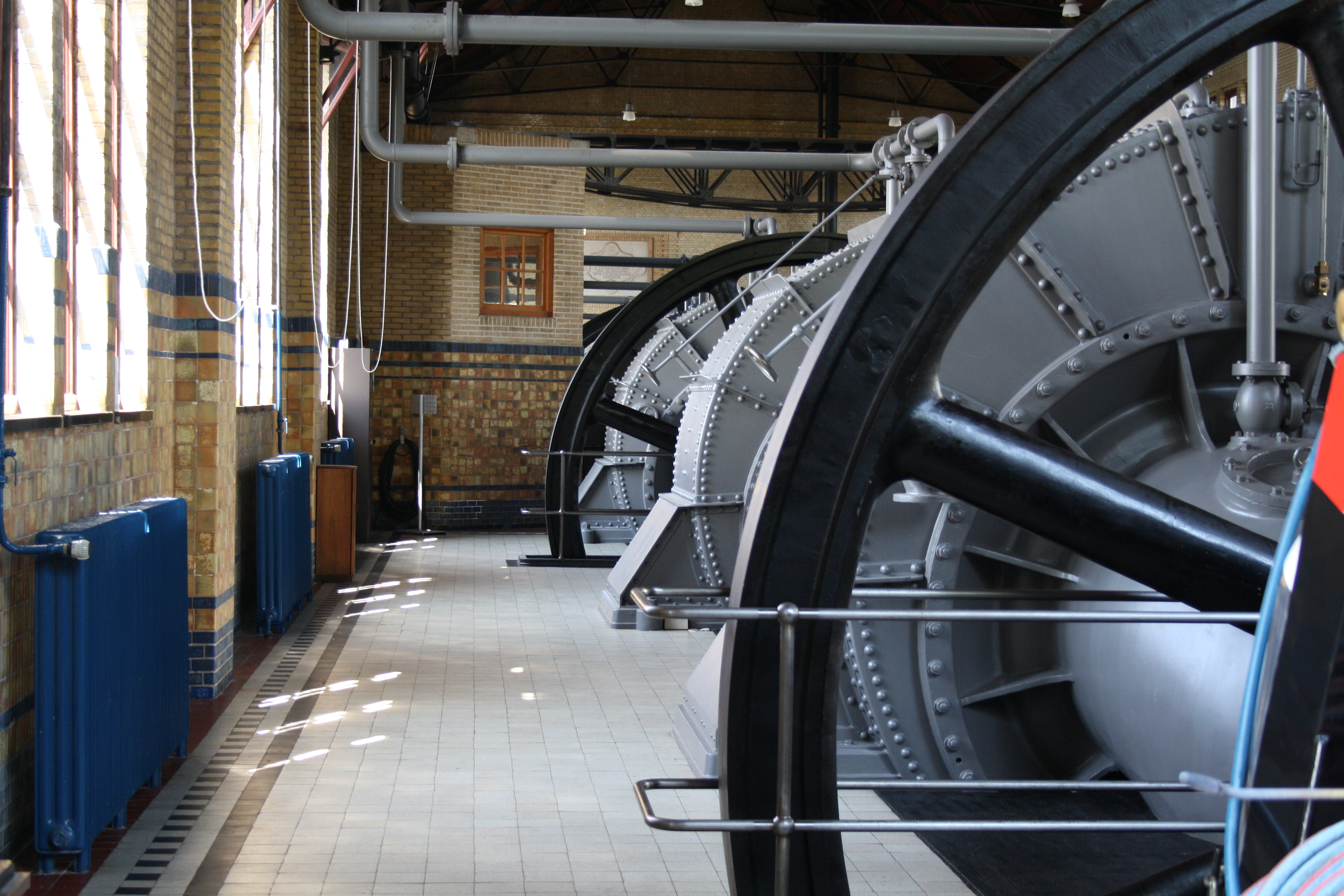
Screw centrifugal pumps and flywheels

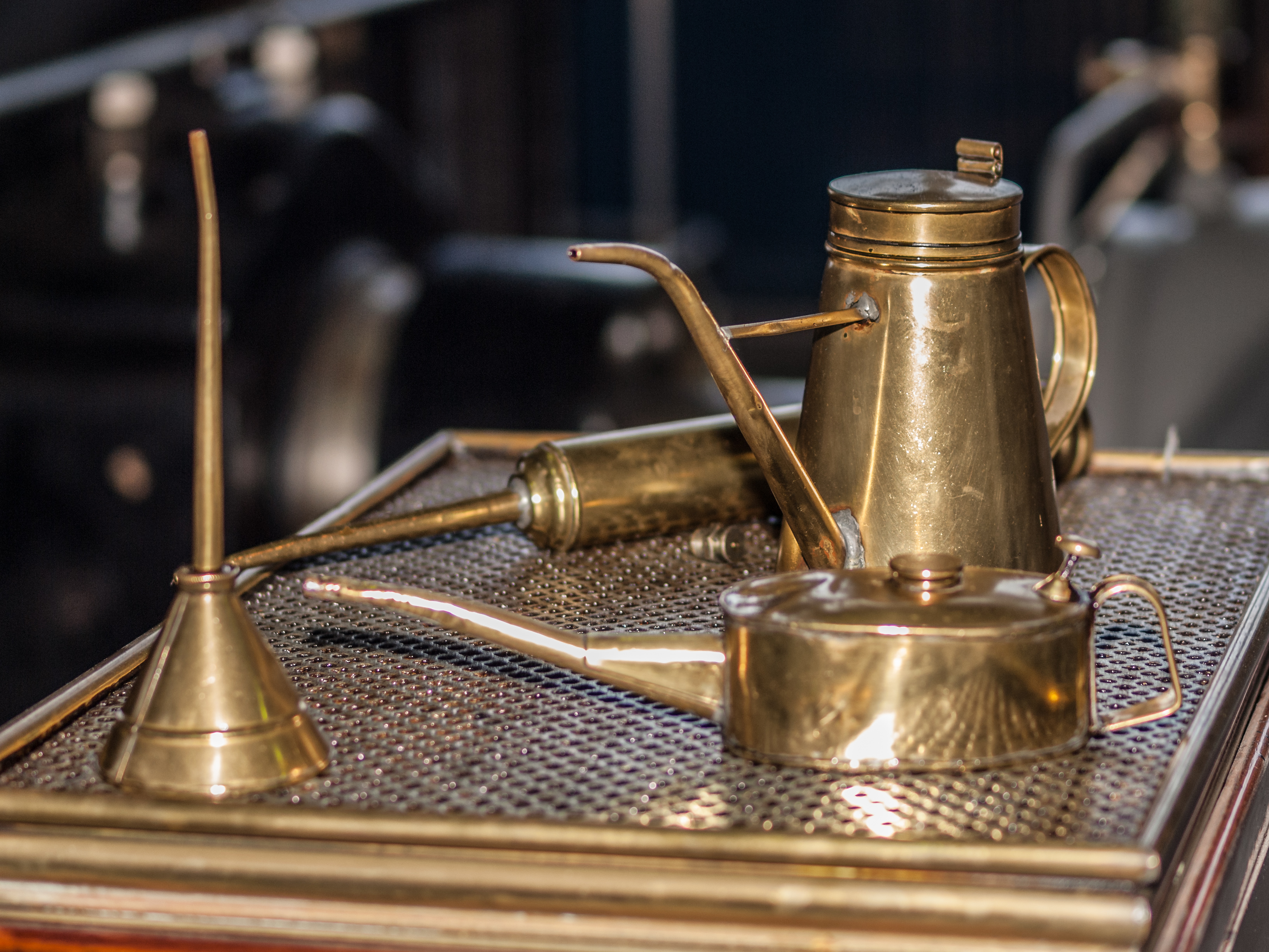
Oil cans

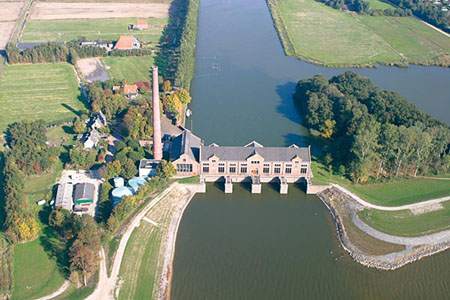
Aerial view
