= Saint Bavo's Abbey =

Abbey in Ghent

Coordinates: 51.0539°N 3.7361°E

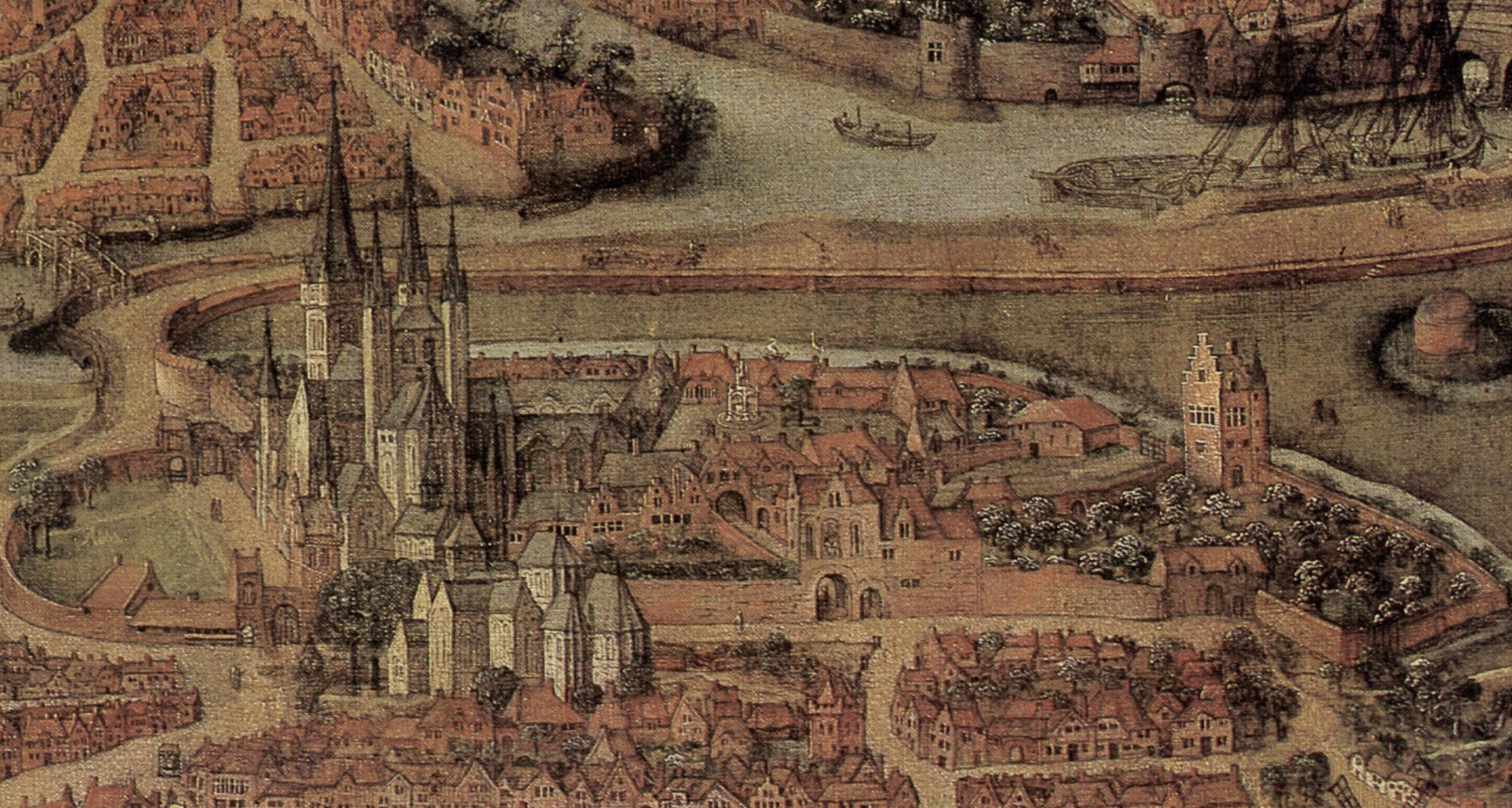
Saint Bavo's Abbey on a map dated 1534, not long before the demolition

Saint Bavo's Abbey (Dutch: Sint-Baafsabdij) is a former abbey in the currently Belgian city of Ghent. It was founded in the 7th century by Saint Amand, who also founded Saint Peter's Abbey, Ghent, near the confluence of the Leie and Scheldt rivers. Originally, the abbey was also called Ganda, a name of Celtic origin, meaning "river mouth", referring to the Leie river debouching into the Scheldt river.

In the 9th century, the abbey was raided twice by Vikings, which made the monks flee to Laon. After an absence of nearly 50 years, they came back to Ghent and re-established the abbey. The German emperor Otto II saw the abbey as a strategic defense point on the Scheldt river (the former border between the Holy Roman Empire and West Francia) in his eternal conflict with Louis V of France.

Painting by Lucas de Heere. The view of the city of Ghent in 1540. In front is Saint Bavo's abbey, later destroyed by Charles V.

Saint Bavo Church in Aardenburg, Netherlands, was founded by monks of the abbey in 959. John of Gaunt, the fourth son of Edward III of England and father of Henry IV of England, was born in the abbey in 1340.

Raphael de Mercatellis was abbot of the abbey from 1478, and used money from the abbey to commission lavish illuminated manuscripts.

In 1540, Charles V ordered the destruction of the abbey. A coercion castle, with its cannons directed at Ghent, was built on the location of the abbey.

The abbot and monks went to nearby St John's church renamed St Bavo's collegiate church, since 1561 the current St Bavo's Cathedral after the foundation of the Diocese of Ghent.
