= Saint Bavo Church =

- Sint-Bavokerk; Sint-Baafskerk
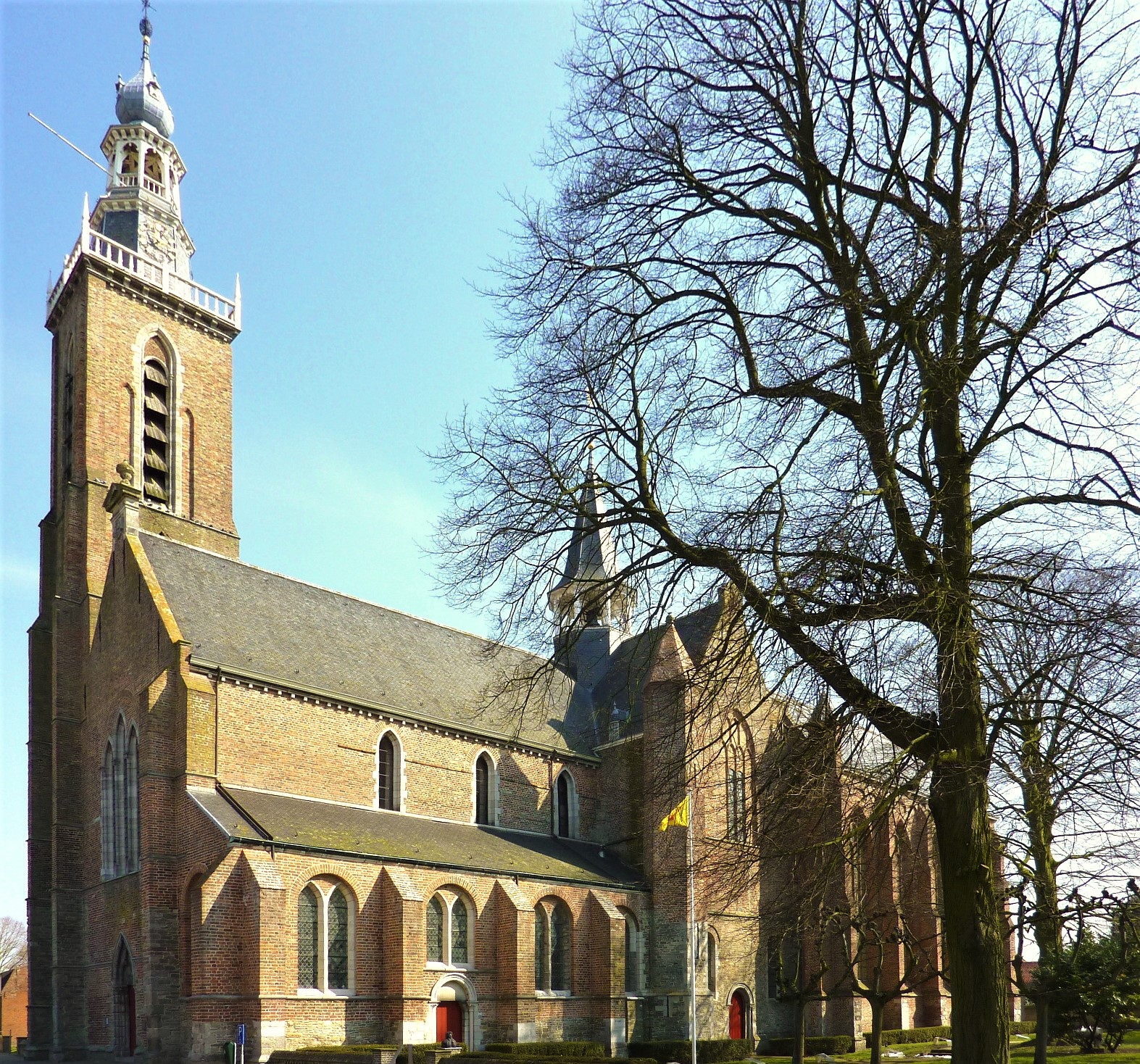
- Saint Bavo Church
- 51.2728°N 3.4483°E
- Location: Aardenburg
- Country: Netherlands
- Denomination: Dutch Reformed Church

History
- Status: Rijksmonument
- Founded: 959 Founded; 1220 Tower, Nave; 1646 Restoration

Architecture
- Functional status: Parish church
- Style: Gothic

The Saint Bavo Church (Dutch: Sint-Bavokerk, Sint-Baafskerk) is a Dutch Reformed church building in Aardenburg, Netherlands.

The church was founded in 959 by monks of the Saint Bavo's Abbey in Ghent. Due to a rise in population this small church was replaced by a Romanesque church which burned down in 1202. In 1220 the current tower, nave and transept were built. During the 14th century the choir was extended.

During the Eighty Years' War the church was damaged. It was subsequently restored in 1646, which is also mentioned on the building.

In World War II, the church again suffered major destructions. The reconstruction took almost a decade, from 1947 to 1956.

The church and tower were separately listed as a rijksmonument on 12 February 1974, making it a national heritage site of the Netherlands. The church is recognized as part of the Top 100 Dutch heritage sites. The church is dedicated to Bavo of Ghent.
