= Oost =

Oost, Dutch for "east", may refer to:

- Jason Oost, Dutch football player
- Oost-Maarland, a village in the Dutch province of Limburg
  - Oost, Limburg, a hamlet in Oost-Maarland
- Oost, North Holland, a hamlet in the Dutch municipality of Texel
- Oost, Rijnmond, a subregion of the Dutch region of Rijnmond
- Oost, Suriname, a town in the Para District of Suriname
- Oost, a borough of Amsterdam, Netherlands
- Oost (river), a river in Hanover, Germany
