= Presqu'île de l'Ilal =

- Ilal Peninsula
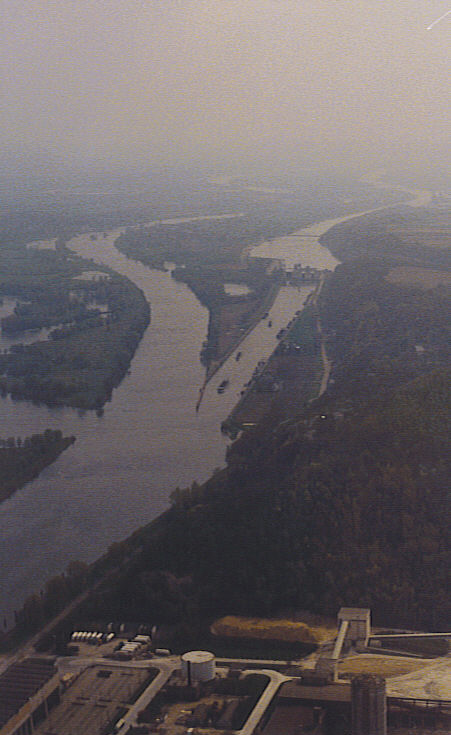
- The Meuse with the peninsula on the left (right: Canal of Ternaaien)

- Location within Limburg, Netherlands
- Location: Eijsden-Margraten, Limburg, Netherlands
- Nearest city: Visé, Belgium
- Coordinates: 50°48′17″N 5°41′46″E
- Area: 0.21 km^{2} (0.081 sq mi)

Presqu'île de l'Ilal (Schiereiland Ilal, "Ilal Peninsula") is a small peninsula and nature reserve in the Meuse river, located in the Dutch municipality of Eijsden-Margraten near Oost-Maarland, on the border with Belgium. It forms part of the larger Eijsder Beemden nature reserve.

The peninsula was one of several parcels of land exchanged between Belgium and the Netherlands on 1 January 2018, in the first peaceful border adjustment between the two countries since the Treaty of Maastricht in 1843.

== History ==
Under the Treaty of London (1839), the area belonged to the Kingdom of Belgium, as it lay on the western (Belgian) bank of the Meuse. Between 1970 and 1979, however, the river was straightened for flood control and navigation. This left Ilal as a peninsula on the eastern bank, physically connected to Dutch territory but legally still Belgian. Access from Belgium became impractical, as no bridge connects Lanaye (Ternaaien) on the Belgian side to Eijsden in the Netherlands.

The situation created unusual law enforcement problems: Dutch officials lacked jurisdiction, while Belgian authorities could only reach the area by boat. The peninsula became known locally as a vrijplaats (lawless zone).

Two other parcels were similarly affected: the smaller Presqu'île d'Eijsden to the south near Eijsden harbour, and Petit-Gravier, situated between the two near the canal locks at Lanaye. Petit-Gravier presented the reverse situation: Dutch territory that had become physically connected to Belgium.

In June 2016, the Walloon and Dutch governments signed a memorandum of understanding to exchange these three territories between Visé (Belgium) and Eijsden-Margraten (Netherlands). The border correction took effect on 1 January 2018.

== Republic of Snoravia ==
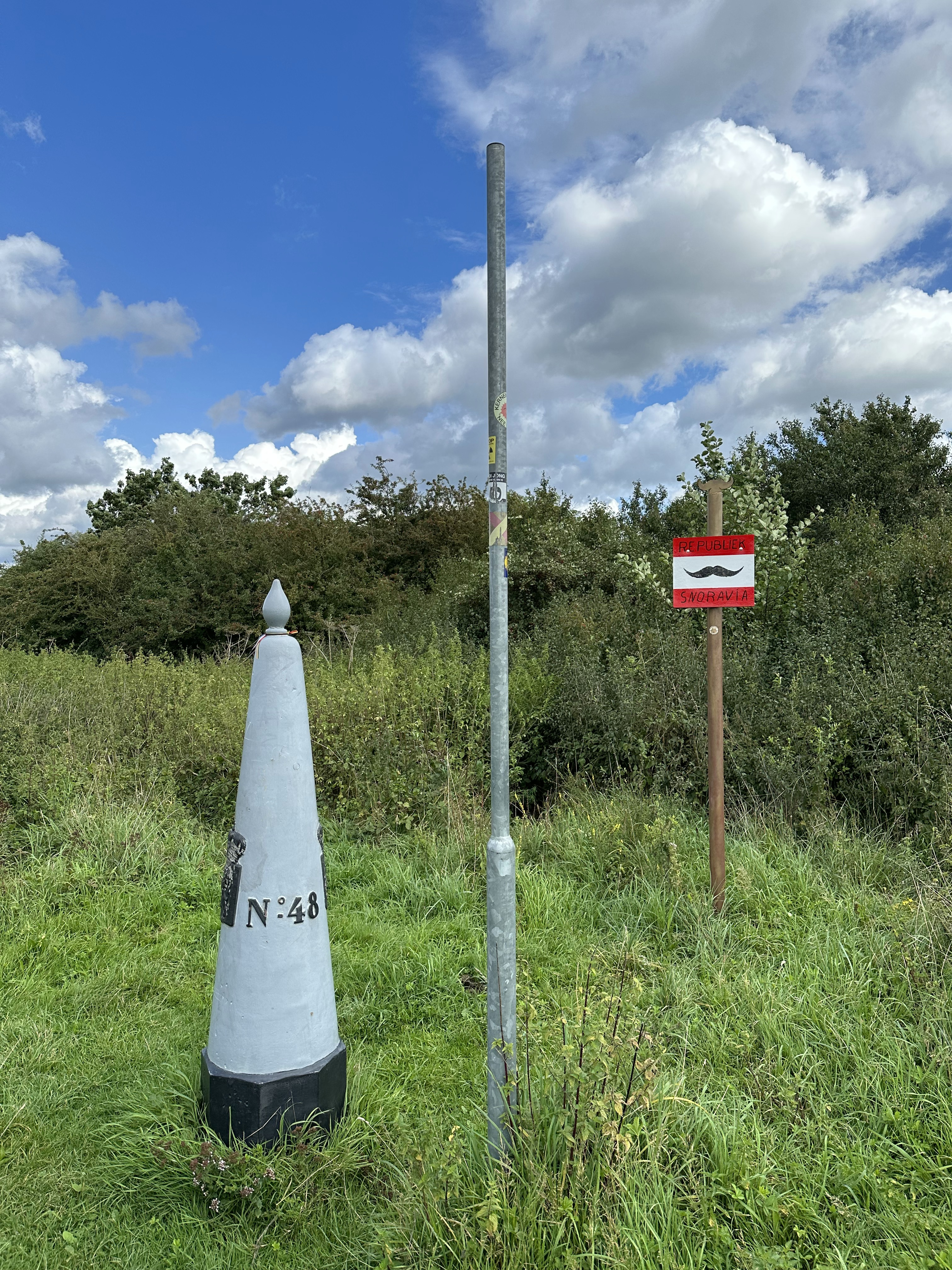
The "Republic of Snoravia" sign next to border marker 48 at the entrance to the peninsula

The peninsula has been claimed tongue-in-cheek as the "Republic of Snoravia" (Republiek Snoravia) by the Antwerp Moustache Club (Snorrenclub Antwerpen). The club staged a mock invasion in June 1987, during a period when both the Netherlands and the Walloon politician José Happart were disputing sovereignty over the area, and members have held an annual pilgrimage there ever since.

When the territory was transferred to the Netherlands in 2018, King's Commissioner Theo Bovens of Limburg assured the club they would remain welcome. Bovens, himself a moustache wearer, was named the club's "Moustache of the Year" for 2023.

== See also ==
- Belgium–Netherlands border
- List of national border changes (1914–present)
