= Groeve Moerslag =

Quarry and monument in the Netherlands

Coordinates: 50°47′22.63″N 5°45′35.5″E

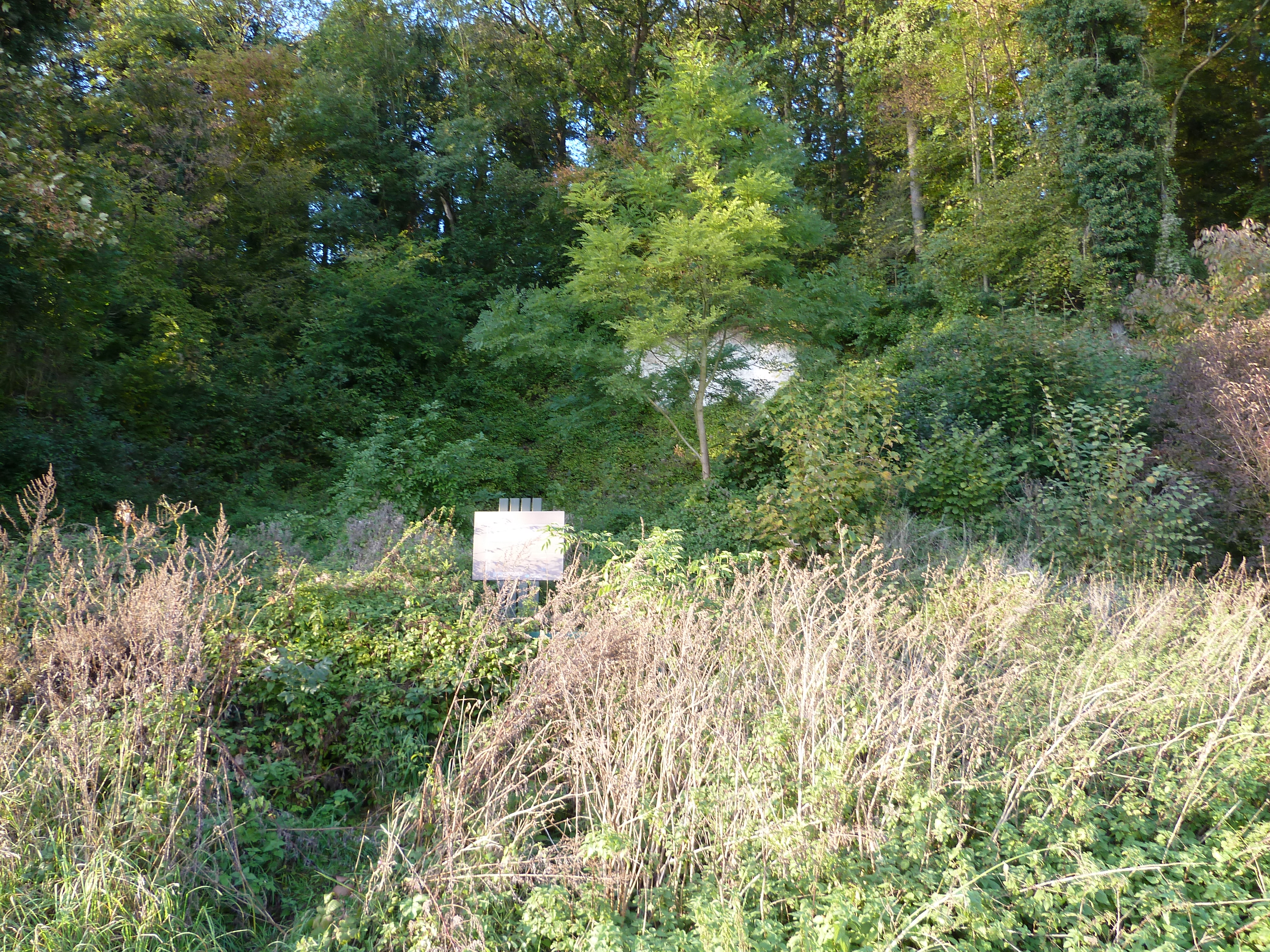
Groeve Moerslag

Groeve Moerslag is a limestone quarry and geological monument located in the municipality of Eijsden-Margraten, Netherlands. The above-ground quarry is situated on the Bukel, northeast of Moerslag in the Herkenradergrub, southwest of Sint Geertruid, and at the southern edge of the Eijsderbos, part of the Savelsbos. The open-pit quarry is located at the western edge of the Plateau of Margraten where it transitions into the Maas valley. Here, the plateau drops steeply several meters.

== History ==
The quarry was historically used to extract limestone, which was then used for liming (fertilization) of fields and pastures.

== Geology ==
During the Upper Cretaceous, approximately 80 to 65 million years ago, this area was covered by a sea where countless skeletal remains of small organisms (plankton) settled on the seabed.

Beneath a thin layer of slope debris in this area lies the Lixhe Limestone from the Gulpen Formation, which was deposited during the Upper Cretaceous and is exposed in this quarry, one of the few places where it is visible. This limestone layer is white in color and contains many irregular flints. Due to the presence of flint, this limestone is unsuitable for use as a building material.

The Rijks Geological Service conducted a drilling in the floor of this limestone quarry, reaching a depth of more than 80 meters. This drilling revealed the Wahlwiller Horizon and, at a depth of 49.2 meters, the Vijlen Limestone, which contains no flints. Further drilling reached the Vaals Formation at 82.6 meters, consisting of greenish glauconitic sands with a thickness of 33.4 meters. Drilling continued to a depth of 82.6 meters, reaching the top of the Namurian Limestone.

On top of the limestone, sand and Maas gravel from the St. Geertruid Member were deposited by the West Maas River.
