= Oost, Limburg =

Village in the south of the Netherlands

Coordinates: 50°47′44″N 5°42′37″E

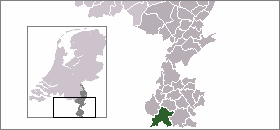
Location municipality Eijsden-Margraten

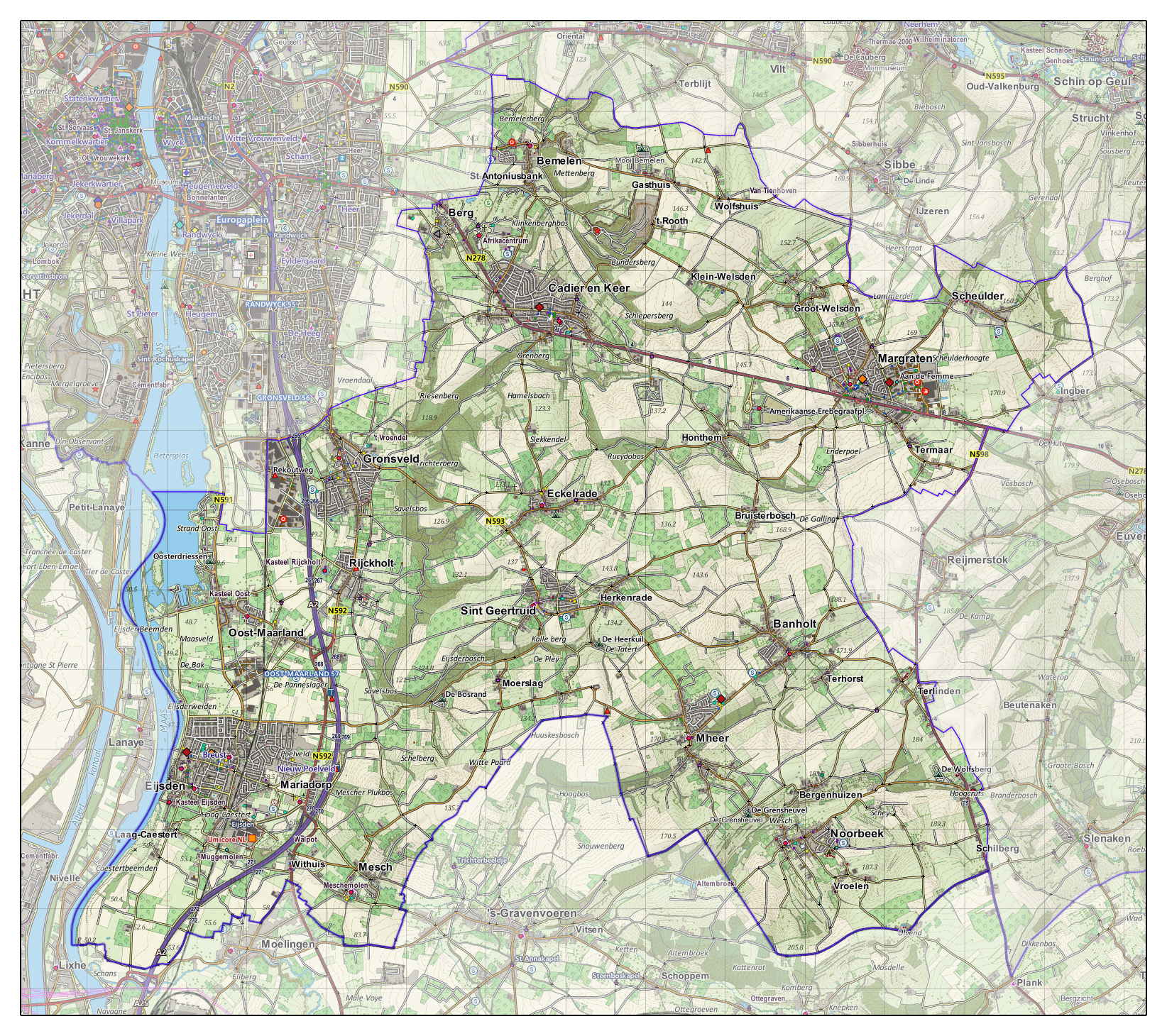
Map Eijsden-Margraten with Oost on the left, near the dark blue water; (best visible after three clicks on map))

Oost is a village (and a former municipality) in the south of the Netherlands. There it is situated near the "Maas" ("Meuse") river in the southwestern part of the province of Limburg.

Oost is the larger part of the merged administrative population centre of Oost-Maarland, which is part of the municipality of Eijsden-Margraten. This municipality borders with Belgium to the south and to the west. To the west that border mostly corresponds with the Meuse river. As Oost is situated in the westernmost part of this municipality, to the west its outlying area borders the Meuse river and Belgium.

Oost has more than 600 inhabitants and is situated 7 kilometers (4.3 mi) south of the city of Maastricht and 3 kilometers north of Eijsden, which is the largest place in the municipality.

== History ==
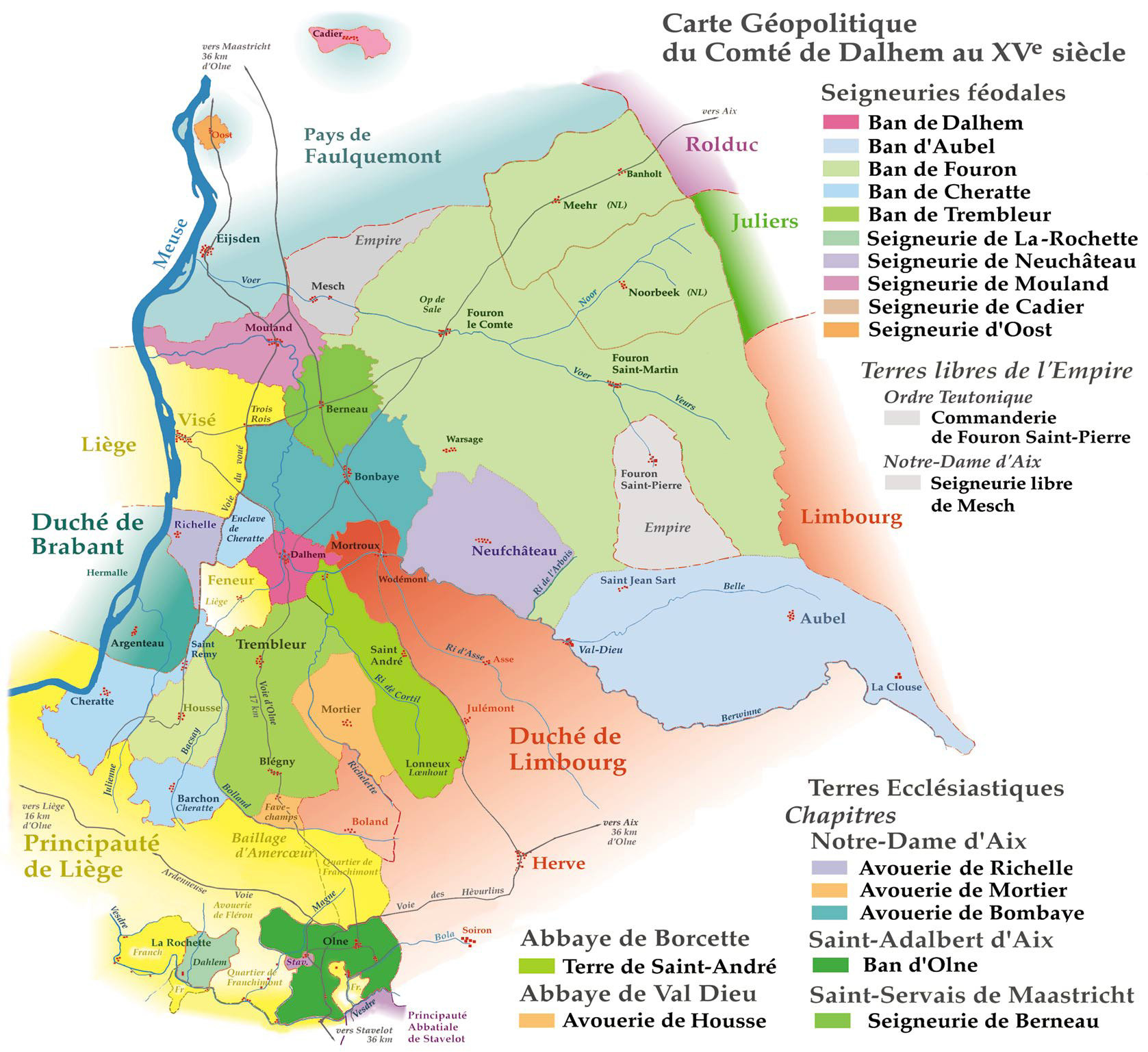
Dalhem county with upperleft the "ban" of Oost

The region around Oost has a complex history, but significantly, many centuries ago, Oost was a seignory and its own municipality and a "ban" (judicial district) of the Dalhem county. Since the Peace of Münster in 1648 it is part of the Northern Netherlands.

In 1828, Oost was merged with the nearby Eijsden municipality.

At the same time Maarland, the separate village a few hundred meters to the south east, that was part of another municipality also became part of Eijsden, and was joined with Oost. The name of this new 'administrative centre' became "Oost-Maarland".

On January 1, 2011, the Eijsden municipality merged with the neighbouring municipality of Margraten and so Oost became part of the Eijsden-Margraten municipality.

== Name perils ==
The name "Oost-Maarland" could lead to some confusion as "Oost" is also the Dutch word for "East", so it might be expected to be the eastern part of the merged village (or a place called Maarland). Oost and Maarland are situated beside one other, but Oost (despite its name) is the western part, near the river Meuse and Maarland is the southeastern part of the community. In fact, "Oost en Maarland" ("Oost and Maarland") would be a clearer place-name.

The origin of the name "Oost" has surprisingly nothing to do with location. It is said to be derived from "Augusta". Once Saint Augusta of Treviso was the patron saint of the village, that then was called "Augustakirchen", after the church, that then was there, dedicated to that saint. By the 18th century already the name had been deformed to "Aoust").

== Economy ==
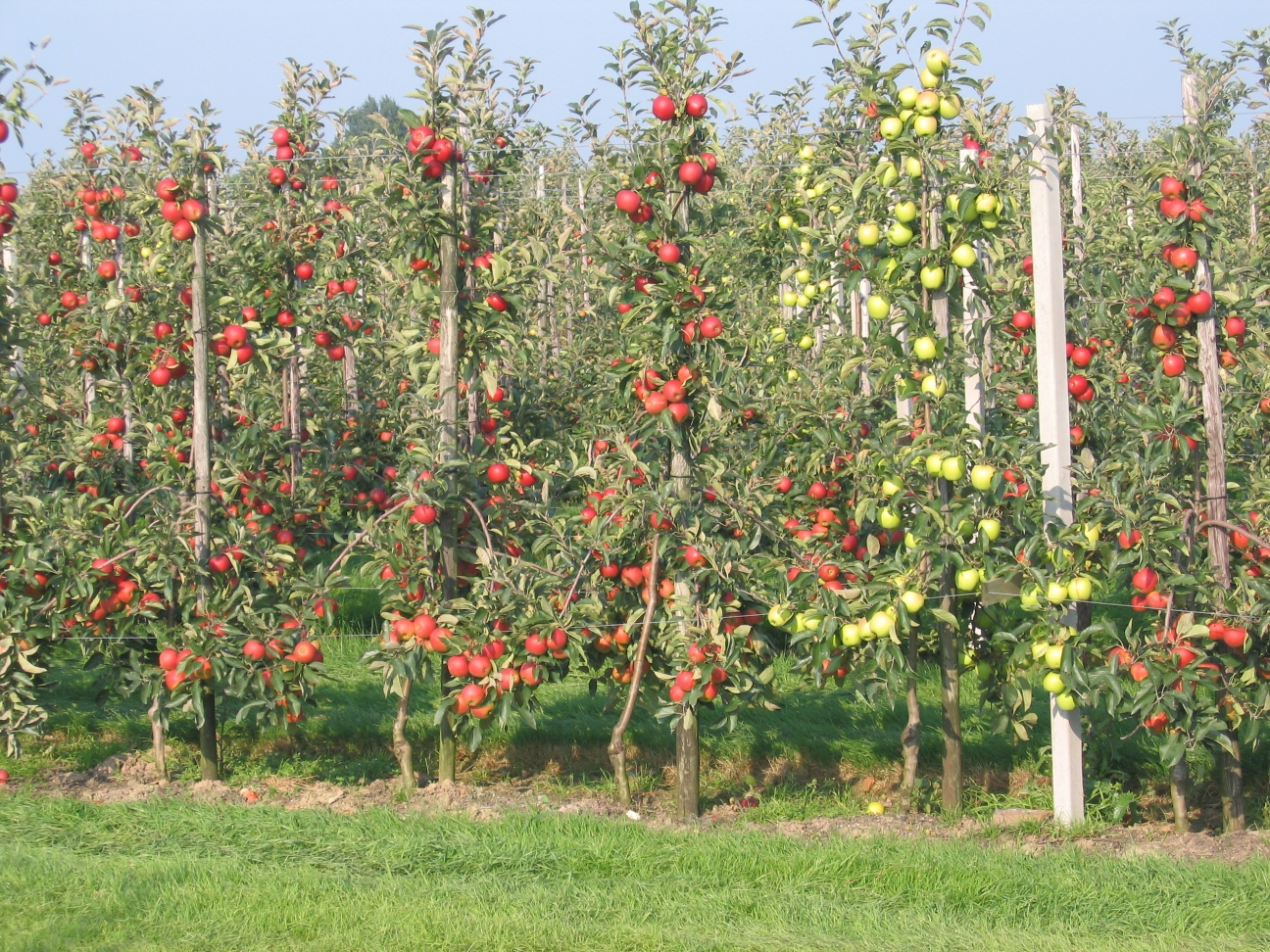
Intensive apple growing

The main economic activities in the village have, for generations, been (and still partially are with several working farms):

- Fruit growing (apples, pears, prunes, cherries, strawberries).
- Grain growing (wheat, barley, corn)
- Cattle farming (milk cows, hen's eggs)

Naturally jobs in industry and services in nearby larger settlements have been and still are providing employment to villagers.

Furthermore, since a number of farms have lost (a considerable part of) their agricultural land to several causes, such as extraction of grit in the river area and small industrial as well as housing projects, most of them have been rebuilt thus, that in former business buildings like stables now touristic apartments are rented out.

== Culture ==
- Apart from a citizen soldiery, which has its own yearly events, there's other folklore in this village, like in many other villages in this region, on their separate festival days with a religious background. This festival, called the "Bronk", starts on a Sunday in June, July or August with a procession in which the priest carries the Blessed Sacrament through the streets of the village, which for that occasion are festively decked. A typical element of these processions is the fact that on multiple stops in their route temporary altars are built, in front of which flower carpets have been laid out. When these piousnesses have ended around noon, two or three days of feasting follow. One folkloristic part of this event is the round dancing called "Cramignon", which also takes place in the streets, whereas the involved are moving from café to café, (but not to drink coffee).
- For a long time constantly a number of inhabitants of this village have been either musicians or board members of the military band St. Cecile, which is based in the neighbouring Eijsden and has several times ended on the first place in the highest Concert division of the World Music Contest at Kerkrade.

== Nature ==
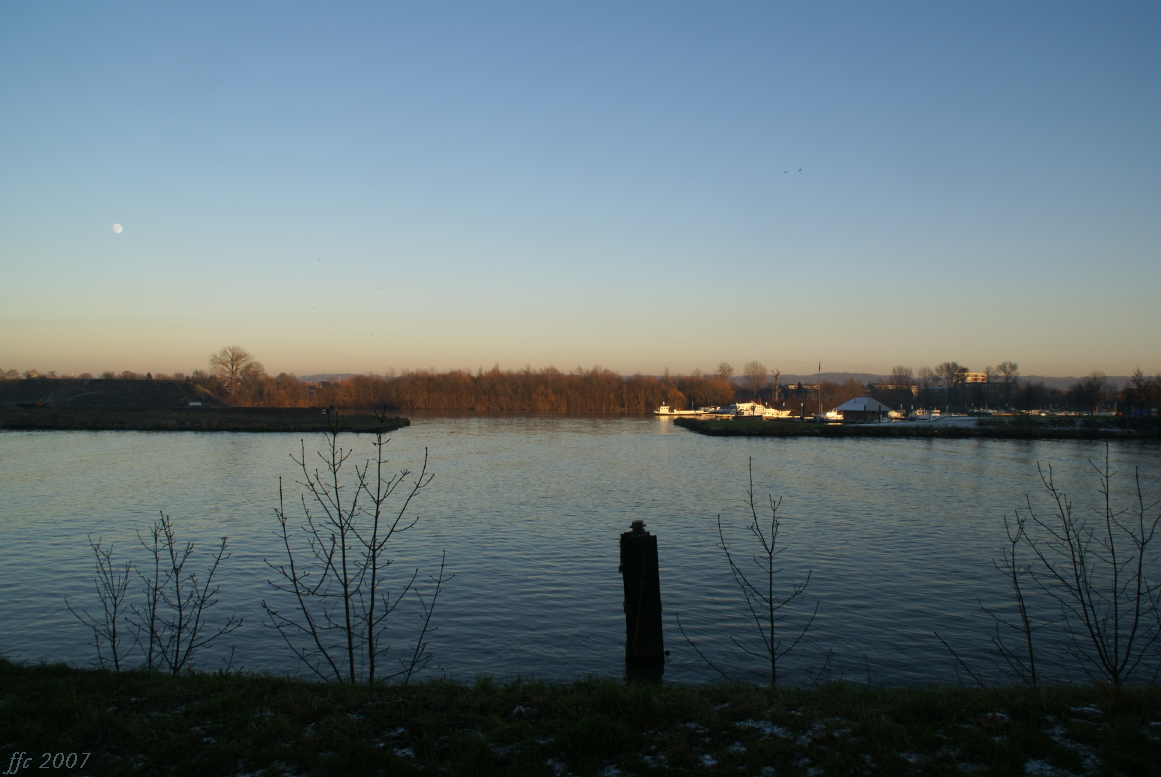
Near Oost the Albert Canal is connected with the Meuse river through the Lanaye canal

To the west and northwest of the village a considerable part of its former fruit-tree area were lost by the extraction of grit, which was abundantly present in the soil near the river. By now there's a lot of water around there, some water-recreation and some wild nature: the riverside nature reserve of "Eijsder beemden" ("Eijsden meadows", which in fact are the "Oost meadows").

Primarily to the north and east of the village there are still large agricultural areas with orchards, fruit plantations, grazing pastures and arable fields. Due to a nearby constructed highway, some business buildings and a reallocation however since the second half of the seventies the composing grounds with names as "Oosterbroek" and "Overbroek" have lost an considerable part of their former country charm, which also was so special as a result of their situation in the Meuse valley, with on both the east and the west side green afforested flanks of two bordering plateaux .
