= Oost-Maarland =

- Village
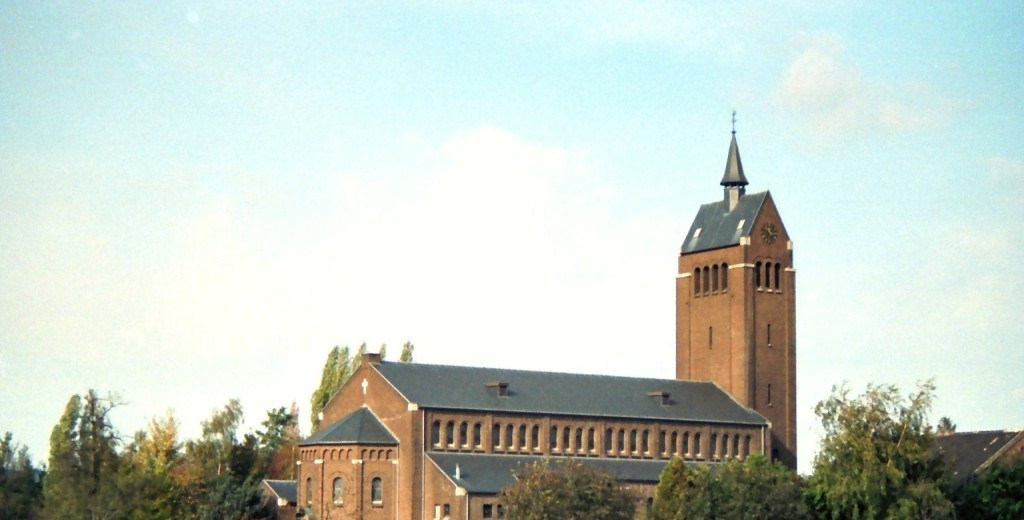
- St Jozefkerk at Oost, also attended by inhabitants of Maarland

- Location in the Netherlands Location in the province of Limburg in the Netherlands
- Coordinates: 50°47′41″N 5°42′47″E
- Country: Netherlands
- Province: Limburg
- Municipality: Eijsden-Margraten

Area
  - Total: 1.10 km^{2} (0.42 sq mi)
- Elevation: 56 m (184 ft)

Population (2021)
  - Total: 950
  - Density: 860/km^{2} (2,200/sq mi)
- Time zone: UTC+1 (CET)
  - Summer (DST): UTC+2 (CEST)
- Postal code: 6245
- Dialing code: 043
- Major roads: A2

Oost-Maarland is a village in the south east of the European country Netherlands. There it is an administrative population centre in the Eijsden-Margraten municipality, which forms part of the province of Limburg. In fact Oost-Maarland consists of two separate places with a different history. One is the village and former municipality of Oost, whereas the other is an in a distance of a few hundred metres separately to the southeast situated township called Maarland.

Oost-Maarland is located some 3 km north of Eijsden, the biggest place in the municipality and 7 kilometers (4.3 mi) south of Maastricht, the provincial capital. In its northeast it borders Rijckholt and in its east and southeast the Sint Geertruid part of the Savelsbos hillside forest, which is part of the "Margraten plateau". In the west it borders the Meuse river, across which marks the border with Belgium, specifically the Liège province of Wallonia.

In between Maarland and this forest since a few decennia passes the E25 highway. In between Oost and Maarland passes the railroad Liège-Maastricht. The former station on this location however doesn't exist any more.

Of the total number of about 960 inhabitants Oost has some more than 600 and Maarland some more than 300.

== History ==
Historically Oost and Maarland are two different places.

Oost once was a seignory and a municipality of its own. (A castle and a (by now folkloristic) civic guard still witness of this era). As such for centuries Oost was a "ban" of the Dalhem county. Since the Peace of Münster in 1648 it is part of the Northern Netherlands.

Maarland once was a separately situated township of the signory of Breust, which in its turn belonged to the Liège St. Martin church. When in 1828 Breust and Oost became part of the Eijsden municipality, Maarland (which has no basic school, nor a church of its own) was added to Oost.

Thus until 1 January 2011 Oost-Maarland was part of the Eijsden municipality; on that date this municipality merged with the neighbouring one of Margraten.

From 1 January 2018, the Netherlands and Belgium peacefully swapped territory on the River Meuse just west from Maarland, in an agreement signed in 2016.

== Place name ==
Although Maarland since 1828 is a township of Oost, the relevant administrative population centre then was named "Oost-Maarland". This name is somewhat confusing as Oost is also the Dutch word for East, so that it seems as if this place were the eastern part of Maarland. Besides Oost and Maarland are situated aside each other, but Oost (despite its name) on the western side, near the river Meuse and Maarland just to the southeast. So "Oost en Maarland" ("Oost and Maarland") as a name would be more clear.

The name "Oost" by the way has nothing to do with location. It is said to be derived from "Augusta". Once Saint Augusta of Treviso was the patron saint of this village, that then was called "Augustakirchen", after the church, that then was there, dedicated to that saint. By the 18th century already the name had been deformed to "Aoust").

== Culture ==
Apart from the Oost civic guard there is other folklore in this village; like in many other villages in this region, mostly on festival days. In Oost-Maarland some of these are joint and others are separate.

There's also a common soccer club, of which the playing field at the moment is located in Maarland. Its name is "Oranje Boys" ("Orange Boys", not to be confounded with "Orange", which is the popular name of the Duch national team, that by the way also mostly plays in orange shirts).

Furthermore, there's a common fanfare, a common carnival society and a common church chorus.

=== Folkloristic events around the civic guard ===
Every two years the civic guard organises the so-called Vogelschieten (Bird-shooting), a contest in which is decided who will be the next shooting-king. He who shoots the very last part of a wooden bird from the high mast it was mounted on, obtains that title for the next two years and has the right to decide who will be 'his' queen during this period. On the same date in the next year there's a celebration in honor of the shooting-king.

=== Folkloristic "Goose beheading" in Maarland ===
In the 1980s the hamlet of Maarland was repeatedly in the news with the folkloristic event "Gansslaan" (goose beheading) that was held annually on a feast day. At this event, blindfolds alternately tried to slap the head of an upside-down dead goose with a saber, which was complicated by the application of a thick iron wire in the animal's neck. Although this was no longer a living goose, as was originally the case, around 1985 no municipal license was granted any more for this somewhat barbaric popular entertainment, in which the dead blood spurted around. The appeals procedure of local residents to get the refusal of a license undone was rejected by the highest national administrative judge. Since then, the event has been replaced by another with a fake goose being thrown.

== Economy ==
Agriculture for a long time has been and partly still is one of the main economical activities in Oost and Maarland, that both have relatively vast outlying areas; in particular:

- Fruit growing (apples, pears, prunes, cherries, strawberries); (also offering fruit picking jobs).
- Tillage (wheat, barley, corn, potatoes, sugar beets)
- Cattle farming (milk cows, chickens, pigs)

Apart from that for a long time jobs in industry and provision of services in nearby bigger places have been and still are bringing employment.

Furthermore, since a number of farms have lost (a considerable part of) their agricultural grounds due to several causes, such as extraction of grit in the river area and industrial as well as housing projects, most of them have been rebuilt thus, that in former business buildings like stables now touristic apartments are rented out.

== Nature ==
A big part of the former fruit-tree area in Oost has been destroyed in the extraction of grit, which was abundantly present in the soil near the river. By now there's a lot of water around there, some water-recreation and some wild nature: a reservation called "Eijsder beemden" ("Eijsden meadows"), which in fact are the "Oost meadows".

== Environment ==
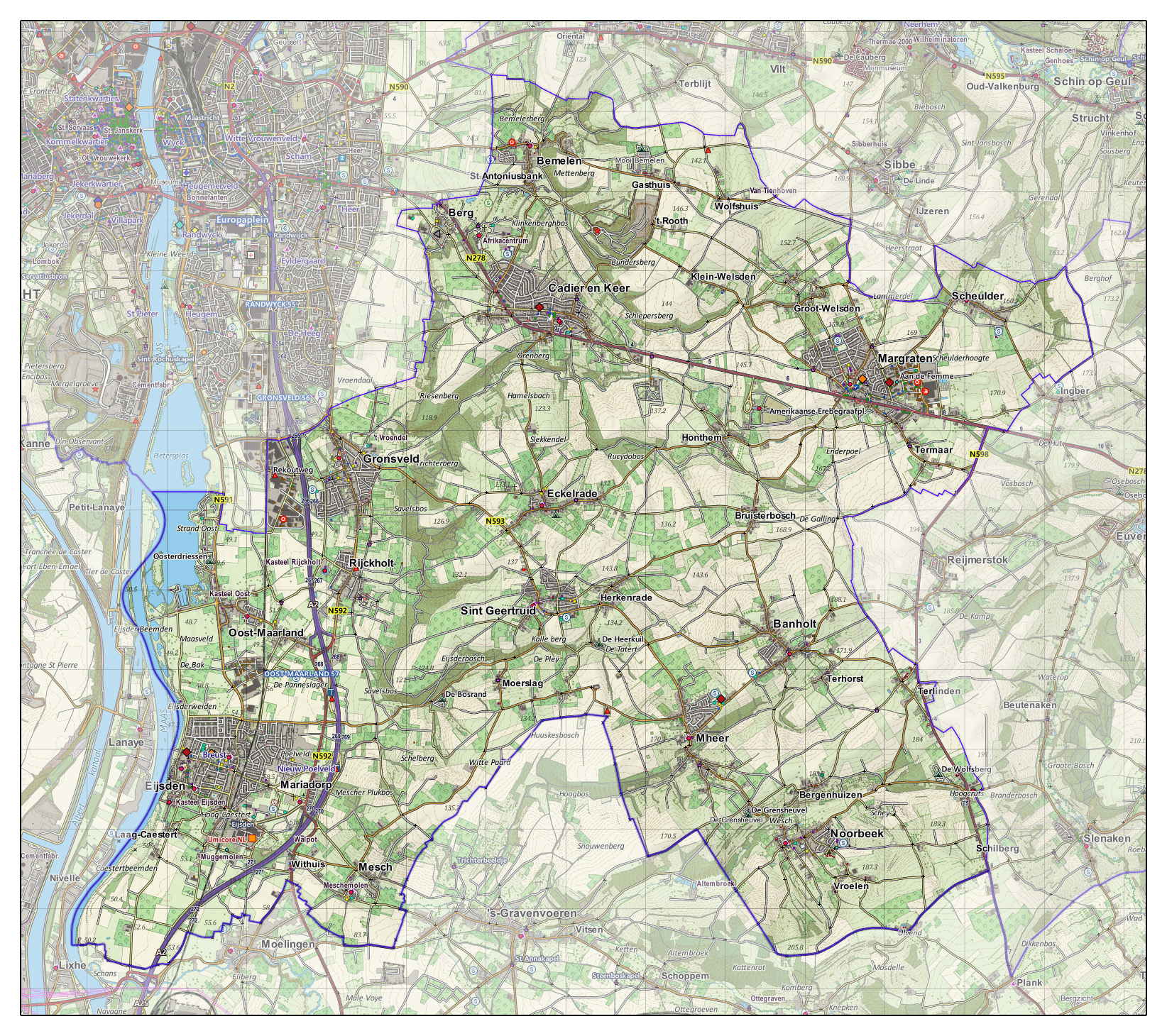
Map Eijsden-Margraten. (Oost-Maarland on the left, near the dark blue water; (best visible after three clicks on map))

- An environmental problem for Oost is in the fact that the Meuse river water is contaminated considerably in especially upstream Belgium, where not only industries dispose of waste water, but also unpurified sewerages are drained into this river.
- For Maarland there's the problem that the E25 highway that passes nearby brings a lot of noise and air pollution. Moreover, the fact that one or more farms there have specialised in pig breeding results in smell pollution for all of the neighbourhood.

== People ==
- Jef Pleumeekers (Politics / former mayor of Heerlen and former member of Senate); originating from Oost.
- Frank Wassenberg (Politics / member House of Representatives); grown up in Oost.

== See also ==
- Oost
