= Wil Roebroeks =

Dutch archaeologist (born 1955)

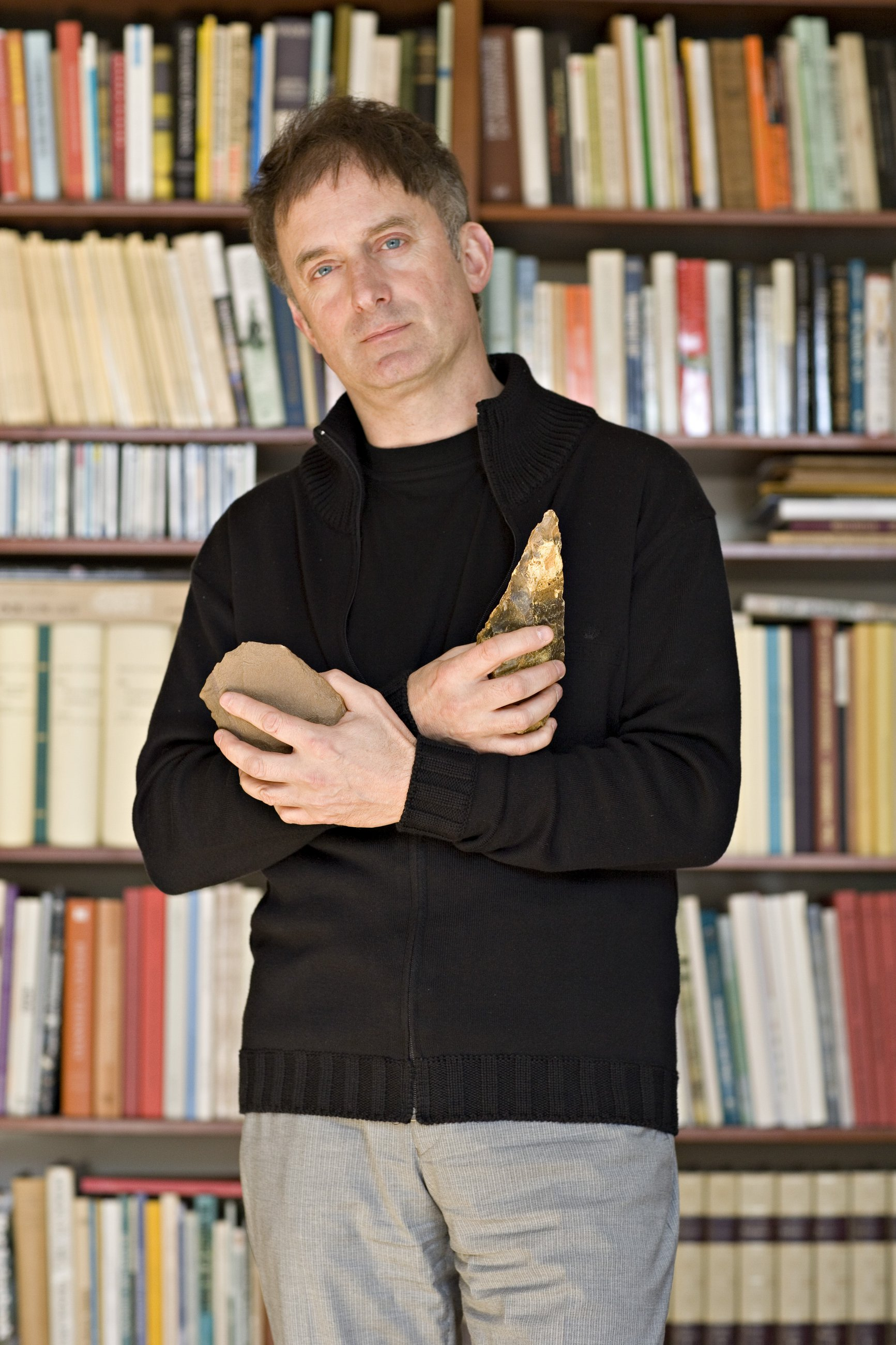
- Roebroeks (2007)
- Born: 5 May 1955 (age 71); Sint Geertruid
- Citizenship: Netherlands
- Education: Radboud University Nijmegen; Leiden University
- Awards: Spinozapremie (2007); Eureka! prijs (1991)
- Scientific career
- Fields: Archaeology, Human evolution
- Workplaces: Leiden University

Wil Roebroeks (born 5 May 1955) is the professor of Palaeolithic Archaeology at Leiden University in the Netherlands. He is widely considered to be the pre-eminent Dutch archaeologist. In 2001 he became a member of the influential Royal Netherlands Academy of Arts and Sciences. In 2007 Roebroeks won the Spinozapremie, the most prestigious scientific award in the Netherlands.

== Career ==
Wil Roebroeks was born on 5 May 1955 in Sint Geertruid. He began his academic career as a history student at the Radboud University Nijmegen where he graduated cum laude in 1979. He then studied prehistory at Leiden University, graduating in 1982. In 1989 he obtained his PhD from the same university, again graduating cum laude. In 1991 he won the Eureka! prijs award for his popular science work Oermensen in Nederland. In 1996 he became a professor at Leiden University.

In 2005 Roebroeks achieved international fame when challenging the Out of Africa theory in Nature. In another article in the same journal Roebroeks published on the discovery of stone tools in Great Britain, older than expected and contradicting the previously held belief that Northern Europe was settled much later than the lands surrounding the Mediterranean Sea.

In 2007 the Nederlandse Organisatie voor Wetenschappelijk Onderzoek awarded Roebroeks the Spinozapremie. The jury report highlighted his various original contributions to the study of human prehistory and called him the most prominent Dutch archaeologist nationally and internationally.

In 2009 Roebroeks again made the international news with his work on Krijn, the first Dutch Neanderthal fossil. This discovery prompted him to argue for the founding of a North-Sea Institute to deal with the archaeological material found in that sea.

In 2012 he published an article about the earliest ochre use of early Neandertals. The discovery was made at the Maastricht-Belvédère archaeological site which has an estimated age of 250.000 BP.

== Publications ==
Roebroeks has published in a number of academic journals including Current Anthropology, Nature and the Journal of Human Evolution. What follows is a selection of his most prominent publications:

- Roebroeks, Wil (1990). Oermensen in Nederland: de archeologie van de oude steentijd [Prehistoric people in the Netherlands: the archeology of the ancient Stone Age] (in Dutch). Meulenhoff. ISBN 978-90-290-9659-1. OCLC 1136158425.
- Roebroeks, Wil; Conard, Nicholas J.; van Kolfschoten, Thijs; Dennell, R. W.; Dunnell, Robert C.; Gamble, Clive; Graves, Paul; Jacobs, Kenneth; Otte, Marcel; Roe, Derek; Svoboda, Jiri; Tuffreau, Alain; Voytek, Barbara A.; Wenban-Smith, Francis; Wymer, J. J. (1 December 1992). "Dense Forests, Cold Steppes, and the Palaeolithic Settlement of Northern Europe [and Comments and Replies]". Current Anthropology. 33 (5): 551–586. doi:10.1086/204113. S2CID 73534499.
- Roebroeks, Wil (1 June 1994). "Updating the Earliest Occupation of Europe". Current Anthropology. 35 (3): 301–305. doi:10.1086/204279. S2CID 144757434.
- Roebroeks, Wil; van Kolfschoten, Thijs (1996). The earliest occupation of Europe. European Science Foundation. ISBN 978-90-73368-06-4. OCLC 610987240.
- Corbey, Raymond; Roebroeks, Wil (2001). Studying Human Origins: Disciplinary History and Epistemology. Amsterdam University Press. ISBN 978-90-5356-464-6.
- Dennell, Robin; Roebroeks, Wil (December 2005). "An Asian perspective on early human dispersal from Africa". Nature. 438 (7071): 1099–1104. Bibcode:2005Natur.438.1099D. doi:10.1038/nature04259. PMID 16371999. S2CID 4405913.
- Roebroeks, Wil (December 2005). "Life on the Costa del Cromer". Nature. 438 (7070): 921–922. Bibcode:2005Natur.438..921R. doi:10.1038/438921a. PMID 16355198. S2CID 4418867.
- Roebroeks, Wil (1 November 2008). "Time for the Middle to Upper Paleolithic transition in Europe". Journal of Human Evolution. 55 (5): 918–926. Bibcode:2008JHumE..55..918R. doi:10.1016/j.jhevol.2008.08.008. PMID 18926558.
- Roebroeks, Wil; Villa, Paola (29 March 2011). "On the earliest evidence for habitual use of fire in Europe". Proceedings of the National Academy of Sciences. 108 (13): 5209–5214. Bibcode:2011PNAS..108.5209R. doi:10.1073/pnas.1018116108. PMC 3069174. PMID 21402905.
- Roebroeks, Wil; Sier, Mark J.; Nielsen, Trine Kellberg; De Loecker, Dimitri; Parés, Josep Maria; Arps, Charles E. S.; Mücher, Herman J. (7 February 2012). "Use of red ochre by early Neandertals". Proceedings of the National Academy of Sciences of the United States of America. 109 (6): 1889–1894. Bibcode:2012PNAS..109.1889R. doi:10.1073/pnas.1112261109. PMC 3277516. PMID 22308348.
- Roebroeks, Wil; Soressi, Marie (7 June 2016). "Neandertals revised". Proceedings of the National Academy of Sciences of the United States of America. 113 (23): 6372–6379. Bibcode:2016PNAS..113.6372R. doi:10.1073/pnas.1521269113. PMC 4988603. PMID 27274044.
