= Giel Haenen =

Dutch footballer (1934–2024)

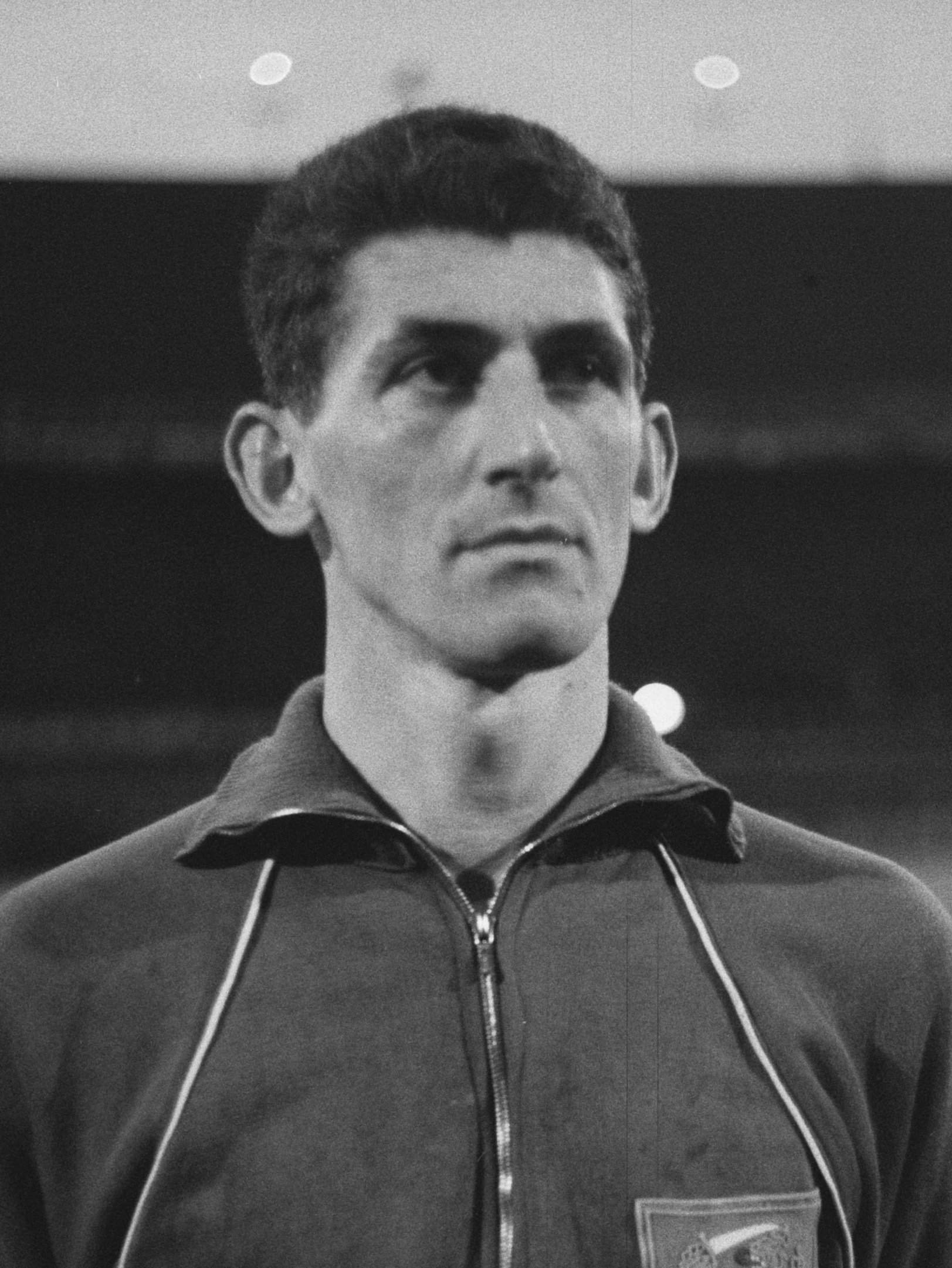
- Haenen in 1964

Personal information
- Full name: Ludovicus Josephus Wilhelmus Haenen
- Date of birth: 2 June 1934
- Place of birth: Eijsden, Netherlands
- Date of death: 30 September 2024 (aged 90)
- Place of death: Maastricht, Netherlands
- Position: Central defender

Youth career
- VV Eijsden
- MVV

Senior career*
Years	Team	Apps	(Gls)
1957–1961	Rapid JC	141	(27)
1961–1966	MVV	138	(15)
1966–1967	Fortuna '54	33	(2)
Total		312	(44)

International career
1964	Netherlands	1	(0)
- * Club domestic league appearances and goals

Ludovicus Josephus Wilhelmus "Giel" Haenen (2 June 1934 – 30 September 2024) was a Dutch footballer who played as a central defender. He made one appearance for the Netherlands national team in 1964.

A tough central defender, Haenen only played for Eredivisie clubs in Limburg after he had left his local amateur side VV Eijsden for MVV. He also coached regional clubs RIOS’31, Caesar, Heer and RKHSV.

Haenen died on 30 September 2024, at the age of 90.
