= Krijn =

Hominin fossil

Coordinates: 51.6803°N 3.3528°E

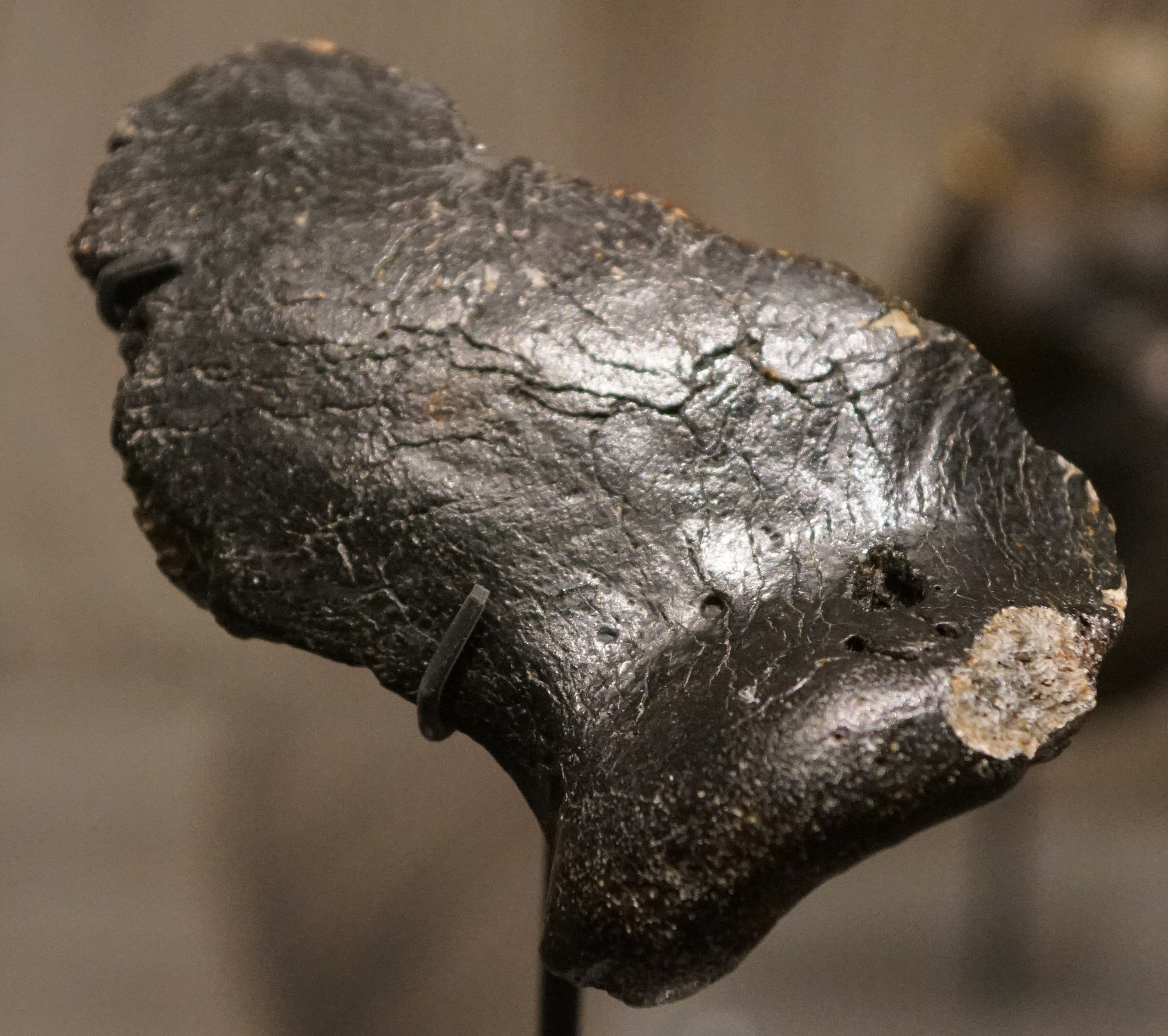
- Common name: Krijn
- Species: Homo neanderthalensis
- Age: 100,000-40,000 BP
- Place discovered: North Sea, Netherlands
- Date discovered: 2009
- Discovered by: Luc Anthonis

Krijn (Dutch pronunciation: [krɛin]) is the common name of a Neanderthal fossil discovered off the Dutch coast. The discovery is most notable for being the first evidence of a Neanderthal presence in the Netherlands. The fossil is estimated at 100,000-40,000 BP. The skull fragment was recovered from the North Sea in 2001 off the coast of Zeelandic Flanders (province of Zeeland). It was first publicly described in 2009.

== Publication ==
The fossil was made public by Ronald Plasterk, the Minister of Education, Culture and Science at a press conference held in the Dutch National Museum of Antiquities in Leiden. The fragment is currently the center piece of a special exhibition in the same museum. The Natural History Museum in London and Boerhaave Museum in Leiden also pay attention to the discovery.

The scientific analysis of the skull fragment was published in the Journal of Human Evolution.

== Analysis ==
The fossil is a skull fragment. It was studied by a team from the Max Planck Institute for Evolutionary Anthropology and Leiden University.

The shape of the orbital bone reveals that the piece belonged to a male Neanderthal. A cavity in the bone was the result of a benign tumor probably carried from birth. The bone structure showed that he had not yet fully matured. Radiocarbon dating and genetic testing proved impossible due to poor preservation, but an isotope analysis demonstrated that the young man had a diet consisting mostly of meat. This result is consistent with what was previously known of the Neanderthal diet.

== Importance ==
The discovery marked both the first Dutch Neanderthal fossil, and the oldest human fossil discovered under water. Wil Roebroeks, an archaeologist at Leiden University, commented that the find may convince Dutch and British authorities to better protect the archaeological archive in the North Sea. Other scientists echoed this wish. The fragment further provides a piece of the puzzle in the settlement history of Great Britain, adding weight to the theory that the region was recolonised from the current continent after a period of 100,000 years without human presence.

== See also ==
- List of human evolution fossils
