= Sint Geertruid =

Sint Geertruid Se-Gietere
- Village
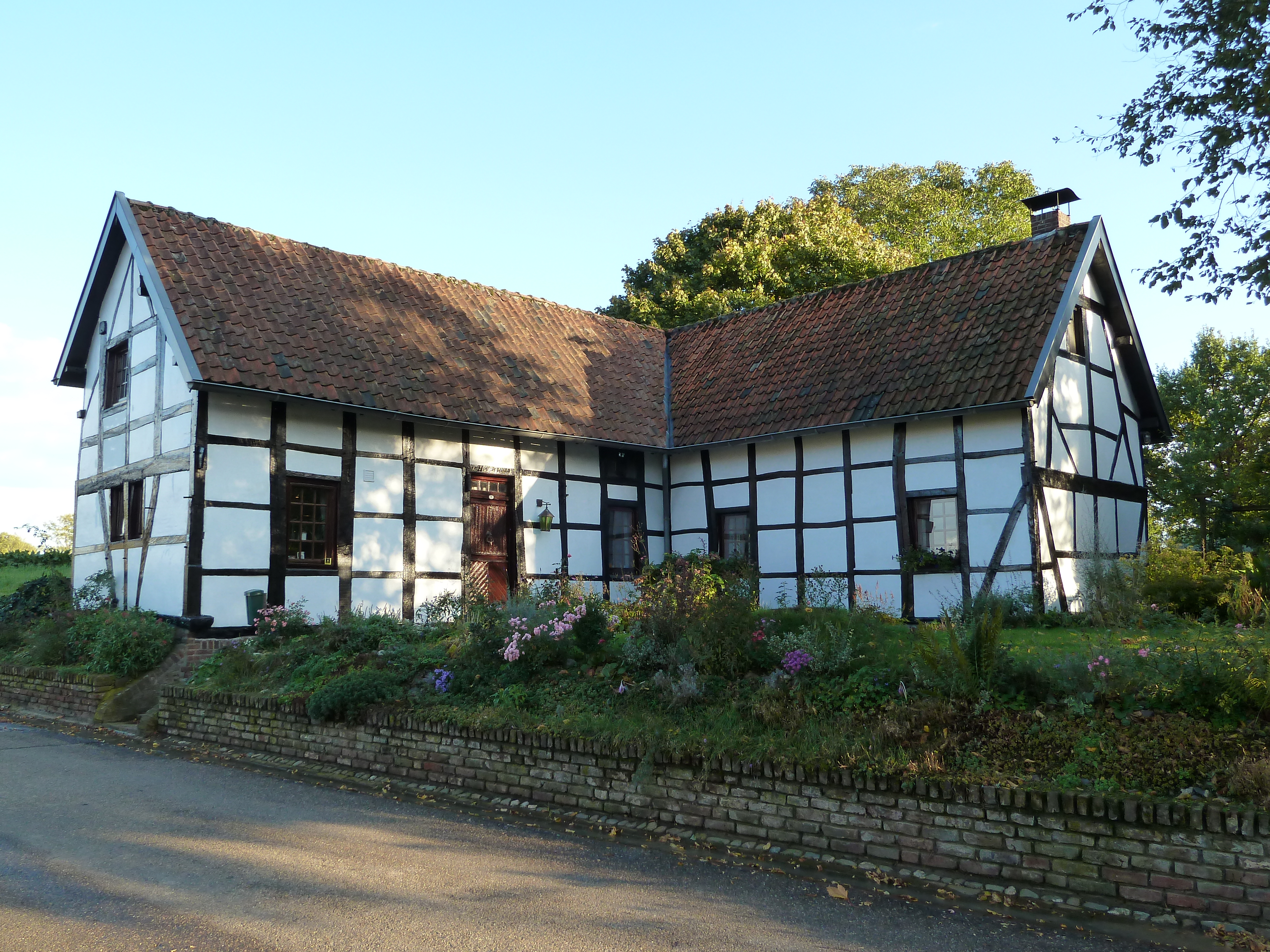
- Half timbered house at Libeek

- Location in the Netherlands Location in the province of Limburg in the Netherlands
- Coordinates: 50°47′47″N 5°45′56″E
- Country: Netherlands
- Province: Limburg (Netherlands)
- Municipality: Eijsden-Margraten

Area
  - Total: 0.49 km^{2} (0.19 sq mi)
- Elevation: 138 m (453 ft)

Population (2021)
  - Total: 960
  - Density: 2,000/km^{2} (5,100/sq mi)
- Time zone: UTC+1 (CET)
  - Summer (DST): UTC+2 (CEST)
- Postal code: 6265
- Dialing code: 043

Sint Geertruid (Limburgish: Se-Gietere) is a village in the Dutch province of Limburg. It is located the municipality of Eijsden-Margraten.

== History ==
The village was first mentioned in 1178 as "in monte". The current name is reference to Gertrude of Nivelles. In the middle of the 13th an outpost of the Cistercian monastery Hocht was founded and the area was cultivated. Sint Geertruid became a parish in 1222.

The Catholic St Gertrudis Church is a three-aisled church with 11th century elements. The chalk stone tower was built around 1300. It was modified and extended several times throughout its history and restored between 1956 and 1957.

Sint Geertruid was home to 271 people in 1840. It was a separate municipality until 1982, when it was merged with Margraten. The municipality was formed in 1828 from parts of the municipalities of Breust and Eijsden. In 2011, it became part of the municipality of Eijsden-Margraten.

Part of the Sint Geertruid population centre in the Eijsden-Margraten municipality are also the separately situated townships of: Bruisterbosch, Herkenrade, Libeek and Moerslag.

A significant part of the "Savelsbos" hill side forest is situated in the outlying area of Sint Geertruid.

== Gallery ==
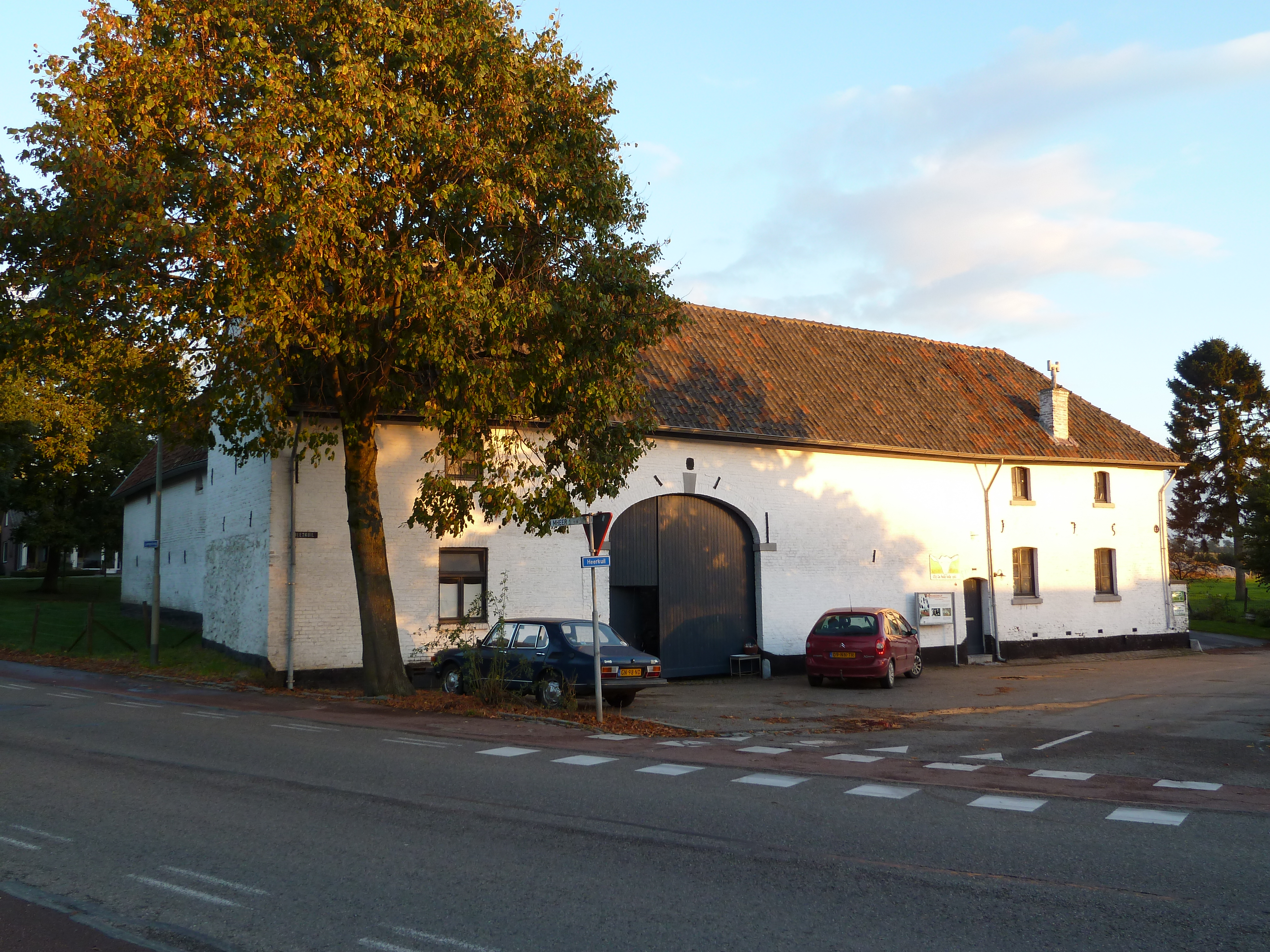
Sint Geertruid-Heerkuil

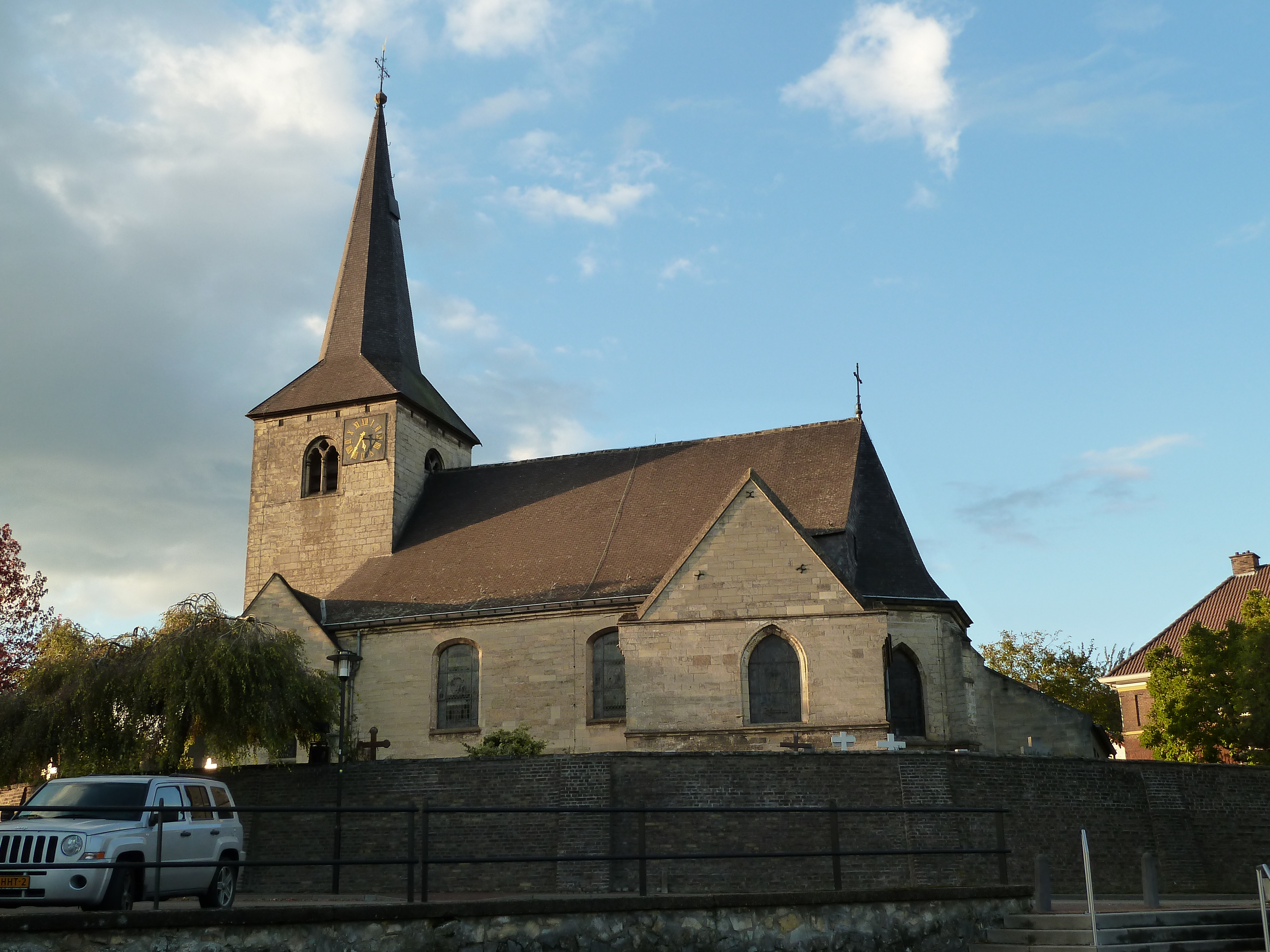
St Gertrudis Church

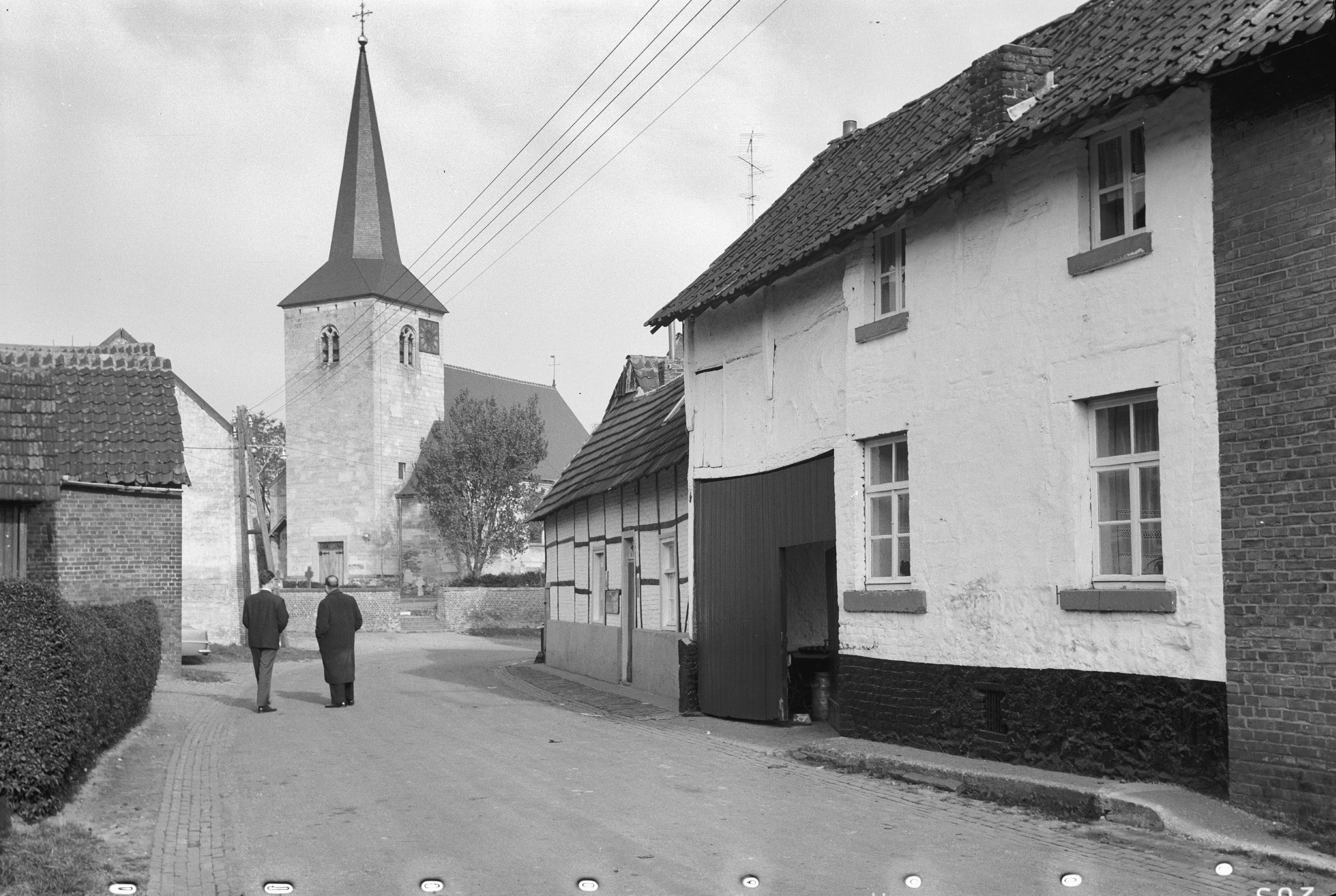
Village view back in 1962

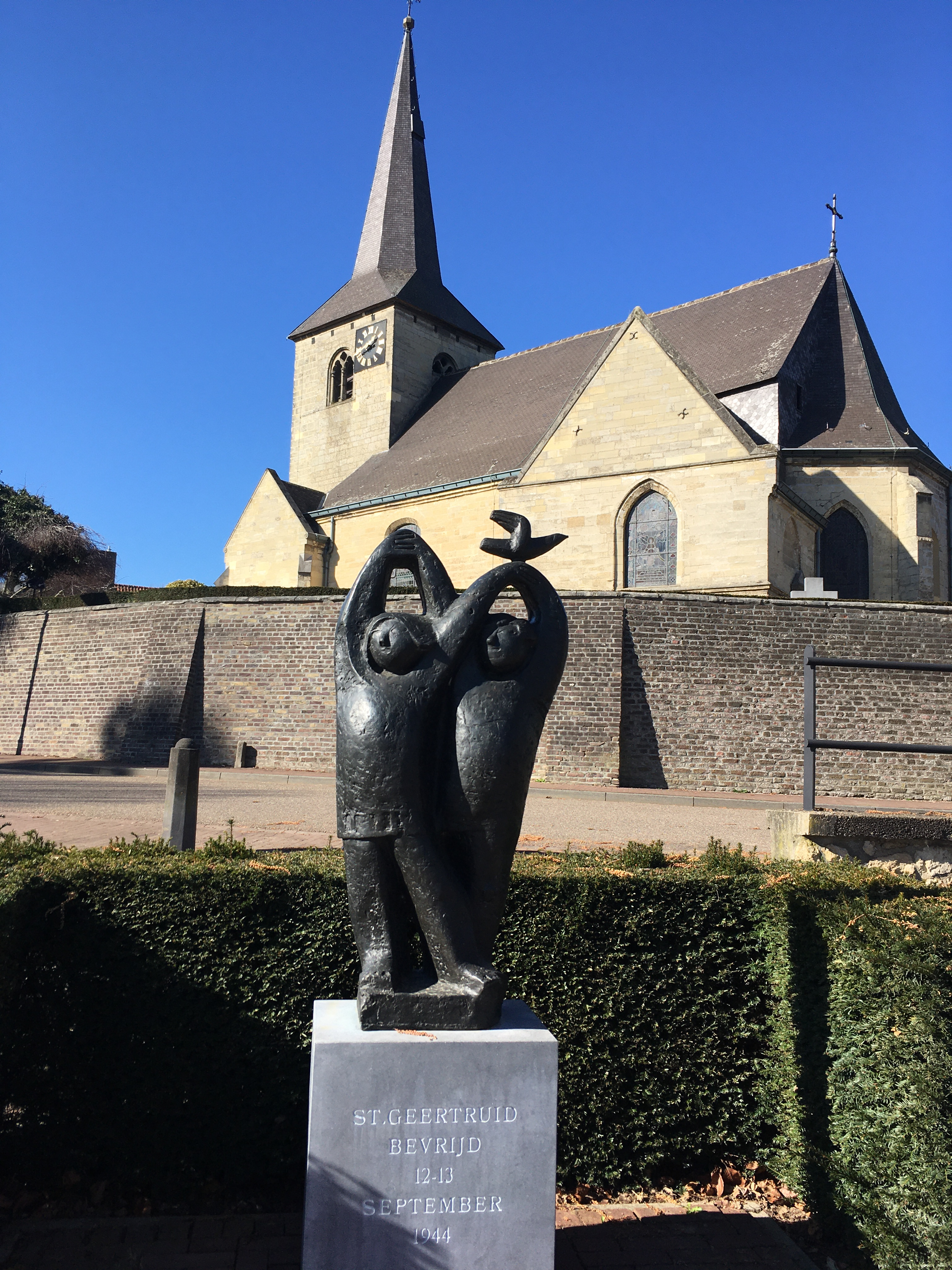
Liberation monument
