= Augusta of Treviso =

Roman Catholic Saint

Saint Augusta of Treviso
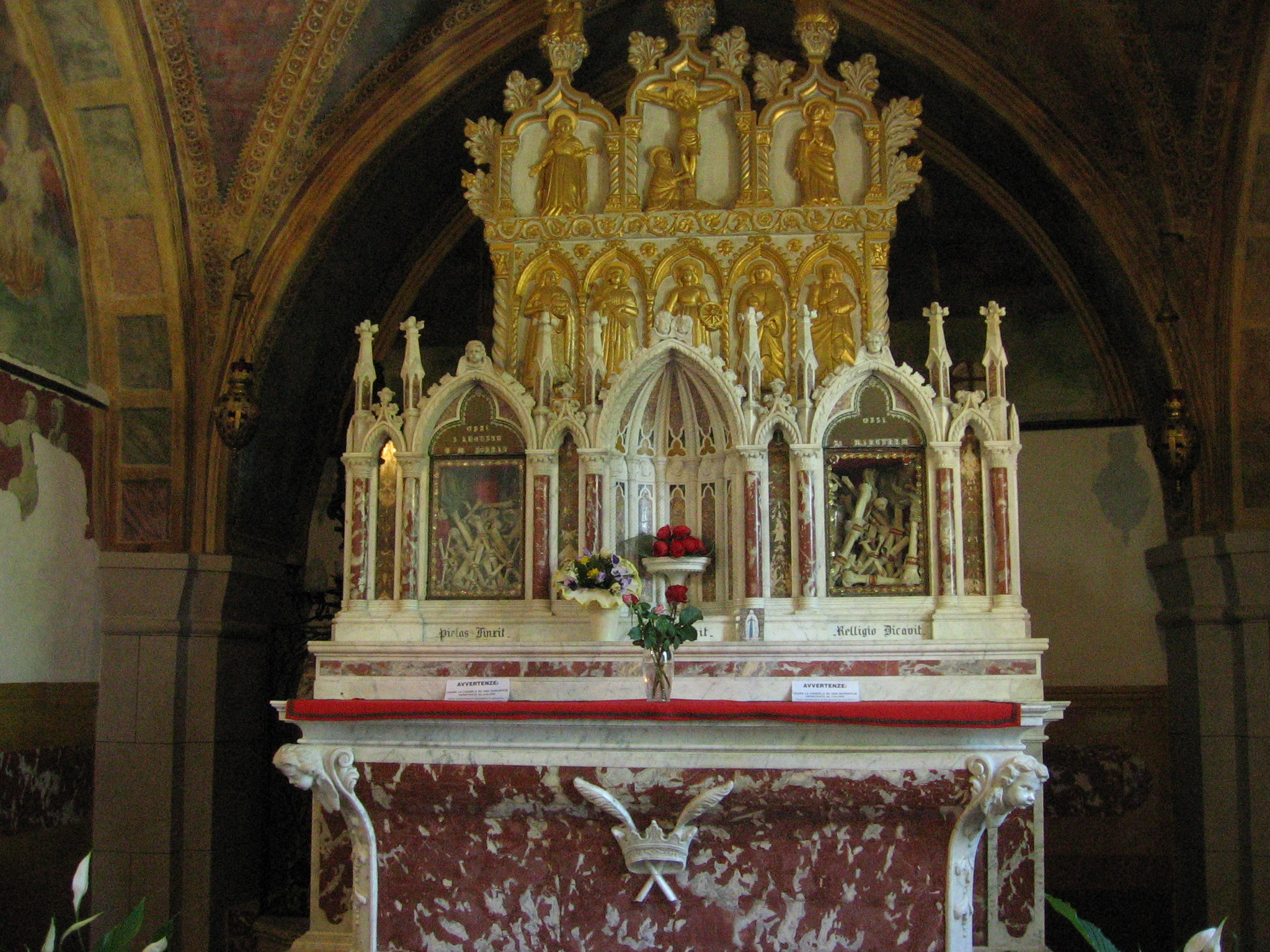
- The relics of Saint Augusta. Sanctuary of Santa Augusta, Vittorio Veneto, Italy.

Martyr
- Died: ~5th Century; Serravalle, Vittorio Veneto, Italy
- Venerated in: Roman Catholic Church; Orthodox Church
- Major shrine: Sanctuary of Santa Augusta, Serravalle, Vittorio Veneto.
- Feast: 27 March; 1 August (translation of relics); 22 August (discovery of relics)
- Attributes: Sword; funeral pyre; wheel; depicted with her father, in the act of her father killing her
- Patronage: Ceneda, Italy

Saint Augusta of Treviso, also known as Augusta of Ceneda, Augusta of Tarvisium, or Augusta of Serravalle, is venerated as a virgin martyr.

== Background ==
Her Acts were written in the 16th century by Minuccio Minucci di Serravalle, who was secretary to Pope Clement VIII and Protonotary apostolic. According to her legendary Acts, Augusta was the daughter of Matrucus, pagan chief of the Alemanni. Matrucus had conquered the Friulians, who had been Christianized, and ruled over them.

Augusta converted to Christianity secretly. Her father had sent spies to watch over her, and one day, when he discovered her praying, he imprisoned her, and then knocked out all of her teeth. Her enraged father then tortured and decapitated her with his sword at Serravalle, a district of the present-day Vittorio Veneto, around 100 AD. Some sources state that her death took place in the 5th century.

== Veneration ==
De' Minucci's Acts were included in a volume entitled De probatis sanctorum historiis, a hagiographic study by the 16th century German scholar Laurentius Surius (Lorenz Sauer, Laurence Suhr, Lorenzo Surio), and were published at Cologne. Her name is listed in Ferrarius’ Catalogue of Saints, but not in the Roman Martyrology. 1 August was the day in which the translation of her relics was celebrated, and 22 August the invention (discovery) of her relics, but the main feast day is 27 March.

Augusta's relics are said to have been found a few years after her death on the hill called Santa Augusta after her, which overlooks Serravalle. A church dedicated to her was built in the 5th century.

== Gallery ==
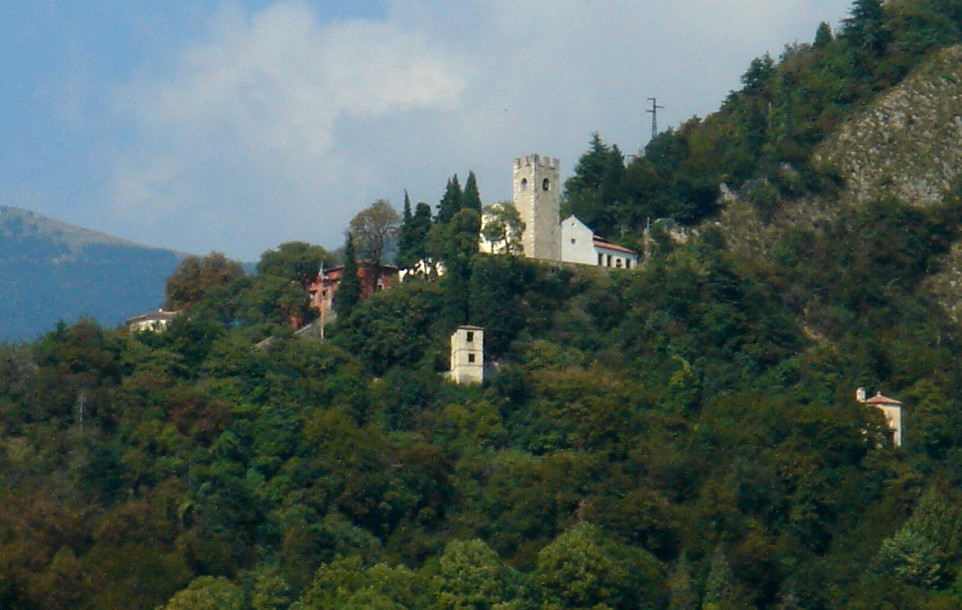
The hill where Augusta's relics are said to have been found.
