= Eijsden =

Village in the Dutch province of Limburg

Eijsden Èèsjde (Limburgish)
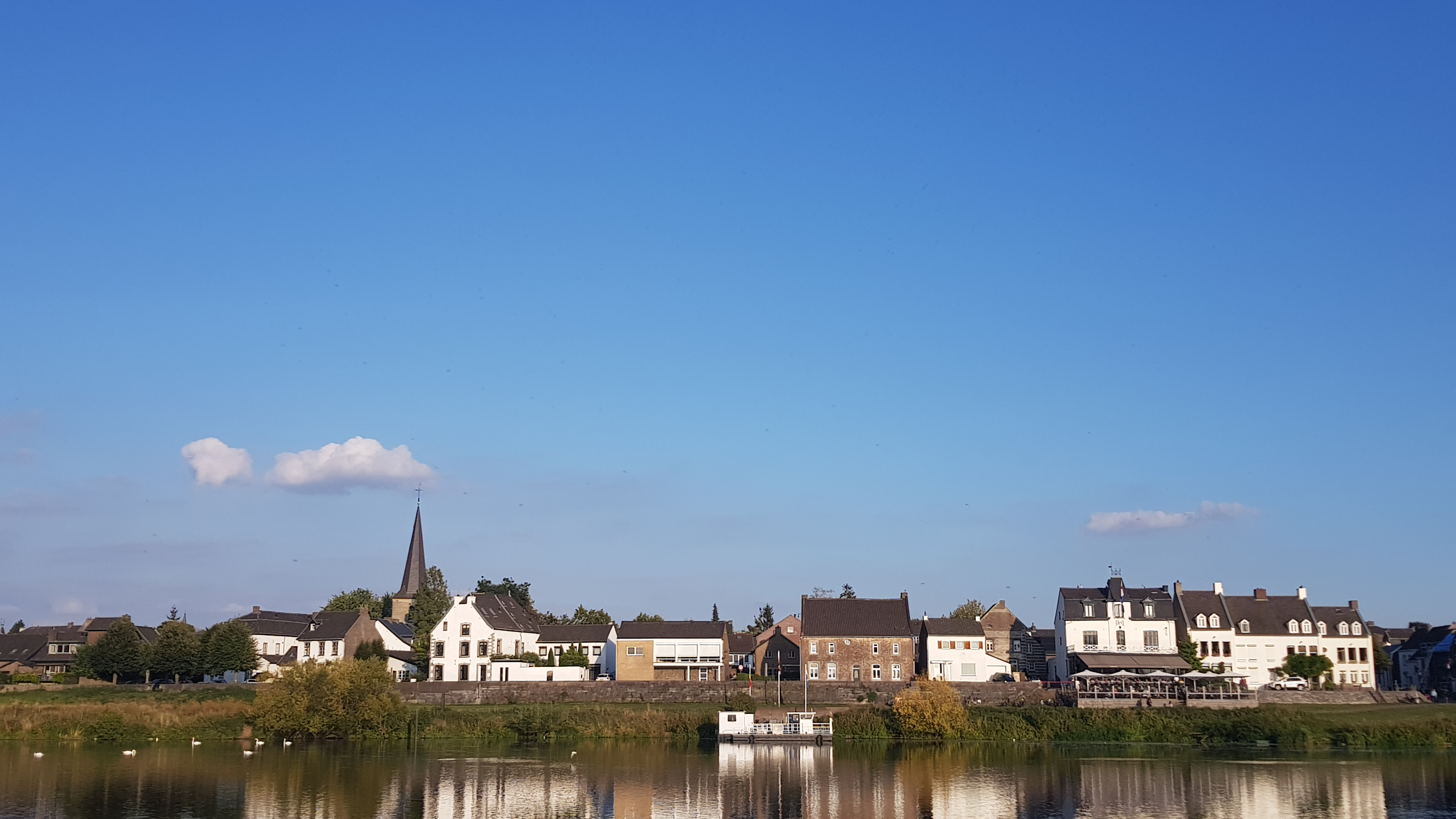
- Eijsden viewed from Lanaye across the Meuse

- Flag Coat of arms

- Location in the Netherlands Location in the province of Limburg in the Netherlands
- Coordinates: 50°46′40″N 5°42′30″E
- Country: Netherlands
- Province: Limburg (Netherlands)
- Municipality: Eijsden-Margraten

Area
  - Total: 3.69 km^{2} (1.42 sq mi)
- Elevation: 56 m (184 ft)

Population (2021)
  - Total: 4,255
  - Density: 1,150/km^{2} (2,990/sq mi)
- Time zone: UTC+1 (CET)
  - Summer (DST): UTC+2 (CEST)
- Postal code: 6245
- Dialing code: 043

Eijsden (Dutch pronunciation: [ˈɛizdə(n)]; Limburgish: Èèsjde [ˈɛːʒdə]) is a village situated in the far south of the Netherlands. It is located in the southwestern part of the province of Limburg.

Until 1 January 2011, Eijsden was the main village in a municipality of the same name. On that date this municipality merged with neighbouring Margraten, forming the current municipality of Eijsden-Margraten, in which Eijsden is still the largest settlement.

This village is one of the most southerly places in the Netherlands, extending down to the most southerly part of the border between the Netherlands and Belgium.

It is at Eijsden that the Meuse river, coming from France and Belgium, flows into the Netherlands, the last country of its course. From here on its name in Dutch is Maas. Running northward to the west of Eijsden west it forms part of the Belgium–Netherlands border. Its Belgian border across the Meuse is Lanaye, a village of Liège Province in Wallonia, whereas its border to the south is the Voerstreek exclave of Limburg province in Flanders.

A smaller stream, the Voer, coming from Belgium, drains into the Meuse river in this place.

== History ==
Eijsden is one of the older places in the country. Its name is supposed to be derived of the Germanic word for aspen forest. Excavations have revealed a Roman settlement. In the Middle Ages, this settlement developed to a village. After the (feudal) Middle Ages, in the seventeenth century Eijsden gained in economic strength because of its position near the Dutch-Belgian frontier on the Meuse river. Its function as a trading and shipping centre attracted settlement of well-to-do merchants from Holland. This period of prosperity ended in the Napoleonic era when, for a time, the area ceased to be a frontier.

=== Former municipality ===
The former Eijsden municipality was composed of several population centres, of which the one named Eijsden was the largest, with 7000 inhabitants. The other population centres (now all part of "Eijsden-Margraten") were:

- Breust
- Hoog- en Laag Caestert
- Gronsveld
- Mariadorp
- Mesch
- Oost-Maarland
- Rijckholt
- Withuis

== Constituting quarters ==
Nowadays the administrative population centre of Eijsden in the municipality of Eijsden-Margraten is formed by several neighbourhoods of which most are more or less separately situated and have their own history:

- Breust, the most northern part of the place, is a former municipality of its own, now forming one quarter with Eijsden itself and including several newbuilt neighbourhoods.
- Eijsden itself.
- Mariadorp, situated to the east of Eijsden itself.
- Laag-Caestert, together with Hoog-Caestert and Withuis forming the southern part of the place.
- Hoog-Caestert, situated to the east of Laag-Caestert.
- Withuis, situated to the east of Hoog-Caestert. In fact this is only the northerly part of the relevant township; the other part is situated across the frontier in Belgium.

== Economy ==
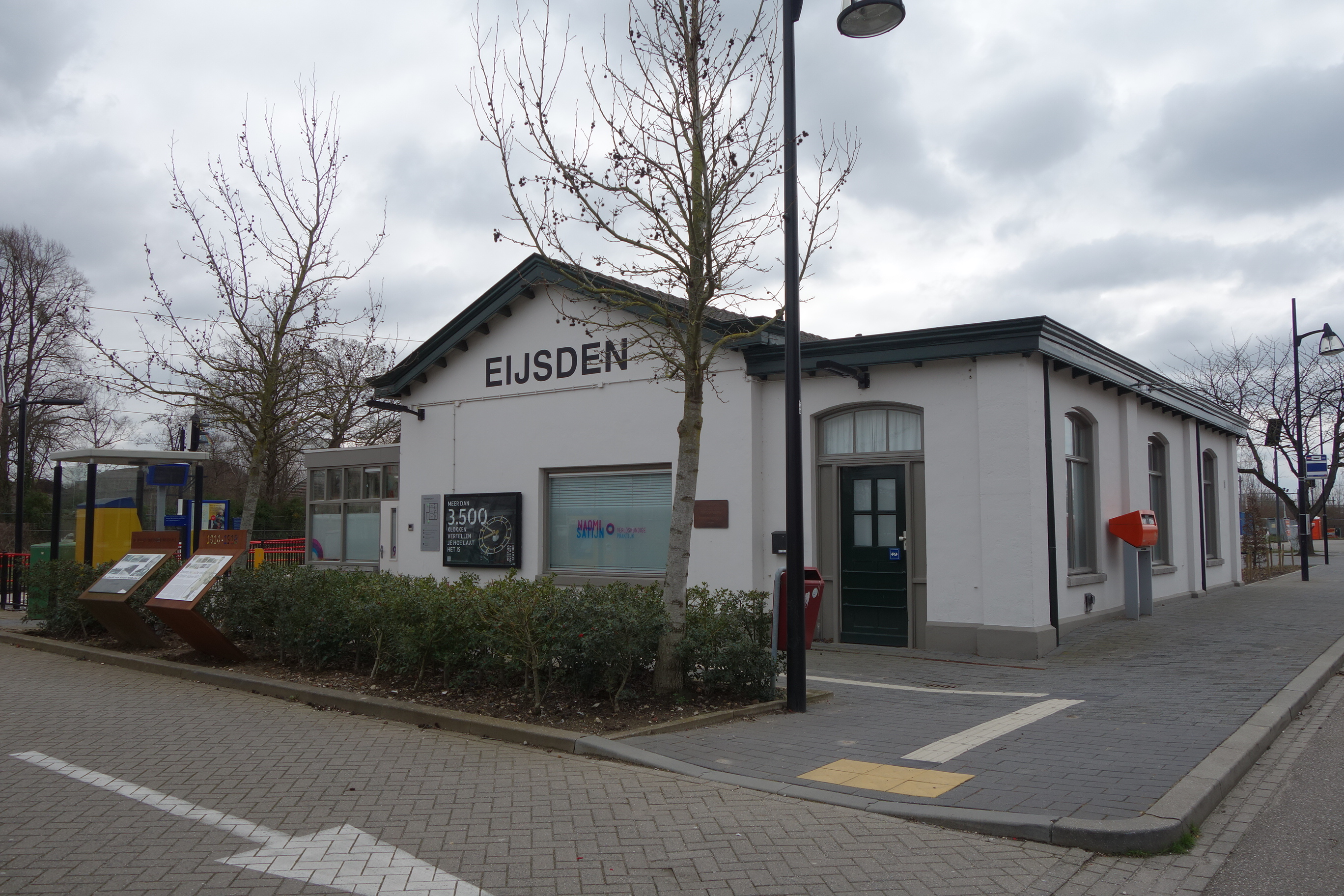
Eijsden railway station

Apart from trading and shipping, the Eijsden economy traditionally has had an agricultural character, with a focus on fruit growing. At one time, in Eijsden the Netherlands' largest local fruit tree area was situated. In the second half of the 20th century, many orchards were replaced by housing, dairy farming and industry.

In 1870, a zinc white factory brought industrial activity to the municipality, along with jobs and air pollution. The number of jobs originally was about 700; by now some 300 are left.

As a result of the relatively vast housing projects in the northern part, Eijsden nowadays is largely residential.

The village is served by Eijsden railway station on the Liège–Maastricht line, which is only served by NMBS/SNCB trains and is the southernmost railway station in the Netherlands.

== Sights ==
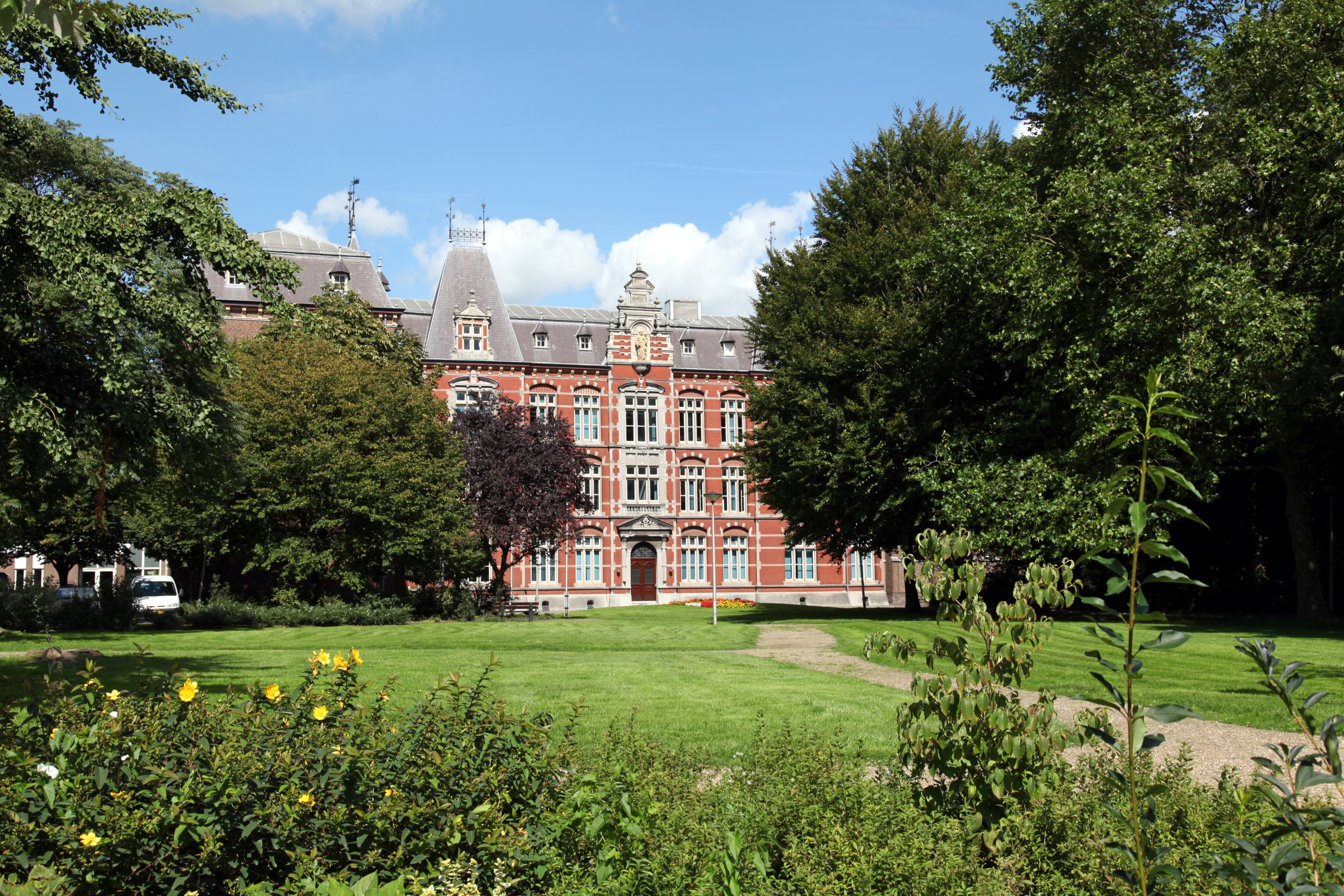
Former monastery at Breust Eijsden

- The seventeenth century Renaissance style castle of Eijsden (according to the relevant Unesco-list) is one of the top hundred buildings in the country.
- A stylish former monastery, nowadays housing Museum het Ursulinenconvent - International Museum for Family History.
- The historical "Vroenhof" central square.
- Four monumental water mills on the Voer river.
- Two centuries old church buildings.

== Music ==
In the municipality of Eijsden two military bands are based, 'the blue' and 'the red', of which the former in competition contests competes in the second highest international division and the latter in the highest.

In 2009 and 2013, the 'red', the Koninklijke Harmonie Sainte Cécile, was the winner in the World Concert Division of the four-yearly World Music Contest, a competition for professional, amateur and military bands, held in Kerkrade.

The 'blue', the "Koninklijke Oude Harmonie Sainte Cécile", finished second in the First Concert Division.

== Famous natives of Eijsden ==
- Jo Bonfrère, footballer
- Eugène Dubois, anatomist/anthropologist
- Giel Haenen, international footballer
- Jo Maas, cyclist, stage winner and seventh in end-classification of 1978 Tour de France
- Jacques Vriends, children's books writer

== Gallery ==
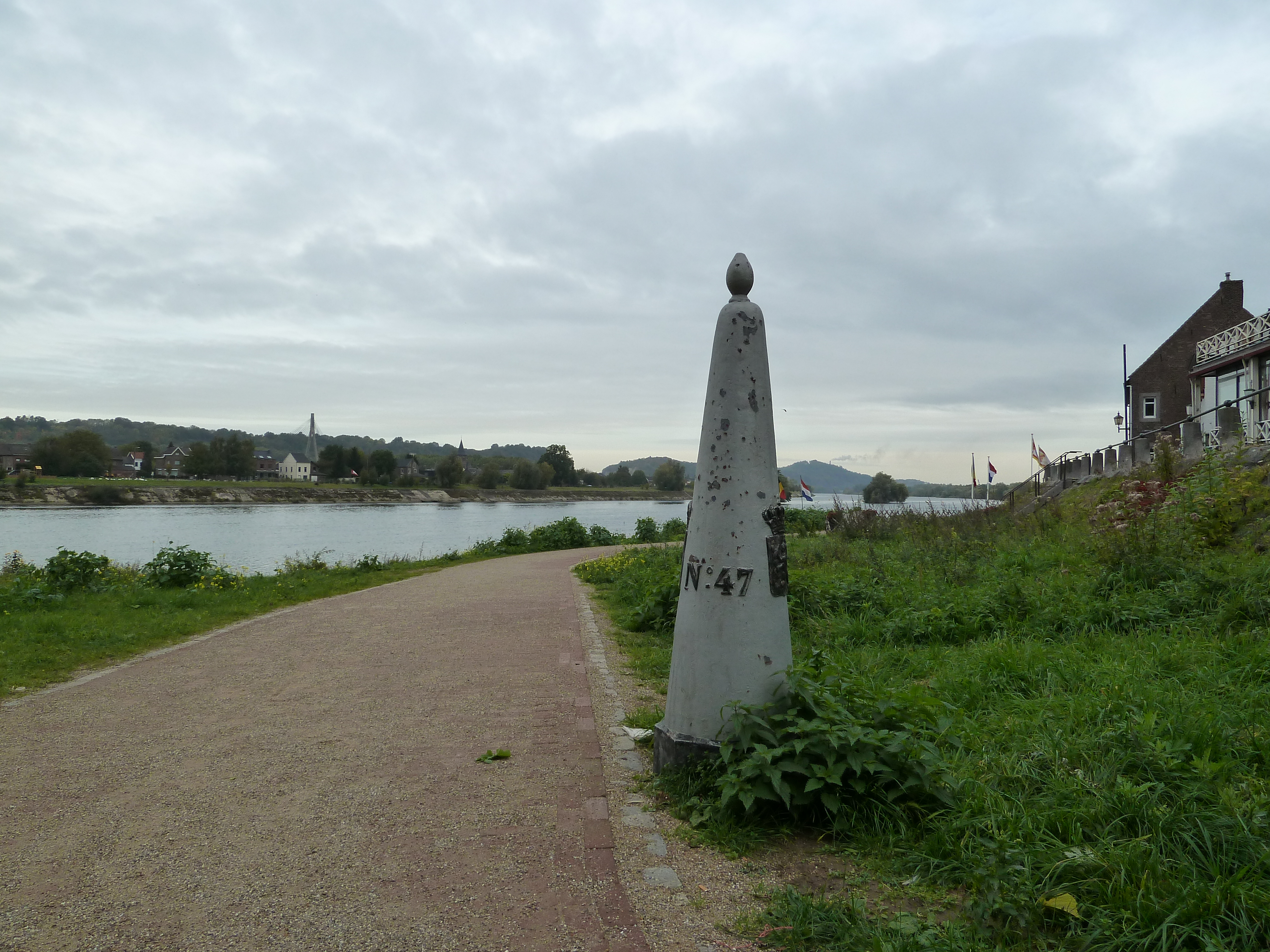
Meuse river enters the Netherlands at Eijsden

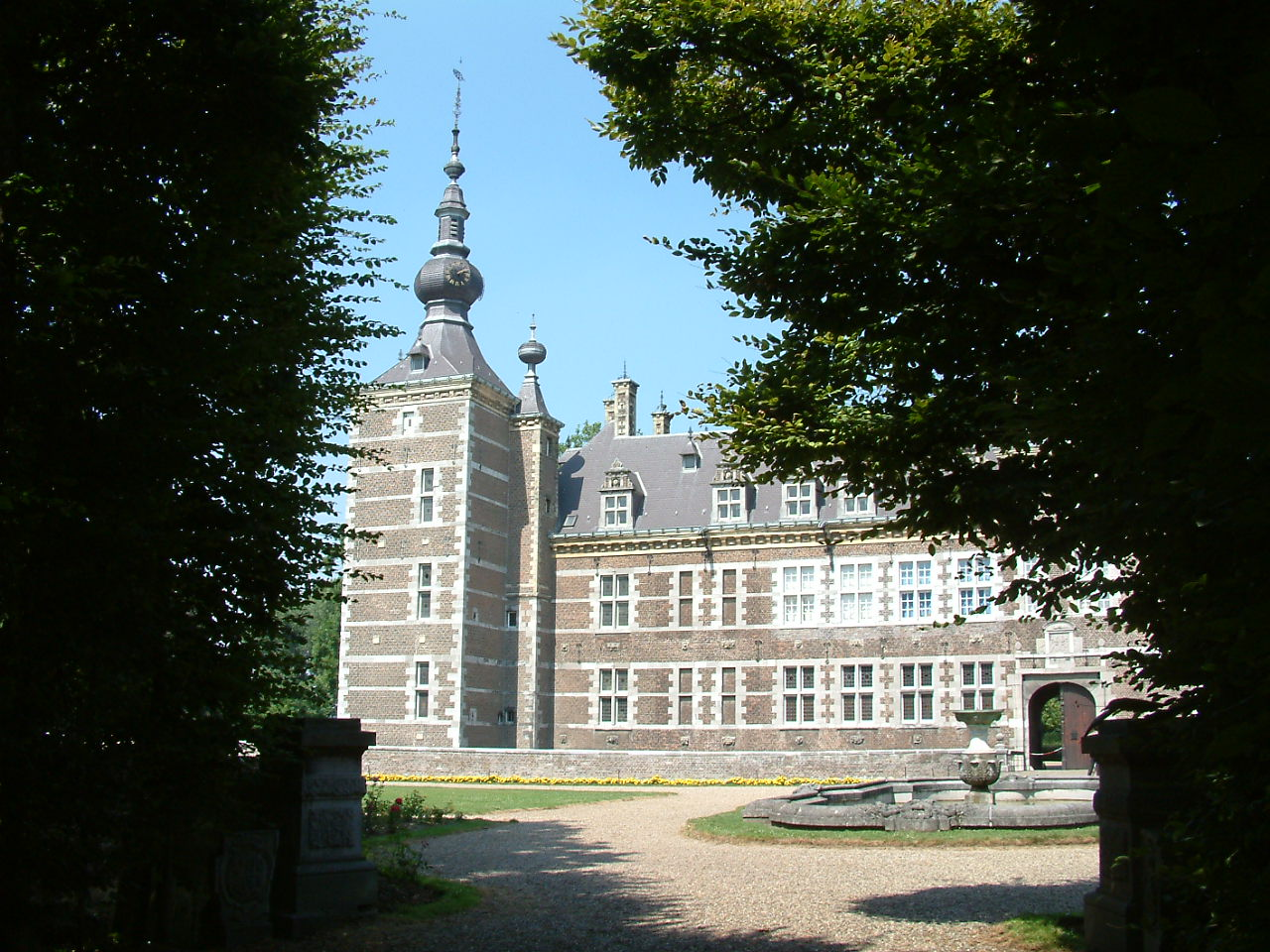
Eijsden's 17th-century castle at Laag-Caestert

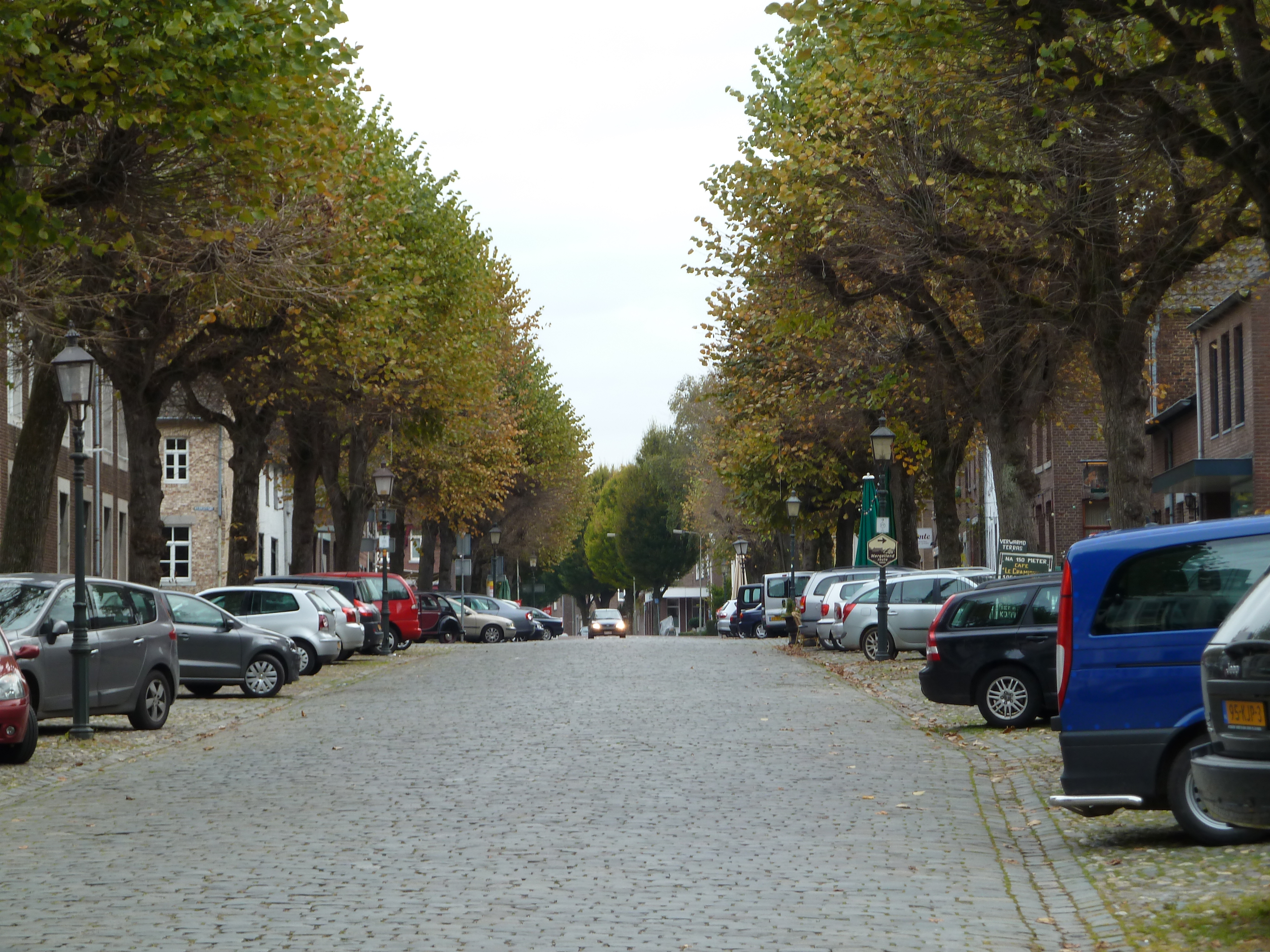
View of a historical street, the Diepstraat, that (downwards) leads to the river bank
