= Breust =

Breust Breusj
- Neighbourhood
- Interactive map of Breust
- Coordinates: 50°46′49″N 5°43′5″E
- Country: Netherlands
- Province: Limburg
- Municipality: Eijsden-Margraten

Population (2002)
  - Total: 266

Breust is a former village in the Dutch province of Limburg. It is located in the municipality of Eijsden-Margraten, and is now a neighbourhood of Eijsden.

Breust was a separate municipality until 1828, when the area was divided between the municipalities of Eijsden and Sint Geertruid.
