= Nuth =

Nuth Nut (Limburgish)
- Former Municipality
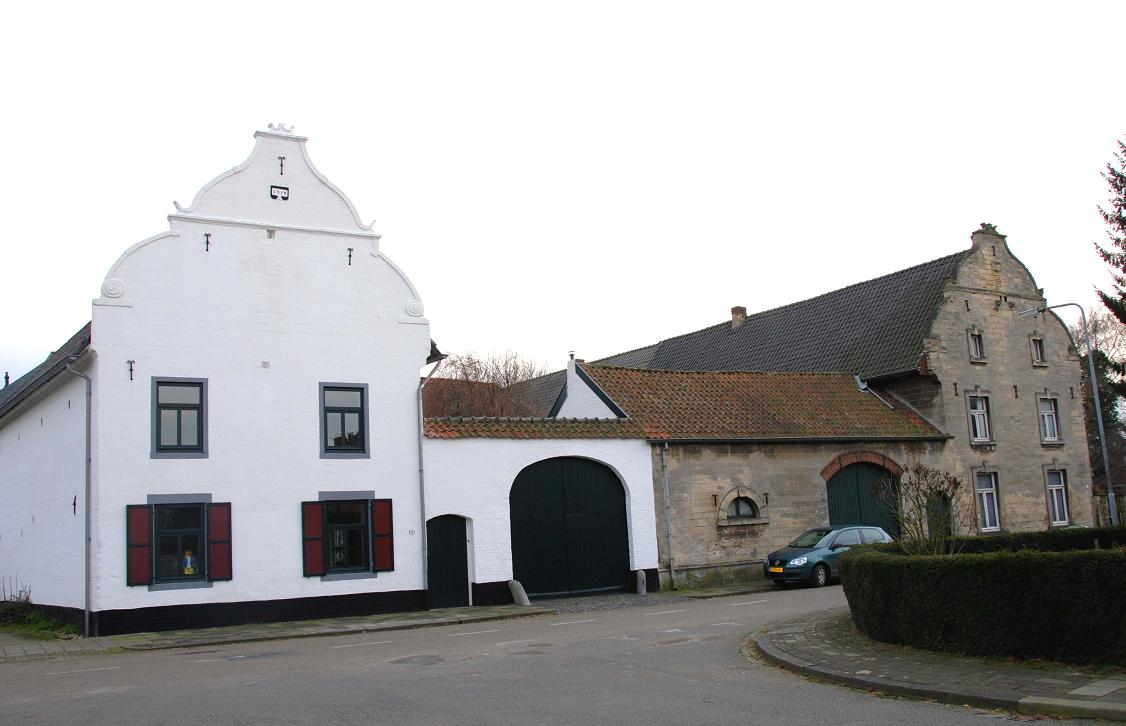
- Old farmhouse in Arensgenhout

- Flag Coat of arms

- Location in the Netherlands Location in the province of Limburg in the Netherlands
- Coordinates: 50°55′N 5°53′E
- Country: Netherlands
- Province: Limburg
- Municipality: Beekdaelen
- Merged: 2019

Area
  - Total: 3.27 km^{2} (1.26 sq mi)
- Elevation: 86 m (282 ft)

Population (2021)
  - Total: 4,595
  - Density: 1,410/km^{2} (3,640/sq mi)
- Demonym: Nutter
- Time zone: UTC+1 (CET)
  - Summer (DST): UTC+2 (CEST)
- Postcode: 6361
- Area code: 045
- Website: www.beekdaelen.nl

Nuth (Dutch: [nʏt]; Limburgish: Nut [nʏt]) is a village and a former municipality in the province of Limburg, situated in the southern Netherlands. In January 2019, the municipality merged with Schinnen and Onderbanken to form Beekdaelen.

The village of Nuth with 4,595 inhabitants (1 January 2021), is the most populous village of the municipality. The town hall of the municipality Nuth was also situated in the village Nuth. The other villages in the municipality were Hulsberg with 3972 inhabitants, Schimmert with 3184, Wijnandsrade with 1623 and Vaesrade with 997 inhabitants (data: 1-1-2021). The other population centres belong to one of the following villages.

== Population centres ==
Aalbeek, Arensgenhout, Grijzegrubben, Helle, Hellebroek, Hulsberg, Laar, Schimmert, Swier, Terstraten, Vaesrade, Wijnandsrade.

=== Topography ===
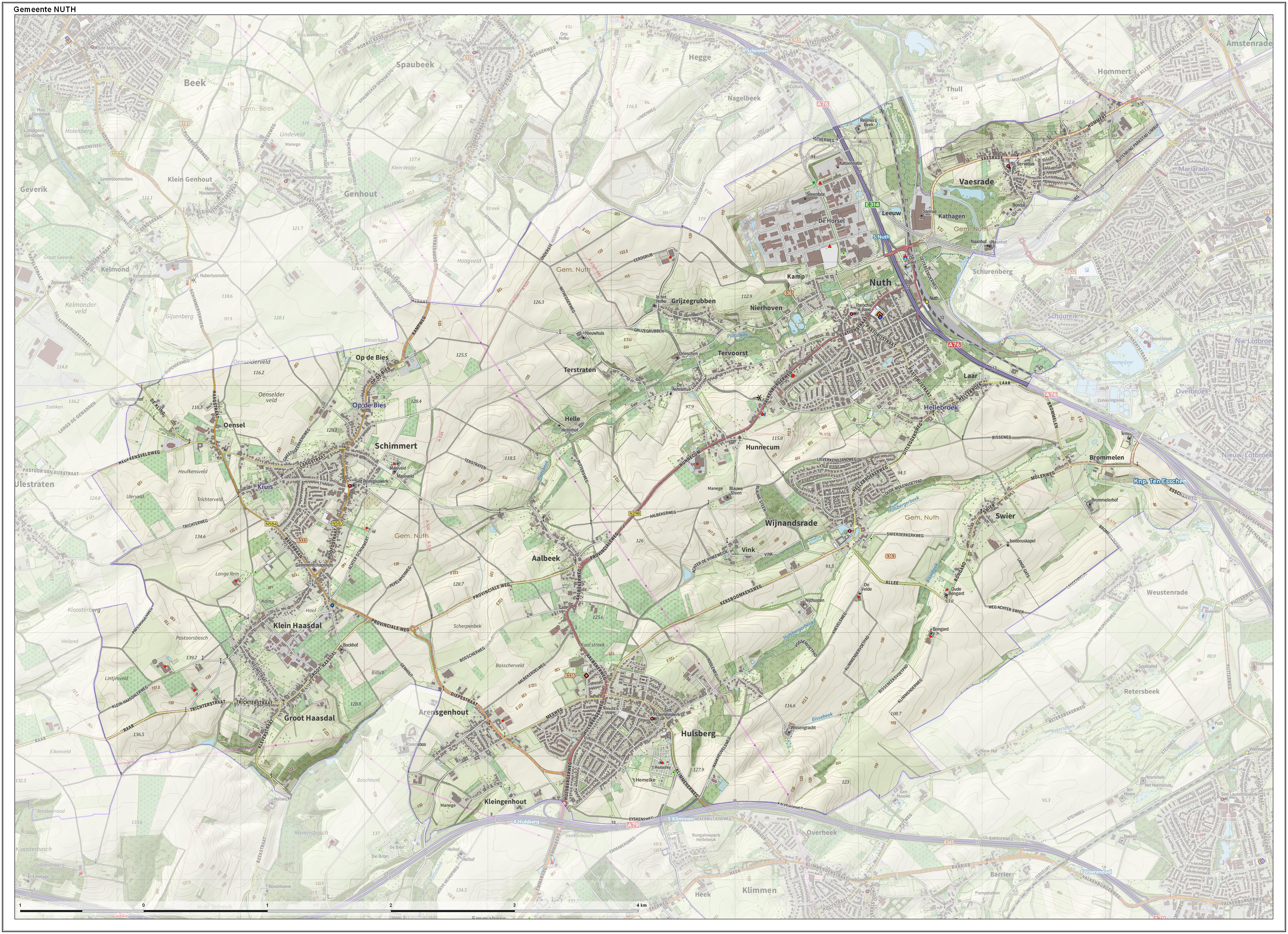

Dutch Topographic map of the municipality of Nuth, June 2015

== Transportation ==
- Railway station: Nuth
- Exit 5 of the A76 Motorway

== Some facts about Nuth ==
- The patron Saint of Nuth is St. Bavo, after which the parish is named.
- The municipality expanded all the way from Hoensbroek to Meerssen.
- From 2004 Nuth boasted a one Michelin star restaurant, In de'n Dillegaard, and Nuth made the international press when the restaurant owner returned the coveted star in 2009 over concerns of being too elitist.

== Notable people ==
- Hubert Bruls, politician, Mayor of Nijmegen (born 1966)
- Hans Coumans, painter (1943–1986)
- Jan Drummen, architect (1891–1966)
- Karel van der Hucht, astronomer (born 1946)
- Auguste Kerckhoffs, linguist and cryptographer (1835–1903)
- Joseph Kerckhoffs, physician (1789–1867)
- Joep Packbiers, archer, Olympic champion (1875–1957)
- Jos Schreurs, Roman Catholic priest and Dutch senator (1934–2022)
- Frans de Wever, general practitioner (1869–1940)
