= Kerckhoff =

Kerckhoff or Kerckhoffs is a Dutch and Low German toponymic surname meaning "church yard" (modern Dutch kerkhof). An ancestor may have lived near or worked in the church yard, or have come from a number of villages and hamlets named Kerkhove or Kerkhoven. Variant forms of the surname are Kerkhof, Kerkhoff(s), Kerkhove(n), and Van (de) Kerkhof(f). Notable people with the surname include:

- Auguste Kerckhoffs (1835–1903), Dutch linguist and cryptographer
  - Kerckhoffs' principle, a cryptographic principle named for him
- Hermann Kerckhoff (1937–2023), Canadian slalom canoeist
- Joseph Kerckhoffs (1789–1867), Dutch physician
- Steven Kerckhoff (born 1952), American mathematician
- Sylvia Kerckhoff (born 1928), American politician from North Carolina
- William G. Kerckhoff (1856–1929), American businessman
  - Kerckhoff Dam, a reservoir dam in California named after him
  - Kerckhoff Marine Lab, southern California marine station owned and operated by Caltech named after him

== See also ==
- Kirchhoff, German cognate surname
