= Kerkhoven =

Kerkhoven ("church yards" in Dutch) can refer to either:

== Places ==
- Kerkhoven, Minnesota, United States
- Kerkhoven Township, Swift County, Minnesota, United States
- Kerkhoven (Netherlands), a former village, now a neighborhood of Oisterwijk, North Brabant
- Kerkhoven, Limburg, a hamlet in Belgian Limburg
- Kerkhove, a village in West Flanders, Belgium

== Dutch surname ==
- Caroline Constance Albertine Kerkhoven (1840–1915), Dutch writer and activist
- Lesley Kerkhove (born 1991), Dutch tennis player
- Marianne Van Kerkhoven (1946–2013), Belgian dramaturge and theater critic
- Robert Van Kerkhoven (born 1924), Belgian football midfielder
- Rudolf Eduard Kerkhoven (1848–1918), Dutch tea and coffee plantation owner on Java

== Others ==
- 11432 Kerkhoven, named after Rudolf Albert Kerkhoven (1879–1940), son of Rudolf Eduard Kerkhoven

== See also ==
- Kerkhof
- Kerckhoven
- Van Kerckhoven
