= Kerckhoven =

Kerckhoven is the surname of the following people:

- Jehan van der Kerckhove, Lord of Heenvliet (1594–1660), Dutch diplomat, husband of Katherine Stanhope, Countess of Chesterfield
- Abraham van den Kerckhoven (c.1618–c.1701), Flemish composer and organist
- Peter Frans Van Kerckhoven (1818–1857), Flemish writer
- Jan van Kerckhoven, editor of Gazet van Antwerpen between 1893 and 1899
- Anne-Mie van Kerckhoven (born 1951), Belgian artist
- Nico Van Kerckhoven (born 1970), Belgian footballer
- Robert Van Kerckhoven, Belgian footballer
- Patrick van Kerckhoven (DJ Ruffneck), Dutch darkcore/gabber DJ and producer

== See also ==
- Kerkhoven (disambiguation)
