= Joseph Kerckhoffs =

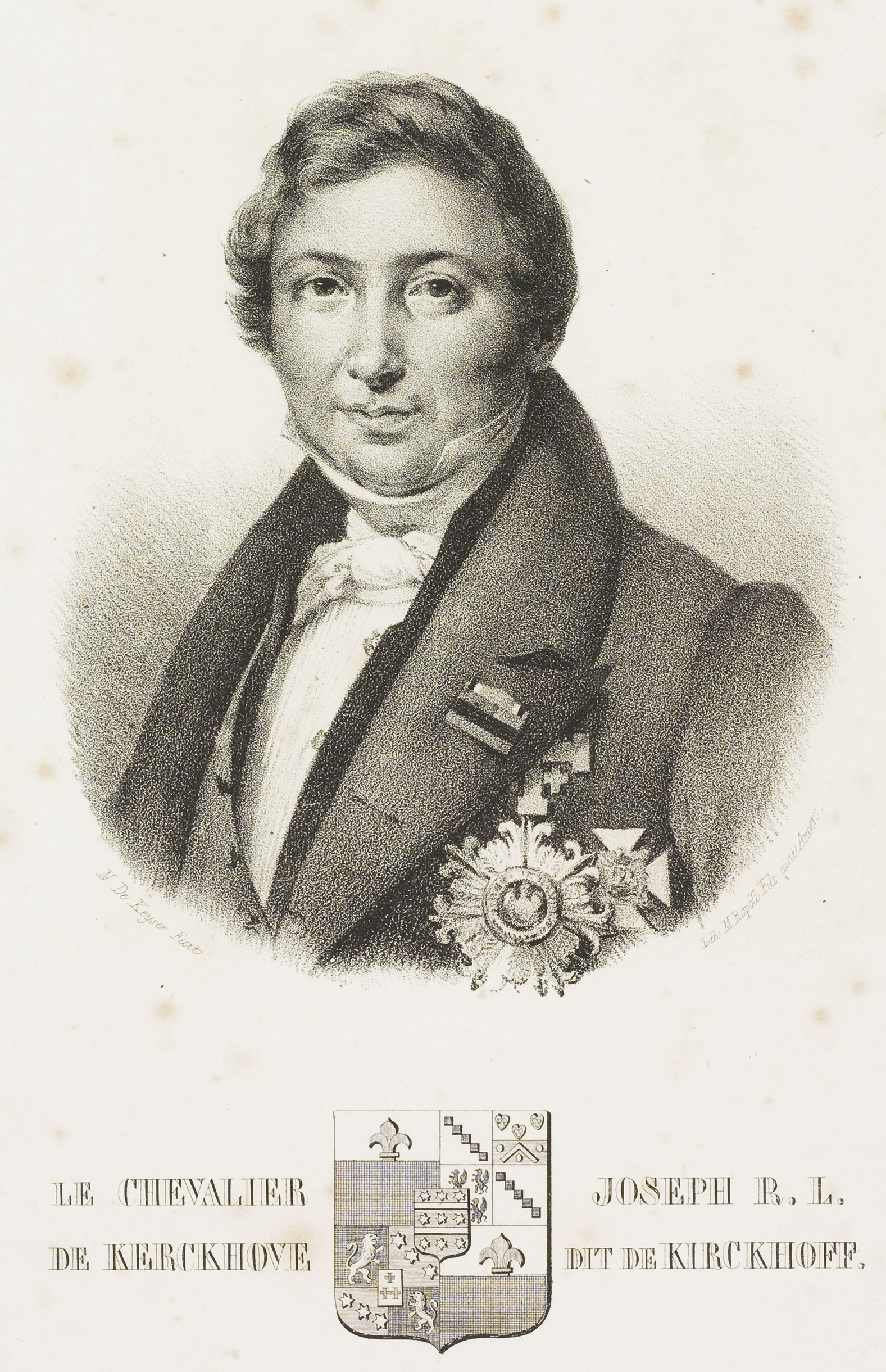
Joseph Romain Louis Kerckhoffs

Joseph Romain Louis Kerckhoffs (Nuth, 3 September 1789 – Mechelen, 10 October 1867) was a Dutch medical doctor. He was a medical doctor in Napoleon's army and after 1815 chief physician of the Dutch military hospitals. Numerous publications have been published by him to promote (military) medicine and combat quackery.

== Biography ==
Kerckhoffs was born in Grijzegrubben, Nuth, as the son of Joannes Franciscus Carolus Kerckhoffs, alderman, mayor and surgeon in Nuth. After being homeschooled by the Jesuit /home teacher Ceurvorst, he left for Heidelberg at the age of 16 to study law at the insistence of his parents, but Kerckhoffs chose to study medicine instead, obtaining his doctorate in 1811. On 23 January 1814 Kerckhoffs married Gregorine Chapuis in Maastricht, with whom he had a son in 1817: Eugène. In the 1810s and 1820s he served in the French and Dutch armies. He lived the last years of his life with his son in Mechelen, where he died in 1867 at the age of 78.

=== Career as an army doctor ===
After achieving his doctoral degree in 1811, Kerckhoffs was assigned to the main headquarters of the French army and took part in the Napoleonic campaigns. In 1812 he was assigned to the Headquarters of the Third Army Corps commanded by Marshal Ney and in 1813–1814 at the headquarters of the Second Army Corps under Marshal Victor, Duke of Bellune. After the fall of Napoleon, the Prussian government offered him to become chief physician of the Prussian army, but Kerckhoffs decided in 1815 to enter the service of the Netherlands in the lower rank of physician 1st class as chief of the medical service of the military hospitals in Liège, and in 1817 he was appointed officer of health and chief of the military hospitals in Antwerp. At his request, King Willem I dismissed him in 1823.

=== Physician and writer ===
After his career as an army doctor, Kerkchoffs focused more on health care for the underprivileged and writing medical articles. He opposed the closure of hospitals "because of the criminal economy" of King William I. At the invitation of Prince Frederik, he visited and worked in the Society of Humanitarianism in Drenthe, where he fought quackery and infectious diseases. During the cholera outbreak of 1832 in Antwerp, he mainly devoted himself to the needy class. The proceeds of his Memoirs de Cholera went to the poor.

== Personal life ==
He was the uncle of fellow Nuth native cryptographer Auguste Kerckhoffs.
