= Brand, Netherlands =

Brand
- Hamlet
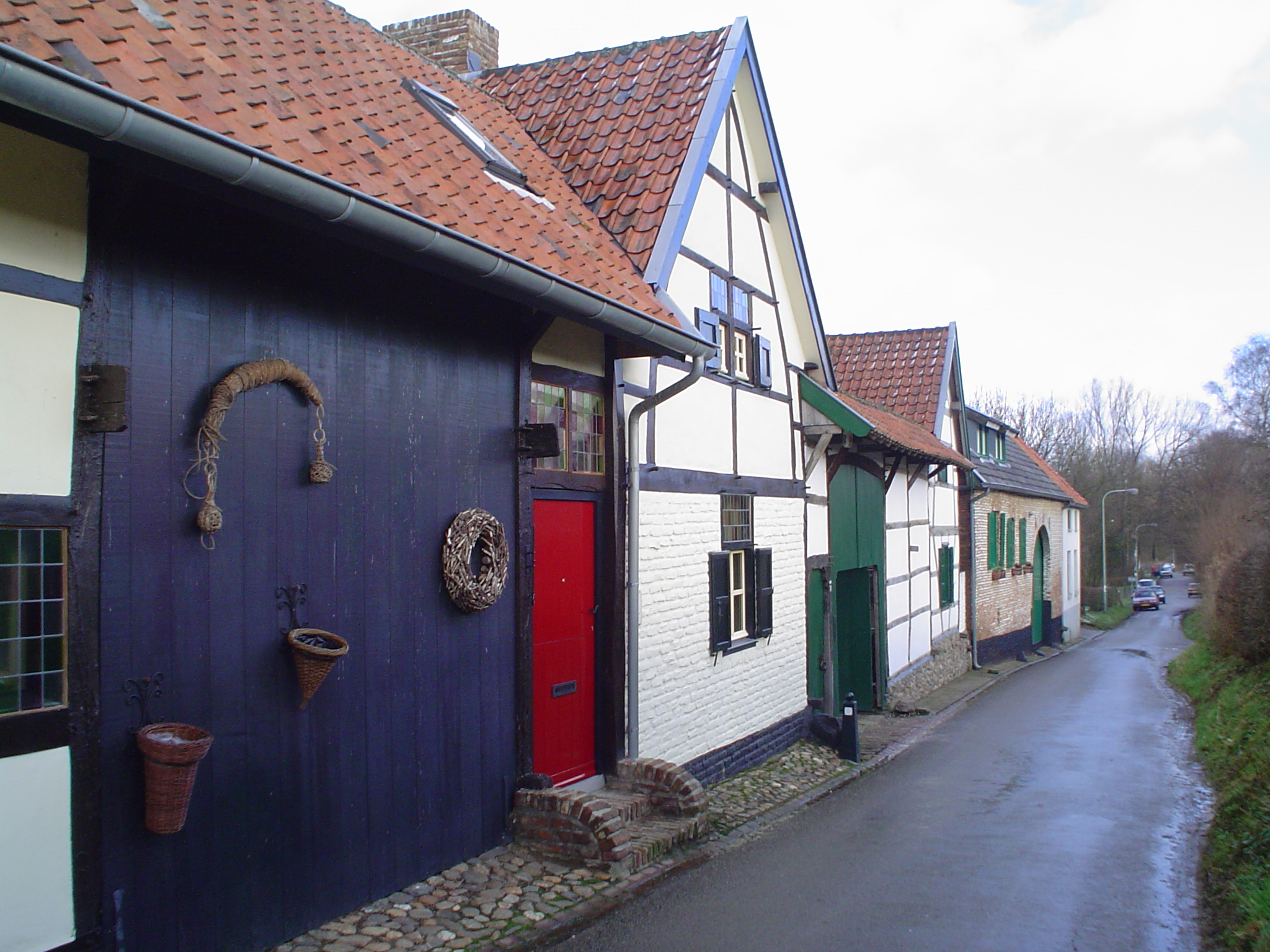
- Farmhouses with timber framing at the Branterweg

- Location in the Netherlands Location in the province of Limburg in the Netherlands
- Coordinates: 50°54′44″N 5°51′33″E
- Country: Netherlands
- Province: Limburg
- Municipality: Beekdaelen
- Time zone: UTC+1 (CET)
  - Summer (DST): UTC+2 (CEST)
- Postal code: 6361
- Dialing code: 045

Brand (Dutch pronunciation: [ˈbrɑnt], Limburgish: [ˈbʀɑnt]) is a hamlet in the municipality of Beekdaelen in the province of Limburg, the Netherlands. It is one of the so-called Bovengehuchten, or Upper Hamlets, of Beekdaelen. Brand is located south of the stream Platsbeek.

The hamlet consists of five houses along the Branterweg. This road connects the hamlets Tervoorst and Helle. Some houses, including a farm named Op genne Brant, are constructed with timber framing. Brand is often mistakenly regarded as part of the nearby hamlet Terstraten. Brand got its own town sign in 2003.
