= Risk and actuarial criminology =

Risk and actuarial criminology, unlike many other theories of crime, does not focus on the causality of crime. It believes the social world is too complex and interlocking to understand what causes a behaviour or action. This theory seeks to understand the emerging forms of social control that may lead to crime, and concentrates on assessing risk. Major aspects of this theory are the norms and rules of a society that propel behaviour and private sectors getting involved in citizens lives. This theory does not revolve around issues of justice, the criminal code, or laws, it focuses on questions of how to minimize risk of entrenchments on private security for the general population. Power is a key concept within risk and actuarial criminology. Power is the highest most emergent form of social control, which contains many interlocking sets of networks such as schools, licensing agencies, organizations etc. This theory looks at the effect of these powers on risk and the risk to our personal private security. Risk criminology studies changes such as the rise in private security. Risk criminology sees this change as the social institutions taking more and more interest in the private sector, as well as the public domain, such as the government becoming less involved, leaving room for self-governance. This means that because of these changes in social control, individuals behaviour is understood and analyzed with actuary science because agencies and organizations are taking an interest in the personal security and risk of their clients. Another change that risk assesses is the blurring of the line between private and public policing. In recent times, private policing outnumbers public policing, which confuses and fragments policing, which explains some patterns of behaviour in our day.

== Corrections ==
Since risk and actuarial criminology does not focus on the causality of crime, which so many theories focus on, it suggests a different perspective and application to corrections. This theory suggests that we stop reacting and dealing with the aftermath of criminals but look at pre-meditating factors such as why some groups have become dangerous? and what part of these societies do these groups threaten? It tells us that we need to better prepare the society to understand the risk that offender's hold.

== See also ==
- Kerckhoffs's principle
