= Jan Drummen =

Dutch architect (1891–1966)

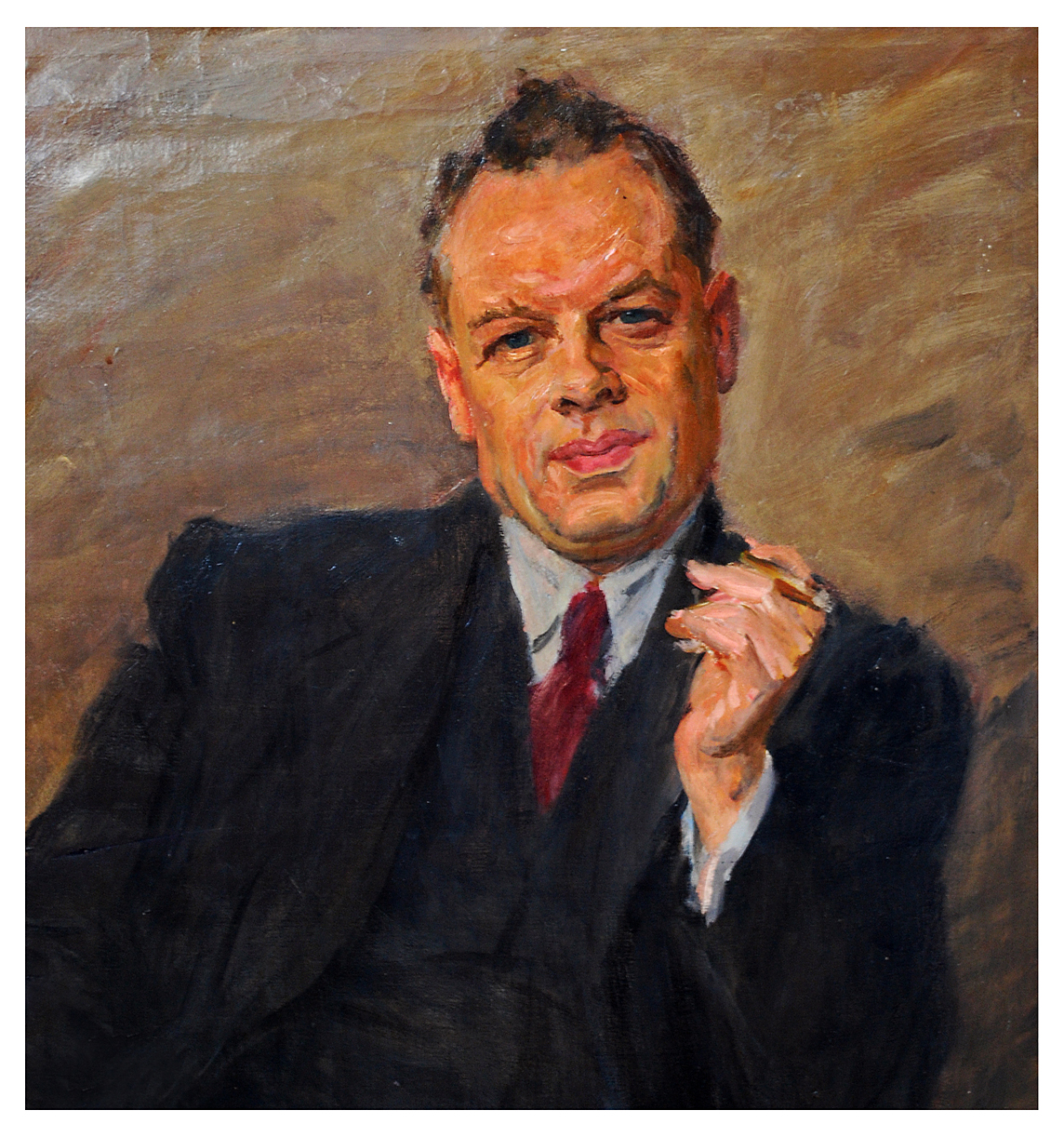
Painting of Drummen by Franz Heffels

Jan Drummen (18 March 1891 – 7 November 1966) was a Dutch architect.

He designed, among other things, the Lauradorp district in Ubach over Worms. Drummen studied at the drawing schools of Heerlen and Roermond. From 1918 to 1920 he was construction supervisor of the municipality of Nuth. From 1920 to 1942 he was municipal architect of Brunssum and subsequently director of municipal works. In 1950 he established himself as an independent architect. In 1917 he designed the doctor's practice residence, now designated as a national monument, called Antigone in Nuth, in a traditional style influenced by eclecticism. In addition to houses, he also designed shop premises, churches, schools and monasteries. In 1952 he built the parish church Immaculate Heart of Mary (Fatimakerk) and in 1957 the H. Pastoor van Arskerk in Eygelshoven, which has since been demolished. In 1953 he built an emergency church in Treebeek for the Rosary Parish.

Various schools are also registered in the name of his office: the craft schools of Brunssum and Hoensbroek, the expansion and new construction of the Niek Savio-Ulo in Lauradorp in the years 1955 and 1960, as well as the gymnastics hall next to the OLV school in Lauradorp in 1956. In Werkhoven he built the last cloister Godswerkhof for the Augustinian Sisters. He also seems to have built churches in Germany, but it is said that he used a pseudonym.

== Gallery ==
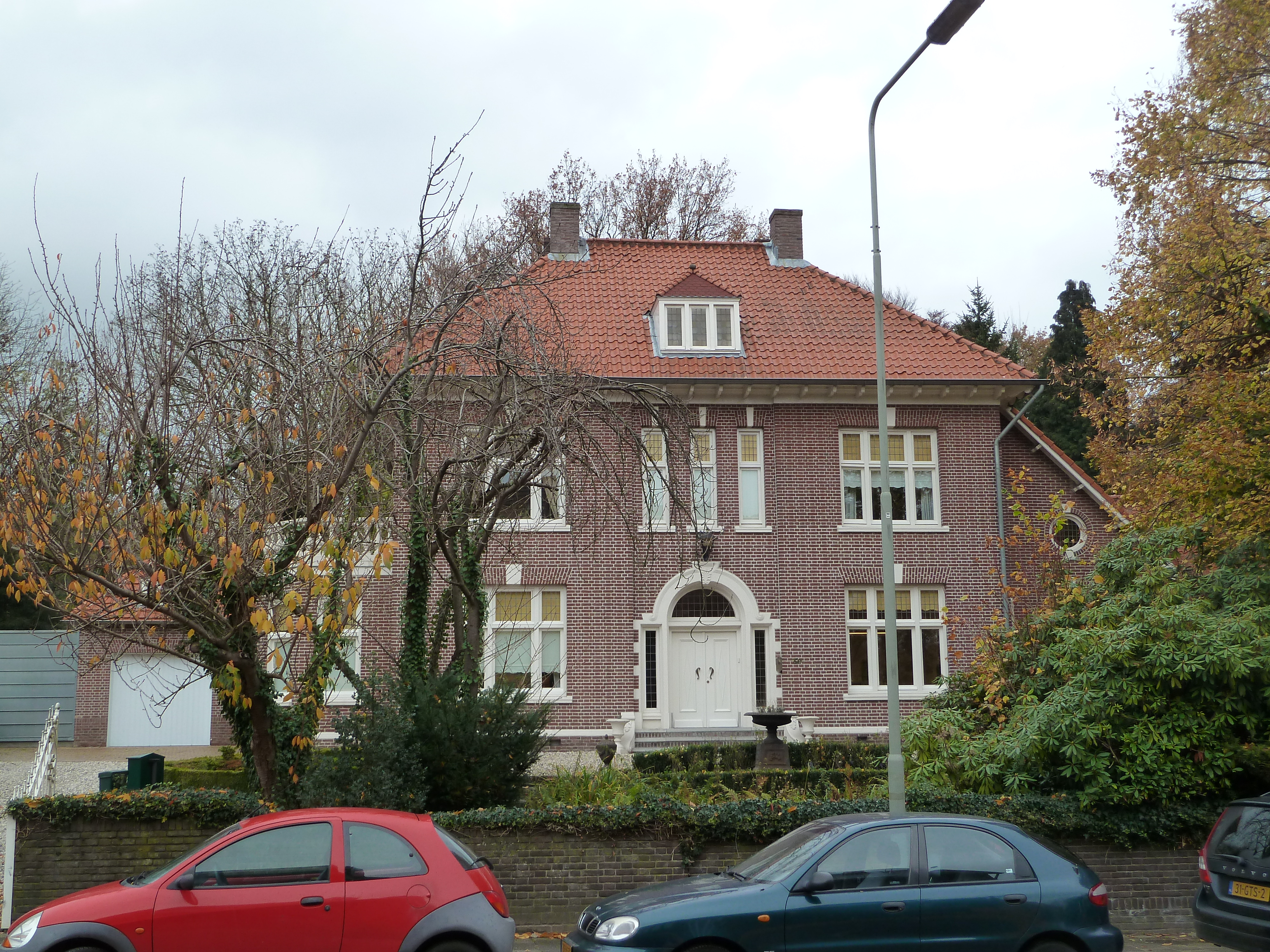
Arts-praktijkwoning, Nuth (1917)

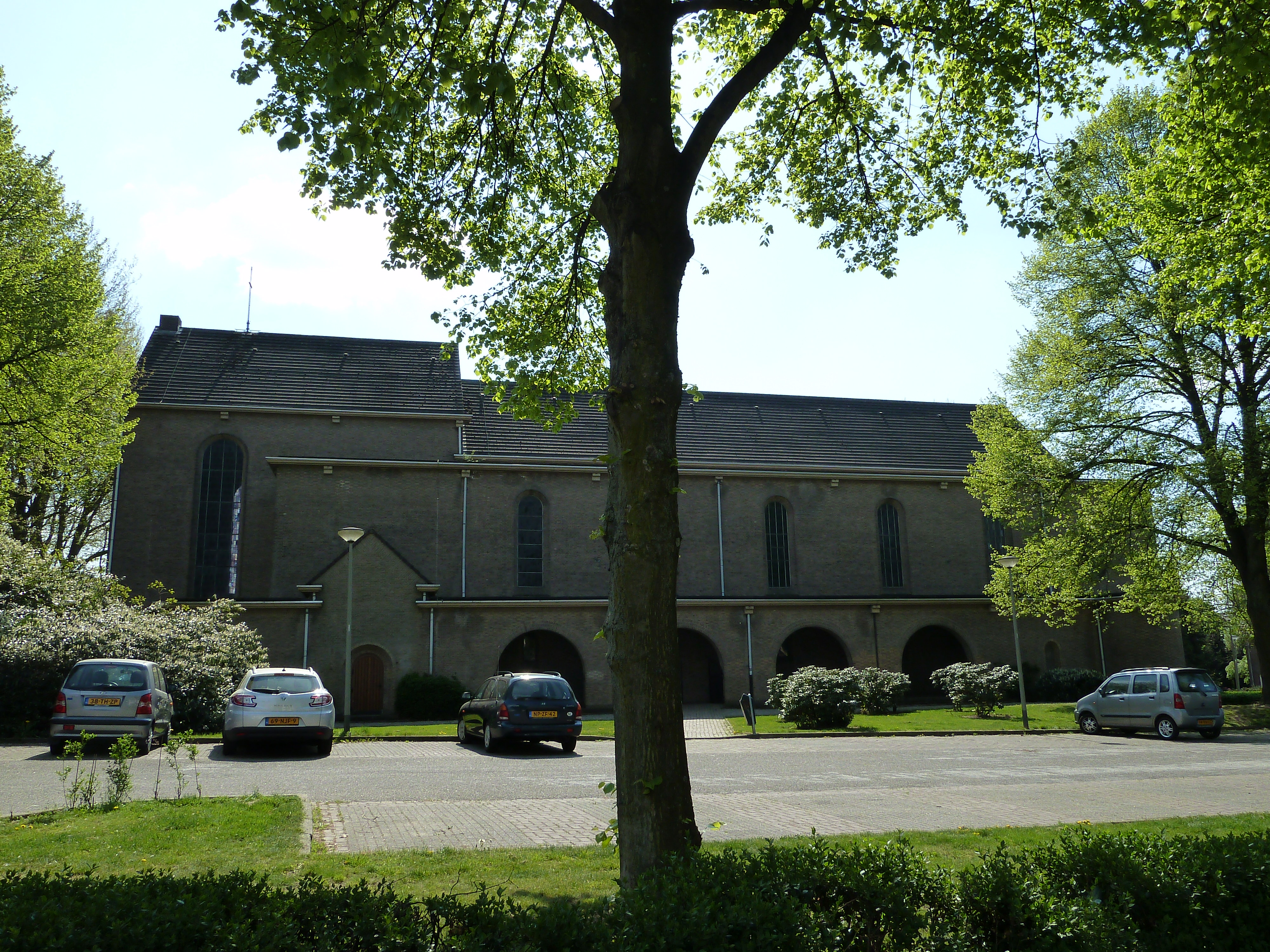
Immaculate Heart of Mary Church, Brunssum (1953)

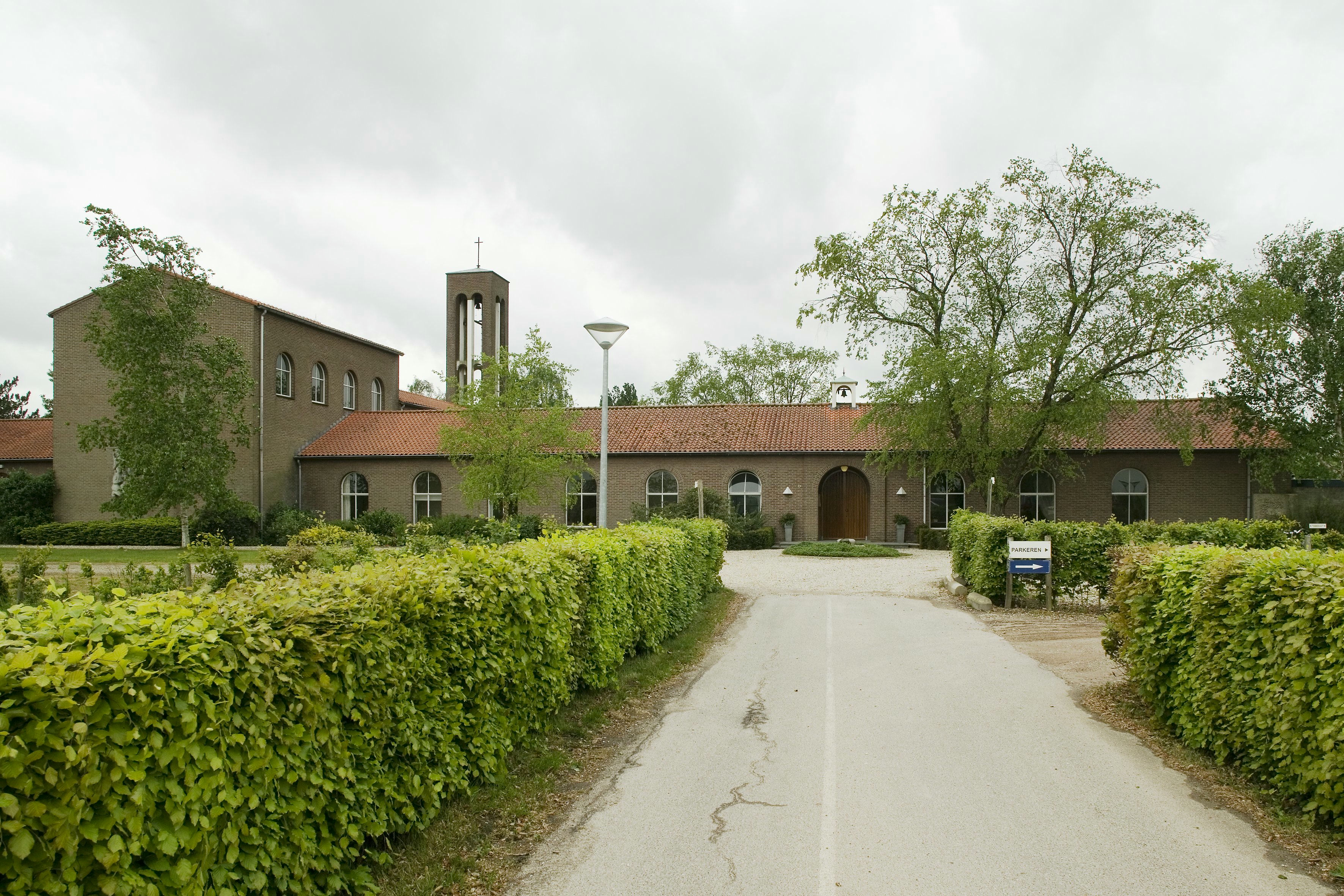
Priorij Gods Werkhof, Werkhoven (1960)
