= Karel van der Hucht =

Dutch astronomer (born 1946)

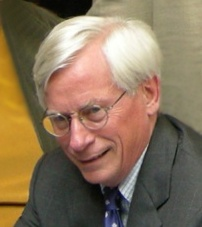
- Karel van der Hucht in July 2007
- Born: Karel Albertus van der Hucht; 16 January 1946 (age 80); Nuth, Netherlands
- Education: Utrecht University
- Occupation: Astronomer
- Scientific career
- Fields: Astronomy

Karel van der Hucht (born 16 January 1946) is a Dutch astronomer.

== Career ==
Van der Hucht, son of teacher Jan van der Hucht (1905) and Jannigje Verhoek (1913), studied (1964–1972) and obtained his PhD (1978) at Utrecht University, and held a postdoc position at the Joint Institute for Laboratory Astrophysics in Boulder, Colorado, USA (1978–1979). From 1972, he was employed by the Utrecht Laboratory for Space Research, at the time under the Committee for Geophysics and Space Research of the KNAW, from 1983 called Stichting Ruimte Onderzoek Nederland (SRON) as a senior scientist. In 1981, he compiled the first modern catalog of galactic Wolf–Rayet stars. In addition to his astronomical research in the ultraviolet, the infrared, the sub-mm region, the radio region and at X-ray wavelengths, and his more than 330 scientific publications on multispectral astronomical observations of hot old massive stars, mostly in international collaboration, he has organized many international conferences for space research and astronomy, including four International Astronomical Union (IAU) Symposia.

From August 2003 to August 2006, Van der Hucht was Assistant General Secretary of the IAU. On 31 August 2006, he was appointed General Secretary of the IAU at the XXVIth General Assembly of the IAU. This was the fourth time that this task fell to a Dutch astronomer, after Jan Hendrik Oort (1935–1940, 1946–1948), Pieter Oosterhoff (1951–1958) and Kees de Jager (1967–1973). Dutch presidents of the IAU were Jan Hendrik Oort (1958–1961), Adriaan Blaauw (1976–1979) and Lodewijk Woltjer (1994–1997).

As of 21 January 2011, Van der Hucht retired.

Van der Hucht was appointed an Officer in the Order of Orange-Nassau on Friday 26 April 2013 in Doorn.

=== Van der Hucht et al. Indisch Tea and Family Archive Foundation ===
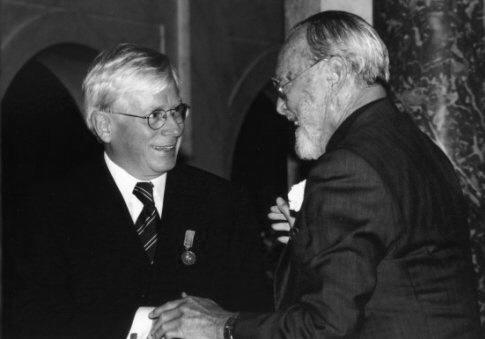
Van der Hucht receives the Zilveren Anjer from Prince Bernhard (20 June 2003)

Together with relatives, Karel van der Hucht founded the Van der Hucht et al. Indisch Tea and Family Archive Foundation (Dutch: Stichting Indisch Thee- en Familie archief Van der Hucht c.s.) in 1983. This archive, which he has been working on since the 1970s, now covers fourteen linear metres. The archive documents concern a group of Dutch East Indies families and their tea companies, now known as the Heren van de Thee, after the book by Hella S. Haasse. Van der Hucht has also assembled an image archive of approximately twelve hundred photos and dozens of films. The complete archive covers the period 1800–1950. He has been instrumental in publications by, among others, Rob Nieuwenhuys, Hella S. Haasse, Tom van den Berge, Norbert van den Berg and Rob Visser.

Prince Bernhard, then regent of the Prins Bernhard Cultuurfonds, presented Van der Hucht with a Zilveren Anjer on Friday 20 June 2003 in the Royal Palace of Amsterdam. Since 1950, the award has been awarded annually to a maximum of five people who have made a voluntary and unpaid contribution to culture or nature conservation in the Netherlands, the Netherlands Antilles and Aruba.

On 8 June 2006, a start was made with the transfer of the archive of the Van der Hucht et al. Indisch Tea and Family Archive Foundation to the Nationaal Archief.

== Trivia ==
The asteroid 10966 (3308 T-1), discovered on 26 March 1971 by Cornelis Johannes van Houten and Ingrid van Houten-Groeneveld on Palomar Schmidt recorded by Tom Gehrels is named after Van der Hucht.
