= Frans de Wever =

Dutch general practitioner

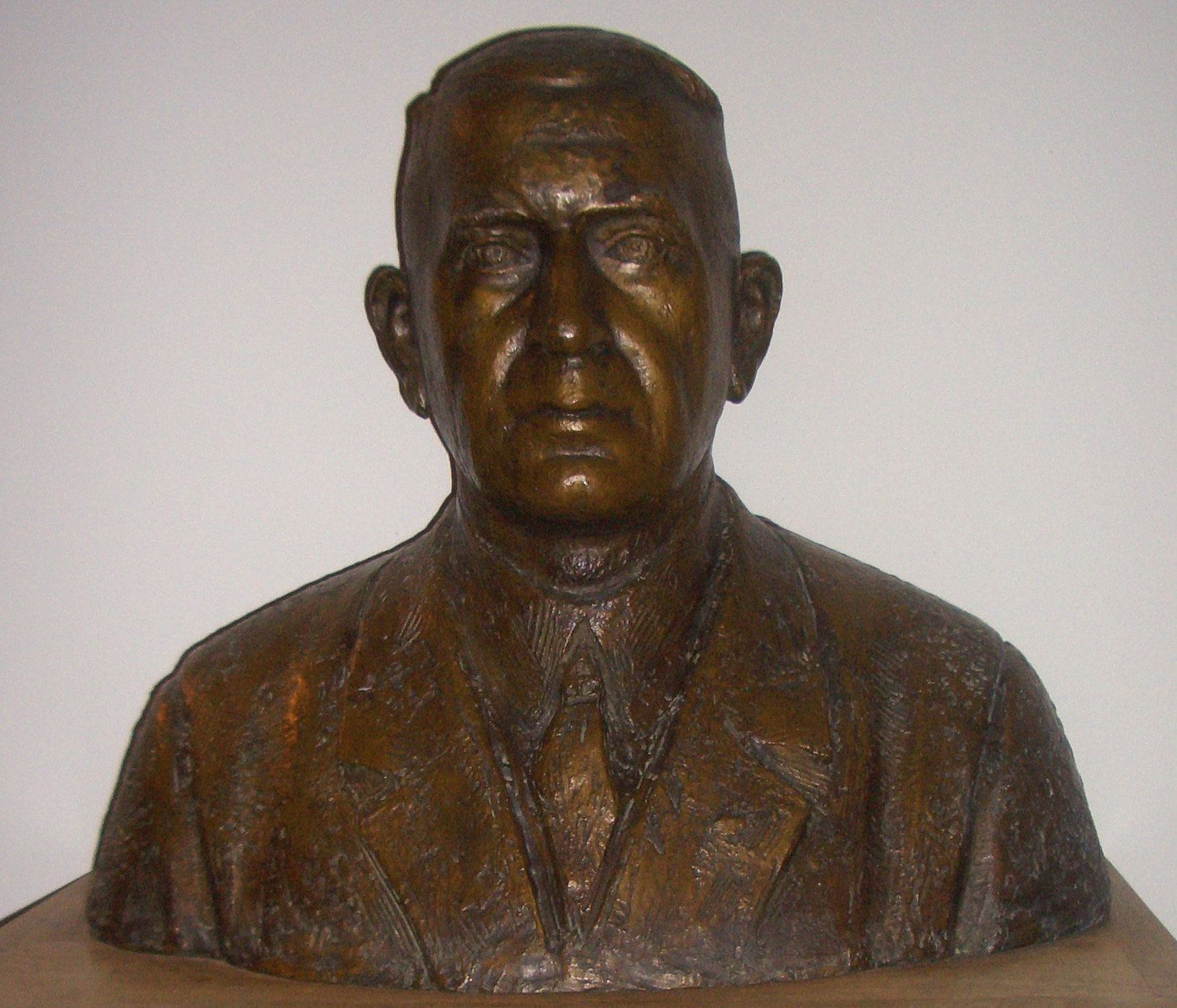
- Bust of Frans de Wever located in the old De Wever-Hospital (now Zuyderland M.C. Heerlen)
- Born: 29 January 1869; Nuth, Netherlands
- Died: 19 September 1940; Heerlen, Netherlands
- Occupation: Medical Doctor

Frans Marie Joseph de Wever (29 January 1869, in Nuth – 9 September 1940, in Heerlen) was a Dutch general practitioner, municipal doctor, rail doctor, mining doctor, and hospital founder.

== Early years in Heerlen ==
After graduating as a medical doctor, de Wever settled in Heerlen in 1897 (some sources say 1896) on the urge of mayor and pharmacist Charles de Hesselle (a colleague of de Wever's father, who was a pharmacist in Nuth).

He took over the practice of Karel Winckebach (one of the founders of cardiology).

In the early years he drove a carriage to serve his patients, but in November 1902 a car was used (made by Cudell from the nearby city of Aachen).

== A hospital ==
With mining operations expanding in Heerlen, too many patients were being wounded for de Wever to treat alone. These patients all had to be transported over poor roads to the Calvariënberg, a hospital in Maastricht. De Wever felt a hospital was needed in Heerlen.

There were already two hydrotherapy centers, called Mariabad and St. Josephs Heilbronn. After being declined by the Heilbronn to start a hospital, de Wever approached monseigneur Joseph Savelberg, Roman Catholic rector and founder of the sister congregation that ran Mariabad.

Although Savelberg was at first reluctant, presumably because his congregation was founded under the condition that it would not far in the other congregations' works. But the idea of a hospital set up near the mines, with the possibilities of Protestant doctors and nurses, convinced Savelberg to co-found the hospital.

In September 1904 Savelberg blessed the hospital, built in the garden of Mariabad, near the corner of Akerstraat and Putgraaf. Presumably the hospital was named Maria Hilf Spital. There were two wards (one for men and one for women) with ten beds each, two rooms per ward, one operating room, and a kitchen.
