= Vaesrade =

- Village
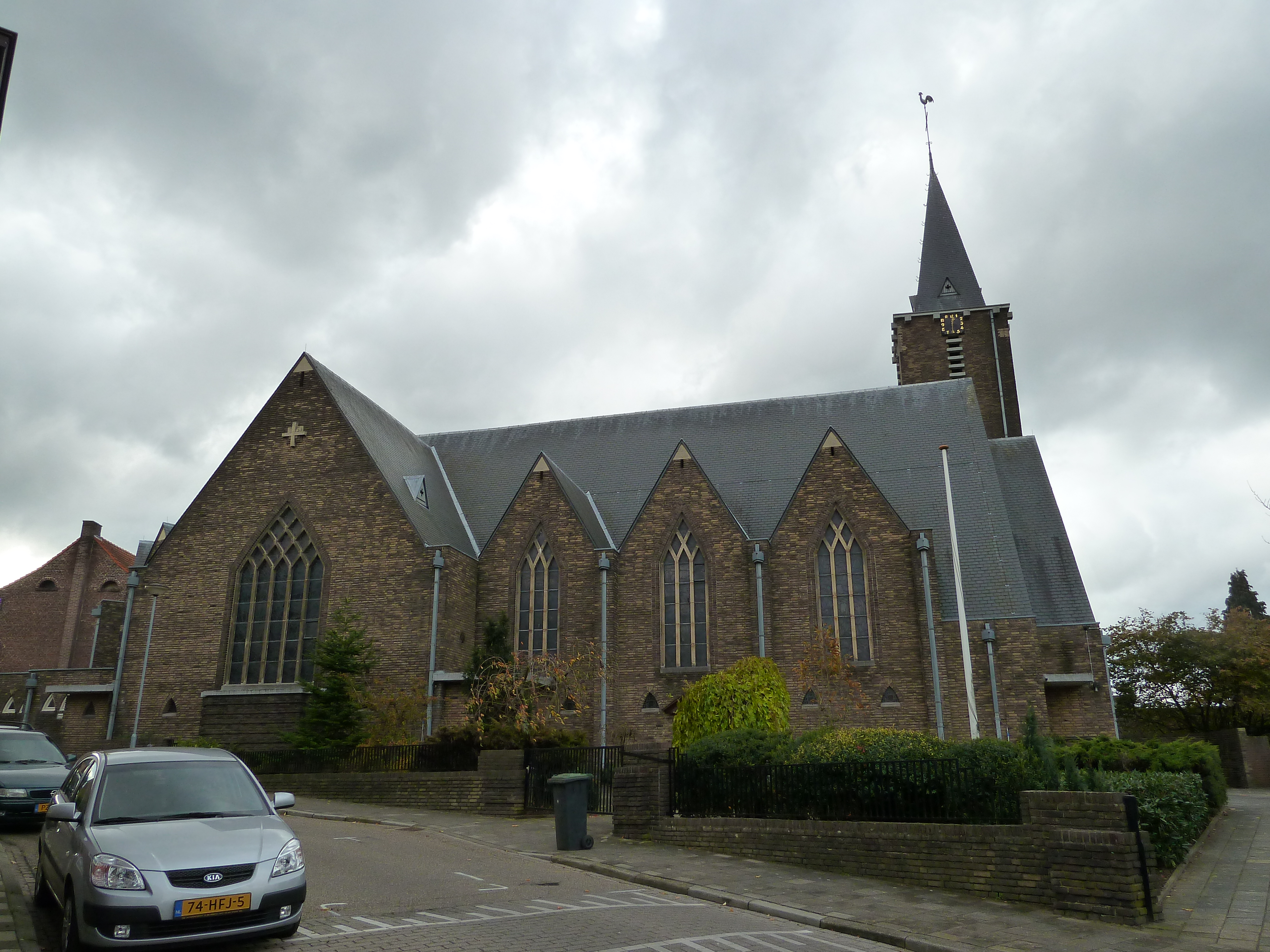
- St Servatius Church

- Location in the Netherlands Location in the province of Limburg in the Netherlands
- Coordinates: 50°55′45″N 5°54′22″E
- Country: Netherlands
- Province: Limburg
- Municipality: Beekdaelen

Area
  - Total: 2.08 km^{2} (0.80 sq mi)
- Elevation: 83 m (272 ft)

Population (2021)
  - Total: 990
  - Density: 480/km^{2} (1,200/sq mi)
- Time zone: UTC+1 (CET)
  - Summer (DST): UTC+2 (CEST)
- Postal code: 6361
- Dialing code: 045

Vaesrade (Dutch pronunciation: [ˈvaːsˌraːdə]; Limburgish: Vaosje [ˈvɔːʃə]) is a village in the Dutch province of Limburg. It is located in the municipality of Beekdaelen.

The village was first mentioned in 1139 as Wastrode. The etymology is unclear, but contrary to popular belief there is no relation to Servatius of Tongeren.

The first church was built in 1856. In 1929, the St Servatius Church was built in expressionist style and has a square tower next to the entrance.

In 1840, Vaesrade was home to 198 people. Vaesrade was a separate municipality until 1821, when it was merged with Nuth. In 2019, it became part of the municipality of Beekdaelen.

== Gallery ==
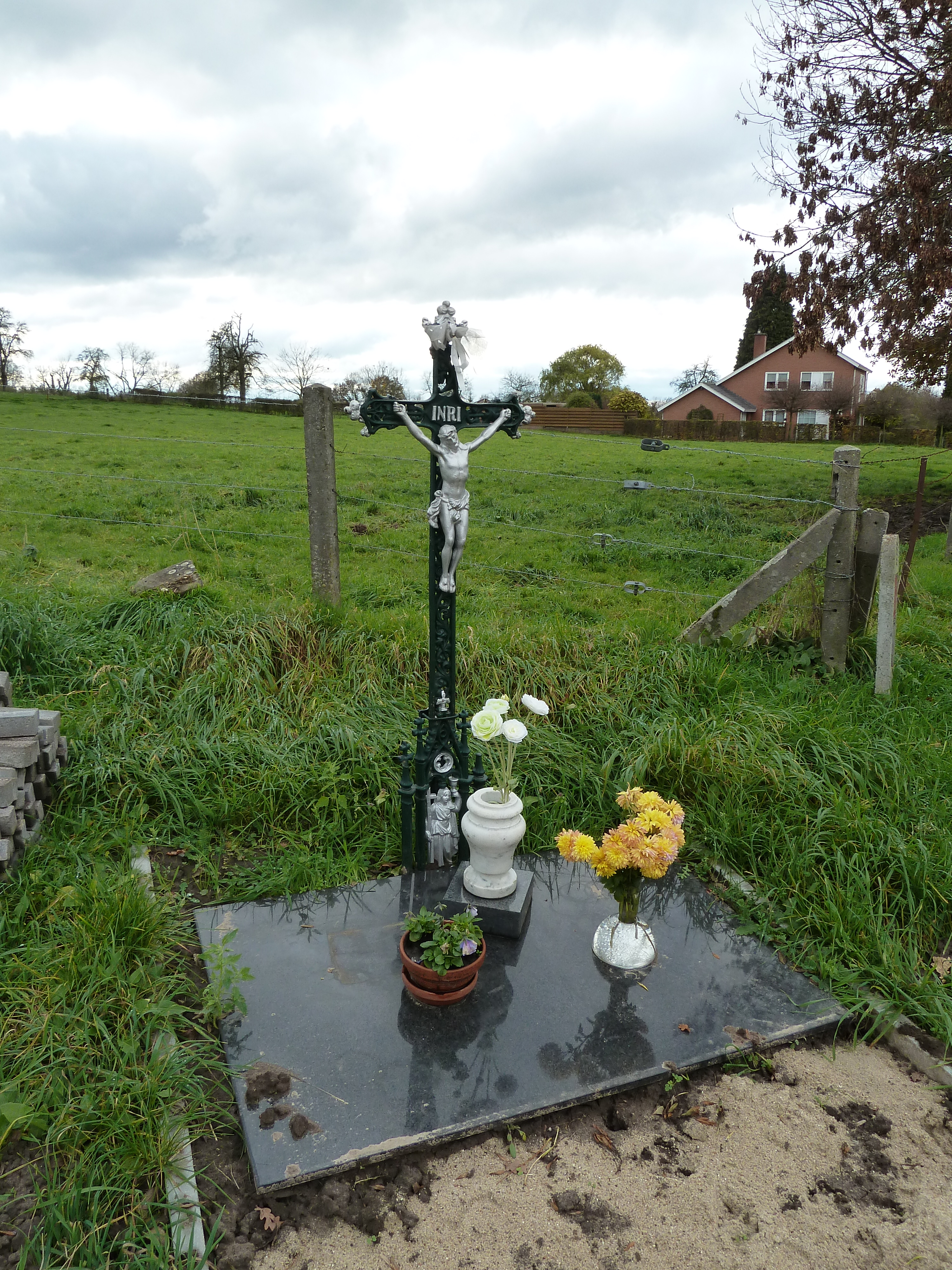
Cross at Vaesrade, Limburg, the Netherlands

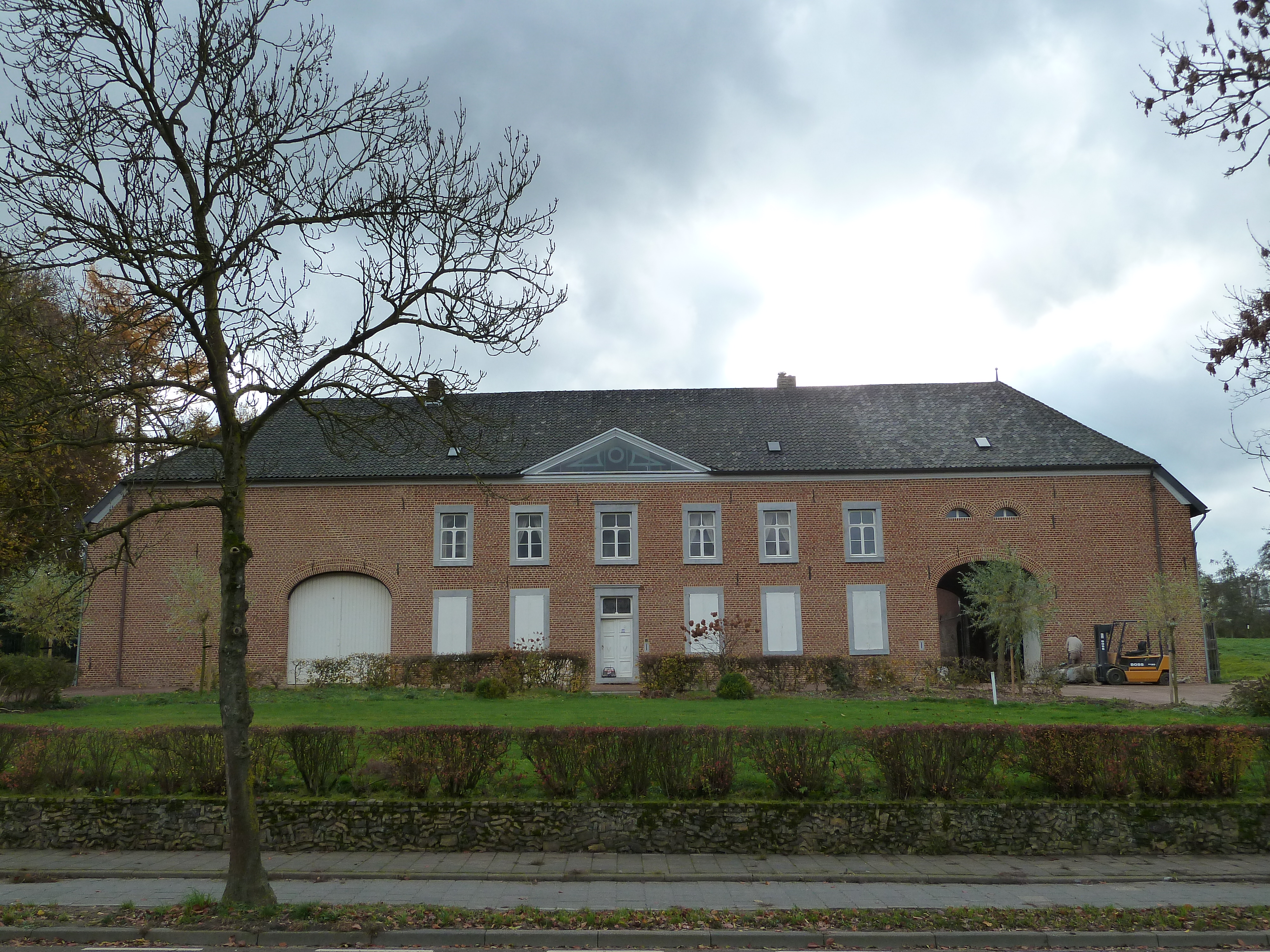
Farm in Vaesrade

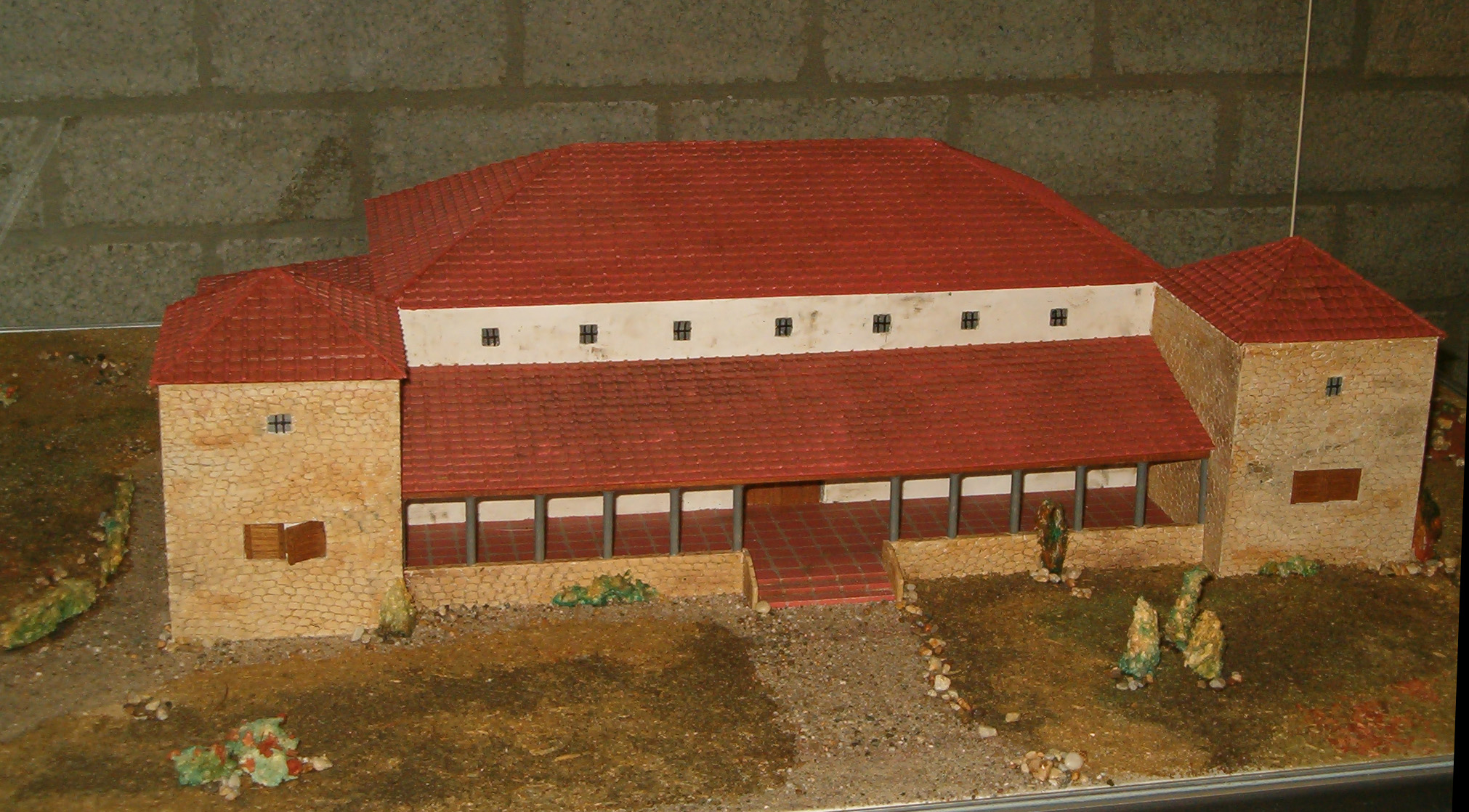
Reconstruction of Roman village
