= Tervoorst =

- Hamlet
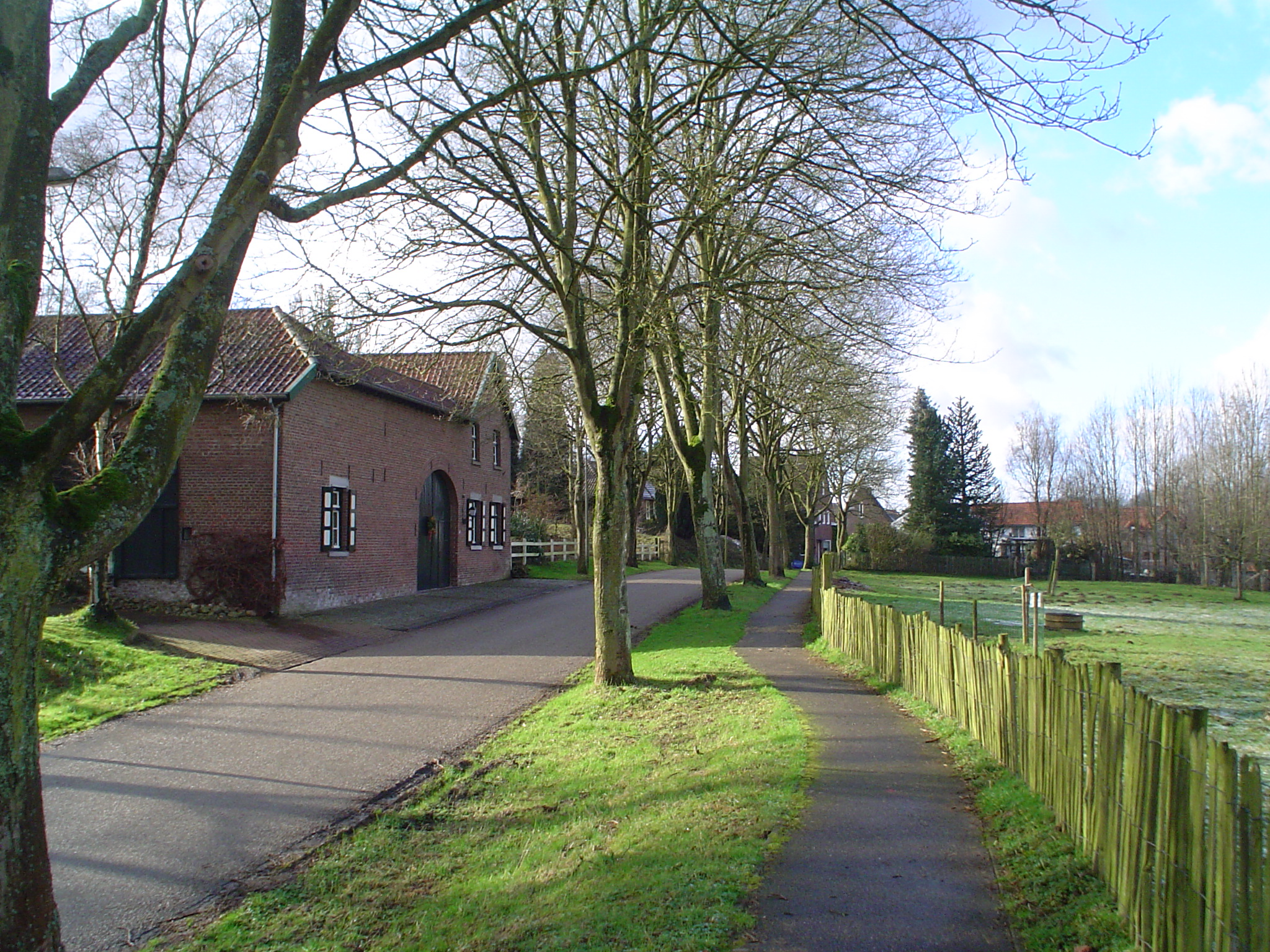
- The Voorsterstraat

- Location in the Netherlands Location in the province of Limburg in the Netherlands
- Coordinates: 50°54′54″N 5°52′13″E
- Country: Netherlands
- Province: Limburg
- Municipality: Beekdaelen
- Time zone: UTC+1 (CET)
  - Summer (DST): UTC+2 (CEST)
- Postal code: 6361
- Dialing code: 045

Tervoorst (Dutch pronunciation: [tɛrˈvoːrst]; Limburgish: Tervoeësj [tæʀˈvuəʃ]) is a hamlet in the municipality of Beekdaelen in the province of Limburg, the Netherlands.

The hamlet contains approximately 105 houses, located in a linear pattern along the Voorsterstraat and the Horenweg, which run from the village of Nuth until the hamlet Brand. The Platsbeek river flows to the north of the settlement. In the south there is a hill supporting the nearby Hunnecum hamlet's windmill as well as houses situated on its slopes.
