= Van Kerckhoven =

Van Kerckhoven is a surname. Notable people with the surname include:

- Anne-Mie van Kerckhoven (born 1951), Belgian artist
- Nico Van Kerckhoven (born 1970), Belgian footballer
- Patrick van Kerckhoven (born 1970), Dutch DJ
- Peter Frans Van Kerckhoven (1818–1857), Flemish writer
- Willem Frans Van Kerckhoven (1853–1892), Belgian soldier, explorer, colonial administrator
