= Wijnandsrade =

- Village
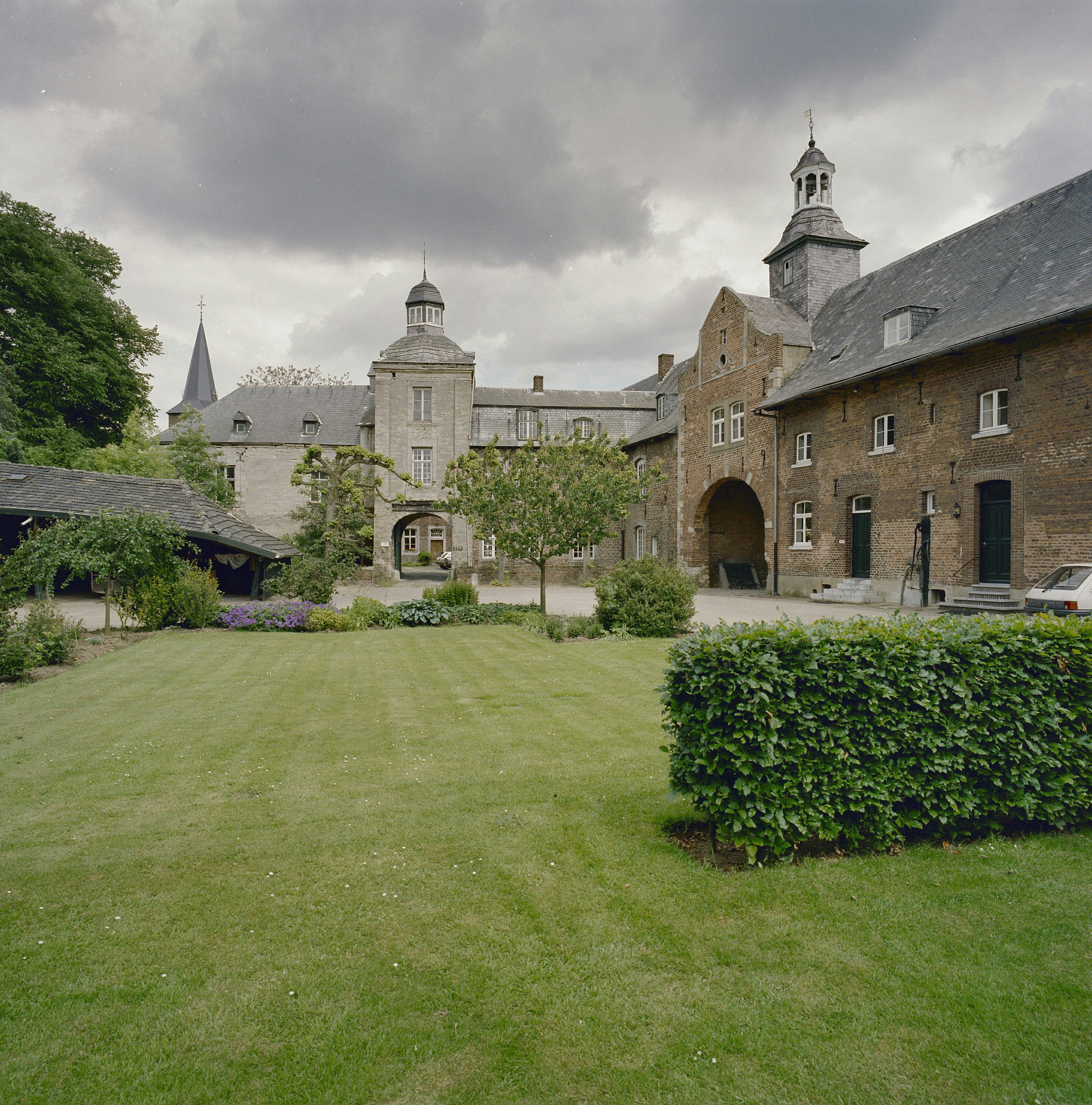
- Castle Wijnandsrade courtyard

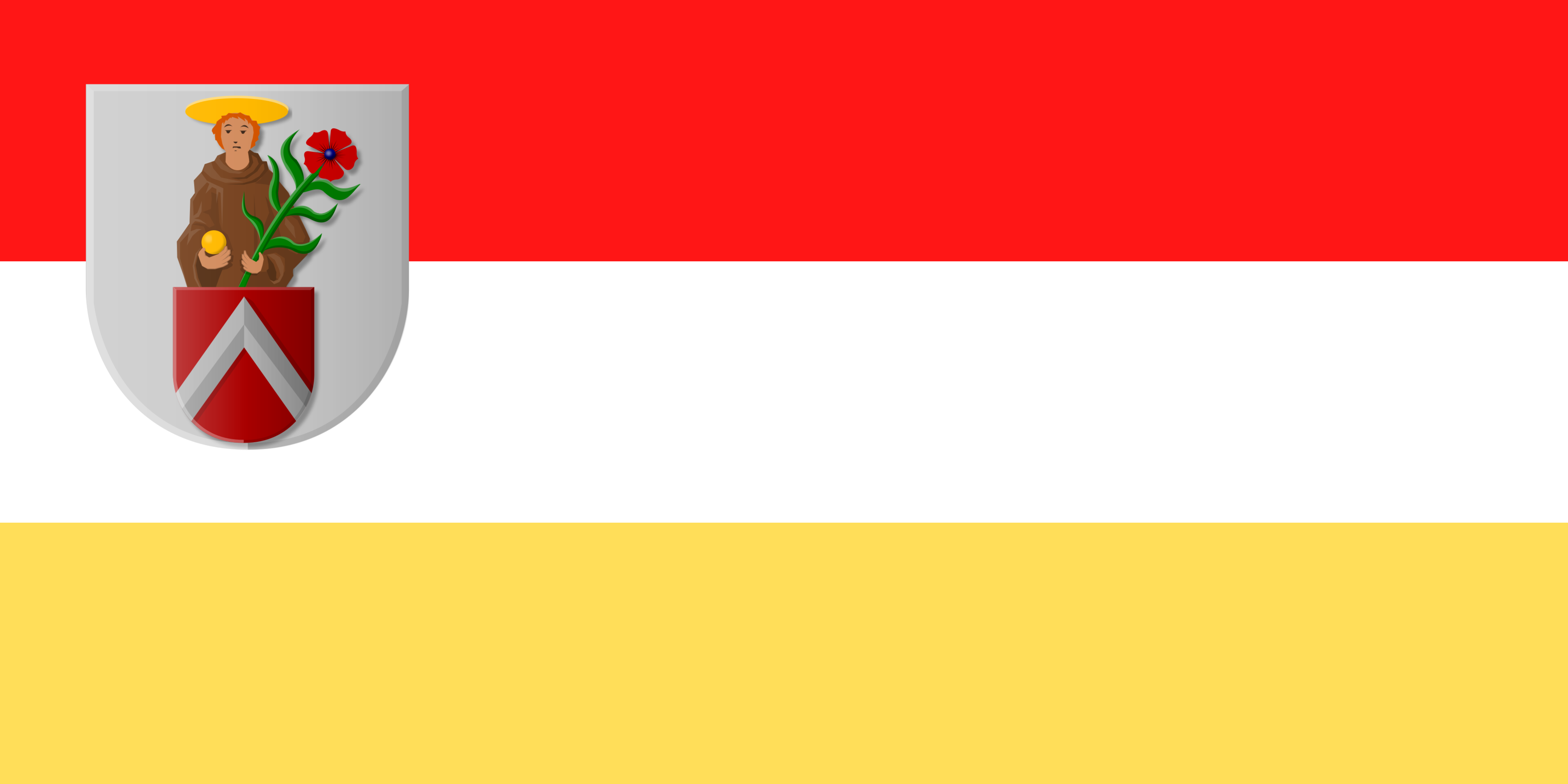
- Flag Coat of arms

- Location in the Netherlands Location in the province of Limburg in the Netherlands
- Coordinates: 50°54′20″N 5°52′58″E
- Country: Netherlands
- Province: Limburg
- Municipality: Beekdaelen

Area
  - Total: 1.23 km^{2} (0.47 sq mi)
- Elevation: 84 m (276 ft)

Population (2021)
  - Total: 2,370
  - Density: 1,930/km^{2} (4,990/sq mi)
- Time zone: UTC+1 (CET)
  - Summer (DST): UTC+2 (CEST)
- Postal code: 6191
- Dialing code: 046

Wijnandsrade (Dutch pronunciation: [ˈʋɛinɑntsˌraːdə]; Limburgish: Wienesrao [ˈwiːnəsʀɔː]) is a village in the Dutch province of Limburg. It is located in the municipality of Beekdaelen. It is notable for its castle and church and two ponds, which define the village's centre.

== History ==
The village was first mentioned between 1247 and 1288 as Rode, which means "cultivated forest". In the 14th century Wijnand was added after Winant van de Bongard to distinguish from other "rade" villages. Wijnandsrade developed in the Middle Ages. There was a motte-and-bailey castle near the village in the 12th century where a chapel was erected.

The remains of the motte castle are located between the church and the current Wijnandsrade Castle. The oldest parts were built in 1554. The eastern and southern wings were added between 1717 and 1719. Between 1930 and 1932, it was converted into a Franciscan monastery and extensively modified. The castle is nowadays used as offices and apartments.

The St Stephanus Church was rebuilt in 1628 and modified and enlarged in 1754. The tower was destroyed in 1943 and rebuilt in 1948.

Wijnandsrade was home to 196 people in 1840. It was a separate municipality until 1982, when it was merged with Nuth. In 2019, it became part of Beekdaelen.

== Gallery ==
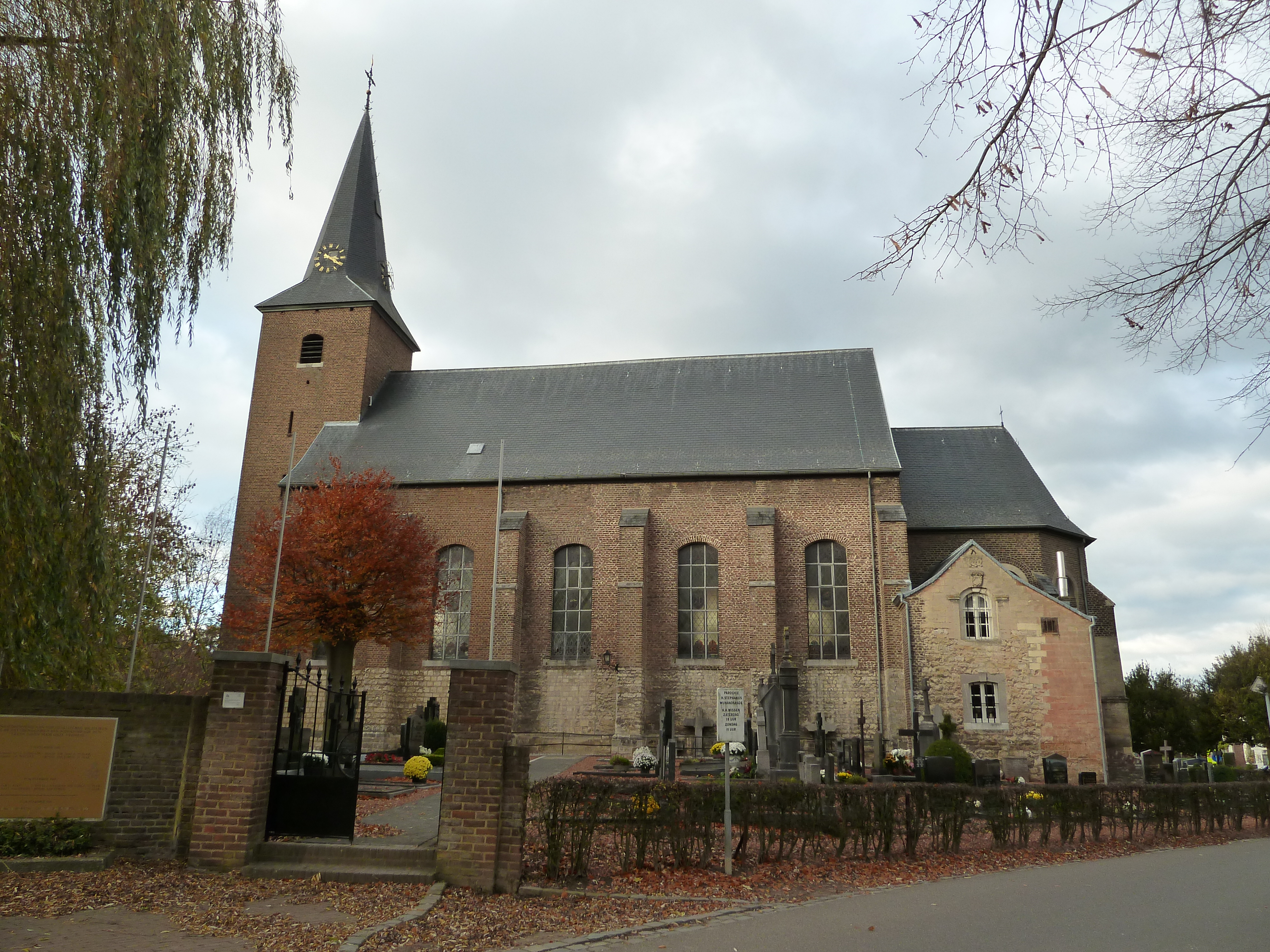
St Stefanus Church

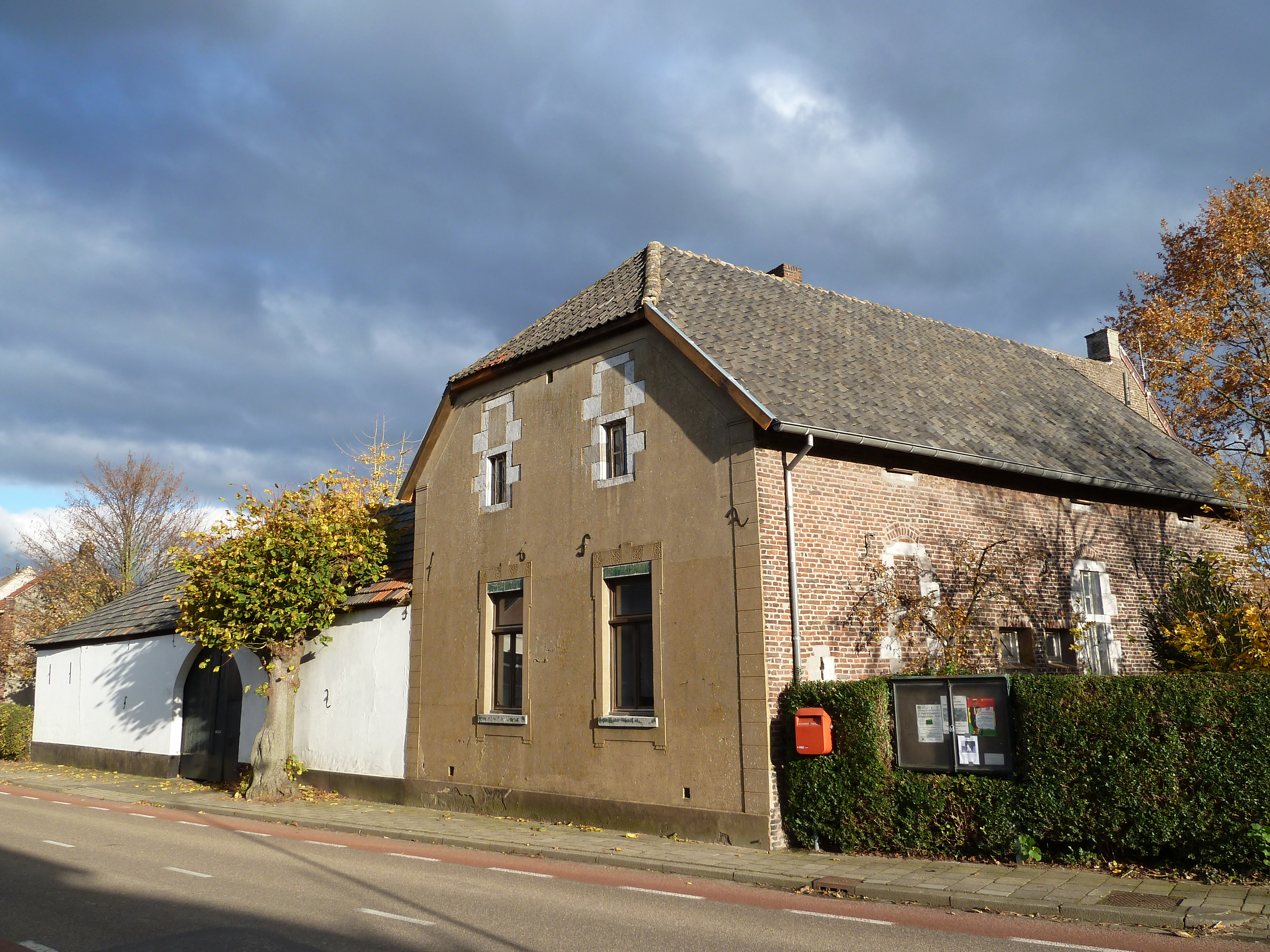
House in Wijnandsrade

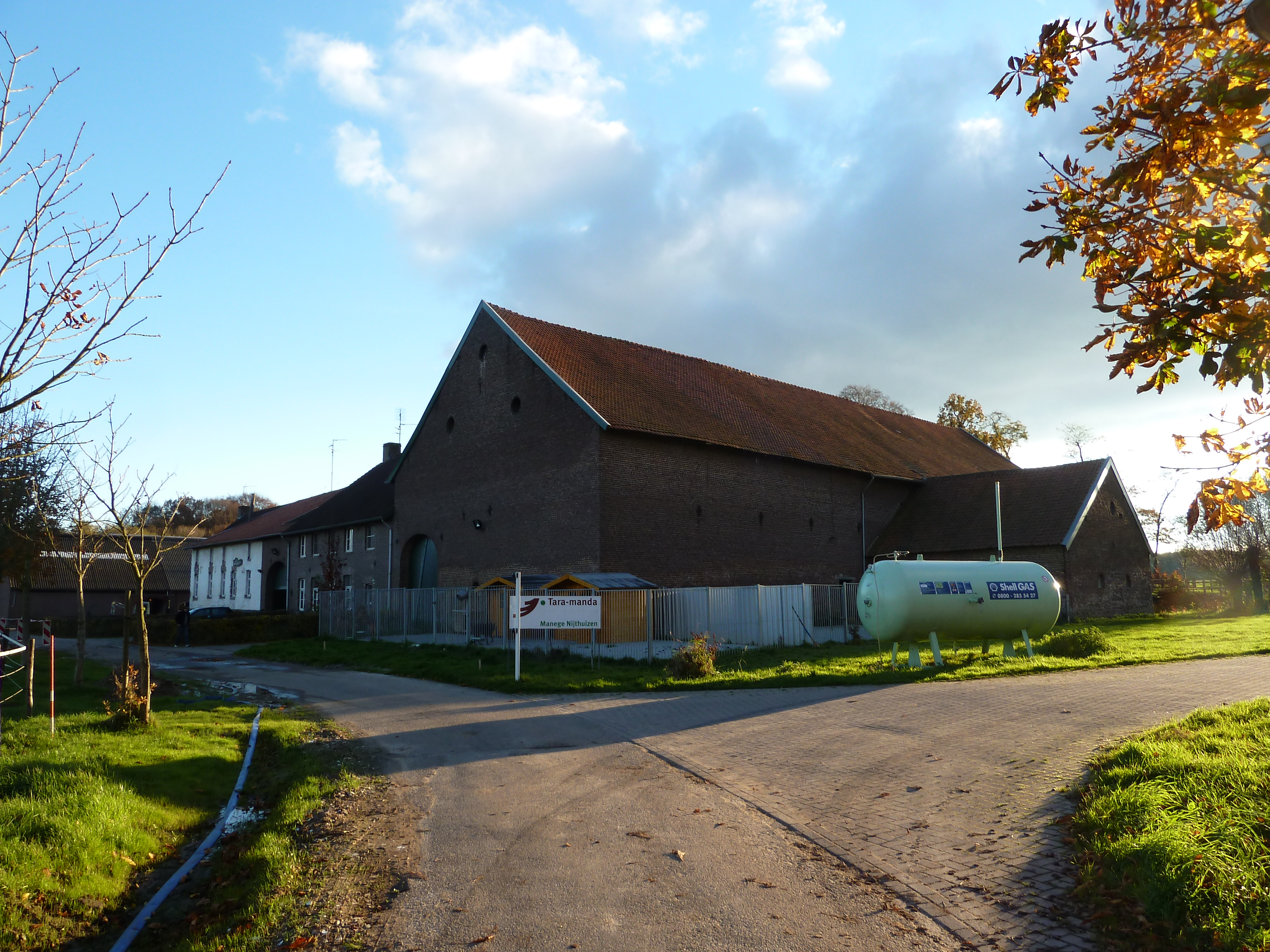
Farm in Wijnandsrade

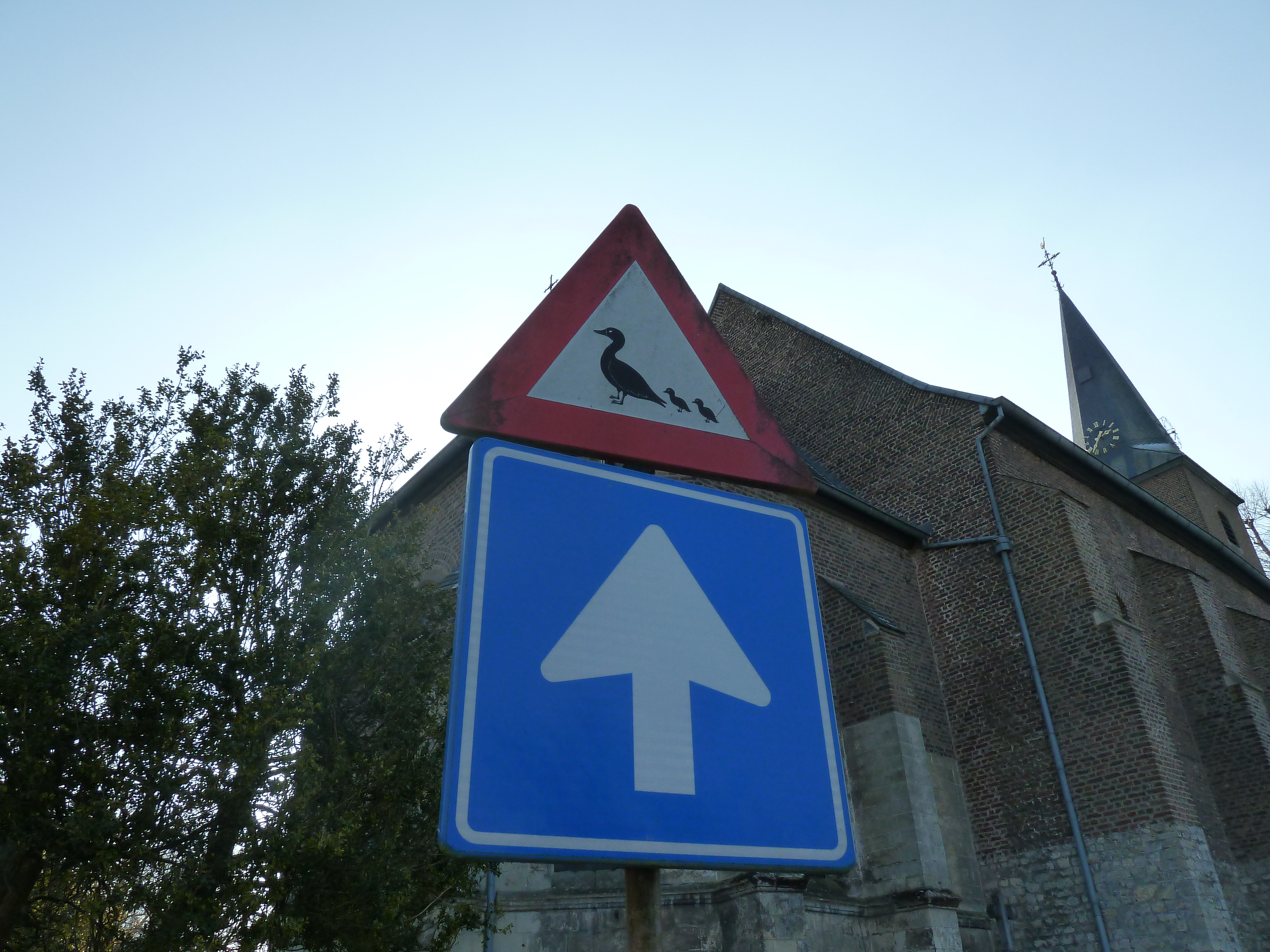
One way street with ducks
