= Kerkhof (surname) =

Kerkhof (pronounced [ˈkɛr(ə)kɦɔf]) is a Dutch toponymic surname meaning "church garden". Alternative spellings include: Kerekhoff, Kerkhoff, Van Kerkhof.

An ancestor may have lived near or worked in the church yard, or have come from a number of villages and hamlets named Kerkhove or Kerkhoven. Among variant forms of the surname are Kerckhoff(s), Kerkhoff(s), Kerkhove(n), and Van (de) Kerkhof(f). Notable people with the surname include:

- Ian Kerkhof (since 1999 Aryan Kaganof; born 1964), South African-Dutch film maker, novelist, and poet
- Louis-Joseph Kerkhofs (1878–1962), Roman Catholic bishop
- Nikki Kerkhof (born 1983), Dutch singer
- Tim Kerkhof (born 1993), Dutch racing cyclist

Kerkhoff(s)

- Bernd Kerkhoff (fl. 1975), German rower
- Guido Kerkhoff (born 1967), German business executive
- Matthias Kerkhoff (born 1979), German politician
- Pierre Kerkhoffs (1936–2021), Dutch football striker

Van Kerkhof

- Bram van Kerkhof (born 1948), Dutch football midfielder and manager
- Sanne van Kerkhof (born 1987), Dutch short track speed skater, sister of Yara
- Yara van Kerkhof (born 1990), Dutch short-track speed-skater, sister of Sanne

Van de(n) Kerkhof

- Kevin Van Den Kerkhof (born 1996), French professional footballer
- René van de Kerkhof (born 1951), Dutch football winger, twin brother of Willy
- Willy van de Kerkhof (born 1951), Dutch football midfielder, twin brother of René

== See also ==
- John Kerkhof Park, a venue for football matches in Cambridge, New Zealand, named after the Dutch immigrant former president of the Cambridge Football Club
