= Jos Schreurs =

Dutch priest and politician (1934–2022)

Member of the Senate of the Netherlands
- In office 1980 – 10 June 1981

Personal details
- Born: Marie Guillaume Gerard Joseph Schreurs; 18 November 1934 Nuth, Netherlands
- Died: 10 April 2022 (aged 87) Sittard-Geleen, Netherlands
- Party: CDA
- Education: Universiteit voor Theologie en Pastoraat
- Occupation: Priest

Marie Guillaume Gerard Joseph Schreurs (18 November 1934 – 10 April 2022) was a Dutch Roman Catholic priest and politician. A member of the Christian Democratic Appeal, he served in the Senate from 1980 to 1981. He died in Sittard-Geleen on 10 April 2022 at the age of 87.
