= Helle, Beekdaelen =

Helle
- Hamlet
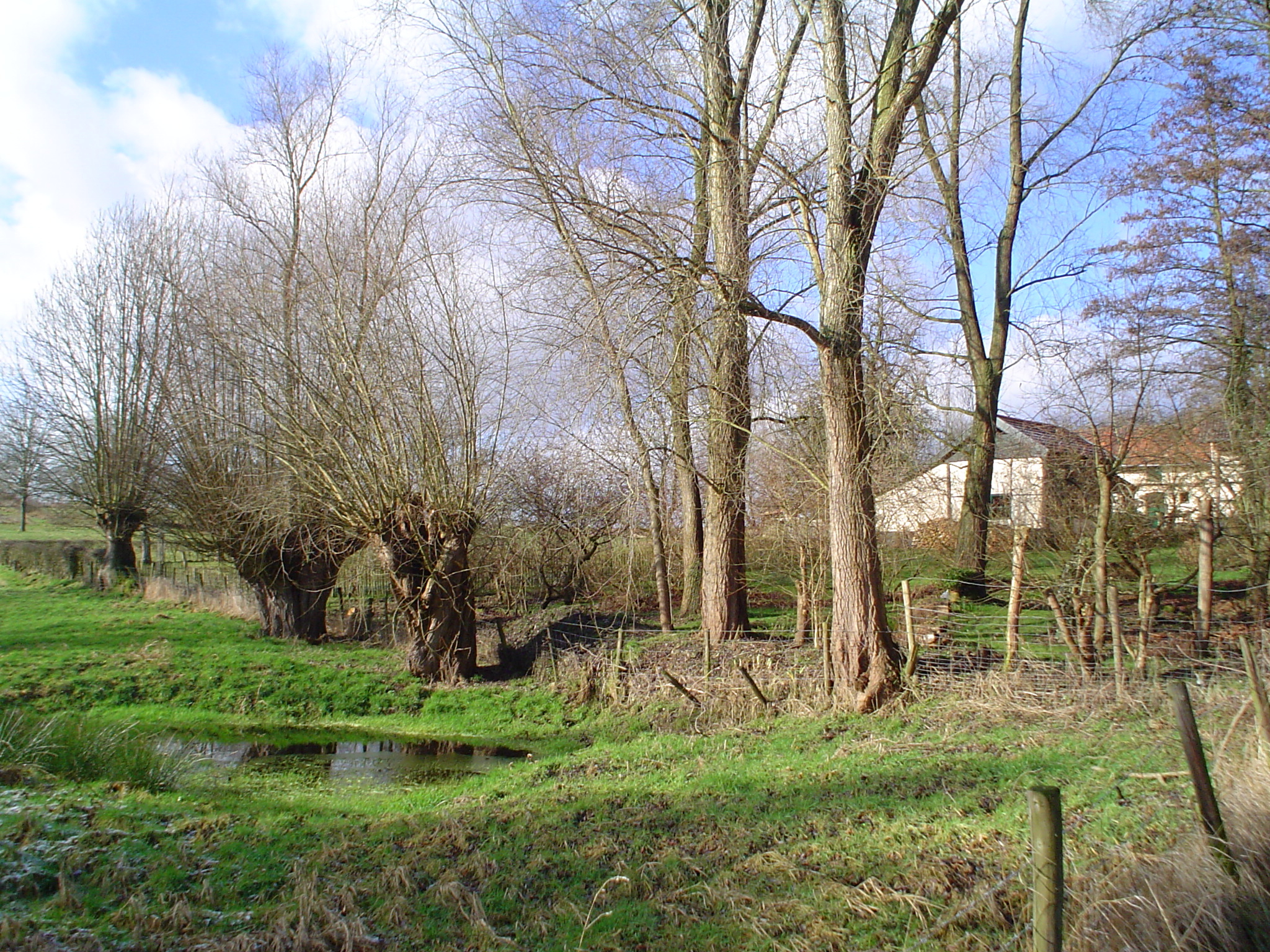
- A puddle near the Nelisweg in Helle

- Location in the Netherlands Location in the province of Limburg in the Netherlands
- Coordinates: 50°54′37″N 5°51′7″E
- Country: Netherlands
- Province: Limburg
- Municipality: Beekdaelen
- Time zone: UTC+1 (CET)
  - Summer (DST): UTC+2 (CEST)
- Postal code: 6361
- Dialing code: 045

Helle (Dutch pronunciation: [ˈɦɛlə]; Limburgish: G'n Hèl [ɣən ˈɦɛl]) is a hamlet in the municipality of Beekdaelen in the province of Limburg, the Netherlands. It is one of the so-called Bovengehuchten, or Upper Hamlets, of Beekdaelen. It is located between the village of Schimmert and the hamlet Terstraten.

The name Helle probably originates from helde, or hill. This could be a reference to the many hills and hollow ways near the hamlet.

South of Helle flows the stream Platsbeek through a varied landscape of forest, grassland and puddles.

It used to have place name signs, but the signs were removed after 2005. Helle was home to 180 people in 1840. Nowadays, it consists of about 10 houses.
