= Kerkhove =

Village in Belgium

Coordinates: 50°47′54″N 3°30′02″E

Coat of arms of Kerkhove

Location of Kerkhove within Avelgem

Kerkhove is a village in the Belgian province of West Flanders and is a submunicipality of Avelgem. It was an independent municipality until 1977. It covers an area of 365 ha (900 acres) and had 928 inhabitants in 2003.

== History ==
Archaeological finds show that the area between the current village centres of Waarmaarde and Kerkhove was already a distinct human settlement in prehistoric times.

Kerkhove as a selltment was first mentioned in 1119. At the end of the 17th century, the right of patronage belonged to the St. Peter's Abbey in Ghent.
