= Arensgenhout =

- Hamlet
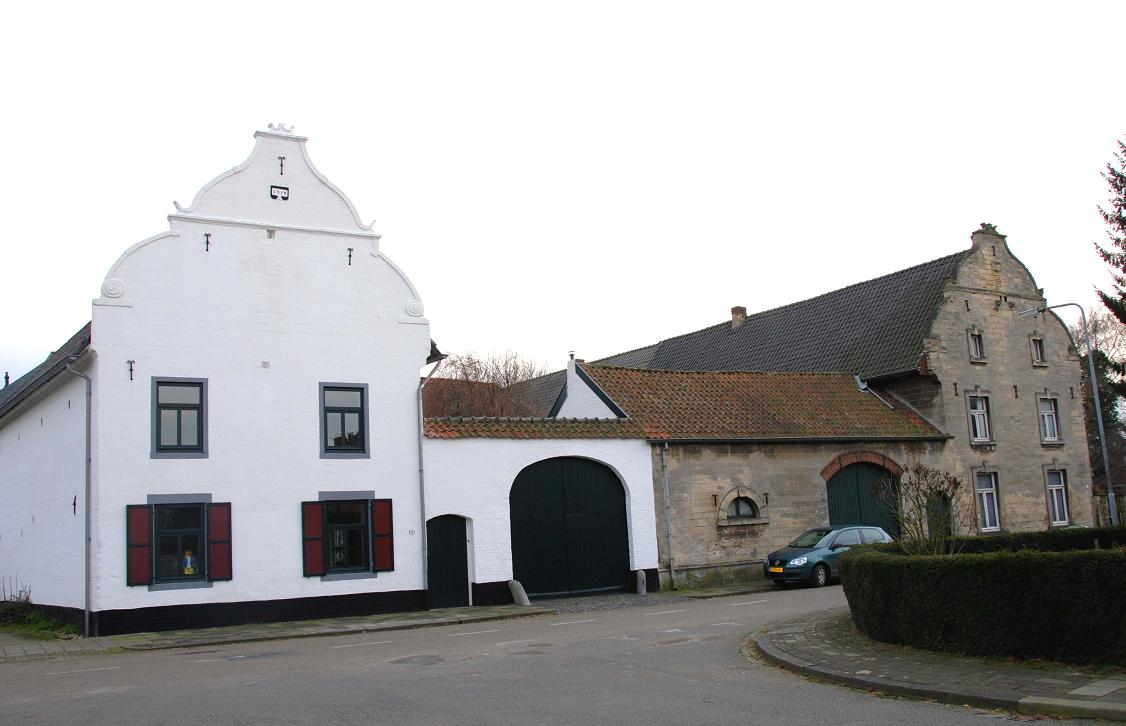
- Farm in Arensgenhout

- Location in the Netherlands Location in the province of Limburg in the Netherlands
- Coordinates: 50°53′20″N 5°50′28″E
- Country: Netherlands
- Province: Limburg
- Municipality: Beekdaelen

Area
  - Total: 1.39 km^{2} (0.54 sq mi)
- Elevation: 132 m (433 ft)

Population (2021)
  - Total: 515
  - Density: 371/km^{2} (960/sq mi)
- Time zone: UTC+1 (CET)
  - Summer (DST): UTC+2 (CEST)
- Postal code: 6336
- Dialing code: 045

Arensgenhout (Dutch: [ˈaːrənsxə(n)ɦʌut], Limburgish: [ˈaːʀənsxə(n)ɦɔwt]) is a hamlet in the Dutch province of Limburg. It is a part of the municipality of Beekdaelen, and lies about 8 km south of Geleen.

The hamlet was first mentioned in 1381 as "dat dorpe 't gene Hoit", and means "forest belonging to Arnold (person)".

Arensgehnout was home to 287 people in 1840. In 1850, the remains of the Roman villa Steenland were discovered.

The former monastery Ravensbos was built in 1885 with a school and boarding house and was intended as a seminary. It was sold in the late-20th century, and has a residential function.

== Gallery ==
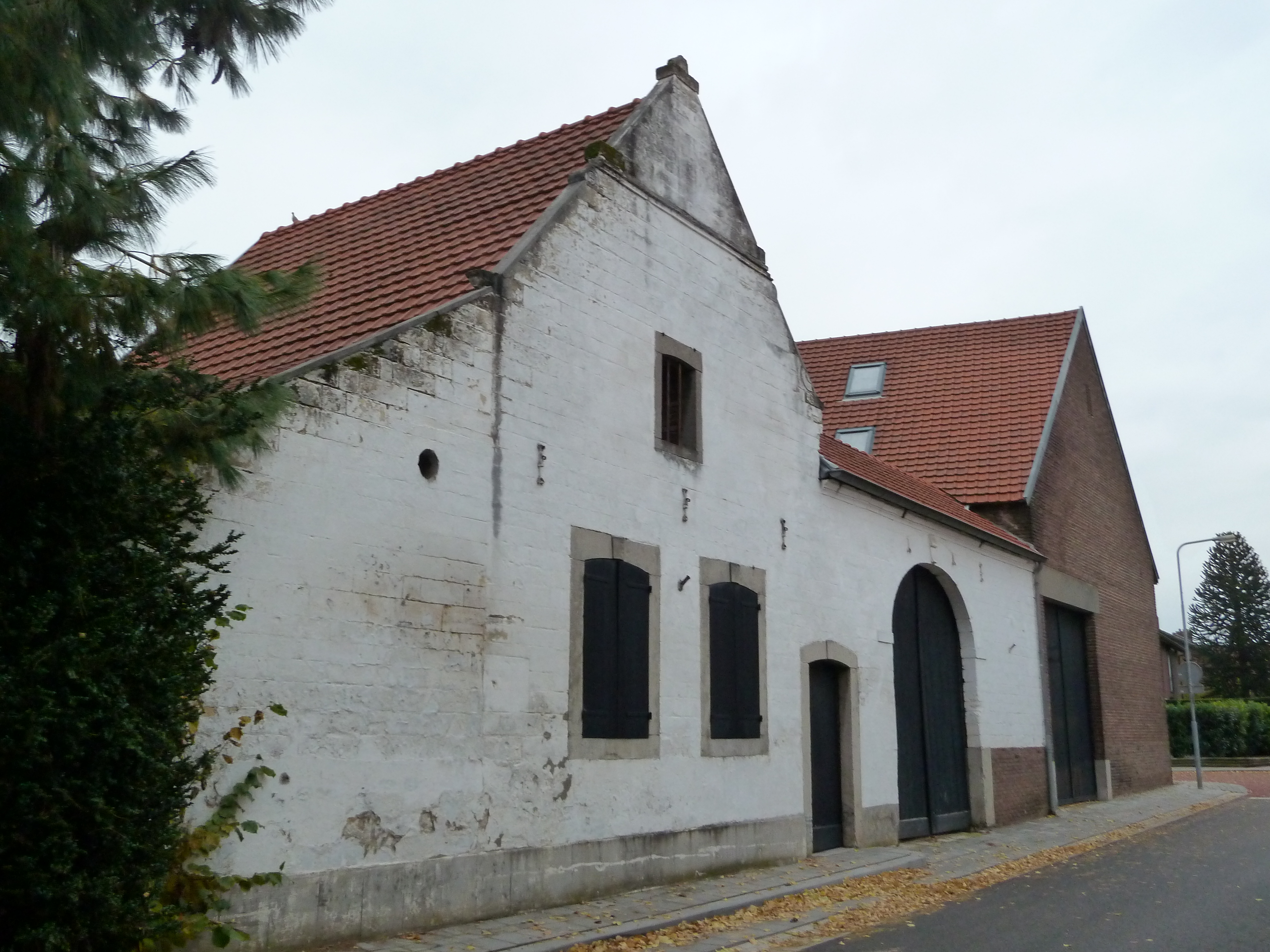
Building in Arensgenhout

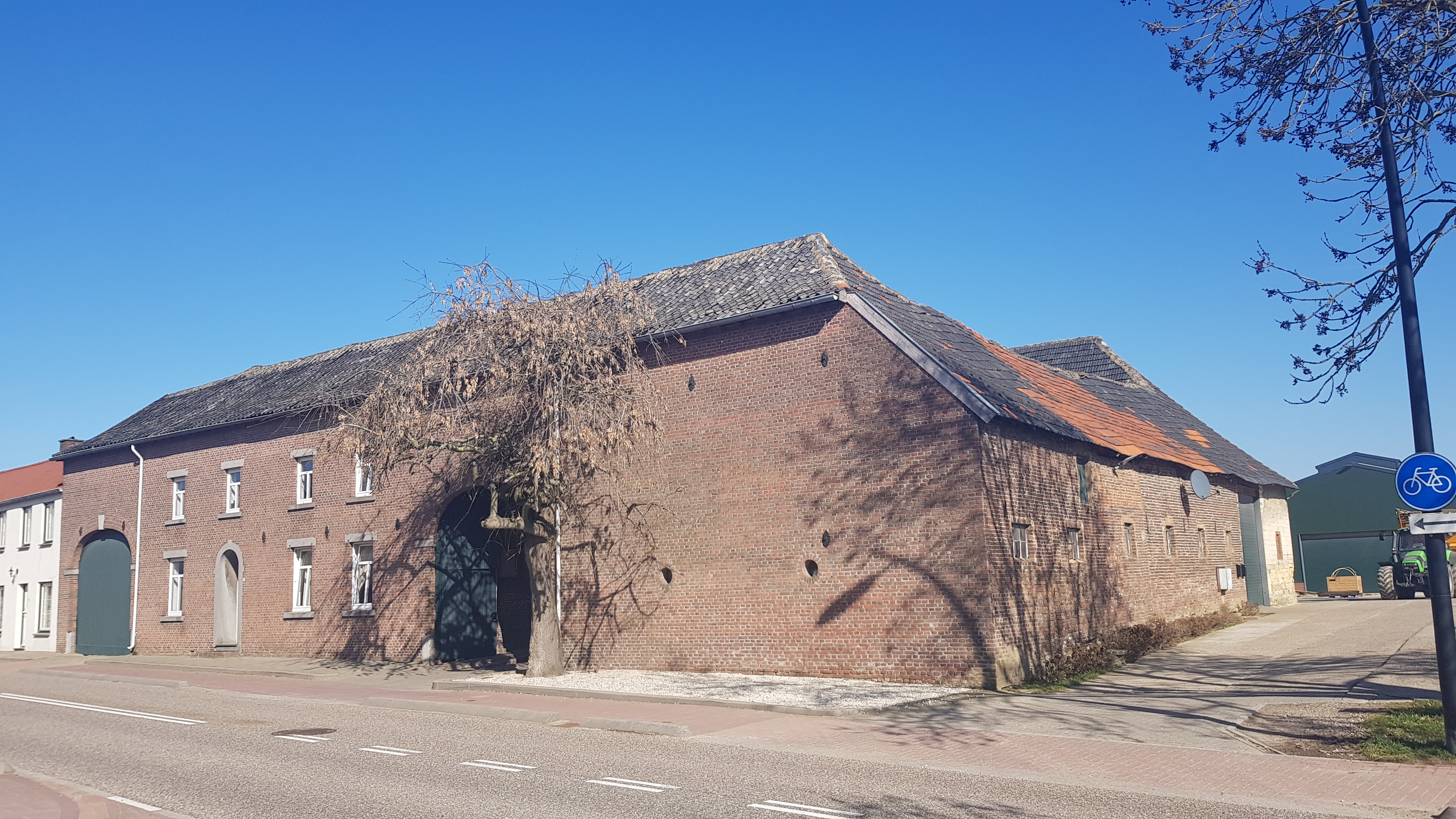
Farm in Arensgenhout

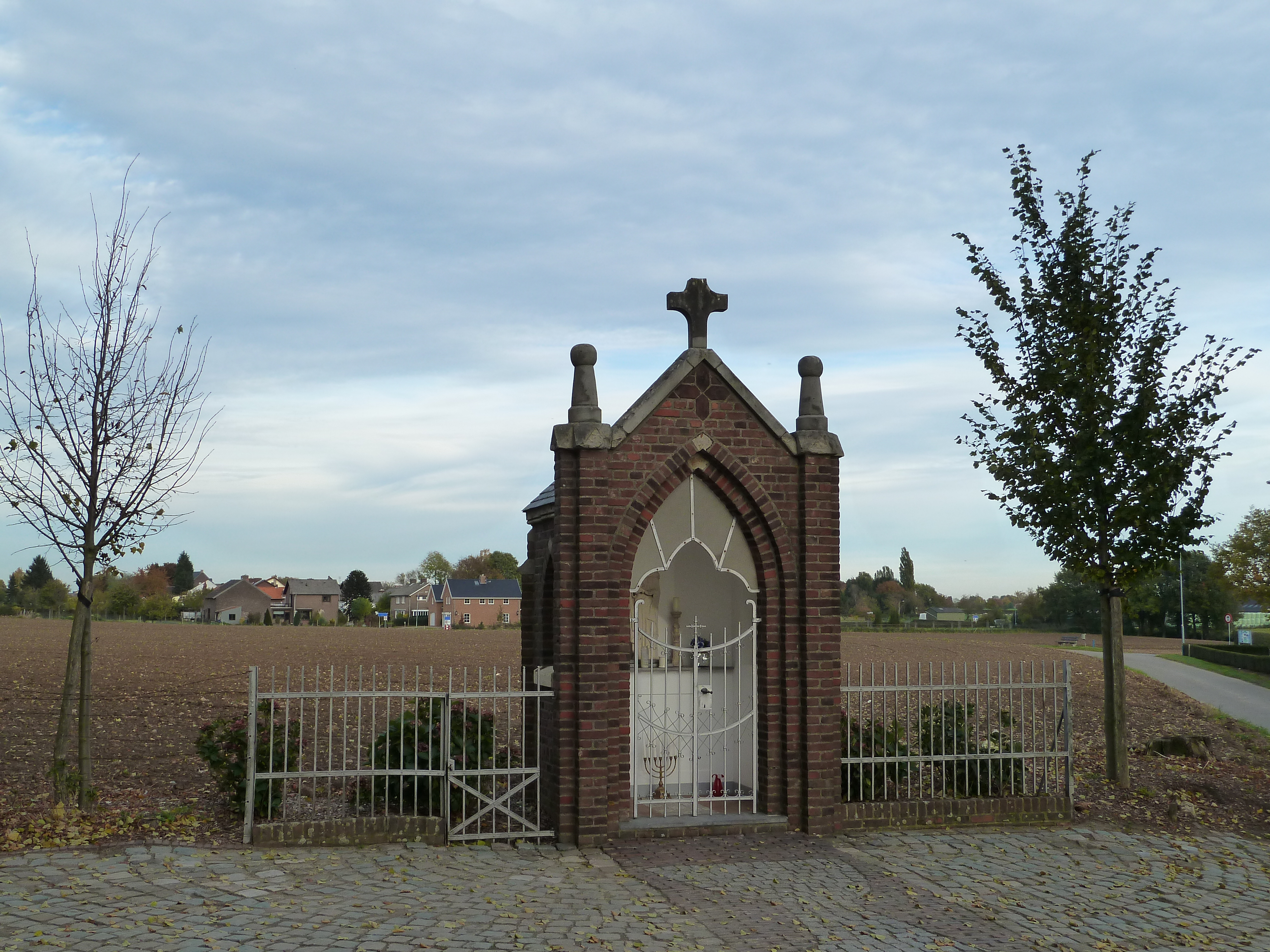
Mary chapel

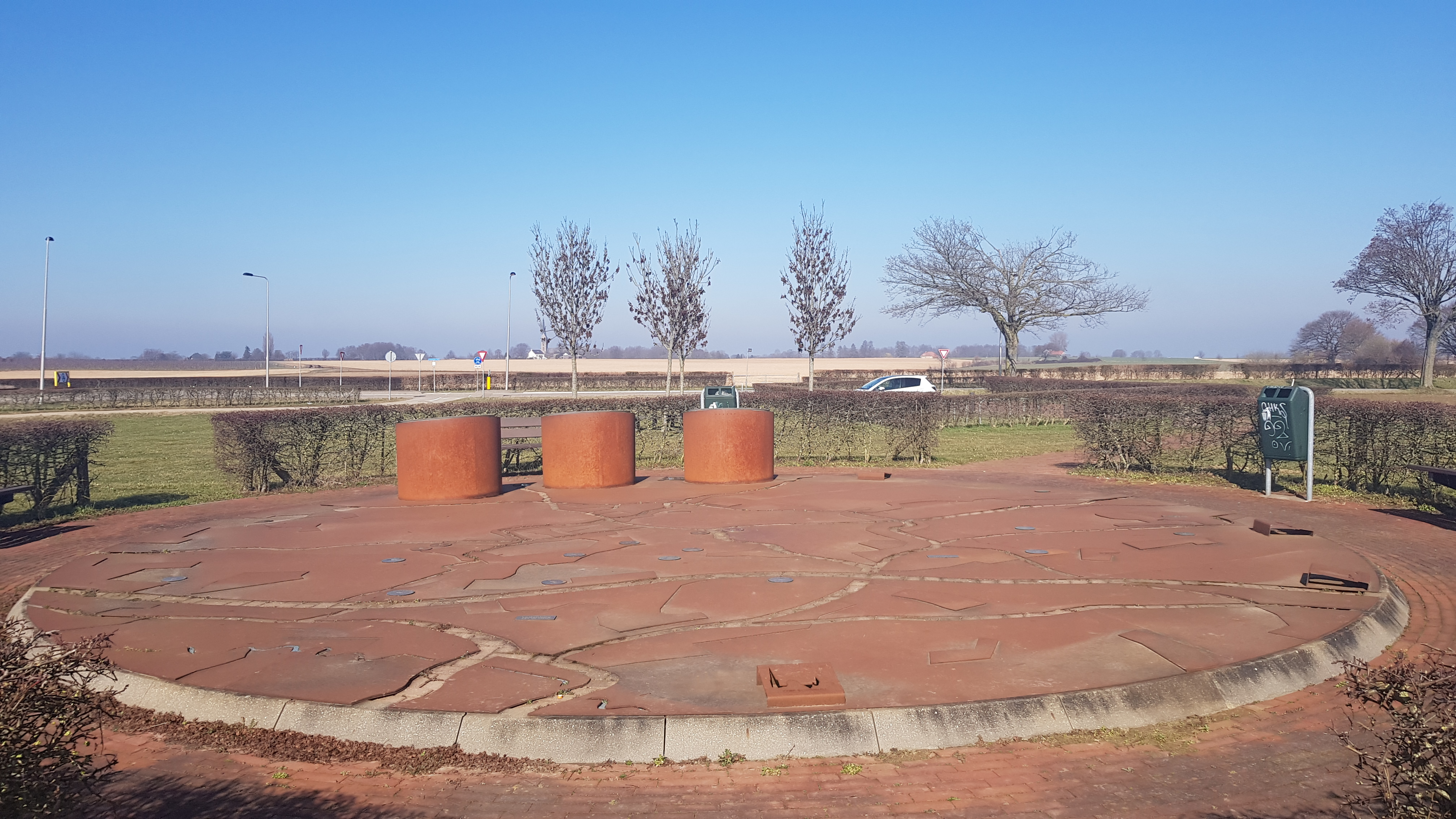
Former Roman villa Steenland
