= Grijzegrubben =

- Hamlet
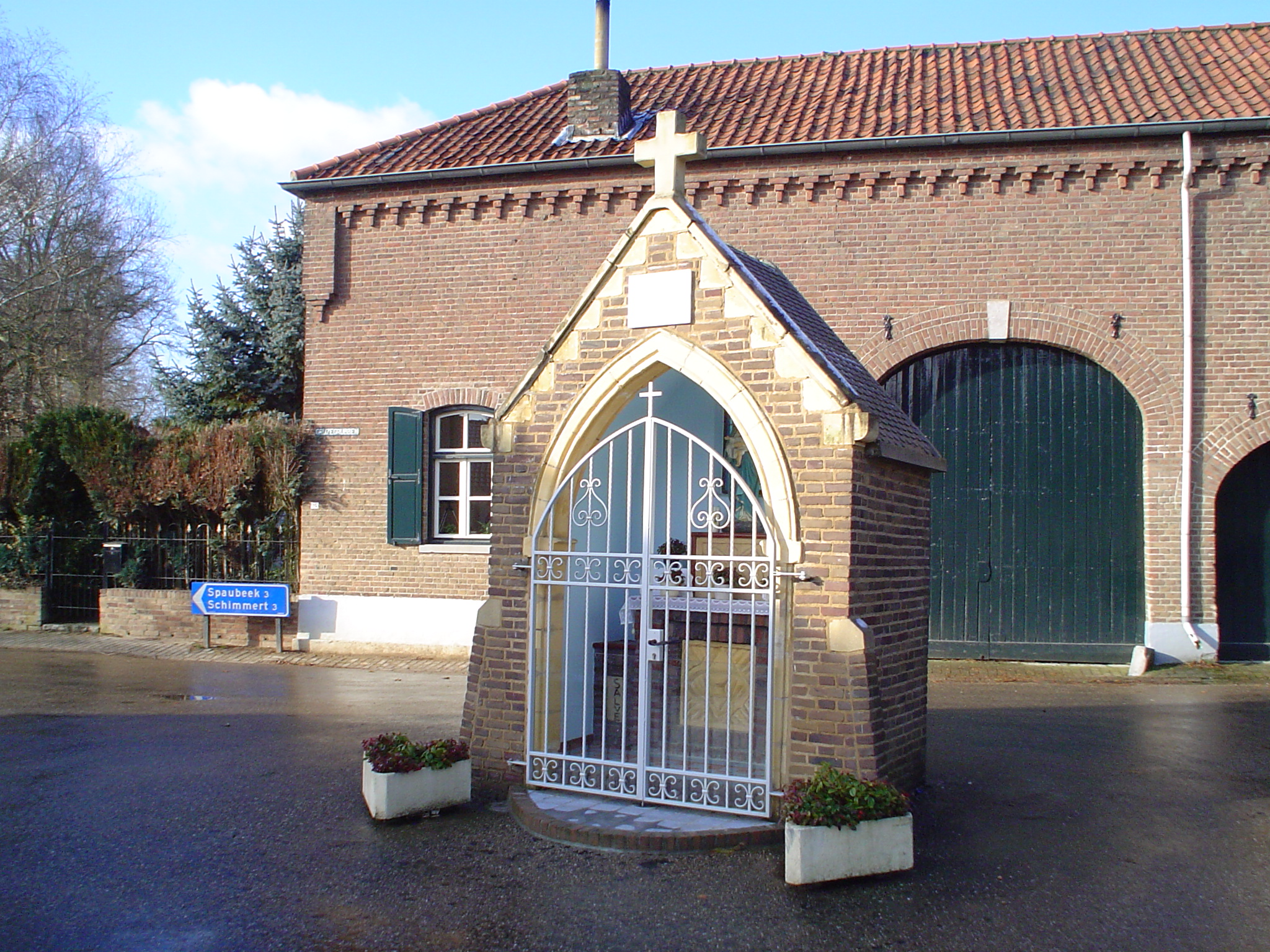
- The chapel of Grijzegrubben

- Location in the Netherlands Location in the province of Limburg in the Netherlands
- Country: Netherlands
- Province: Limburg
- Municipality: Beekdaelen
- Time zone: UTC+1 (CET)
  - Summer (DST): UTC+2 (CEST)
- Postal code: 6361
- Dialing code: 045

Grijzegrubben (Dutch pronunciation: [ˌɣrɛizəˈɣrʏbə(n)]; Limburgish: Griëzegröbbe [ˌɣʀiəzəˈɣʀœbə]) is a hamlet in the municipality of Beekdaelen in the province of Limburg, the Netherlands.

The name Grijzegrubben contains the toponym Grubbe, which in Limburg often refers to a hollow way. The name was already in use in the year 1637, when Aleidis of Grijzegrubben leased some land to the nobleman Bartholomeus van Reymersbeeck. Archeologists found in Grijzegrubben in August 2002 the remains of a Roman farm or storehouse, originating from approximately the 2nd century.

In September 1944, a tree with a Christian cross was accidentally destroyed by an American armoured car. Due to the cross and the preservation of Grijzegrubben during World War II, community members built a chapel at this spot in 1945. The chapel is still owned by the community.

Grijzegrubben has place name signs. It was home to 229 people in 1840. Nowadays, it consists of about 100 houses.

The Southern Limburg horse market has been held each year in Grijzegrubben since 2005.
