= Peter Frans Van Kerckhoven =

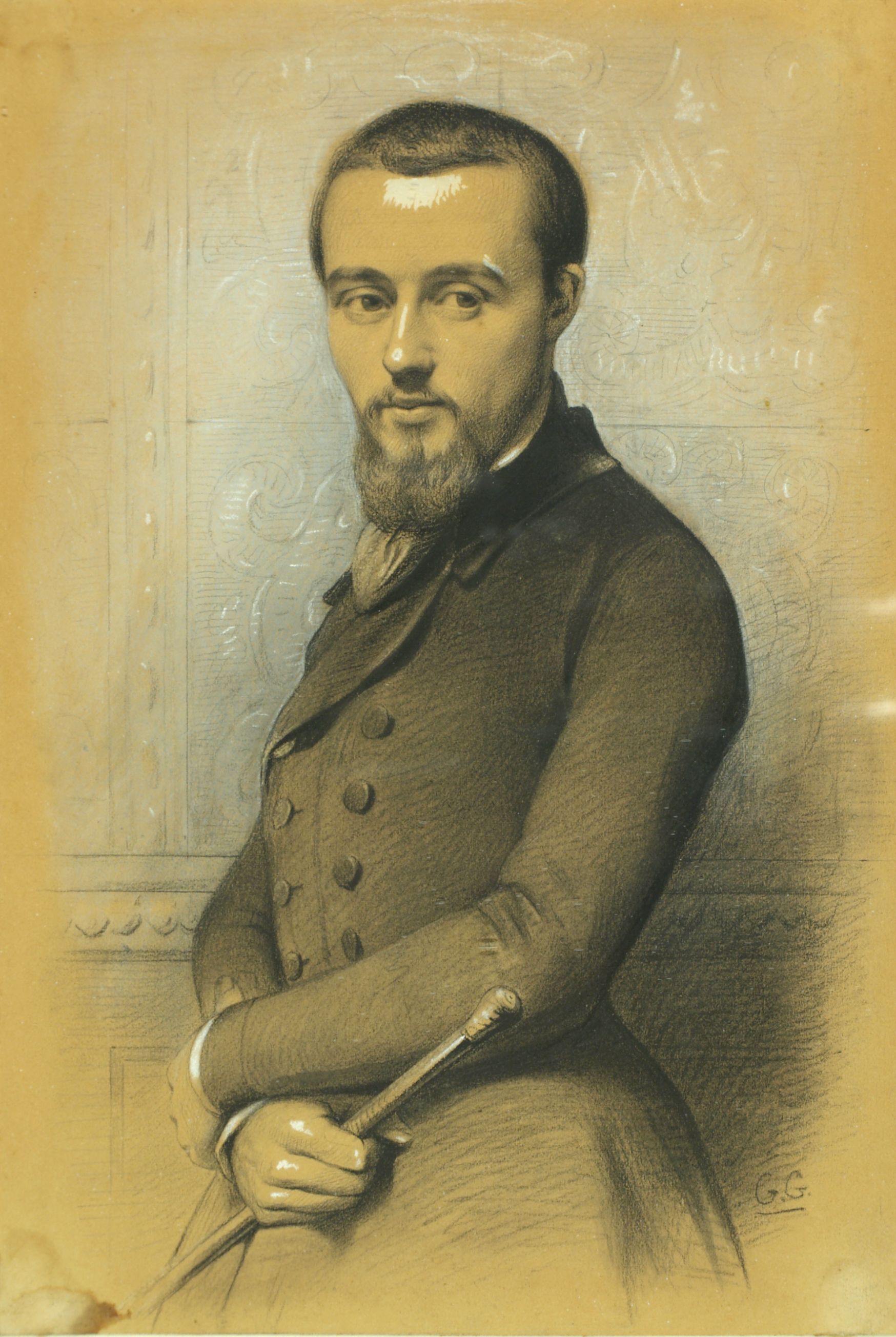
Peter Frans Van Kerckhoven

Pieter Frans van Kerckhoven (10 November 1818 in Antwerp – 1 August 1857 in Antwerp) was a Flemish writer and one of the leaders of the early Flemish movement. He was the son of a broker, and his well-off birth allowed him a decent education. After he had first been instructed in a private school, he passed through the Antwerp athenaeum together with his contemporary and friend Domien Sleeckx. Van Kerckhoven was in that period a tireless reader and spent almost his entire pocket money to buy books of the French traditional authors. During his youth, Van Kerckhoven was, just like the rest of its family, very religious. After Van Kerckhoven in 1836, graduated from the Antwerp athenaeum, he studied medicine in Italy, at the University of Bologna. In Italy, Van Kerckhoven witnessed the restless and rebellious Risorgimento. The confrontation with the liberal and anticlerical Risorgimento movement would determine his later progressive-liberal conviction. Van Kerckhoven evolved from a pious catholic to an enthusiastic and persuaded liberal. In spite of the personal change which Van Kerckhoven underwent in Italy, he remained, however, religious.

Van Kerckhoven obtained the degree of baccalaurean in medicine and philosophy, but in June 1838 he suddenly returned to Antwerp, without finishing his studies. It is commonly believed that in Bologna it became too warm under the feet of Van Kerckhoven, after compromising contacts with the clandestine Carbonari movement. In Antwerp he would continue his medical studies at the Elisabeth hospital, but he would give them up quite rapidly. During that training he got acquainted, as it happens, with the students Jan De Laet and Hendrik Conscience, who almost immediately recognized his artistic talent and introduced him to the romantic artist group of the city. Already rapidly Van Kerckhoven would turn out to be himself one the central characters of the Antwerp cultural scene. Beside his office career (first in the business of his father and later at the city administration) he was now very active as an artist, literature critic and as head editor of several illustrated magazines, among which the Noordstar and the Vlaemsche Rederyker. Van Kerckhoven was also a member of literary societes of a private character, such as De Hermans, Het Heilig Verbond en De Olijftak. As a novelist he was not as popular as Hendrik Conscience, but nevertheless he was quite successful as an author and enjoyed as a lot of appreciation as a literature critic.

Reciprocal envy and Van Kerckhovens strive to make the Flemish movement more liberal, led as from 1846 to a split with Hendrik Conscience, who saw more in the alignment of the Flemish movement to the catholic politicians. The conflict escalated fast and it became, in 1847, a bitter feud which was fought out in the Antwerp magazines De Roskam en De Schrobber. In the leaflet De Vlaemsche Beweging (1847), aimed against Conscience and his allies, Van Kerckhoven displayed his brio as a polemist.

In these years it went well for Van Kerckhoven as he became a city clerk and published with Ziel en lichaem (1848) and the novel Liefde (1851) the pinnacle of his literary oeuvre. Moreover, he tirelessly contributes to the Vlaemsche Rederyker, a literature-critical illustrated magazine, of which he had been head editor since 1847. In 1852, Van Kerckhoven was even raised to knight in the Leopold order. however at the beginning of 1857 he became seriously ill. He appeared to suffer from tuberculosis and died some months later, aged 38.

== Bibliography ==
- Gozewijn, graef van Strijen (1841)
- Jaek of een arm huisgezin (1842)
- De koopmansklerk (1843)
- Daniël (1845)
- Gedichten en balladen (1846)
- De Vlaemsche Beweging (1847)
- Richilde (1847)
- Ziel en lichaem (1848)
- Liefde (1851) - published again in 1971 by Hubert Lampo.
- Boer en edel (1853)
- De dronkaerd (1854)
- Twee goddeloozen (1857)

== See also ==
- Flemish literature

== Sources ==
- Lode Baekelmans, Vier Vlaamsche prozaschrijvers, Antwerpen, 1931.
- Contactgroep 19de eeuw. Dr. F. A. Snellaertcomité, Vierde colloquium: Pieter Frans Van Kerckhoven, 1818–1857, Antwerpen, 1989.
- Ada Deprez ed., Hoofdstukken uit de geschiedenis van de Vlaamse letterkunde in de negentiende eeuw (Studies op het gebied van de moderne Nederlandse literatuur, nr. 1-4-6), 3 vol., Gent, 1999.
- Gobbers, Walter, 'Kerckhoven, Pieter F. van', in: Nieuwe Encyclopedie van de Vlaamse Beweging, II, Tielt, 1998, 1684–1685.
- Sleeckx, D., Indrukken en ervaringen, L. Simons ed. (Herdrukken uit de Zuidnederlandse Letterkunde), Beveren, 1982.
- Van Kerckhoven, P. F., Liefde 1843, een liefdesroman in briefvorm, H. Lampo ed., Antwerpen, 1971.
