= Robert Van Kerkhoven =

Belgian footballer

- Van Kerkhoven in 1960

Personal information
- Date of birth: 1 October 1924
- Place of birth: Belgium
- Date of death: 18 June 2017 (aged 92)
- Position: Midfielder

Senior career*
| Years | Team | Apps | (Gls) |
| 1949–1963 | Daring Club Bruxelles | | |

International career
| 1951–1956 | Belgium | 9 | (1) |
- * Club domestic league appearances and goals

Robert Van Kerkhoven (1 October 1924 – 18 June 2017) was a Belgian international footballer who played as a midfielder.

== Career ==
Van Kerkhoven played club football for Daring Club Bruxelles.

He earned a total of nine caps for Belgium between 1951 and 1956, and participated at the 1954 FIFA World Cup. Van Kerkhoven died in June 2017 at the age of 92. His death wasn't reported until more than two years later.

== Honours ==
R. Daring Club Molenbeek

- Belgian Second Division: 1949–50, 1954–55
