= Terstraten =

- Hamlet
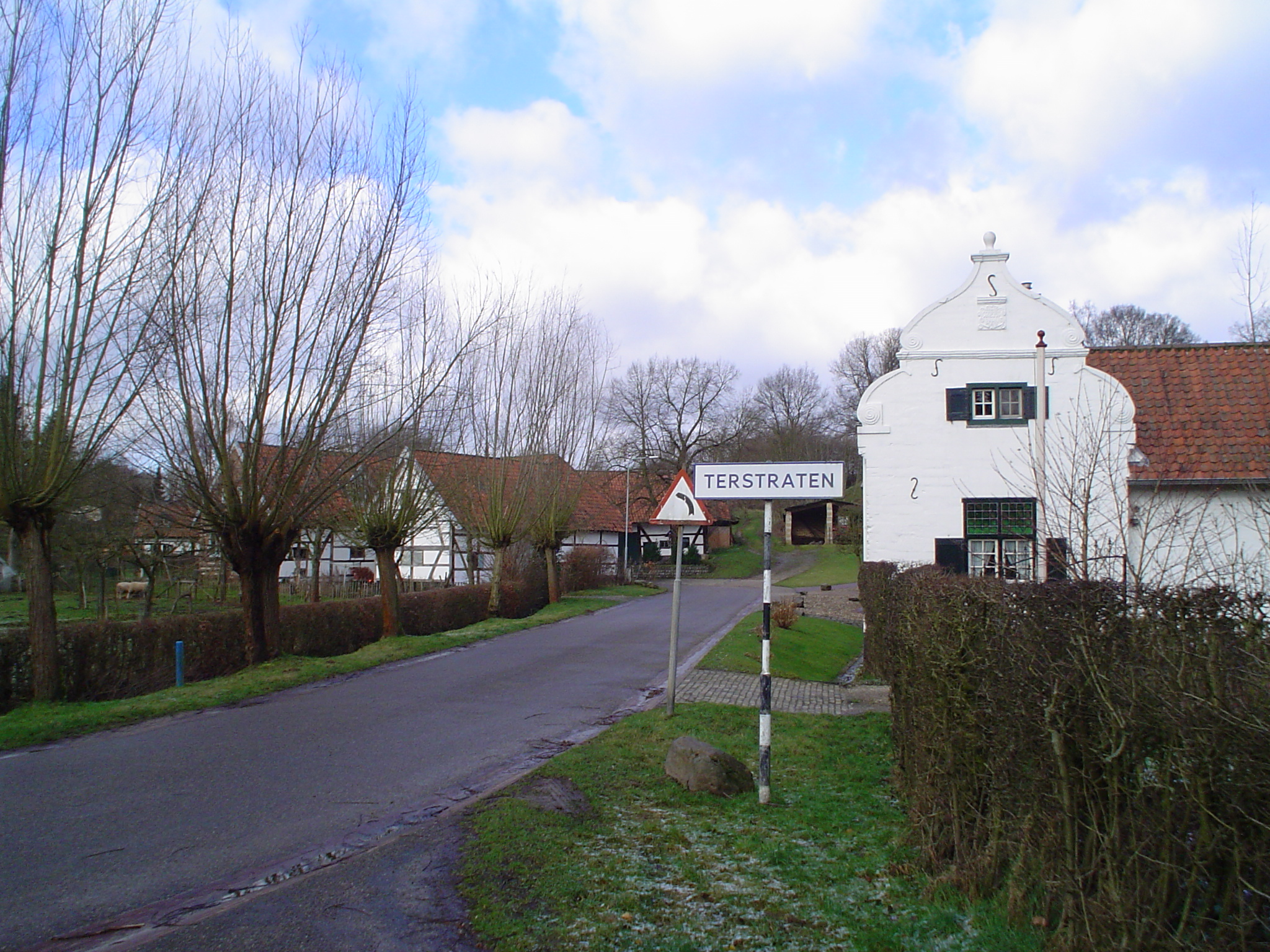
- Terstraten; view from the south

- Location in the Netherlands Location in the province of Limburg in the Netherlands
- Coordinates: 50°54′50″N 5°51′35″E
- Country: Netherlands
- Province: Limburg
- Municipality: Beekdaelen
- Time zone: UTC+1 (CET)
  - Summer (DST): UTC+2 (CEST)
- Postal code: 6361
- Dialing code: 045

Terstraten (Dutch pronunciation: [tɛrˈstraːtə(n)]; Limburgish: Tersjtraote [tæʀˈʃtʀɔːtə]) is a hamlet in the municipality of Beekdaelen in the province of Limburg, the Netherlands. It is one of the so-called Bovengehuchten, or Upper Hamlets, of Beekdaelen. All the houses are situated along the street Terstraten, which runs from the neighboring hamlet Brand via a hollow way towards the Maastrichterweg. In between the houses is a little square with a Christian cross underneath a tree. The houses in Terstraten are officially preserved heritage. The hamlet is known as a painters' paradise, due to the many 18th-century farmhouses with timber framing. Between Terstraten and the hamlet Brand runs the stream Platsbeek.

Terstraten was place name signs. In 1840, Terstraten and neighbouring Helle were home to 180 people. Nowadays, it consists of about 30 houses.
