= Doenrade =

- Village
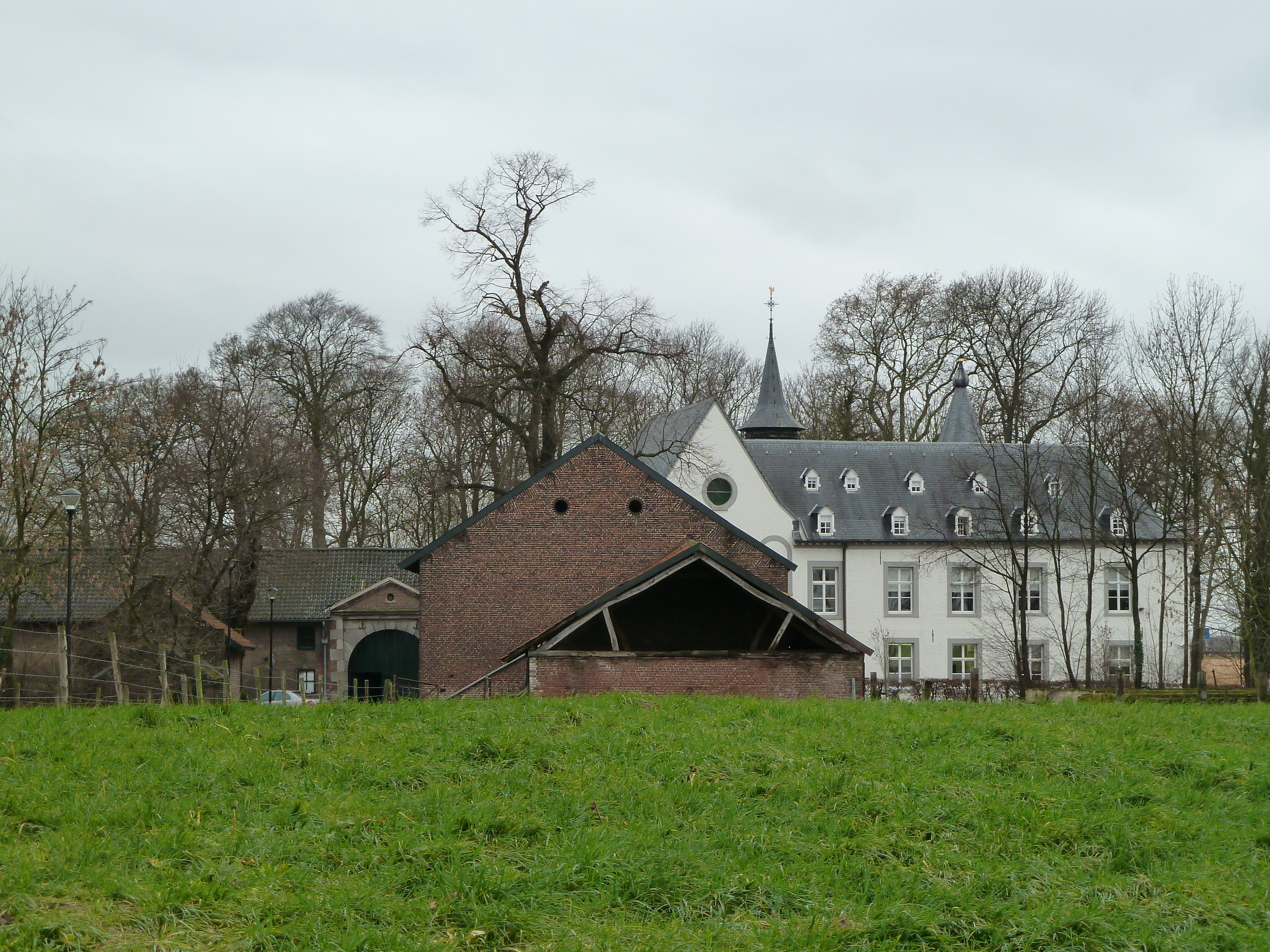
- Doenrade Castle

- Location in the Netherlands Location in the province of Limburg in the Netherlands
- Coordinates: 50°58′4″N 5°54′31″E
- Country: Netherlands
- Province: Limburg
- Municipality: Beekdaelen

Area
  - Total: 4.67 km^{2} (1.80 sq mi)
- Elevation: 109 m (358 ft)

Population (2021)
  - Total: 1,255
  - Density: 269/km^{2} (696/sq mi)
- Time zone: UTC+1 (CET)
  - Summer (DST): UTC+2 (CEST)
- Postal code: 6438 & 6439
- Dialing code: 046

Doenrade is a village in the southern Dutch province of Limburg. Historically, its name has also been spelled Dudenrode and Doenradt and was along a main trade route between Germany and southern Limburg. Until 1982 it was a part of the municipality of Oirsbeek but was transferred to the municipality of Schinnen. In 2019 that municipality merged with Onderbanken and Nuth to form Beekdaelen. It lies about 4 km southeast of Sittard and borders the town of Hillensberg to the north.

In 2010, Doenrade had 1,135 inhabitants. The area of the town is 4.6 km², and contained 460 households.

Doenrade Castle, which was built around 1117, is situated on the edge of the town and is a popular place to stay for tourists visiting Limburg as it has been turned into a hotel and restaurant. The towns rolling hills, bucolic pastureland, and historic buildings make it seem to visitors that they've stepped back in time.

== Gallery ==
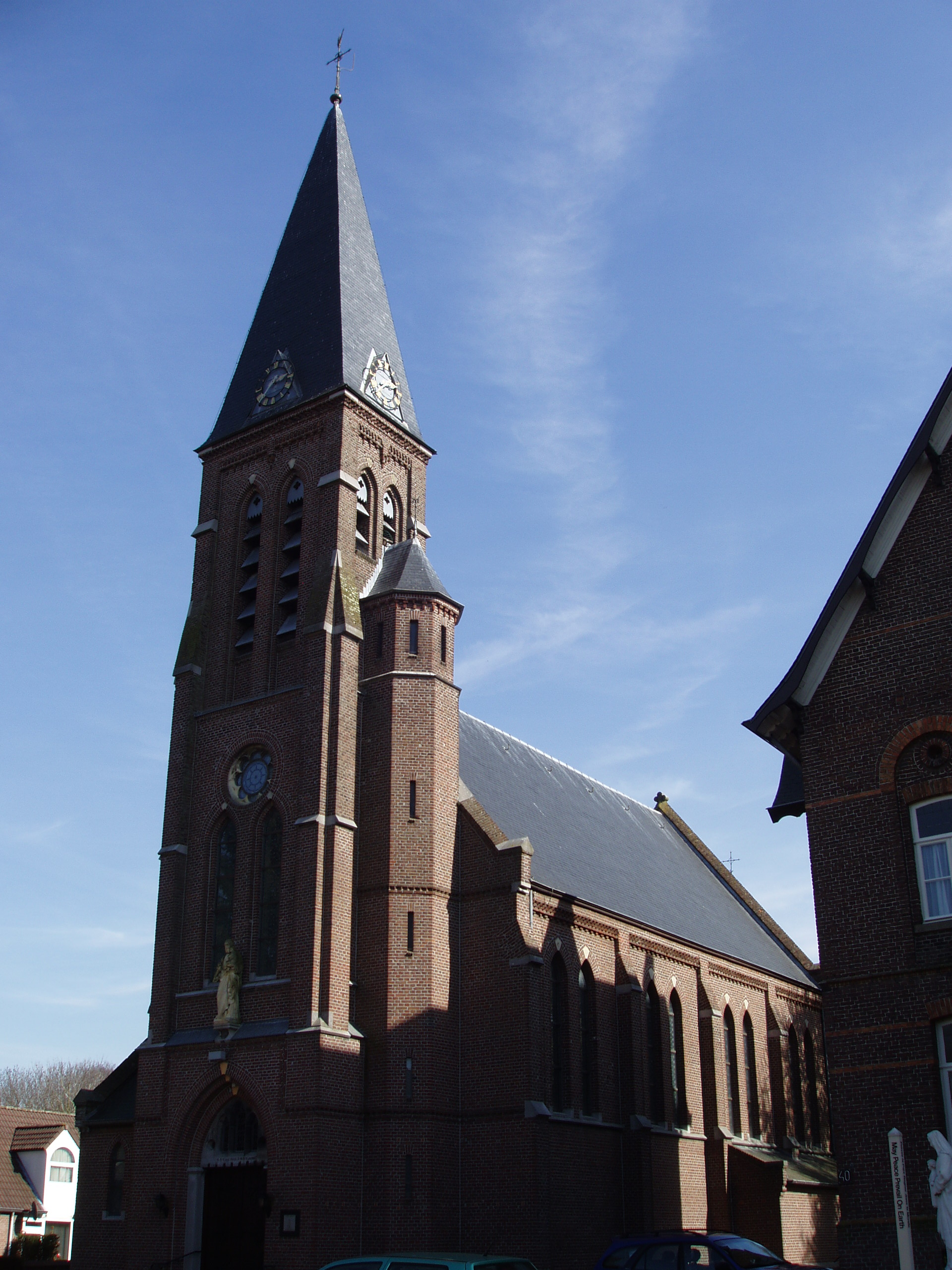
St Josef Church

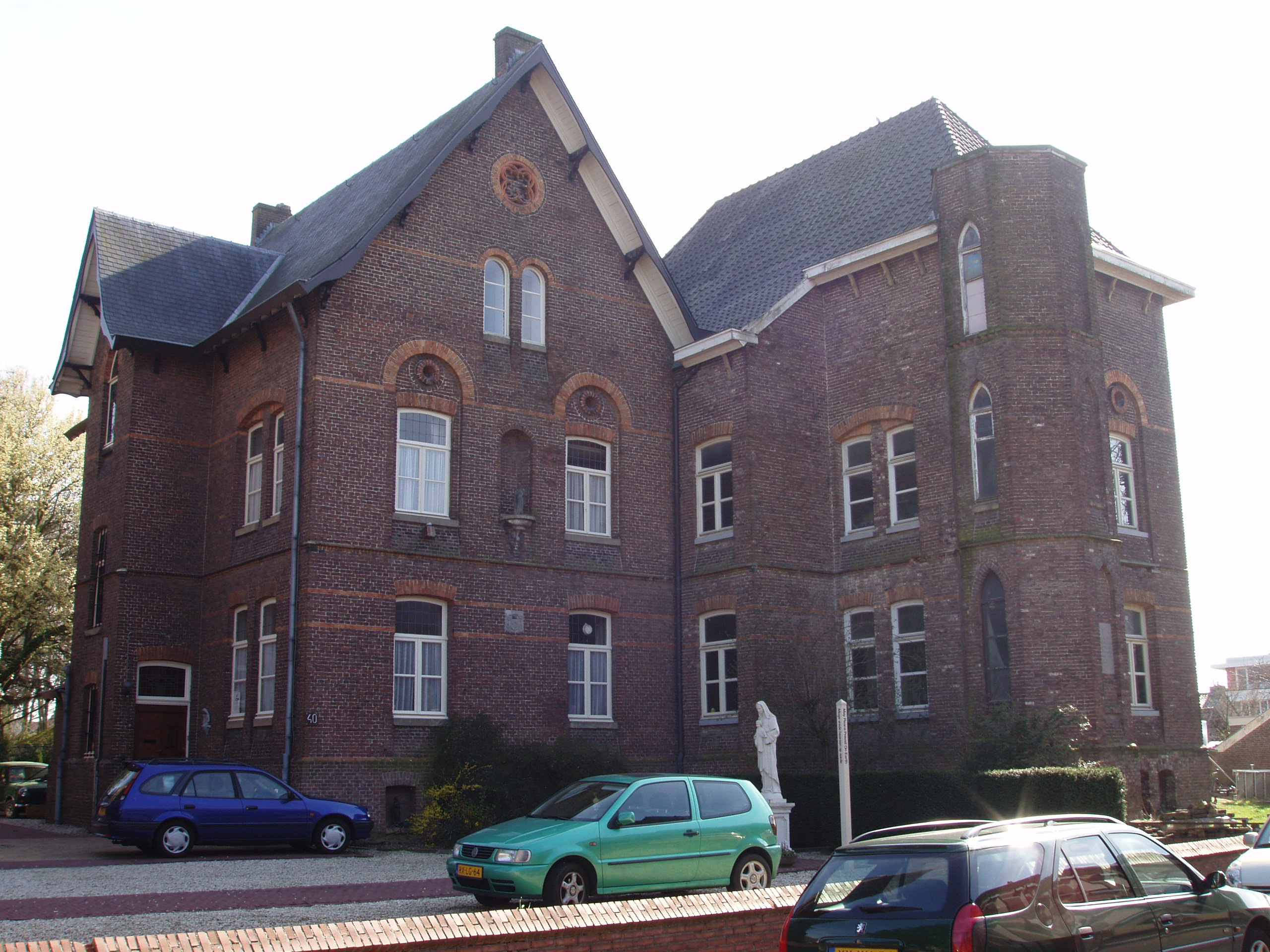
Vicar residence

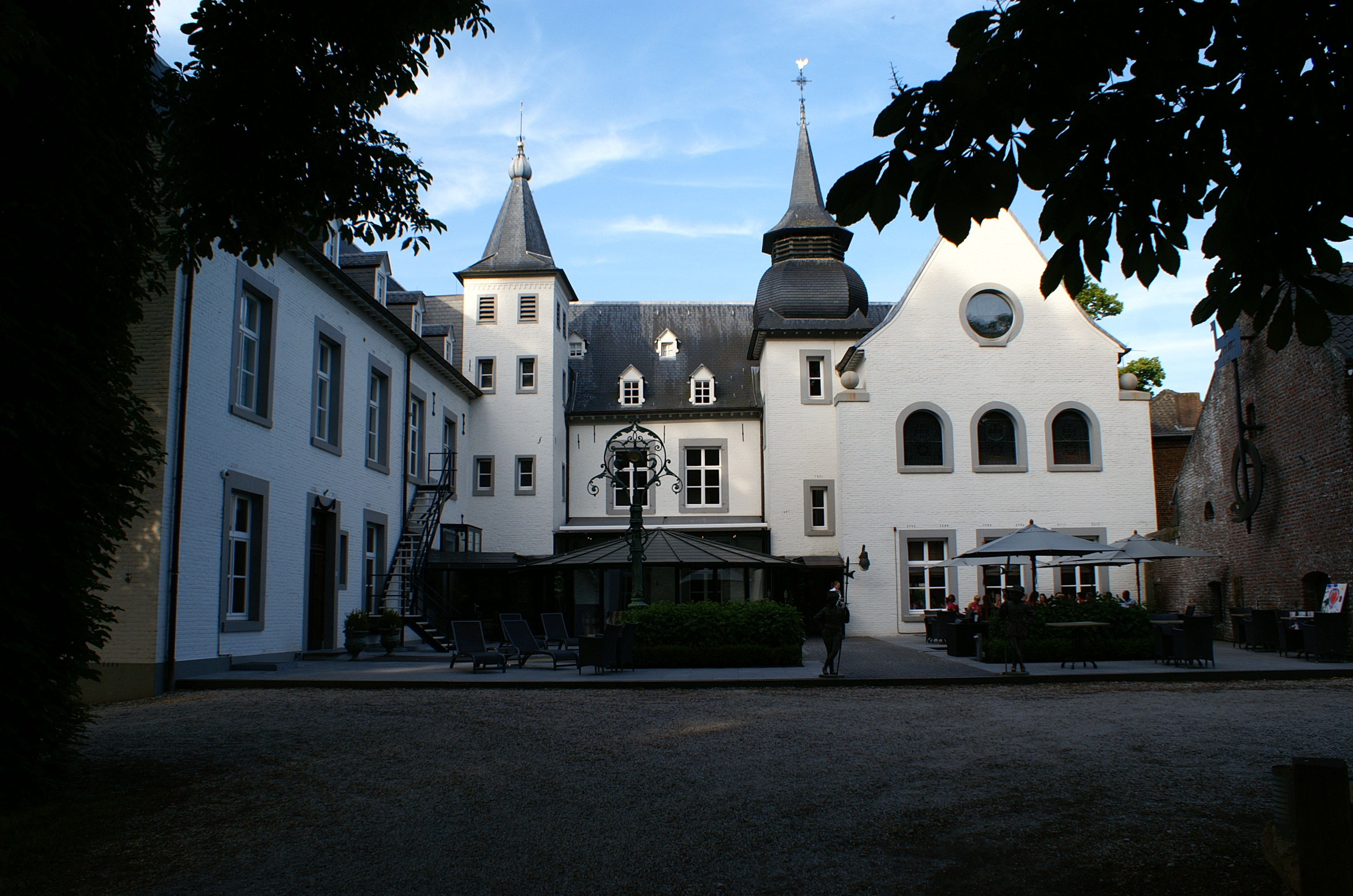
Doenrade Castle

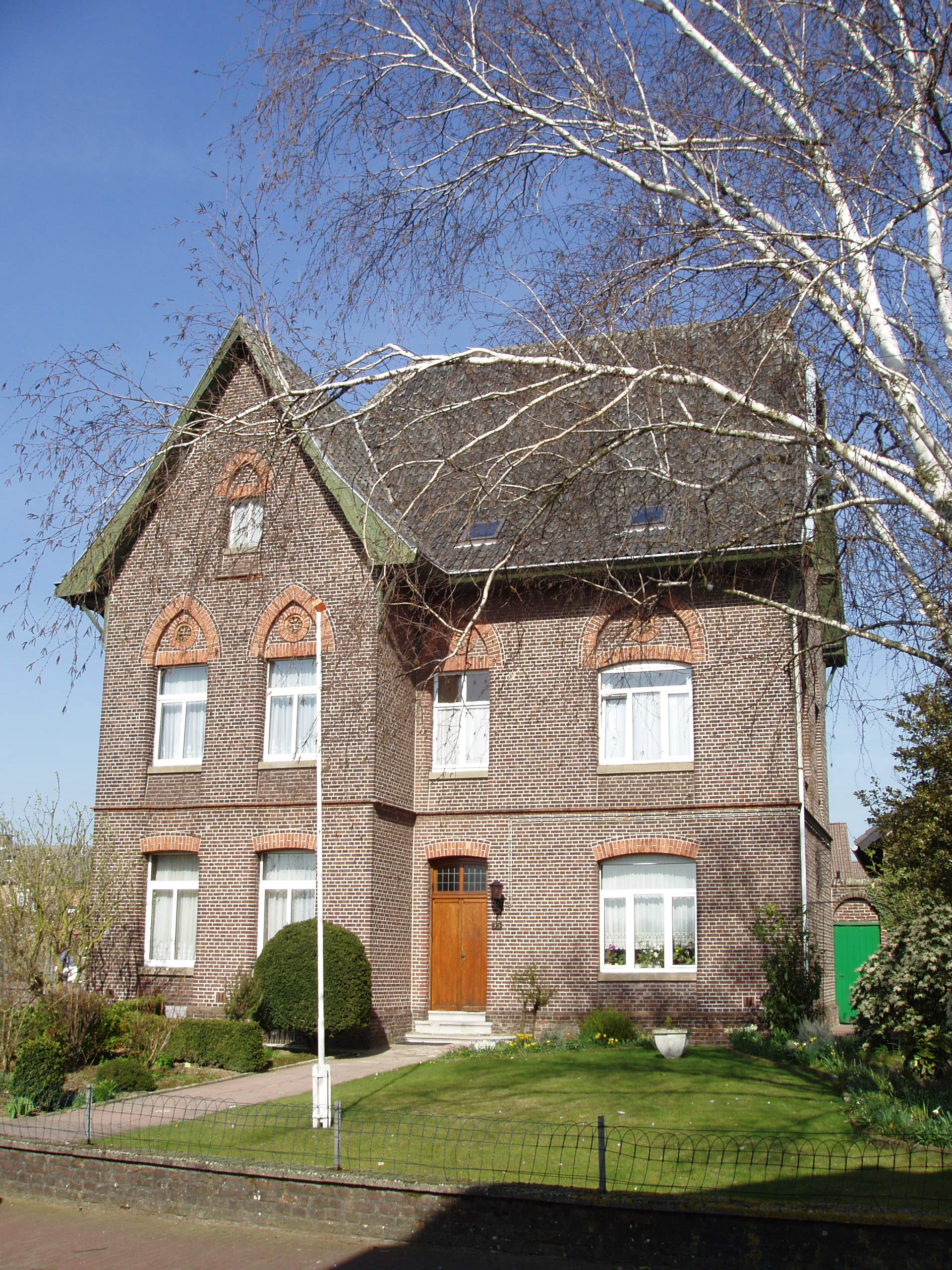
House in Doenrade
