= Chantal Nijkerken-de Haan =

Dutch politician

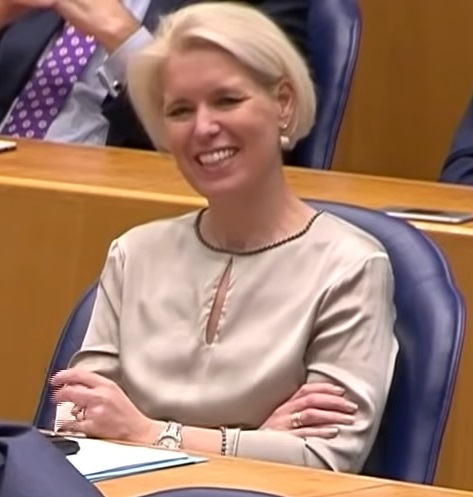

Member of the House of Representatives of the Netherlands
- In office 31 March 2015 – 31 March 2021

Personal details
- Born: 18 September 1973 (age 53) Rijswijk, Netherlands
- Party: People's Party for Freedom and Democracy
- Education: The Hague University of Applied Sciences

Chantal Nijkerken-de Haan (born 18 September 1973) is a Dutch politician, she has been a member of the House of Representatives of the Netherlands for the People's Party for Freedom and Democracy since 31 March 2015, when she replaced Klaas Dijkhoff who took up a position as State Secretary in the cabinet. Previously she was alderman in Onderbanken between 2010 and 2012 and in Meerssen between 2013 and 2014.

== Career ==
Nijkerken-de Haan studied policy, governance and management at The Hague University of Applied Sciences. She worked as a staff and freelance advisor at the Academic Hospital Maastricht between 2000 and 2010.

Nijkerken-de Haan became member of the People's Party for Freedom and Democracy in 2009. Between April 2010 and April 2012 she was alderman in Onderbanken. She left as alderman when the local coalition with the Christian Democratic Appeal broke down. In May 2013 she took up the same position in Meerssen, where she left after the municipal elections of 2014.

In the parliamentary elections of 2012 Nijkerken-de Haan occupied place 52 on the candidate list of the People's Party for Freedom and Democracy. On 31 March 2015 she entered the House of Representatives of the Netherlands when she replaced Klaas Dijkhoff who took up a position as State Secretary in the cabinet.
