= Schinveld =

- Village
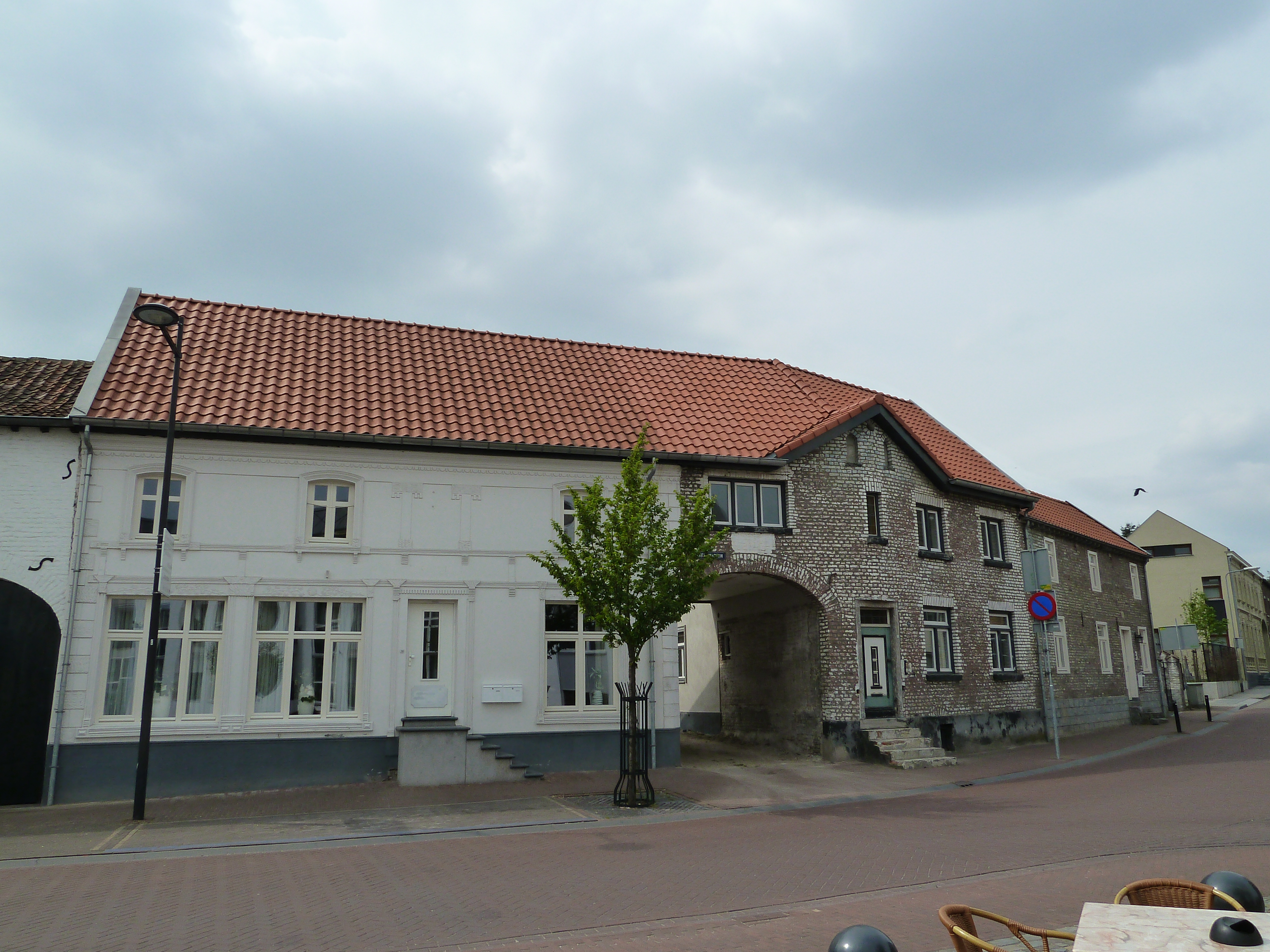
- Buildings in Schinveld

- Coat of arms

- Location in the Netherlands Location in the province of Limburg in the Netherlands
- Coordinates: 50°58′N 5°59′E
- Country: Netherlands
- Province: Limburg
- Municipality: Beekdaelen

Area
  - Total: 2.79 km^{2} (1.08 sq mi)
- Elevation: 62 m (203 ft)

Population (2021)
  - Total: 4,570
  - Density: 1,640/km^{2} (4,240/sq mi)
- Time zone: UTC+1 (CET)
  - Summer (DST): UTC+2 (CEST)
- Postal code: 6451
- Dialing code: 045
- Website: beekdaelen.nl

Schinveld (Limburgish: Sjilvend) is a village in the Dutch province of Limburg. It is located in the municipality of Beekdaelen.

== History ==
The village was first mentioned in 1180 as "in uilla Schinneuelt". The etymology is unclear. Schinveld developed in the Late Middle Ages at the intersection of roads. In the early-20th century, it became a mining town.

The Catholic St Eligius church is a basilica-like church in Gothic Revival style with a large tower which was built in 1889 and 1890. The tower from around 1500 was completed and enlarged in 1902. Huize Heijenhoven is an estate enclosed with a moat from the late-14th century which received its current shape around 1753. In the 19th century, it was converted into a farm. Between 1976 and 1985, it was restored and converted into a restaurant.

Schinveld was home to 828 people in 1840. In 1869, the border with Prussia was redrawn. It lost an area of 31 hectares, but gained 32 hectares. Both parts were uninhabited. In 1858, the remains of a Roman army camp were discovered.

Schinveld was a separate municipality until 1982, when it became a part of Onderbanken, and served as its capital. In 2019, it was merged into Beekdaelen.

== Gallery ==
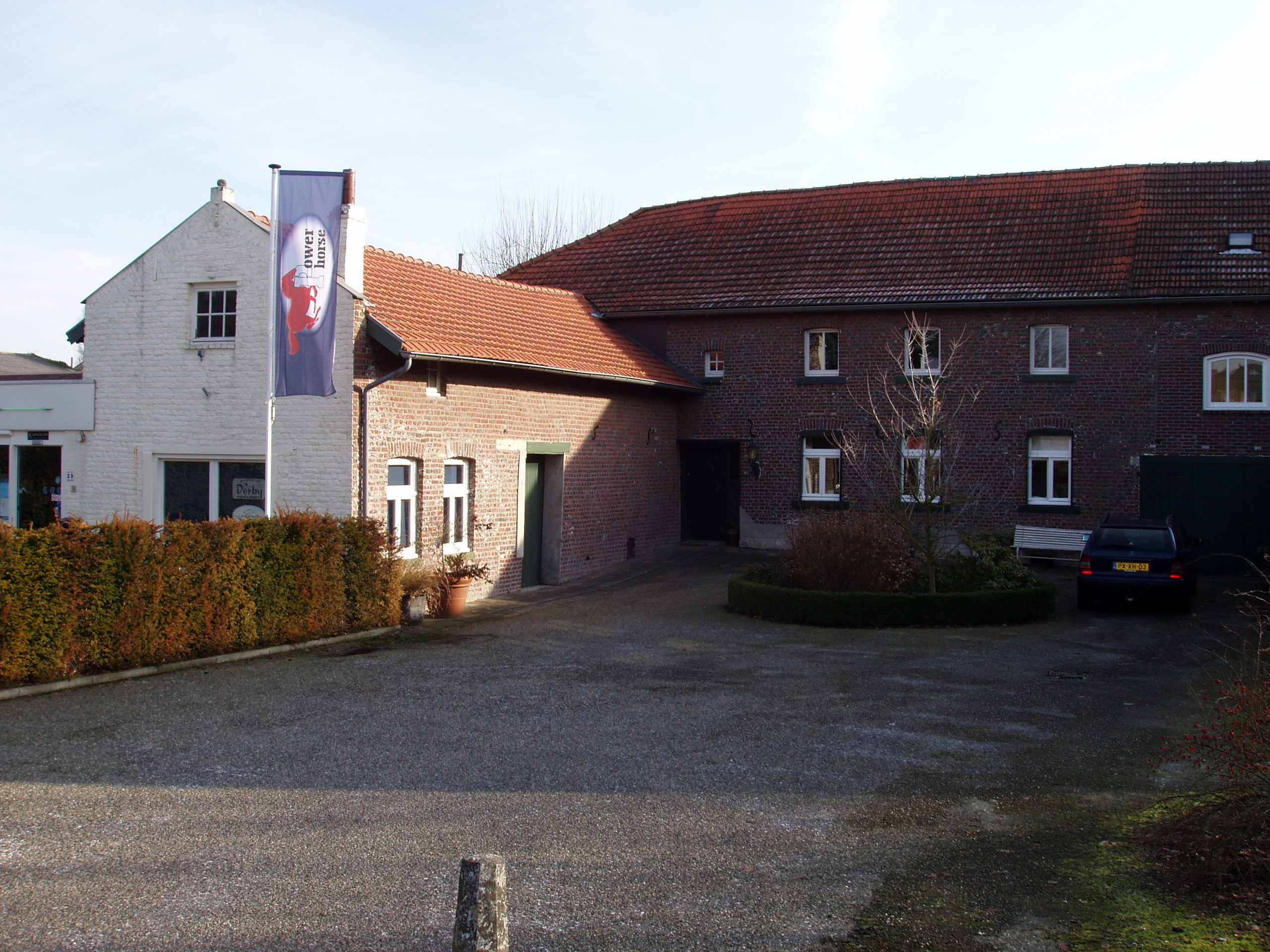
Watermill Onderste Molen

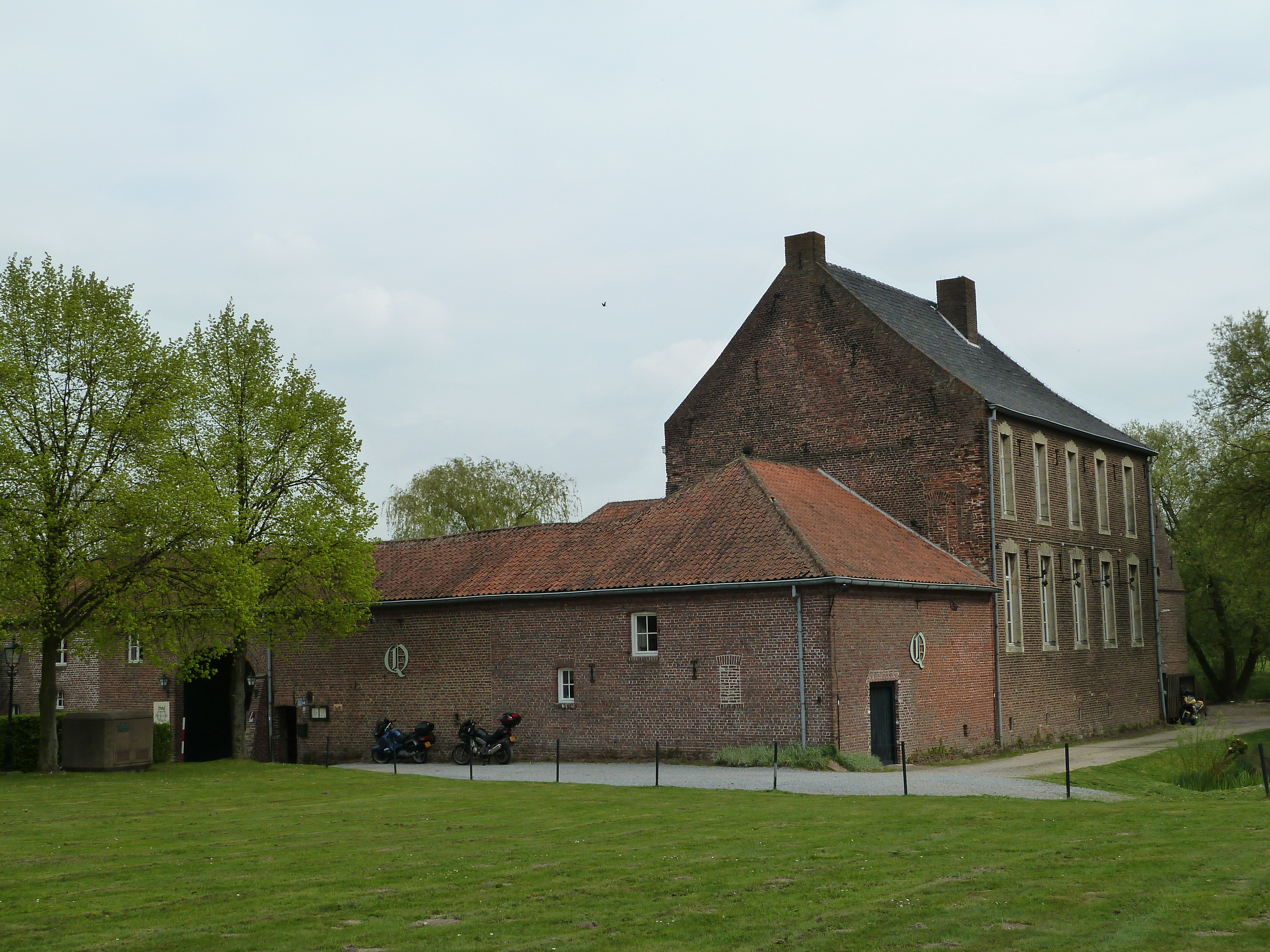
Farm in Schinveld

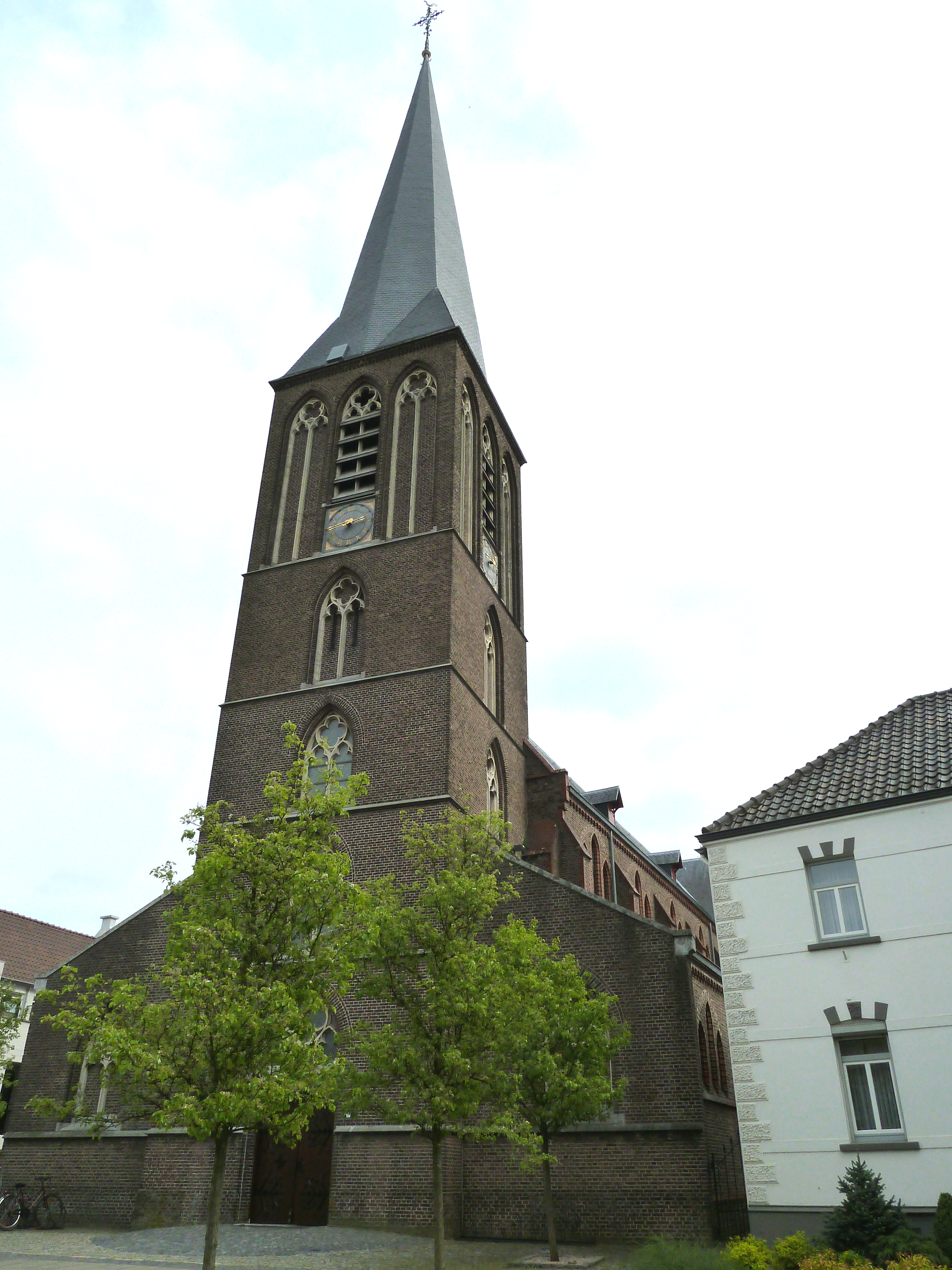
St Egilius Church

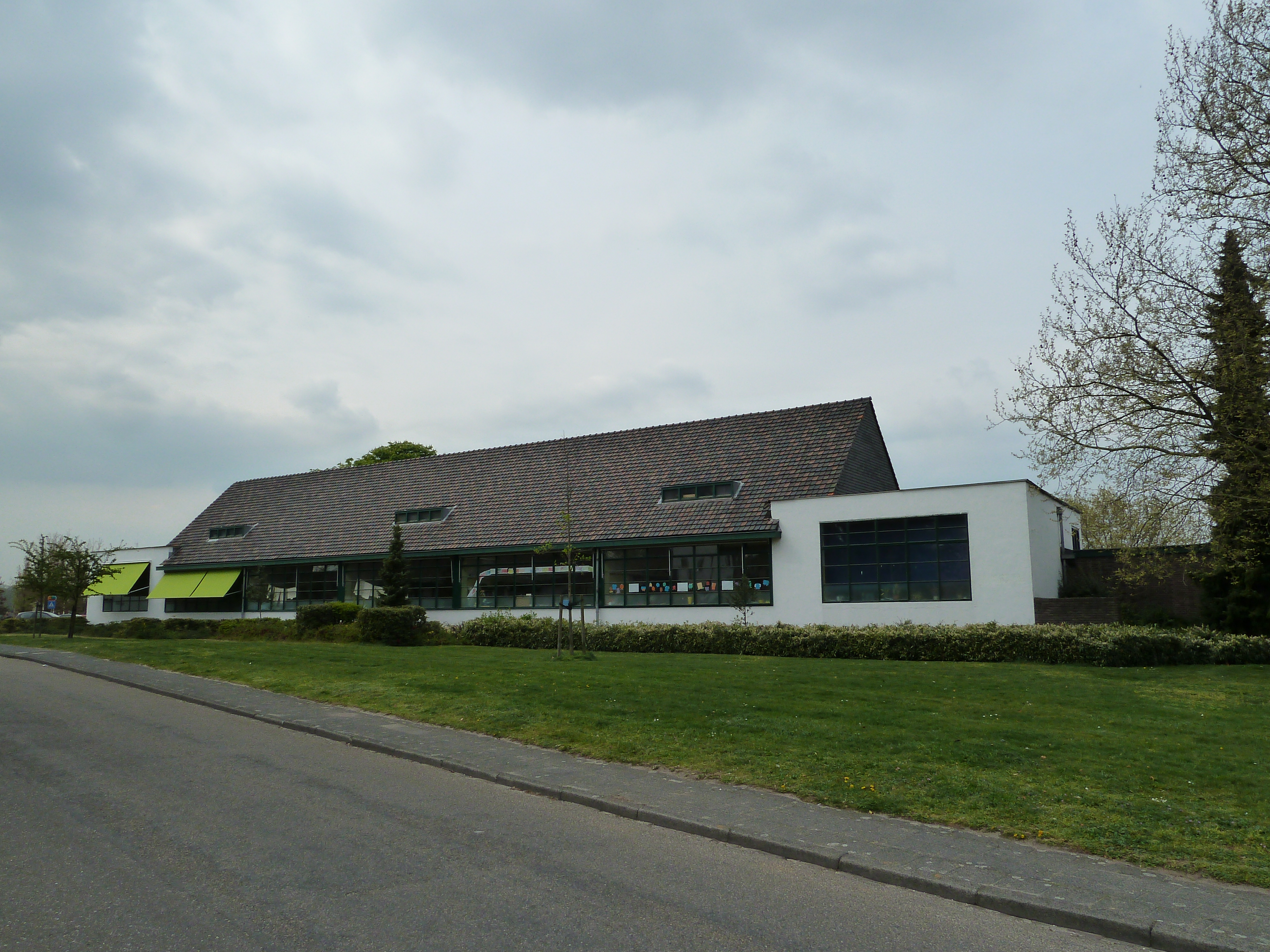
School
