= Merkelbeek =

- Village
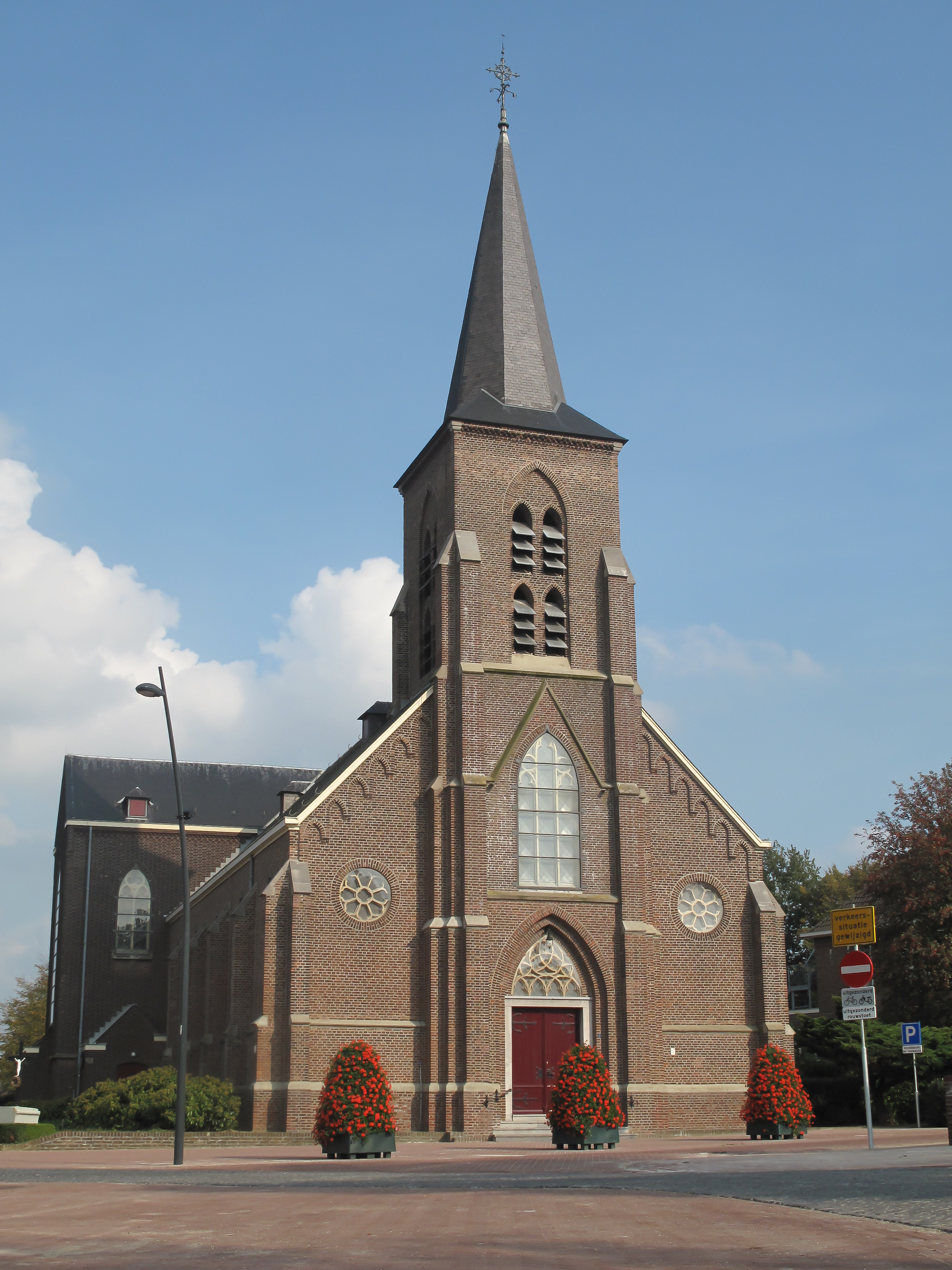
- Sint-Clemenskerk (Merkelbeek)

- Flag Seal

- Location in the Netherlands Location in the province of Limburg in the Netherlands
- Coordinates: 50°57′15″N 5°56′15″E
- Country: Netherlands
- Province: Limburg
- Municipality: Beekdaelen

Area
  - Total: 3.42 km^{2} (1.32 sq mi)
- Elevation: 81 m (266 ft)

Population (2021)
  - Total: 1,615
  - Density: 472/km^{2} (1,220/sq mi)
- Time zone: UTC+1 (CET)
  - Summer (DST): UTC+2 (CEST)
- Postal code: 6447
- Dialing code: 045/046

Merkelbeek (Limburgish: Merkelbek) is a village in the Dutch province of Limburg. It is located in the municipality of Beekdaelen, about 9 km northwest of Heerlen.

The village was first mentioned in 1283 as Merkelbeke. The etymology is unclear. Merkelbeek started in the Early Middle Ages along a brook and developed into a road village.

The Catholic St Clemens Church is a three-aisled church with built-in tower with needle spire which was built between 1876 and 1878. In 1935, the choir was replaced by a transept and choir in Gothic Revival style.

Merkelbeek was home to 309 people in 1840. It was a separate municipality until 1982, when it became part of Onderbanken. In 2019, it was merged into Beekdaelen.

== Gallery ==
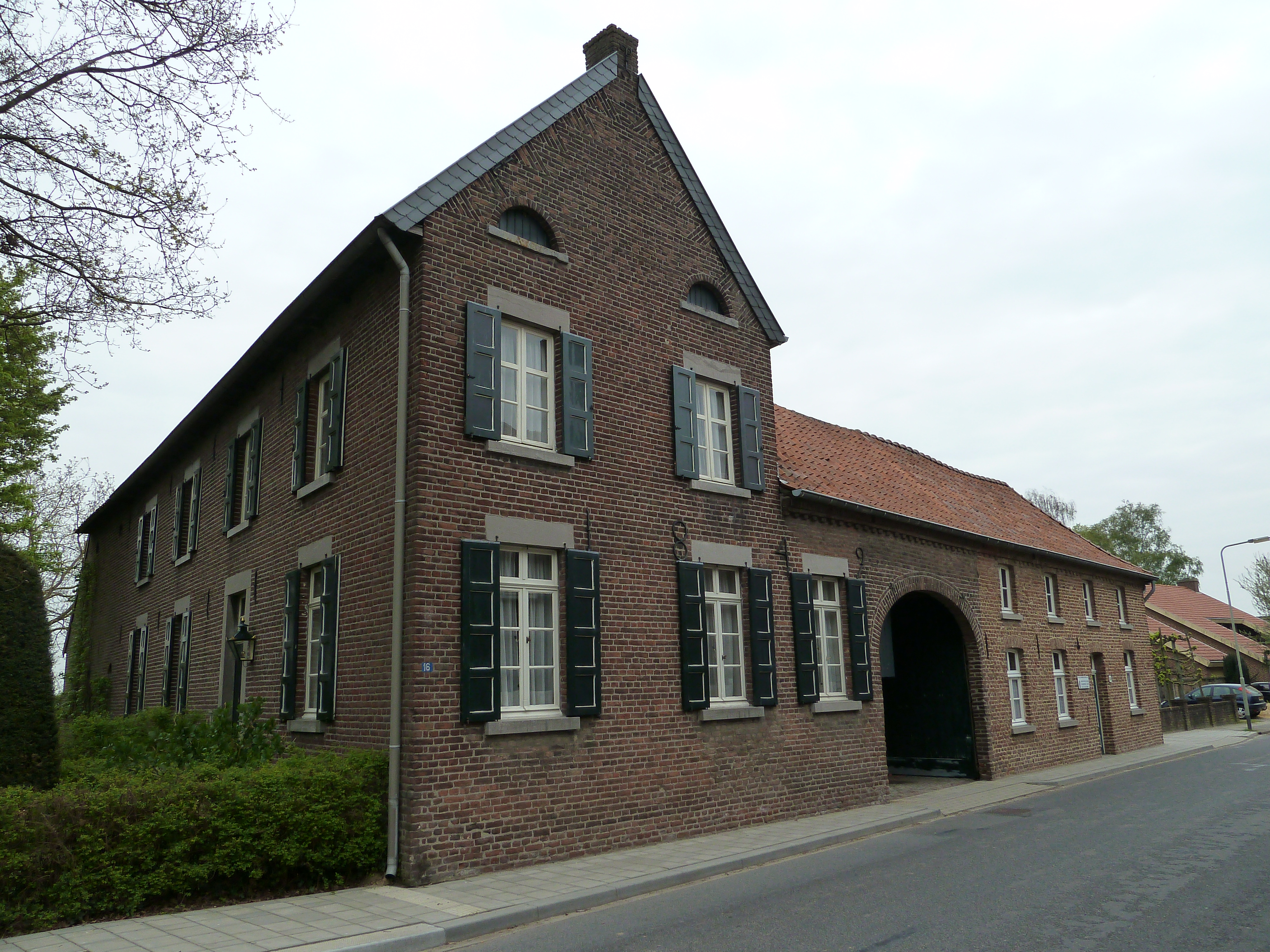
Farm in Merkelbeek

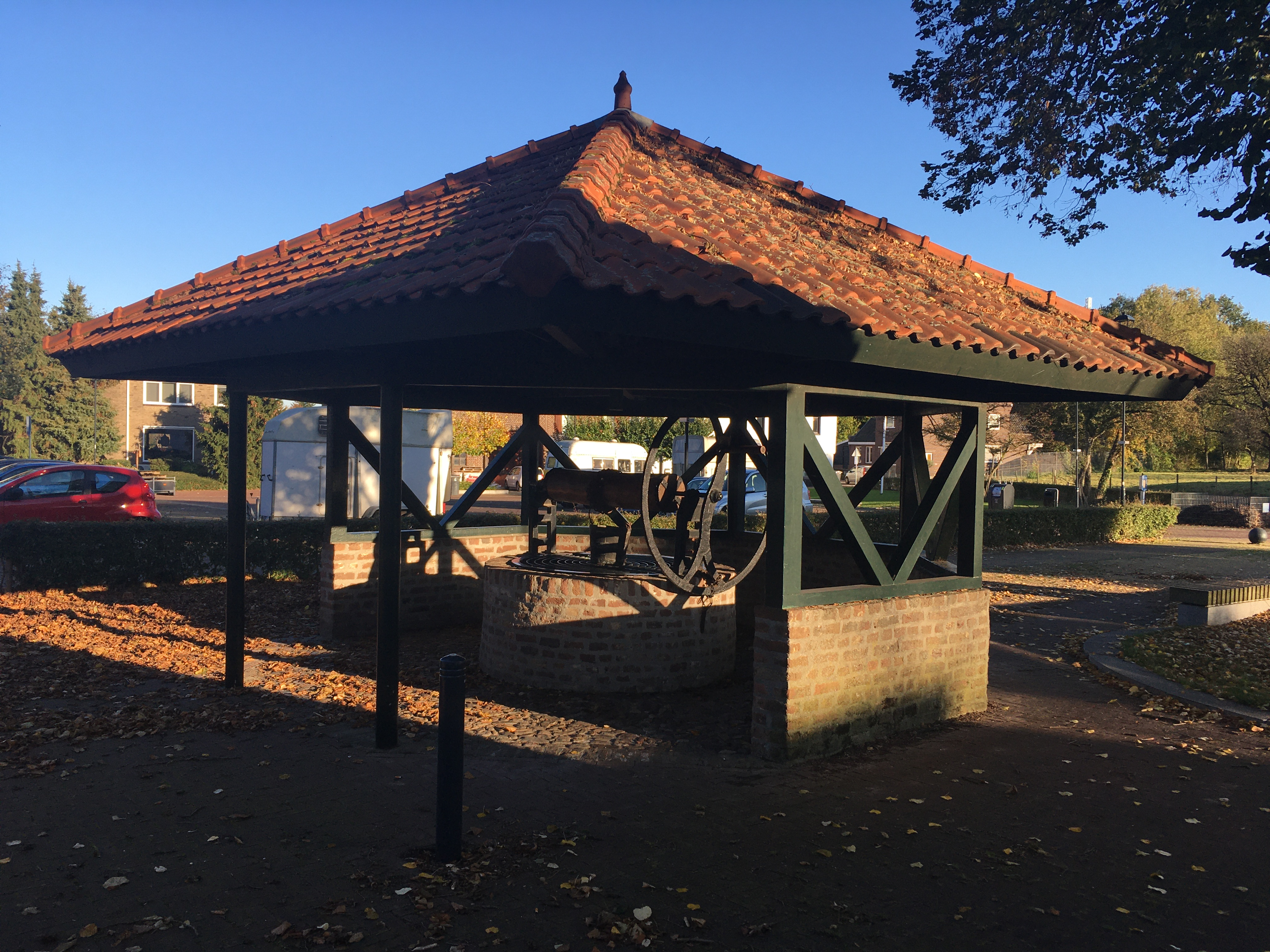
Well

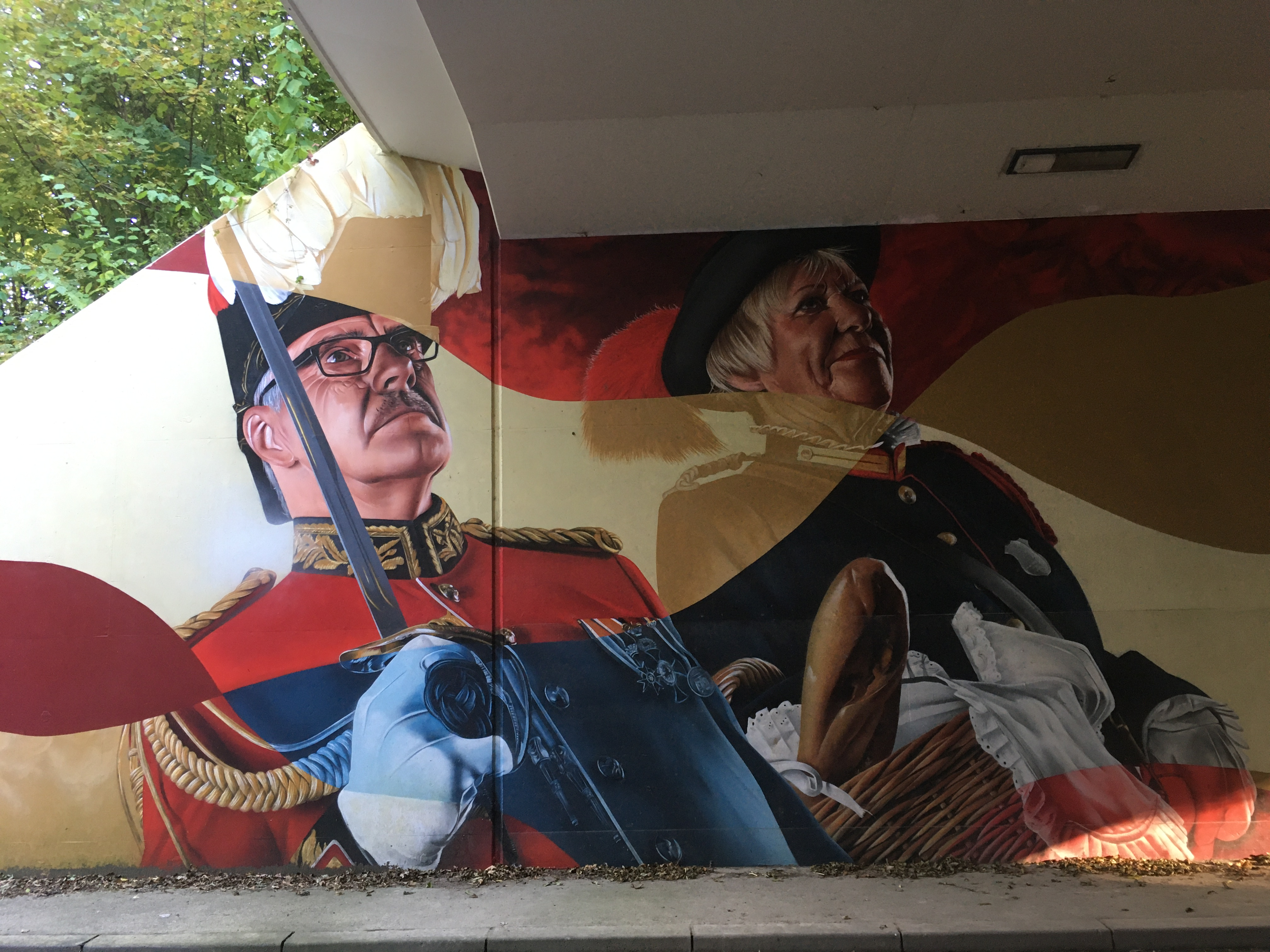
Tunnel with mural
