= Bingelrade =

- Village
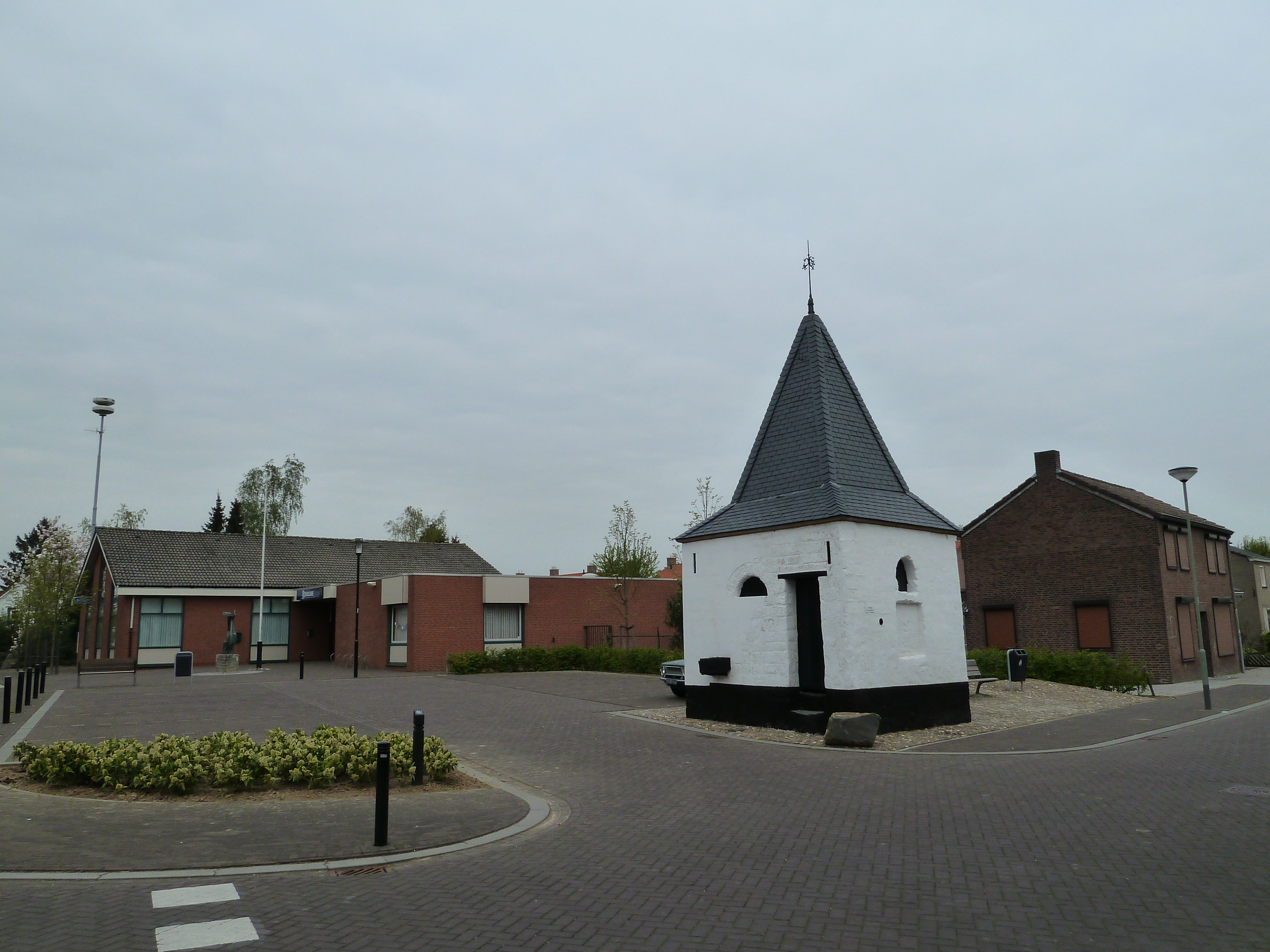
- Street view with water well

- Location in the Netherlands Location in the province of Limburg in the Netherlands
- Coordinates: 50°58′35″N 5°55′38″E
- Country: Netherlands
- Province: Limburg
- Municipality: Beekdaelen

Area
  - Total: 3.59 km^{2} (1.39 sq mi)
- Elevation: 75 m (246 ft)

Population (2021)
  - Total: 810
  - Density: 230/km^{2} (580/sq mi)
- Time zone: UTC+1 (CET)
  - Summer (DST): UTC+2 (CEST)
- Postal code: 6456
- Dialing code: 046

Bingelrade (Dutch pronunciation: [ˈbɪŋəlˌraːdə]; Limburgish: Bèngelder [ˈbɛŋəldəʀ]) is a village in the Dutch province of Limburg. It is a part of the municipality of Beekdaelen, and lies about 6 km southeast of Sittard.

== History ==
The village was first mentioned in 1263 as Binghenrode, and means "cultivation of the forest of Bingo (person)". Bingelrade started in the Middle Ages as a cultivation village and developed into a road village.

The Catholic St Lambertus Church has a gable roof central tower and was built in 1934 and 1935 as a replacement of the church from around 1500. The water well was built in the 19th century with chalk around a brick well from 1664. Raath Castle was built in 1686, but burnt down in 1751. In 1804 an estate was built in its place.

Bingelrade was home to 100 people in 1840. Bingelrade used to be a separate municipality. In 1982, it was merged into Onderbanken. In 2019, it became part of Beekdaelen municipality.

== Gallery ==
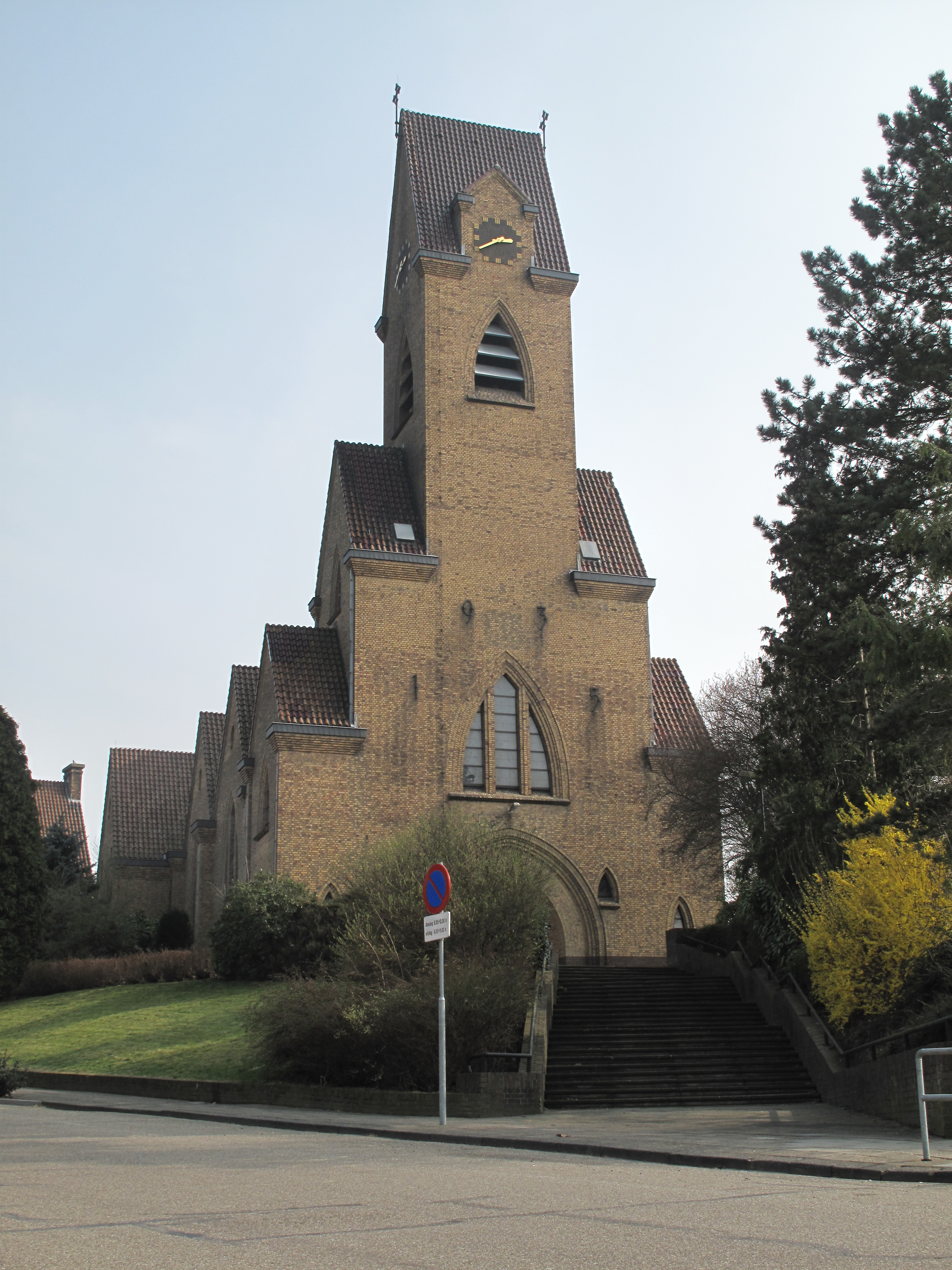
St Lamberts Church

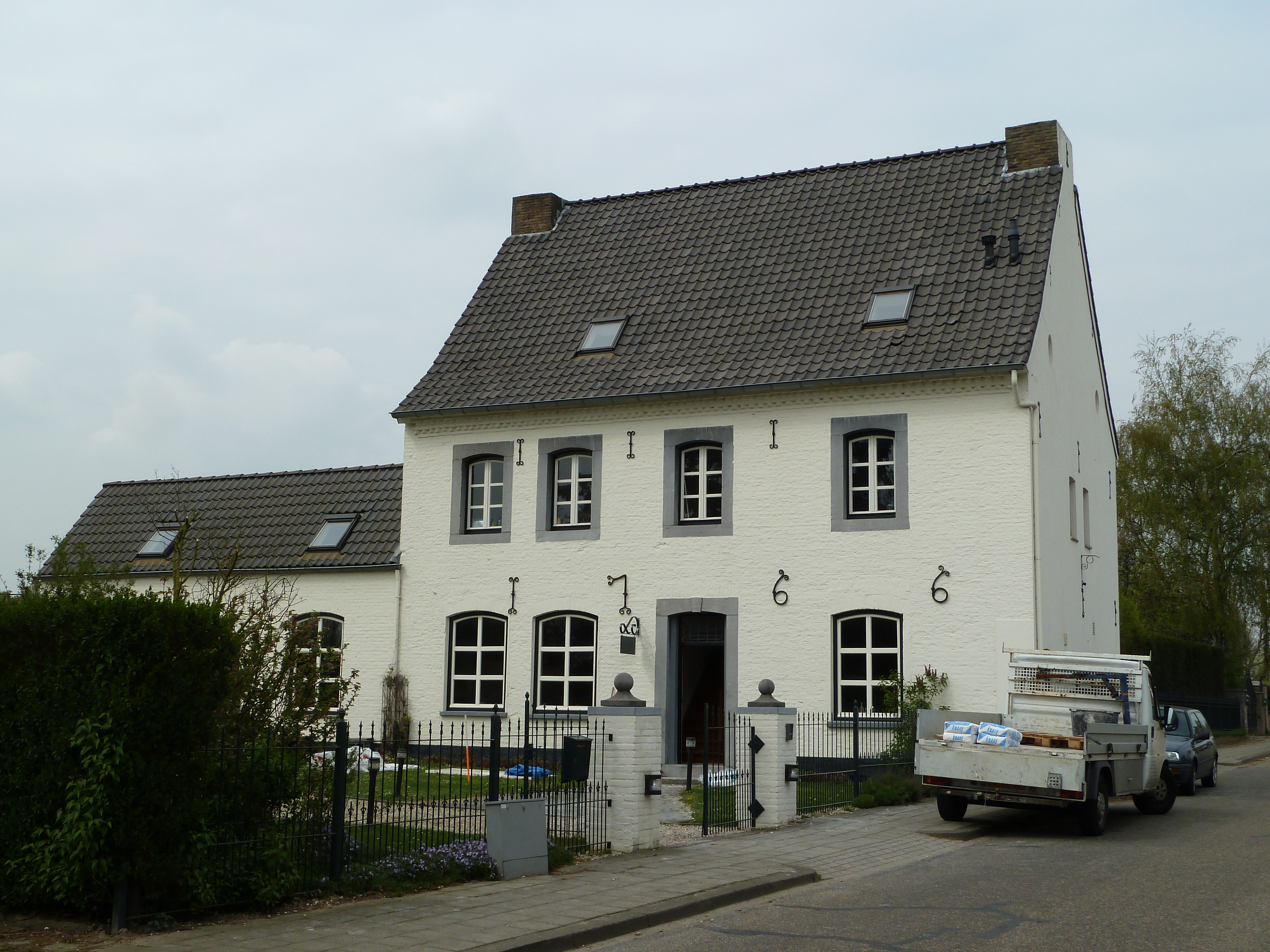
House from 1766

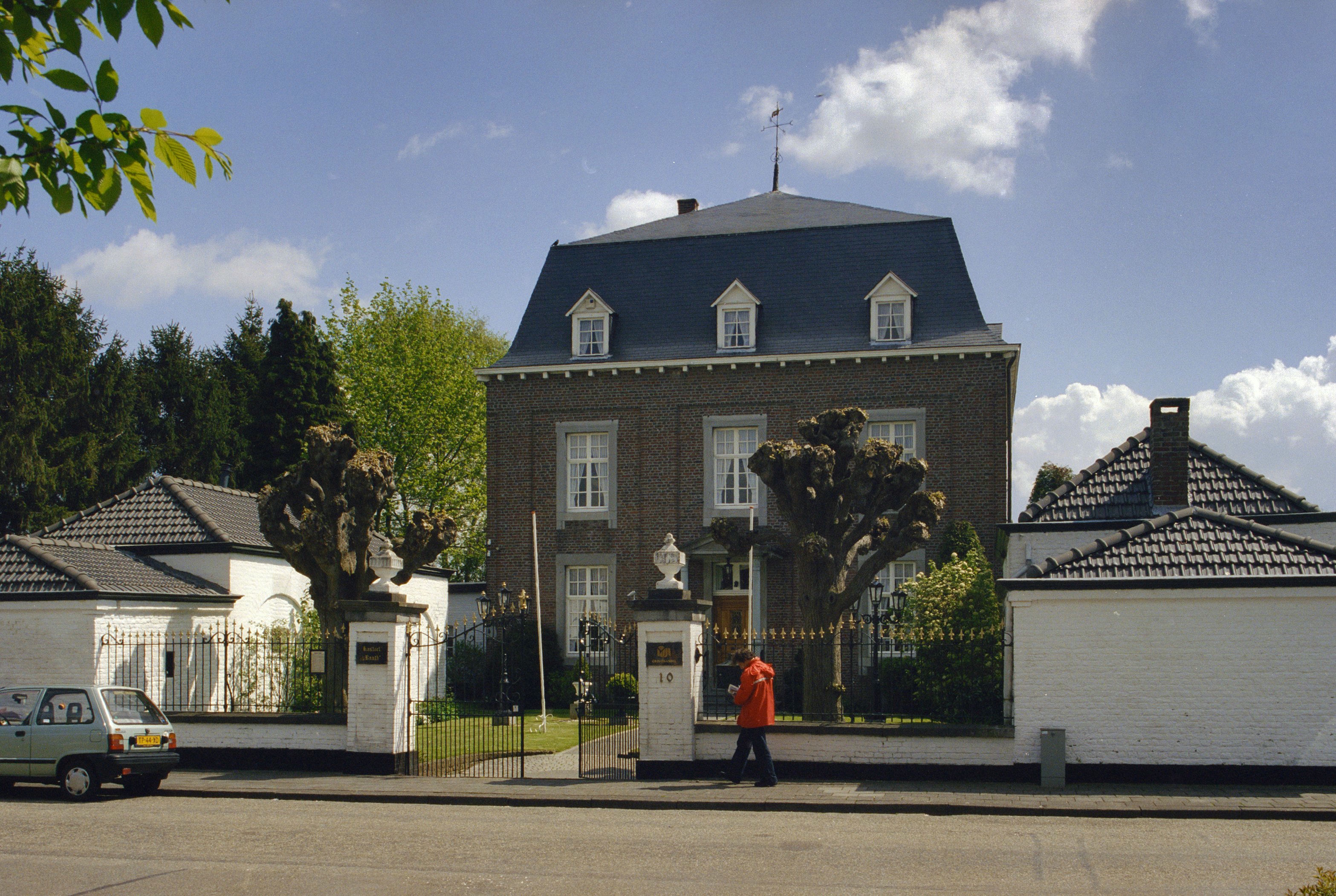
Huize Raath

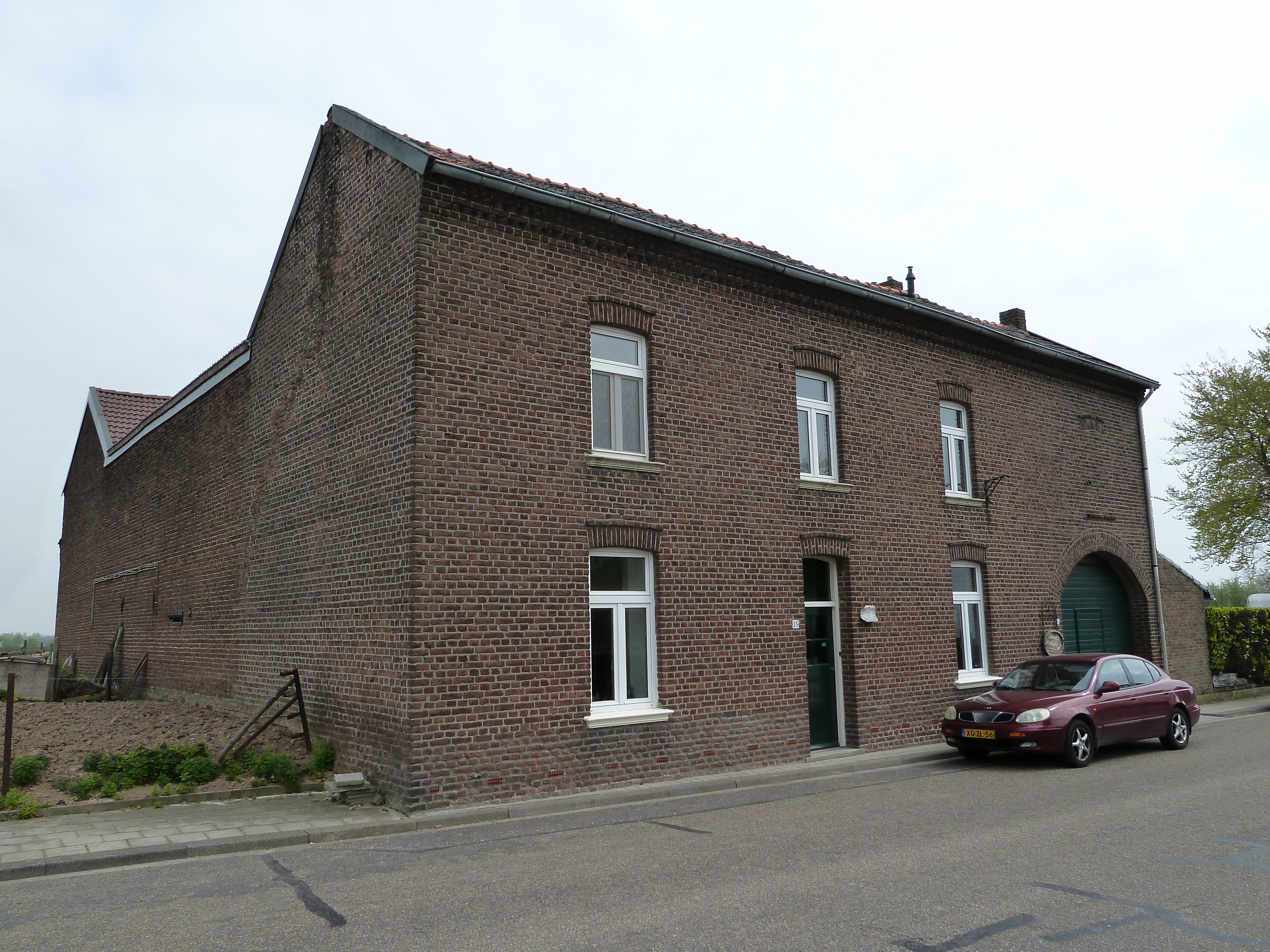
Farm in Bingelrade
