= Beekdaelen =

Beekdaelen Baekdale
- Municipality
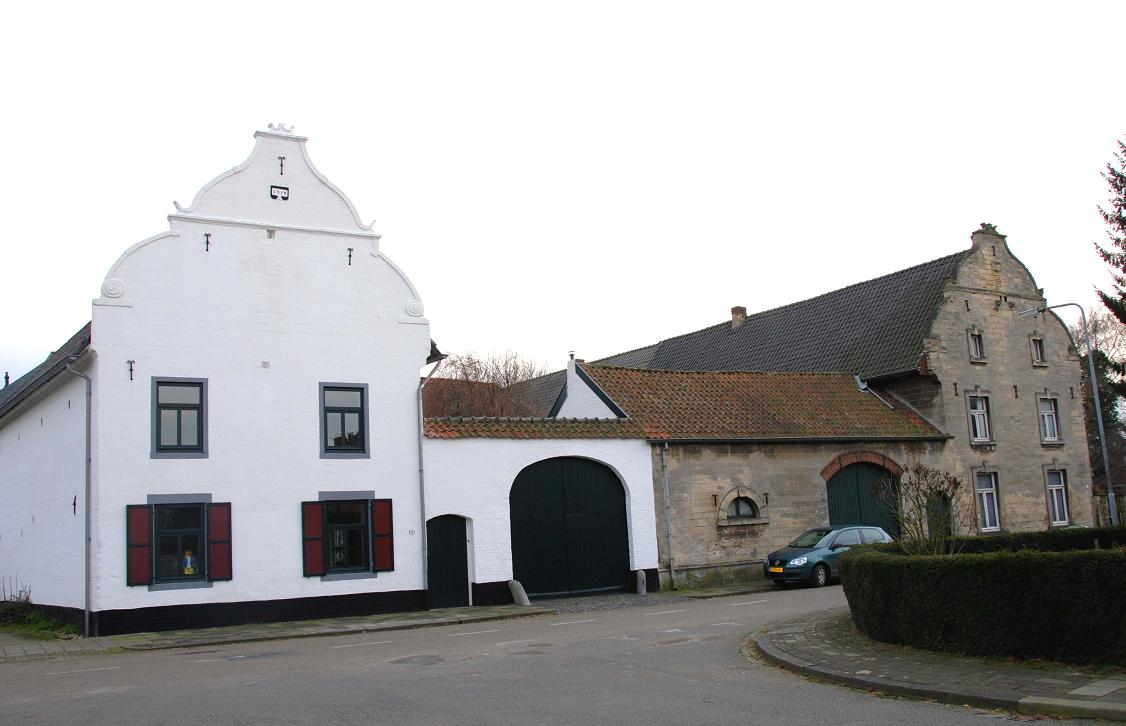
- Old farmhouse in Arensgenhout

- Flag Coat of arms

- Location in Limburg
- Coordinates: 50°55′N 5°53′E
- Country: Netherlands
- Province: Limburg

Government
  - Body: Municipal council
  - Mayor: Eric Geurts (PvdA)
- Time zone: UTC+1 (CET)
  - Summer (DST): UTC+2 (CEST)
- Postcode: 6155, 6174, 6365, 6436-6439
- Area code: 045, 046
- Website: www.beekdaelen.nl

Beekdaelen (Dutch: [beːɡˈdaːlə(n)]; Limburgish: Baekdale [bɛːɡˈdaːlə]) is a municipality in the province of Limburg, situated in the southern Netherlands. It was formed in 2019 as a merger of Nuth, Onderbanken and Schinnen.

Beekdaelen has 35,853 inhabitants. The village of Nuth is the biggest population centre in the municipality with 6,520 inhabitants. The other fourteen villages in the municipality are Amstenrade (2,670 inhabitants), Bingelrade (796 inhabitants), Doenrade (1,122 inhabitants), Hulsberg (3,954 inhabitants), Jabeek (752 inhabitants), Merkelbeek (1,564 inhabitants), Oirsbeek (3,733 inhabitants), Puth (2,004 inhabitants), Schimmert (3,236 inhabitants), Schinnen (2,692 inhabitants), Schinveld (4,629 inhabitants), Sweikhuizen (690 inhabitants), and Wijnandsrade (1,631 inhabitants). The other population centres belong to one of these villages.

== Politics ==
The local government is the municipality of Beekdaelen in the province of Limburg in the Netherlands. Beekdaelen has been its own municipality since a merger of the old municipalities of Nuth, Onderbanken, and Schinnen in January 2019. The municipality covers fifteen villages, the town hall is currently located in the village of Nuth. The first municipal election in Beekdaelen was in 2018.

Results of the elections of 2018, 2022 and 2026:

City council seats
| Party | 2018 | 2022 | 2026 |
|---|---|---|---|
| Vernieuwingsgroep | 6 | 7 | 8 |
| Beekdaelen Lokaal | 5 | 6 | 4 |
| CDA | 7 | 5 | 4 |
| GreenLeft | 2 | 3 | * |
| GreenLeft/PvdA | 2 | 3 | 3 |
| VVD | 3 | 2 | 4 |
| D66 | 1 | 1 | 1 |
| PvdA | 1 | 1 | * |
| VitaalBeekdaelen | 0 | 0 | 0 |
| BBB | 0 | 0 | 1 |
| Total seats | 25 | 25 | 25 |

- In 2026 the GreenLeft and PvdA presented a joint list.

=== Municipal government 2018–2022 ===
Following the 2018 municipal elections a coalition was formed consisting of CDA (Christian democratic), Vernieuwingsgroep (translation: Renewal Group, a local party), GroenLinks (green left), and PvdA (labour). In total 8 parties took part in the election, with 7 parties obtaining at least one seat.

In September 2021, Leon Rijkx (a councillor from CDA) left his party. He cited "the problematic culture within the local department of CDA". He joined the Vernieuwingsgroep and took his council seat with him, this increased the seat total of the Vernieuwingsgroep to 7 and decreased the seat total of CDA to 6, making the Vernieuwingsgroep the biggest party in terms of seat total.

Municipal executives
| Name | Portfolio | Party |
|---|---|---|
| Eric Geurts | Mayor of Beekdaelen; General Affairs, Safety, Integrity, Legal Affairs, & Communications | PvdA |
| Jan Hermans | Spatial Development, Public Space, Housing, & Traffic and Transport | Vernieuwingsgroep |
| Jeannette Quadvlieg-van Dam | Wellbeing, Loneliness, Aircraft Noise Disturbance, Water and Sewage, Civic Integration, & Social Affairs | Vernieuwingsgroep |
| Jos Timmermans | Energy Transition, Business Terrain, Entrepreneurs, & Coordination | CDA |
| Peter Janssen | Finance, Youth Care, & Education | CDA |
| John Essers | Sport and Associations, Arts and Culture, Quality of Life Initiatives, Health Care | GL and PvdA |

=== Municipal government 2022–present ===
Following the 2022 municipal elections a coalition was formed consisting of Vernieuwingsgroep (translation: Renewal Group, a local party), Beekdaelen Lokaal (translation: Beekdaelen Local, a local party), and CDA (Christian democratic). In total 7 parties took part in the election, with all parties obtaining at least one seat.

Leon Rijkx and Ton Kollée left Vernieuwingsgroep over disagreements with the party and the coalition on the location for the new town hall, leaving Vernieuwingsgroep with 5 seats. They currently sit on the municipal council as "Fractie Rijkx - Kollée".

Municipal executives
| Name | Portfolio | Party |
|---|---|---|
| Eric Geurts | Mayor of Beekdaelen; Safety & Internal Affairs | PvdA |
| Henk Reijnders | Housing, Economy & Environment | Beekdaelen Lokaal |
| Jan Hermans | Public Works & Energy Transition | Vernieuwingsgroep |
| Peter Janssen | Finance, Youth Care, & Education | CDA |
| Levin de Koster | Sport, Culture & Health | Vernieuwingsgroep |

== Topography ==
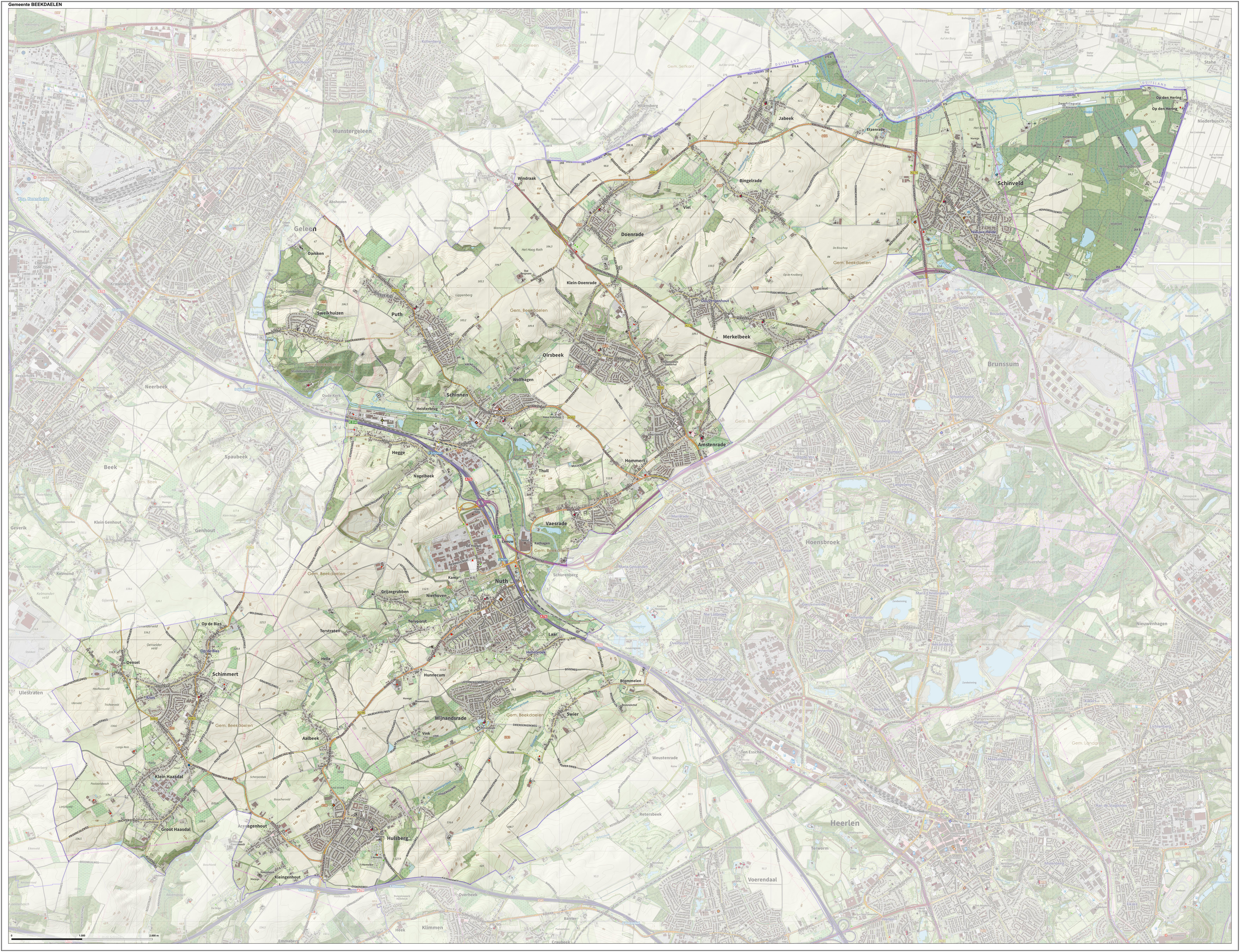

Map of the municipality of Beekdaelen, November 2018

== Notable people ==
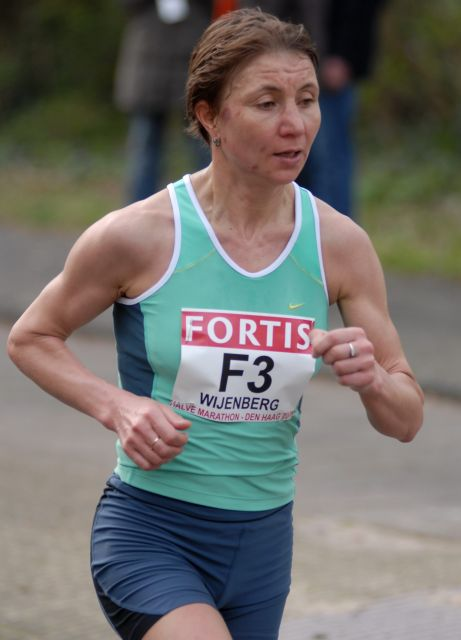
Nadja Wijenberg, 2008

- Auguste Kerckhoffs (1835 in Nuth – 1903) a linguist, cryptographer and academic
- Frans de Wever (1869 in Nuth – 1940) a general practitioner, municipal doctor and hospital founder
- Theo Rutten (1899 in Schinnen – 1980) a professor of psychology and a Dutch politician
- Johannes Herman Frederik Umbgrove (1899 in Hulsberg – 1954) a geologist and Earth scientist
- Leo Wetzels (born 1951 in Schinnen) academic and Editor-in-Chief of Probus International
- Peter Akkermans (born 1957 in Hulsberg) an archaeologist and academic

=== Sport ===
- Joep Packbiers (1875 in Nuth – 1957) an archer, competed at the 1920 Summer Olympics
- Frans Korver (1937 in Schinnen – 2024) a professional football player and manager
- Wim Ernes (1958 in Schimmert – 2016) an equestrian dressage coach
- Nadezhda Wijenberg (born 1964) a long-distance runner, lives in Schinnen,
- Julie Zwarthoed (born 1994 in Schinnen) an ice hockey player

== Gallery ==
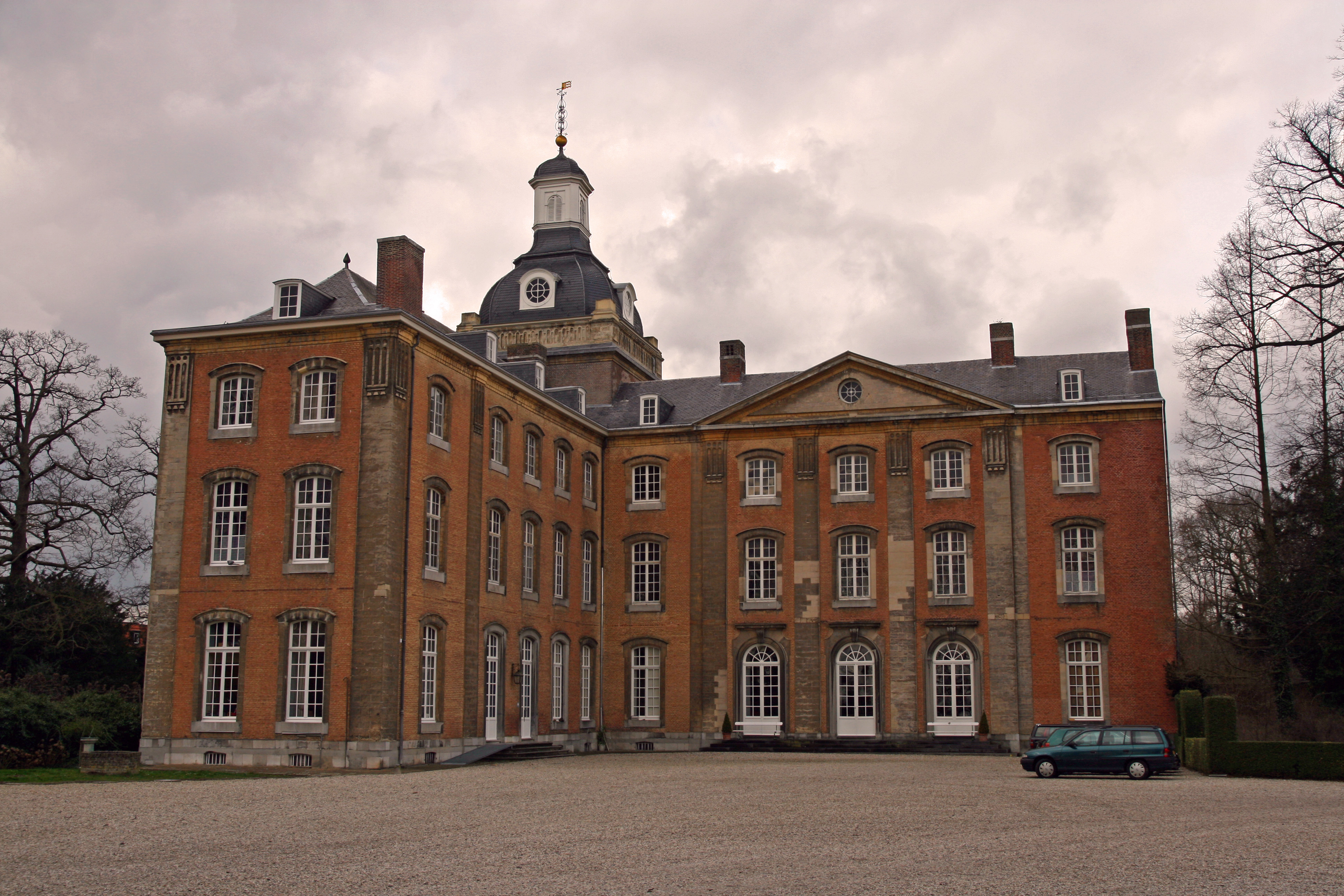
Kasteel Amstenrade

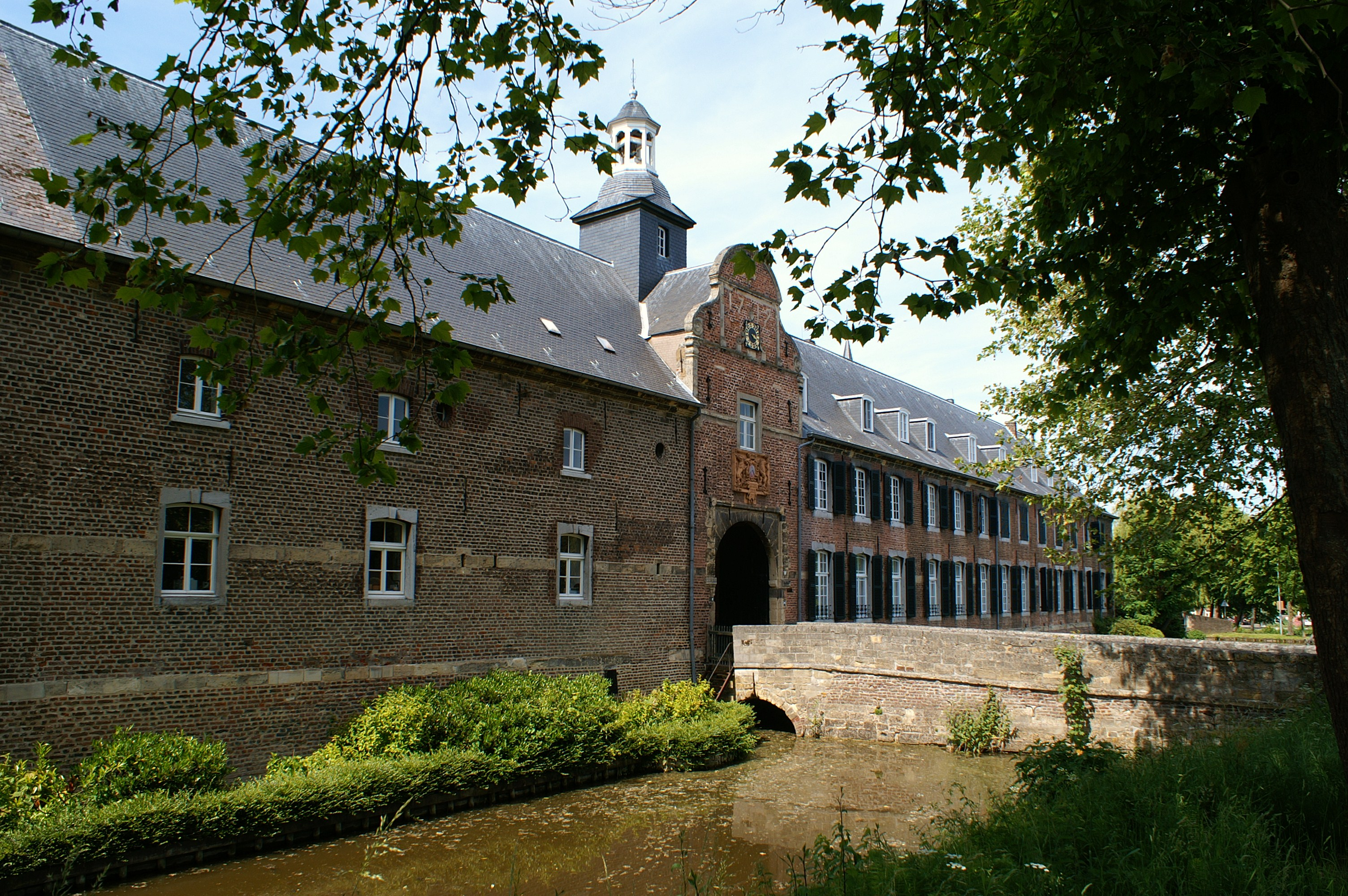
Kasteel Wijnandsrade

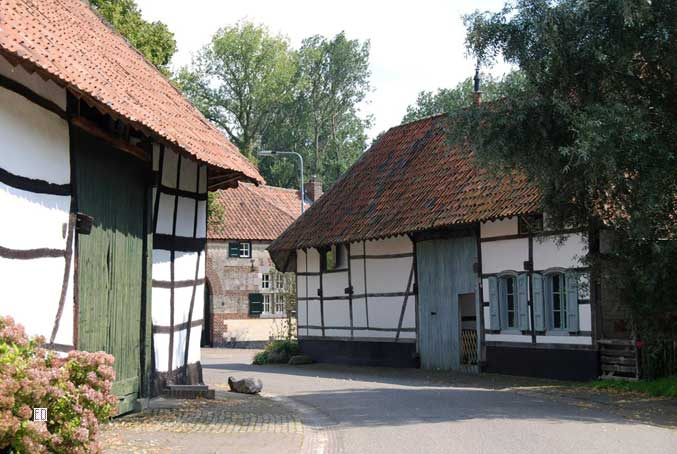
Terstraten, Nuth

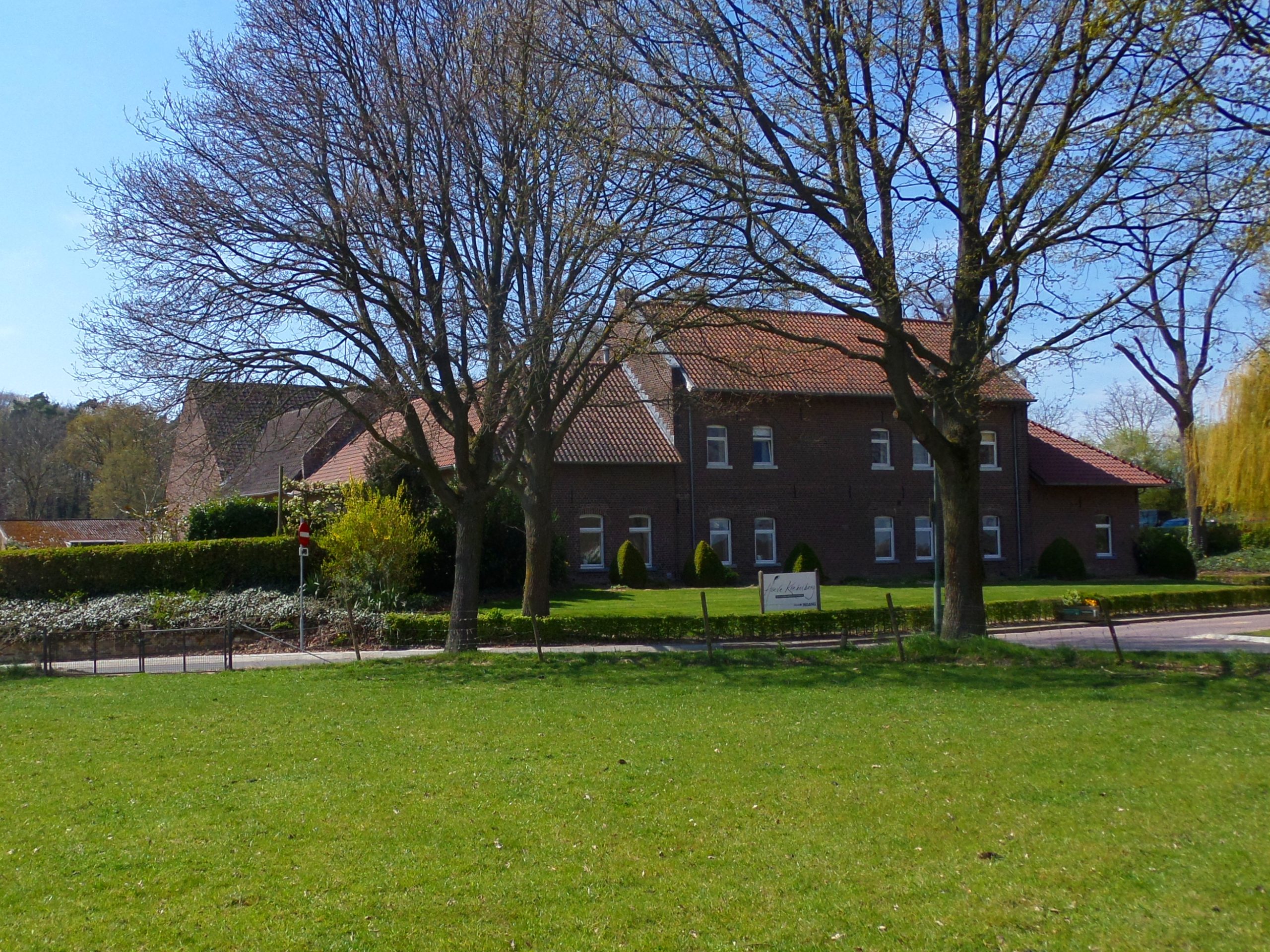
Hoeve Krekelberg, Schinnen

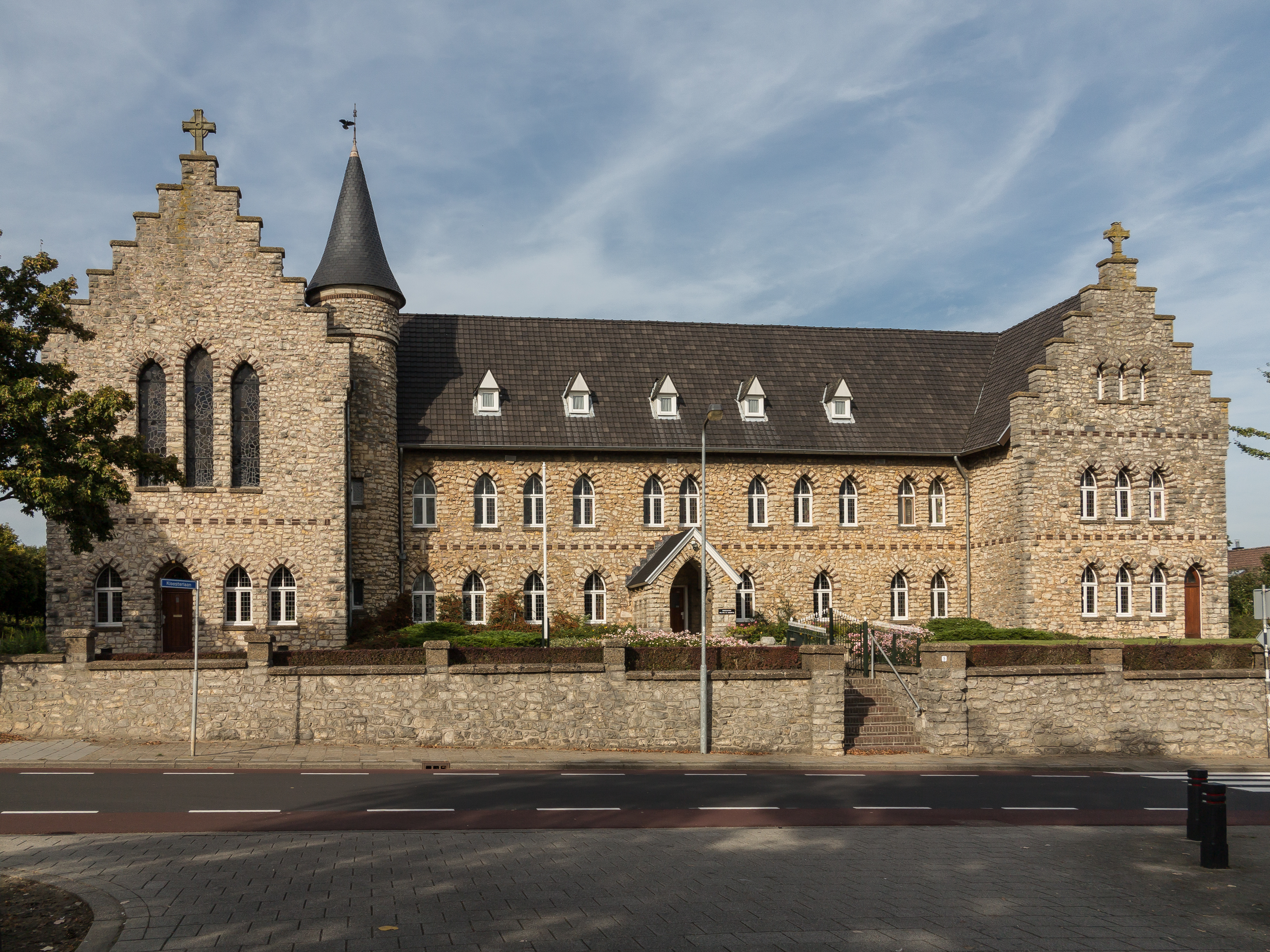
Hulsberg, monastery

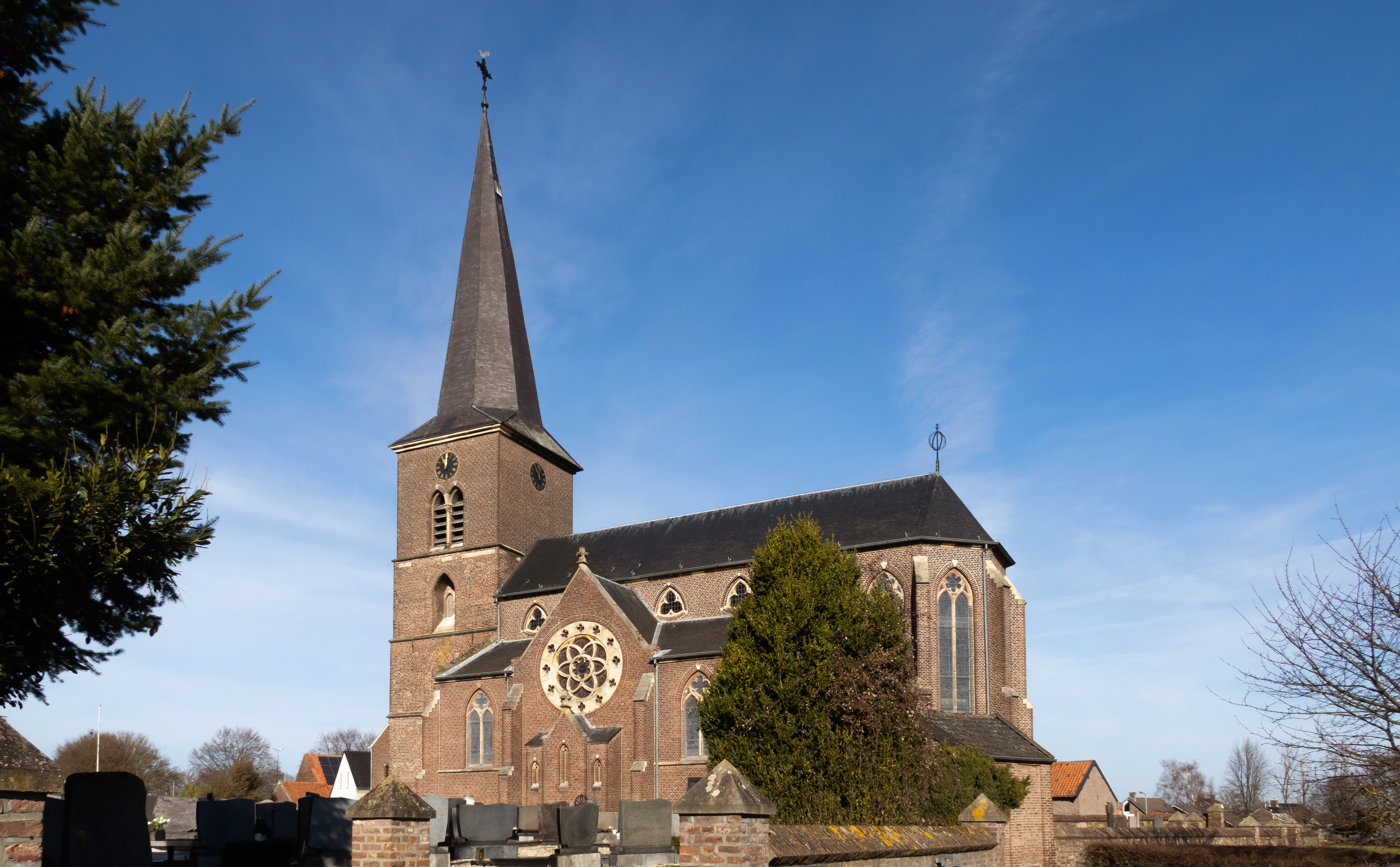
Jabeek, church: the Sint-Gertrudiskerk
