= Oirsbeek =

- Village
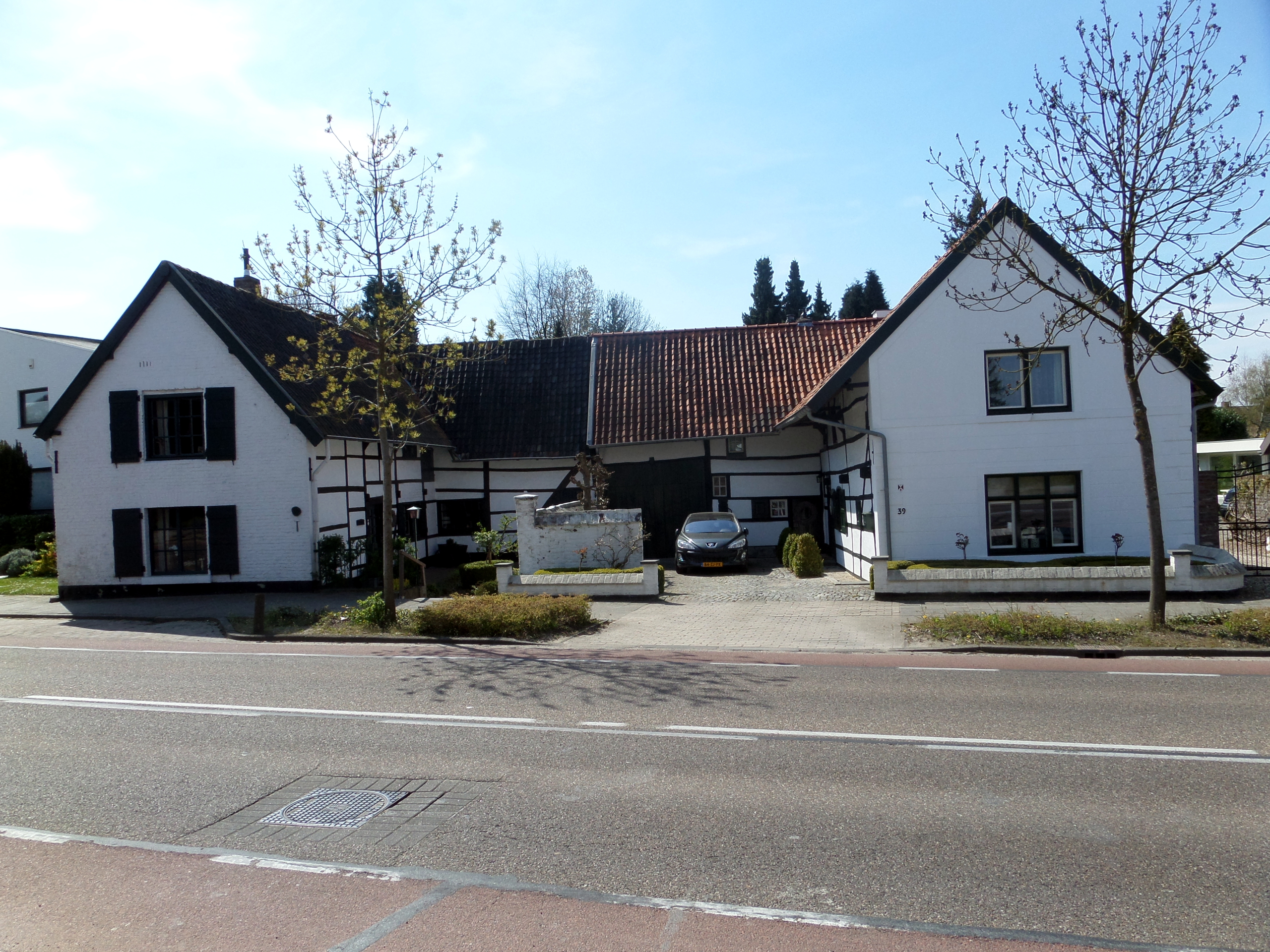
- Timber framed farms

- Location in the Netherlands Location in the province of Limburg in the Netherlands
- Coordinates: 50°56′56″N 5°54′32″E
- Country: Netherlands
- Province: Limburg
- Municipality: Beekdaelen

Area
  - Total: 2.87 km^{2} (1.11 sq mi)
- Elevation: 109 m (358 ft)

Population (2021)
  - Total: 3,580
  - Density: 1,250/km^{2} (3,230/sq mi)
- Time zone: UTC+1 (CET)
  - Summer (DST): UTC+2 (CEST)
- Postal code: 6438
- Dialing code: 046

Oirsbeek is a village in the southeast of the Netherlands, part of the municipality of Beekdaelen. Between 1839 and 1982, Oirsbeek was a separate municipality.

The Sint Lambertuskerk, a Roman Catholic Church, was built in 1951 by Frits Peutz on the remains of two older churches: the original church built in 1514 and a second church built in 1830.

It is unknown where the name Oirsbeek originates from. It is certain that the name has to do with "beek", the is Dutch word for creek, that used to flow through the village. "Oir" could come from "Oer" (meaning iron-rich dirt) which is found in the area. The creek was called "vloot" by people from Oirsbeek in the past. Currently it runs through a tube in the ground under the "Grachtstraat". From there it flows in the direction of Wolfhagen, part of the village of Schinnen.

Oirsbeek used to be one of 4 suburbs, "Gracht", "Klein-Doenrade", "Oirsbeek" and "Oppeven".

== Hells Angels ==
Until 2004 a famous chapter of the Hells Angels Holland, The Nomads, had its clubhouse in Oirsbeek. On 11 February 2004 the chairman and two members were killed by the other members in the clubhouse. The dead bodies were found two days later in a small river near Echt-Susteren. This tragedy was world news for some time. Many Hells Angels from all over the world came to the funeral of the three members in Sittard. The event was broadcast live on Dutch television.

== Gallery ==
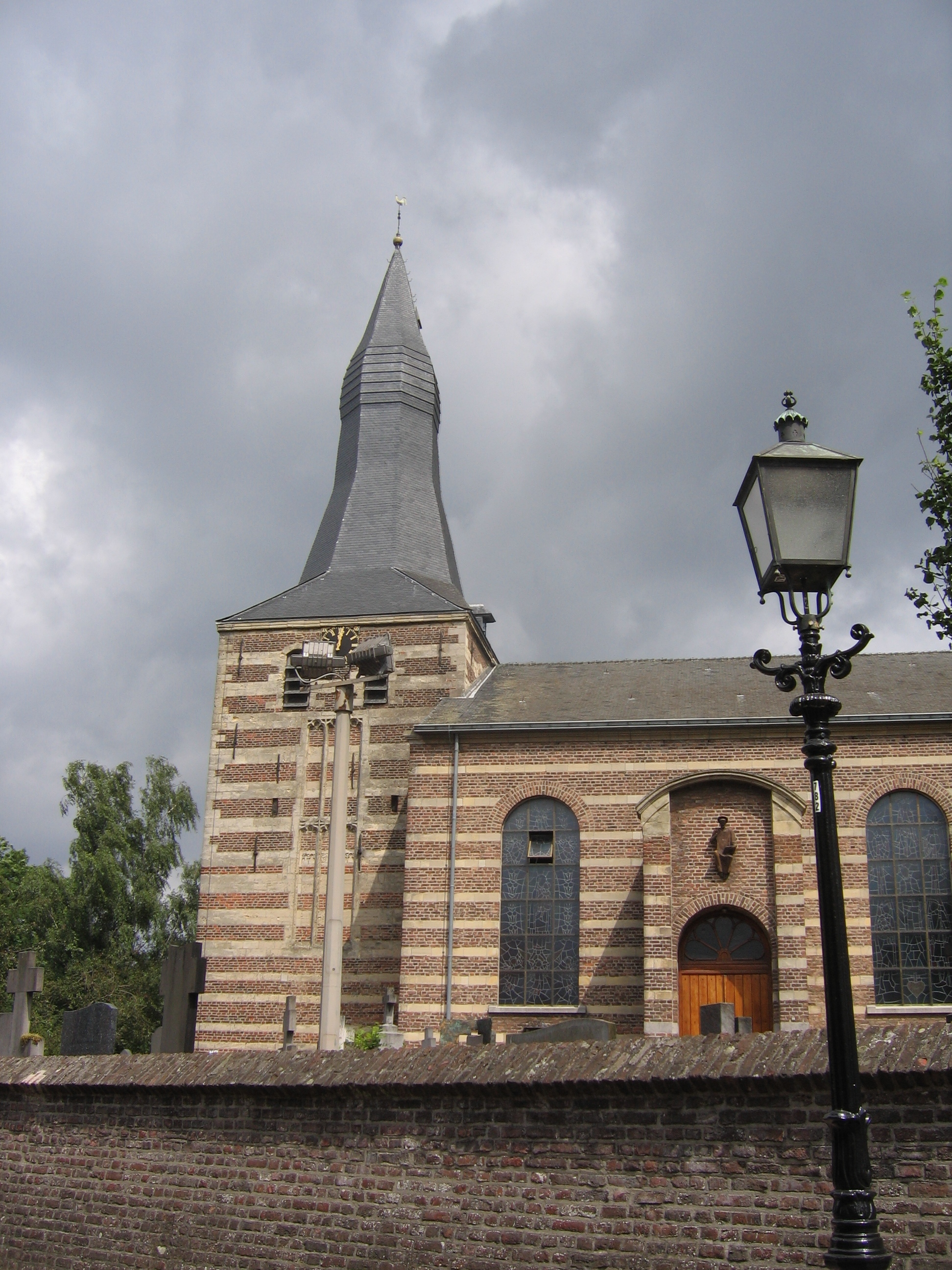
St. Lambertuskerk, Oirsbeek

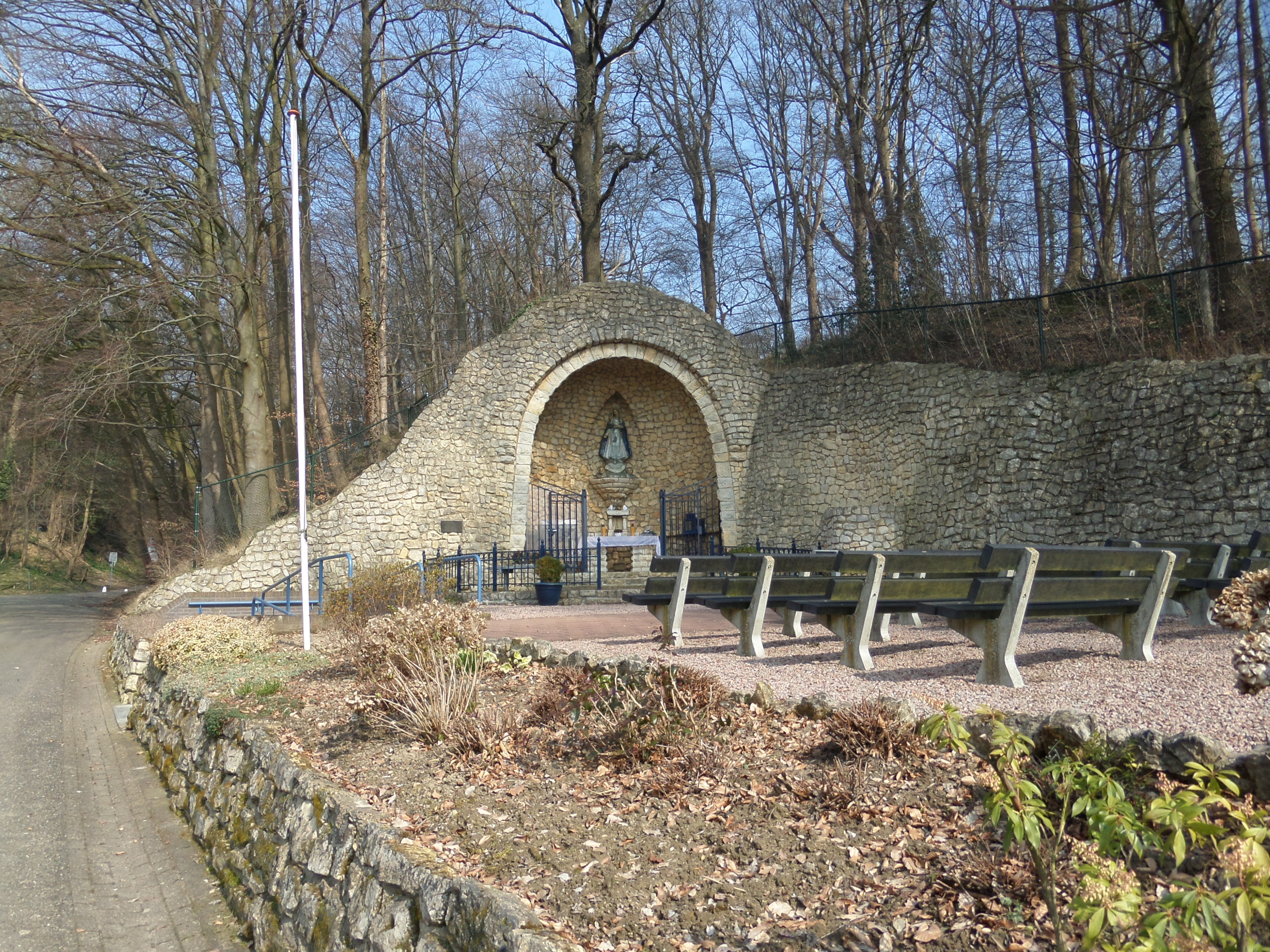
Fatima cave

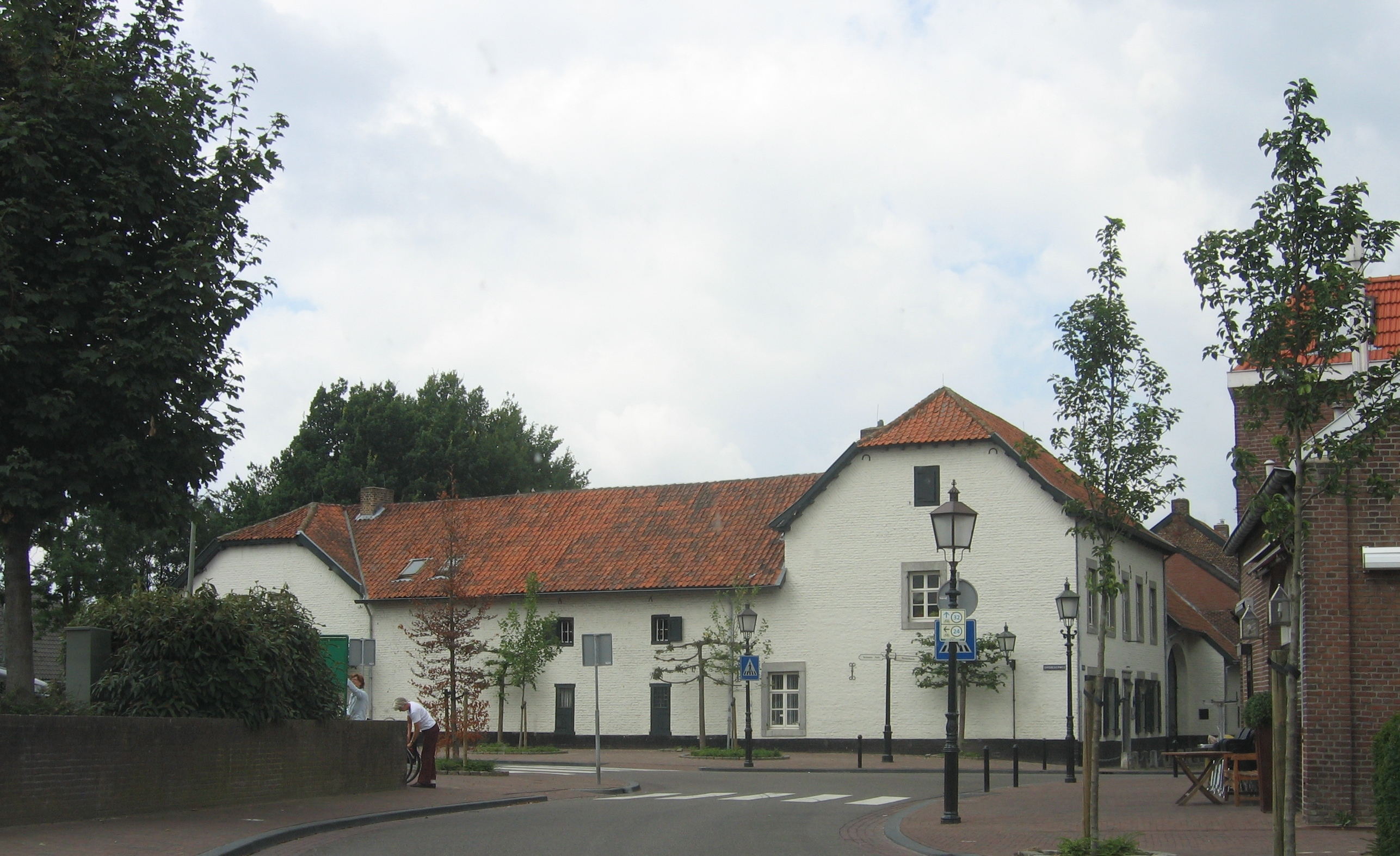
schepenbank (predecessor of the town hall)

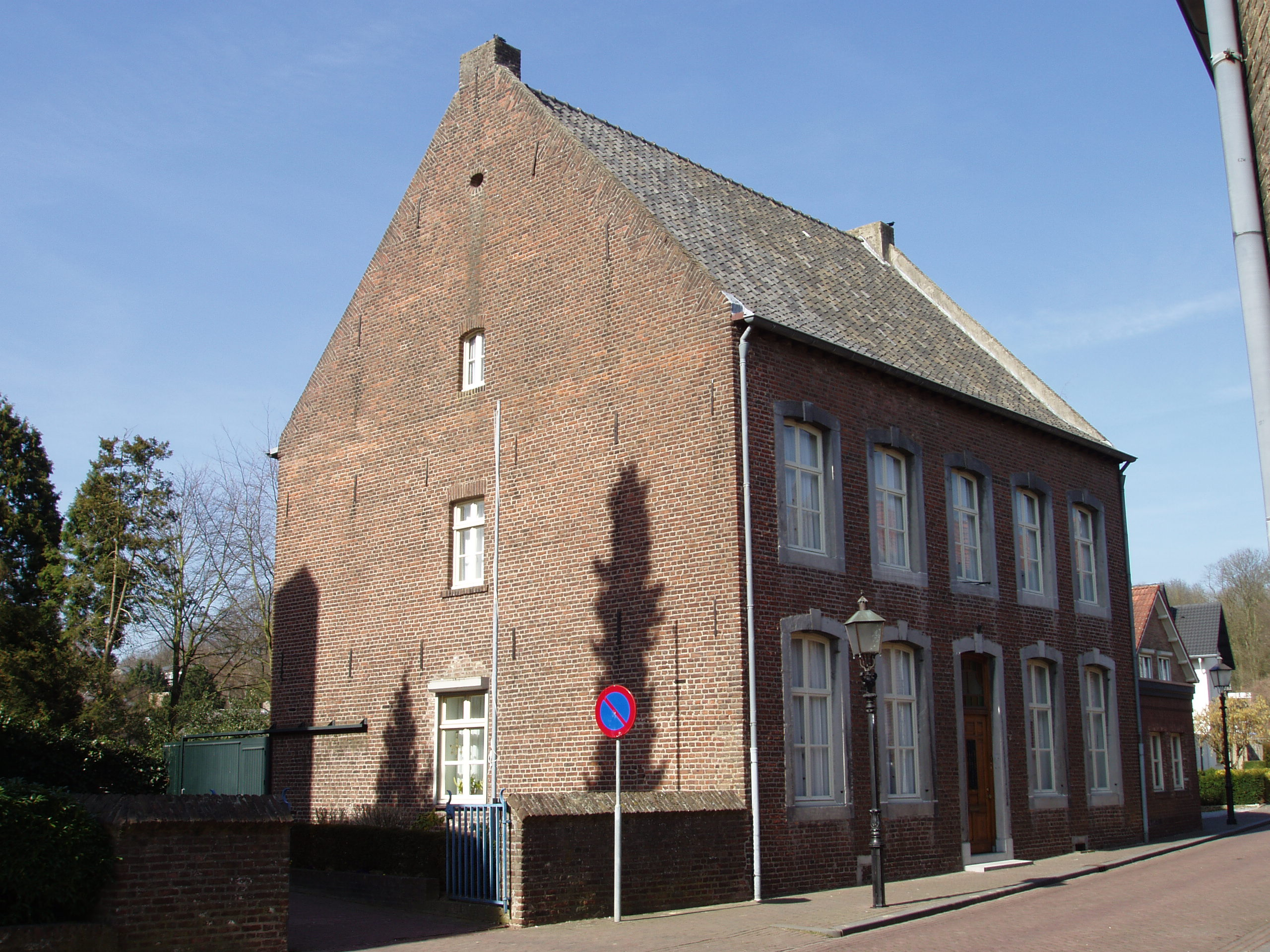
House in Oirsbeek
