= Onderbanken =

Onderbanken Óngerbenk
- Former Municipality
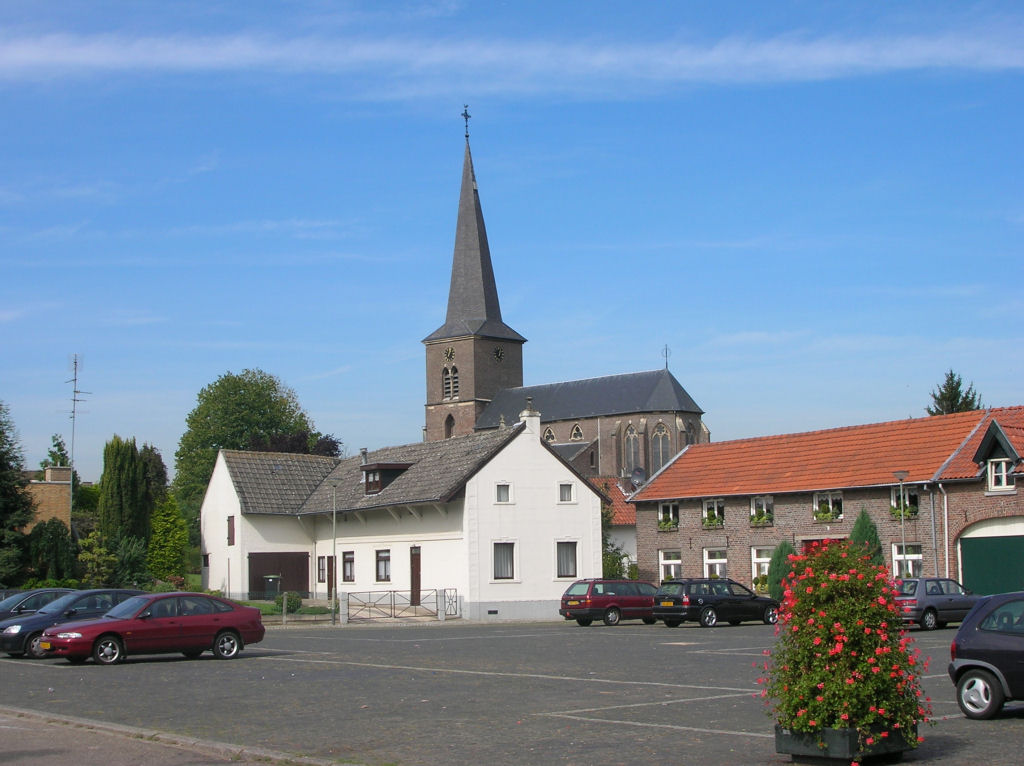
- Church in Jabeek

- Flag Coat of arms

- Location in Limburg
- Coordinates: 50°58′N 5°59′E
- Country: Netherlands
- Province: Limburg
- Municipality: Beekdaelen
- Established: 1 January 1982
- Merged: 2019

Area
  - Total: 21.24 km^{2} (8.20 sq mi)
  - Land: 21.18 km^{2} (8.18 sq mi)
  - Water: 0.06 km^{2} (0.023 sq mi)
- Elevation: 68 m (223 ft)

Population (January 2021)
  - Total: data missing
- Time zone: UTC+1 (CET)
  - Summer (DST): UTC+2 (CEST)
- Postcode: 6447–6456
- Area code: 045, 046
- Website: www.onderbanken.nl

Onderbanken (Dutch pronunciation: [ˈɔndərˌbɑŋkə(n)]; Limburgish: Óngerbenk) was a municipality in the southeastern Netherlands. In 2019, it merged with Nuth and Schinnen to form the municipality of Beekdaelen.

== Population centres ==
Bingelrade, Douvergenhout, Etzenrade, Jabeek, Merkelbeek, Op den Hering, Quabeek, Raath, Schinveld, Viel.

=== Topography ===
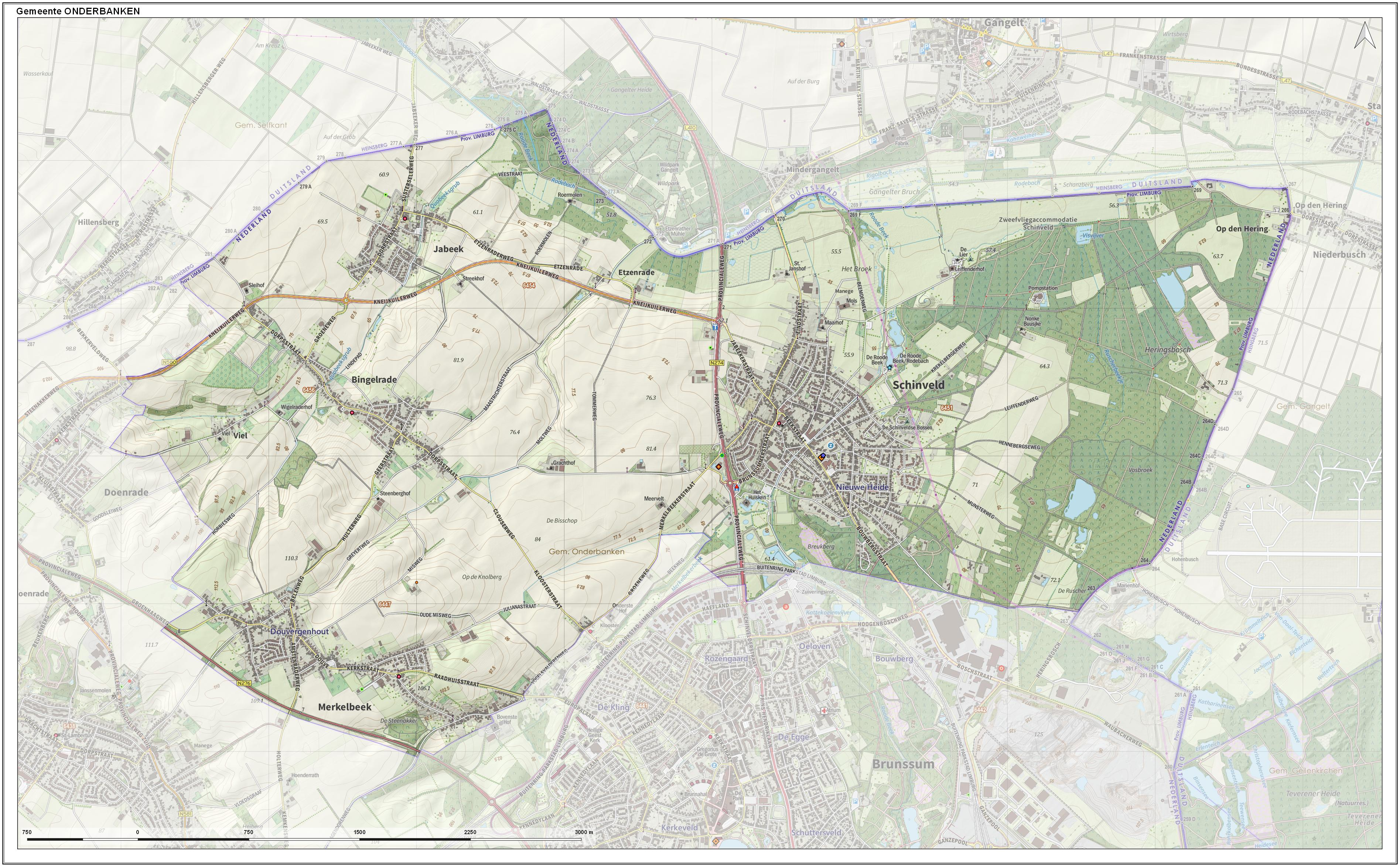

Dutch Topographic map of the municipality of Onderbanken, June 2015.
