= Coumans =

Coumans is a surname. Notable people with the surname include:

- André Coumans (1893–1958), Belgian horse rider
- Hans Coumans (1943–1986), Dutch painter
- Theo Coumans, Dutch drummer, member of Pussycat (band)
- Thomas Coumans (born 1984), Belgian actor
