= Schin op Geul =

- Village
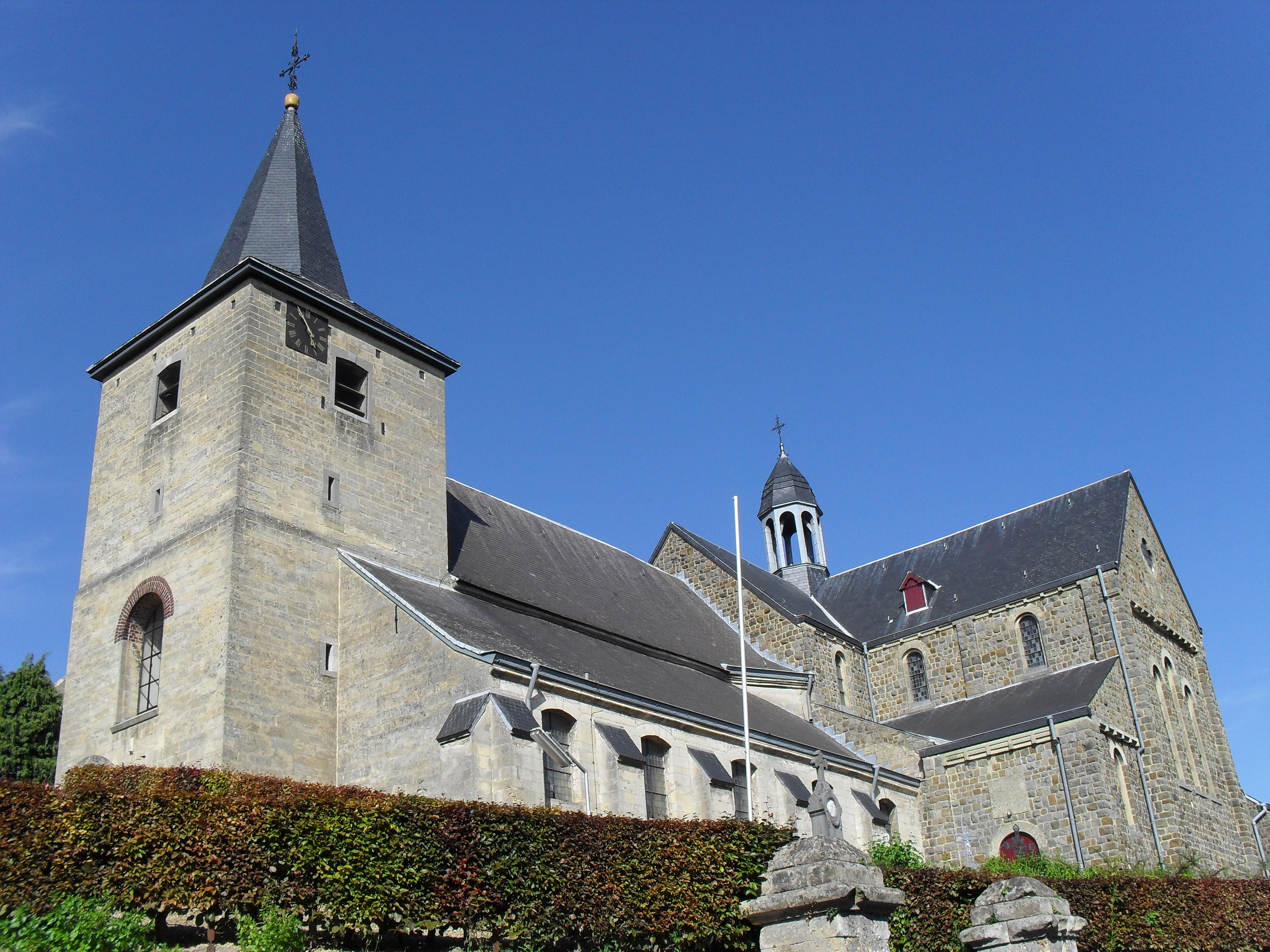
- Roman Catholic church of Saint Maurice

- Location in the Netherlands Location in the province of Limburg in the Netherlands
- Coordinates: 50.85463°N 5.87005°E
- Country: Netherlands
- Province: Limburg
- Municipality: Valkenburg aan de Geul

Area
  - Total: 0.69 km^{2} (0.27 sq mi)
- Elevation: 75 m (246 ft)

Population (2021)
  - Total: 695
  - Density: 1,000/km^{2} (2,600/sq mi)
- Time zone: UTC+1 (CET)
  - Summer (DST): UTC+2 (CEST)
- Postal code: 6305
- Dialing code: 043
- Major roads: N595

Schin op Geul (Dutch pronunciation: [ˌsxɪn ɔp ˈxøːl], Limburgish: Sjin) is a village in the Dutch province of Limburg. It is located in the municipality of Valkenburg aan de Geul, about 3 km southeast of the town of Valkenburg.

== History ==
The village was first mentioned in the middle of the 11th century as de Schina. The etymology is unclear. Schin op Geul used to belong to the Land van Valkenburg.

The Catholic St Maurice Church is a three aisled basilica-like church. It contains elements which are probably from the 11th century. The tower and the north aisle collapsed in 1762 and were rebuilt in 1768. In 1926, the choir was rebuilt.

Schin op Geul was home to 92 people in 1840. In 1853, the Schin op Geul railway station opened on the Aachen to Maastricht railway line. In 1915, a railway line to Heerlen was added. The line to Aachen closed in 1992. It served by Veolia

Schin op Geul was a separate municipality until 1940, when it was merged with Valkenburg. In 1982, it became part of the municipality of Valkenburg aan de Geul.

In 2004 it was the venue for the Linuxbierwanderung.

== Gallery ==
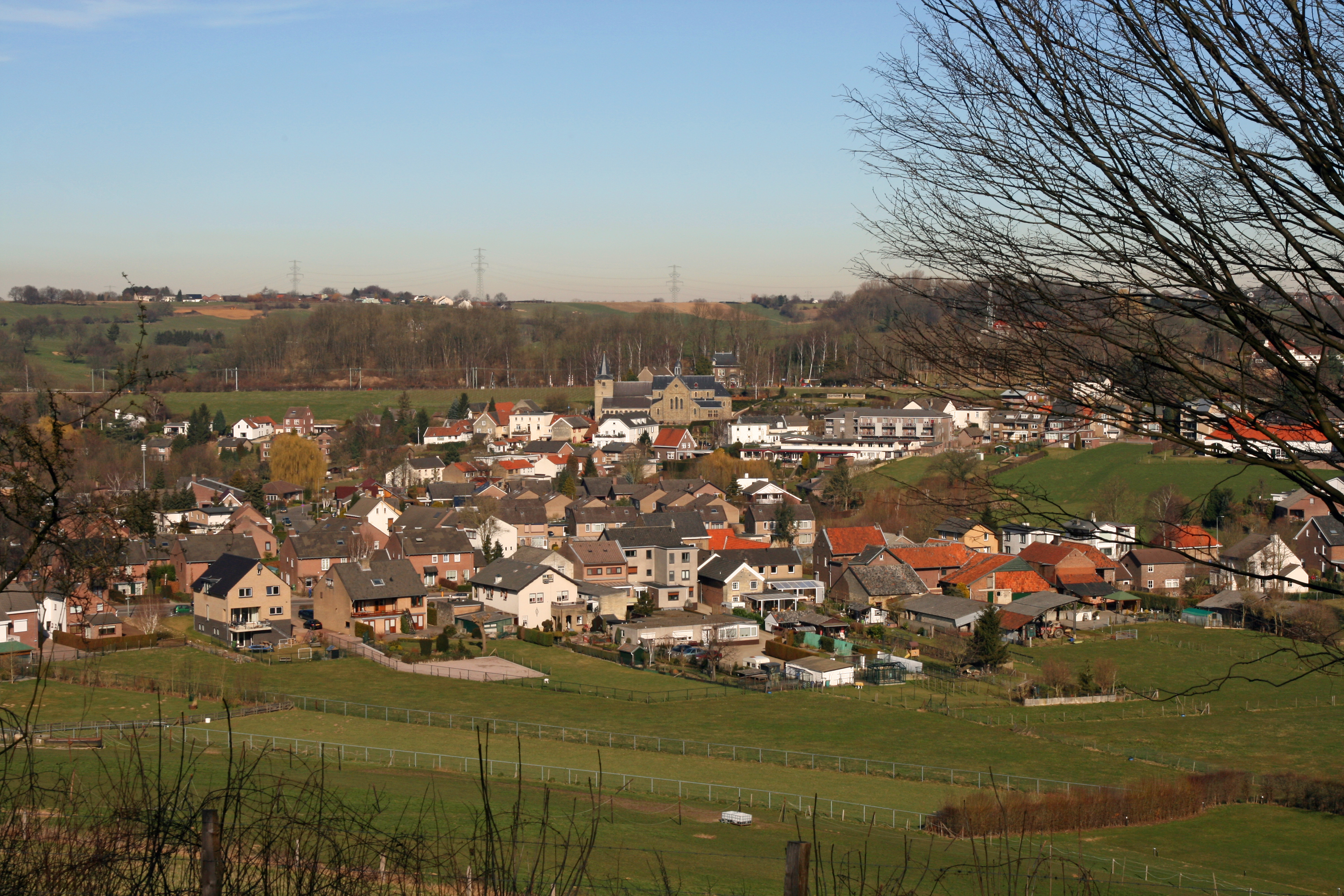
View on Schin op Geul

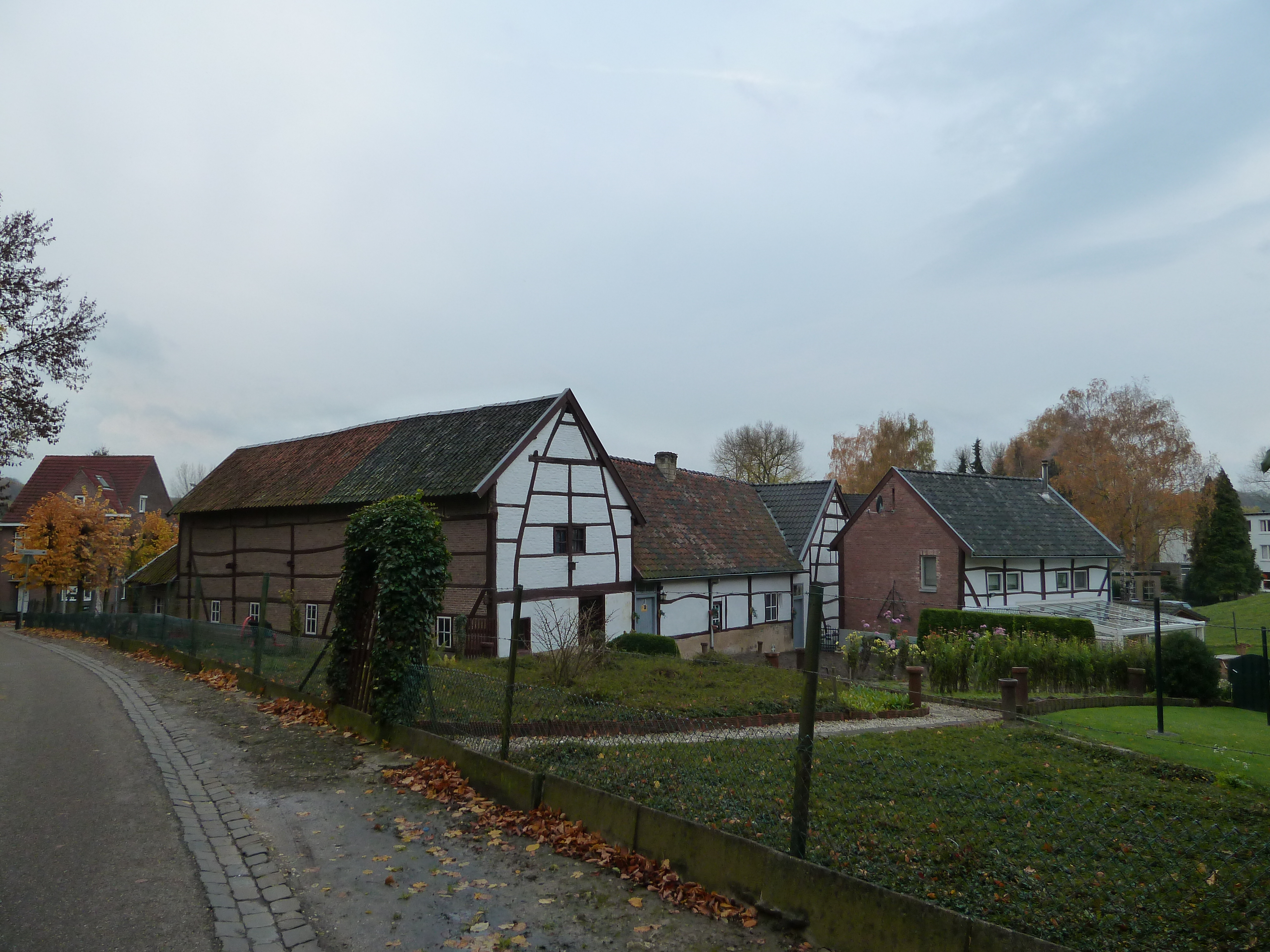
Farm in Schin op Geul

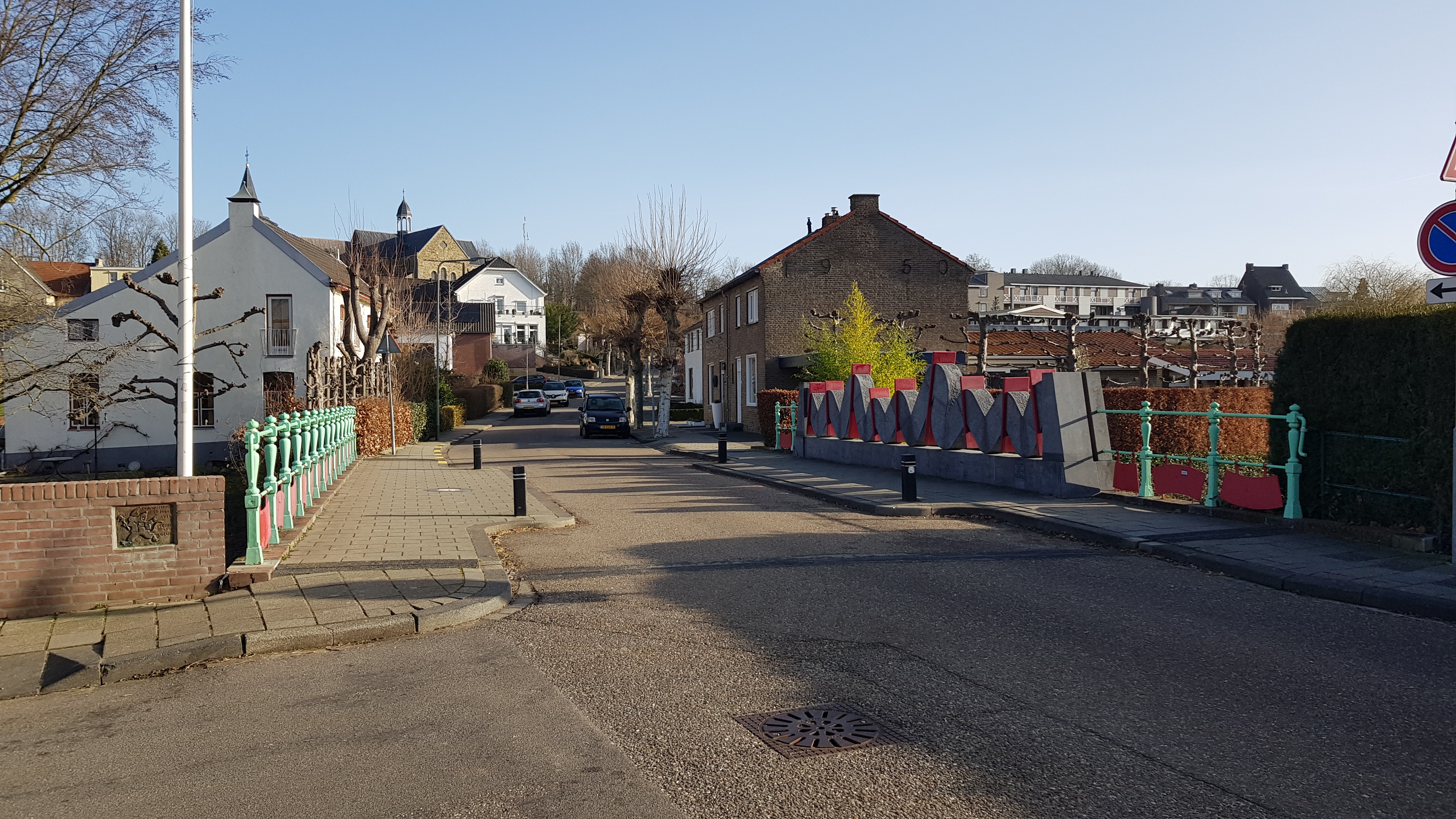
Street view

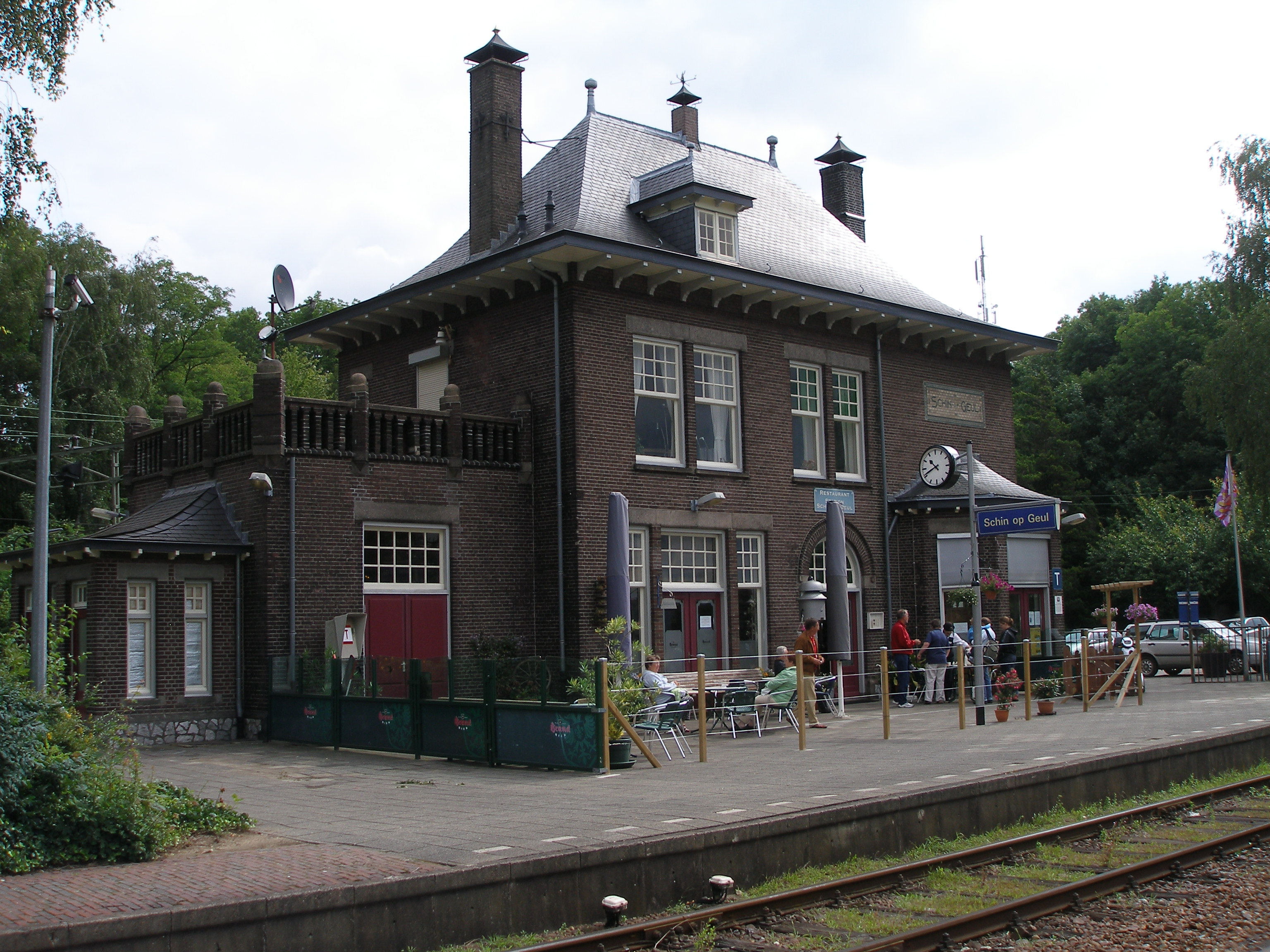
Railway station

== Notable people ==
- Frans van Balkom, footballer and manager (1939–2015)
- Hans Coumans, painter (1943–1986)
