= Linux Bier Wanderung =

The Linux Beer Hike (a.k.a. "LBW") is a week-long event which takes place in a different European country each summer, drawing together open-source software enthusiasts from more than a dozen countries, for a combination of talks, presentations, hands-on mini-projects, outdoor exercise, and food and drink.

The name Linux Bier Wanderung comes from the fact that the first event was held in Pottenstein in Germany (in 1999) in the form of a traditional German "Bierwanderung" for Linux enthusiasts. Since then the event has been held at the following locations:

- 1999: Pottenstein, Germany
- 2000: Coniston, England
- 2001: Bouillon, Belgium
- 2002: Doolin, Ireland
- 2003: Tajov, Slovakia
- 2004: Schin op Geul, Netherlands
- 2005: Killin, Scotland
- 2006: Palūšė, Lithuania
- 2007: Hersonissos, Greece. LBW was organised by Hellenic Linux User Group, and was held on 2–9 September 2007.
- 2008: Samnaun, Switzerland (9–17 August)
- 2009: Helmbrechts, Germany
- 2010: Alfriston, Sussex, England
- 2011: Tux-Lanersbach, Austria
- 2012: Diksmuide, Belgium
- 2013: Castleton, England
- 2014: Talybont-on-Usk, Wales
- 2015: Wiltz, Luxembourg
- 2016: Laxey, Isle of Man
- 2017: St. Martin in Passeier, Italy
- 2018: Jedovnice, Czech Republic
- 2019: Craven Arms, England (12–18 August 2019)
- 2020: Kronberg, Germany (30 August – 5 September 2020) (cancelled due to COVID-19) and Virtual
- 2021: Virtual (21 June 2021)
- 2022: Virtual (19 -24 June 2022) and Leamington Spa, England (10–11 August 2022) (not a full LBW)
- 2023: Harrachov, Czech Republic (19–26 August 2023)
- 2024: Watermillock, England (4–10 August 2024)
- 2025: Blair Atholl, Scotland (4-11 October 2025)
