= Jedovnice =

- Market town
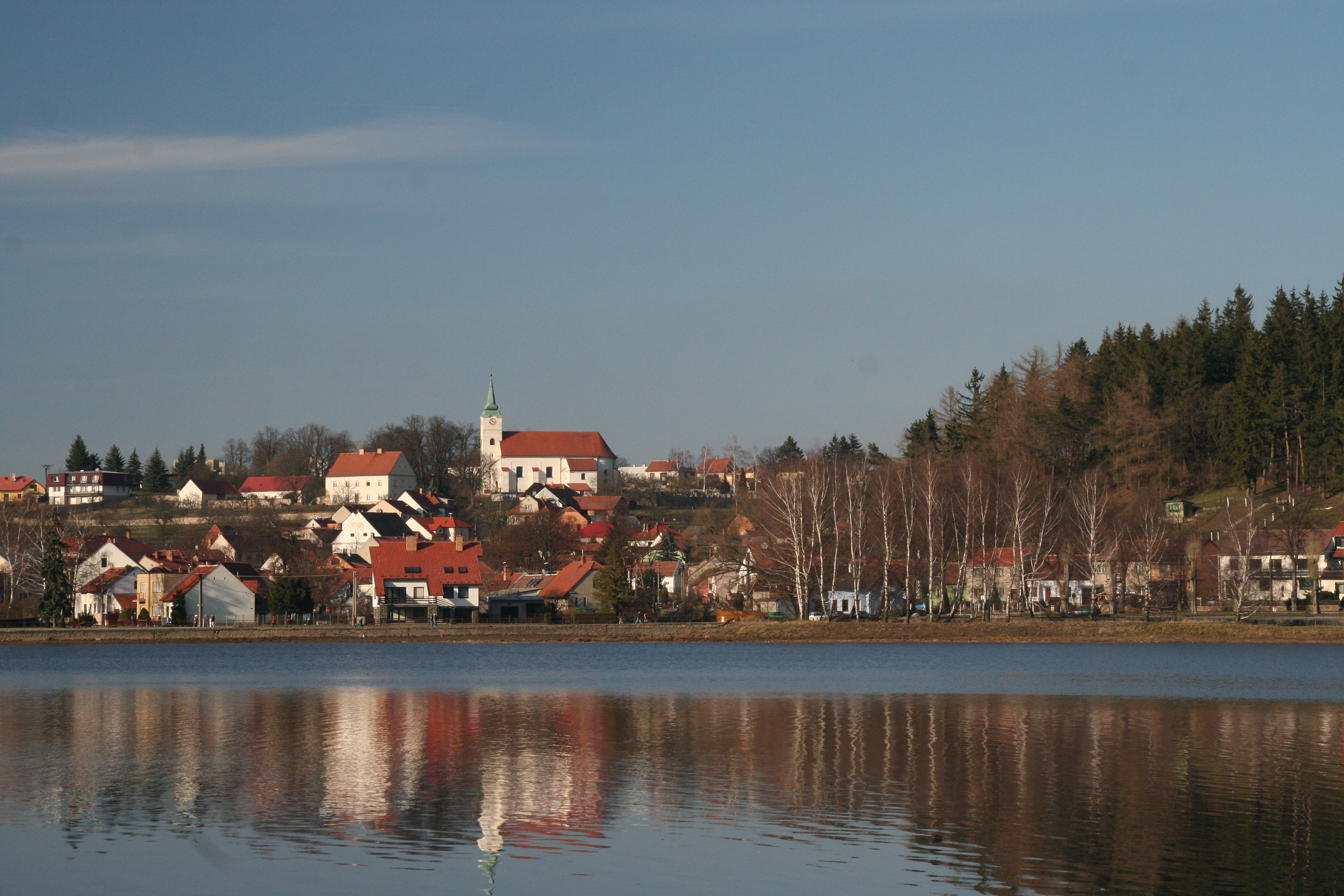
- View across the Olšovec Pond

- Flag Coat of arms

- Location in the Czech Republic
- Coordinates: 49°20′40″N 16°45′22″E
- Country: Czech Republic
- Region: South Moravian
- District: Blansko
- First mentioned: 1251

Area
  - Total: 14.24 km^{2} (5.50 sq mi)
- Elevation: 470 m (1,540 ft)

Population (2026-01-01)
  - Total: 2,947
  - Density: 207.0/km^{2} (536.0/sq mi)
- Time zone: UTC+1 (CET)
  - Summer (DST): UTC+2 (CEST)
- Postal code: 679 06
- Website: www.jedovnice.cz

Jedovnice (Czech pronunciation: [ˈjɛdovɲɪtsɛ]) is a market town in Blansko District in the South Moravian Region of the Czech Republic. It has about 2,900 inhabitants.

== Geography ==
Jedovnice is located about 7 kilometres (4 mi) east of Blansko and 16 km (10 mi) northeast of Brno. It lies in the Drahany Highlands. A small western part of the municipal territory lies in the Moravian Karst Protected Landscape Area. The eastern part of the territory comprises the Rakovec Nature Reserve.

Jedovnice lies on the stream Jedovnický potok with a set of fishponds. The largest of the ponds is Olšovec, which borders the built-up area. The pond was first mentioned in 1371. It has an area of 42 hectares (100 acres) and the length of the dam is 641 metres (2,103 ft). It is a major recreation centre.

== History ==
The first written mention of Jedovnice is from 1251. In 1335, the settlement was promoted to a market town. The most important owners of the estate were the Salm family, who acquired Jedovnice in 1743. The founded hammer mills here and contributed to the development of Jedovnice. They owned the market town until the establishment of an independent municipality in 1848.

In the first half of the 20th century, Jedovnice became a popular holiday destination.

== Demographics ==
Historical population

| Year | Pop. | ±% |
|---|---|---|
| 1869 | 1,540 | — |
| 1880 | 1,448 | −6.0% |
| 1890 | 1,483 | +2.4% |
| 1900 | 1,731 | +16.7% |
| 1910 | 1,933 | +11.7% |

| Year | Pop. | ±% |
|---|---|---|
| 1921 | 1,831 | −5.3% |
| 1930 | 1,742 | −4.9% |
| 1950 | 1,760 | +1.0% |
| 1961 | 1,857 | +5.5% |
| 1970 | 1,930 | +3.9% |

| Year | Pop. | ±% |
|---|---|---|
| 1980 | 2,177 | +12.8% |
| 1991 | 2,440 | +12.1% |
| 2001 | 2,487 | +1.9% |
| 2011 | 2,748 | +10.5% |
| 2021 | 2,746 | −0.1% |

Source: Censuses

== Transport ==
There are no railways or major roads passing through the municipality.

== Culture ==
Jedovnice was the venue for the Linux Bier Wanderung in 2018.

== Sights ==
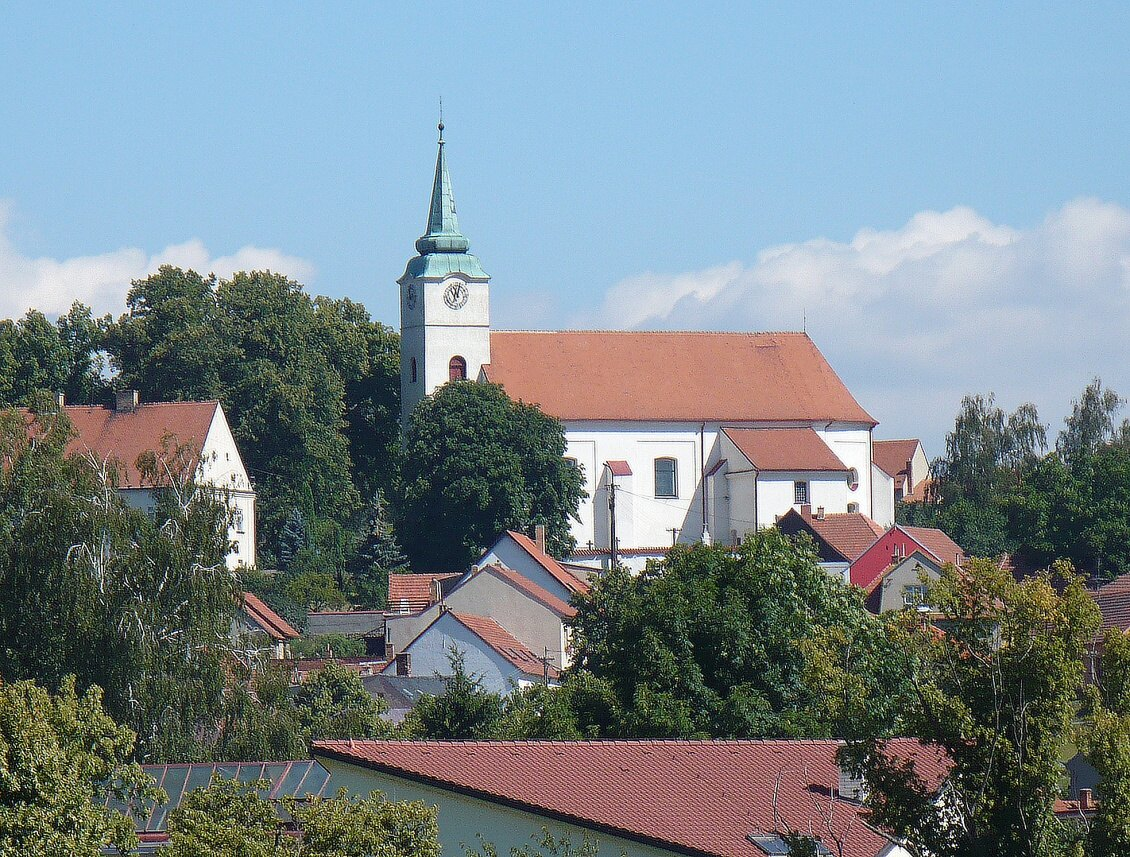
Church of Saints Peter and Paul

The main landmark of Jedovnice is the Church of Saints Peter and Paul. It was built in the current Baroque form in 1783–1785 by extension and reconstruction of the original Gothic building. It is remarkable for the modern interior made by Mikuláš Medek, Jan Koblasa, Josef Istler, Karel Nepraš and Ludvík Kolek in 1963–1976.

== Twin towns – sister cities ==
Jedovnice is twinned with:

- Aschheim, Germany
