= Hans Coumans =

Dutch painter

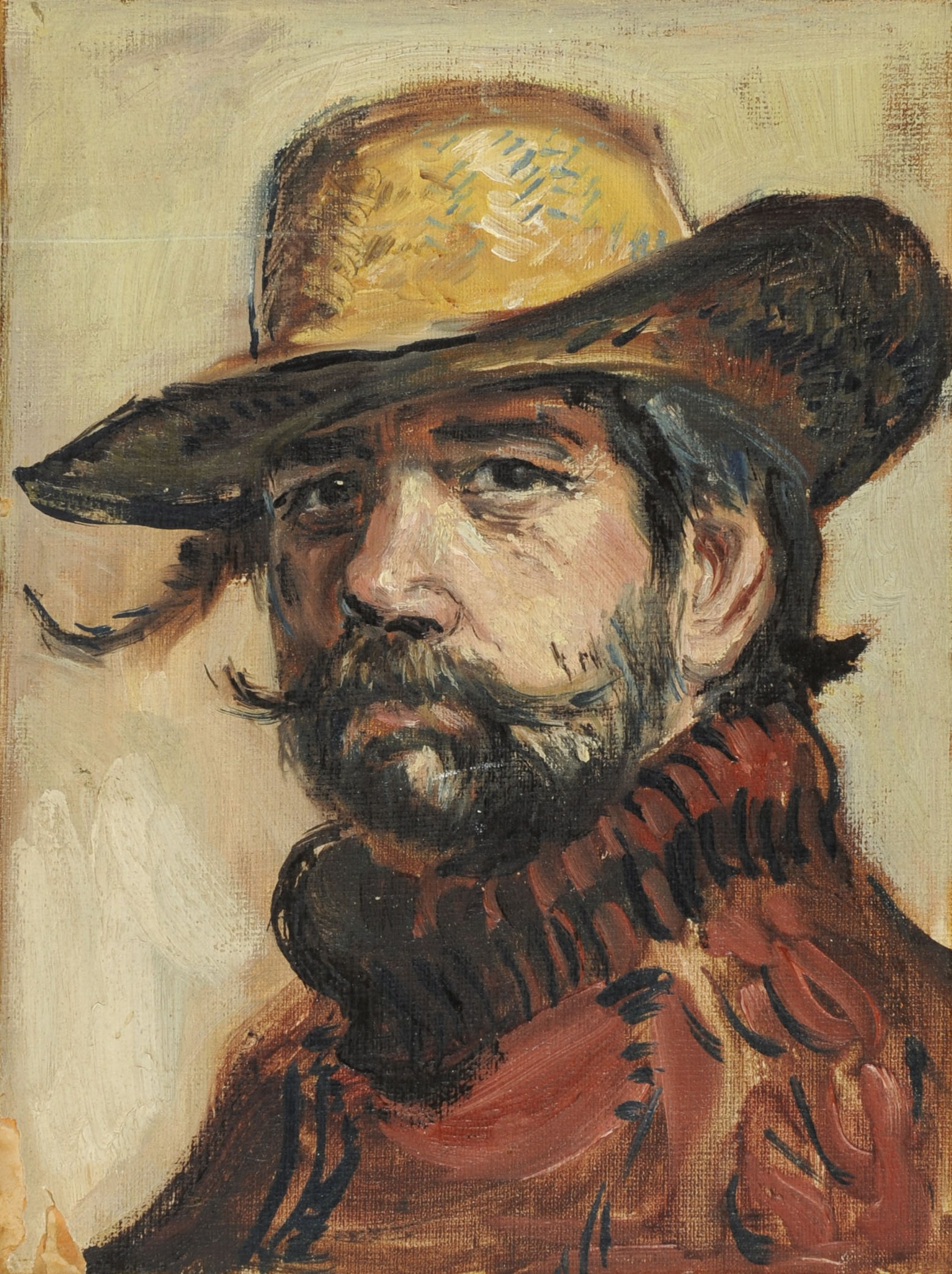
- Self-portrait (1983)
- Born: 19 March 1943; Schin op Geul, Limburg, Netherlands
- Died: 16 November 1986 (aged 43); Heumen, Gelderland, Netherlands
- Education: Maastricht Institute of Arts and Charles Eyck
- Known for: Painting, drawing still life, portraits and landscapes
- Movement: Post-Impressionism

Hans Coumans (19 March 1943 – 16 November 1986) was a Dutch painter active in the South Limburg region, Belgium and Germany. He was self-taught and produced approximately 1700 works. He painted in the Impressionist painting style.

== Biography ==
Coumans was born and grew up in Schin op Geul. Between the ages of 15 and 19 he undertook several long journeys through Germany, Austria, Belgium, France and Spain. In 1961 he joined the touring circus company Toni Boltini for six months, in which he worked as an elephant handler.

Coumans briefly studied at the Maastricht Institute of Arts and briefly studied with visual artist Charles Eyck. He started out as a landscape painter and portraitist, but he earned his living mainly with decorative art, often with the Heuvelland as subject, in dozens of catering companies in Valkenburg aan de Geul and the surrounding area. He also made (charcoal) quick portraits in bars, at fairs and at all kinds of events. In 1965 he moved for a short time to Haarlem and Amsterdam, where he joined the Provo movement. After a few months, he returned to Limburg. In 1969 he went to Spain, where he produced wall scenes in Benidorm, Lloret de Mar and Calella de la Costa. He returned to Valkenburg because of problems with payments. There he married Christine van Kempen in 1970. From that moment on, he mainly made paintings of the Limburg hills. In 1976 he moved to Nuth and in 1981 to Bingelrade.

Coumans died in 1986 as a result of a car accident.

== Painting style ==
Coumans' style can be classified under Post-Impressionism. His contemporaries worked on abstract and conceptual art, but Coumans painted outside the mainstream and was mainly inspired by nature. His oeuvre includes landscapes, village scenes (cultural heritage), still lifes, quickly painted portraits and socially critical works.

== Works ==
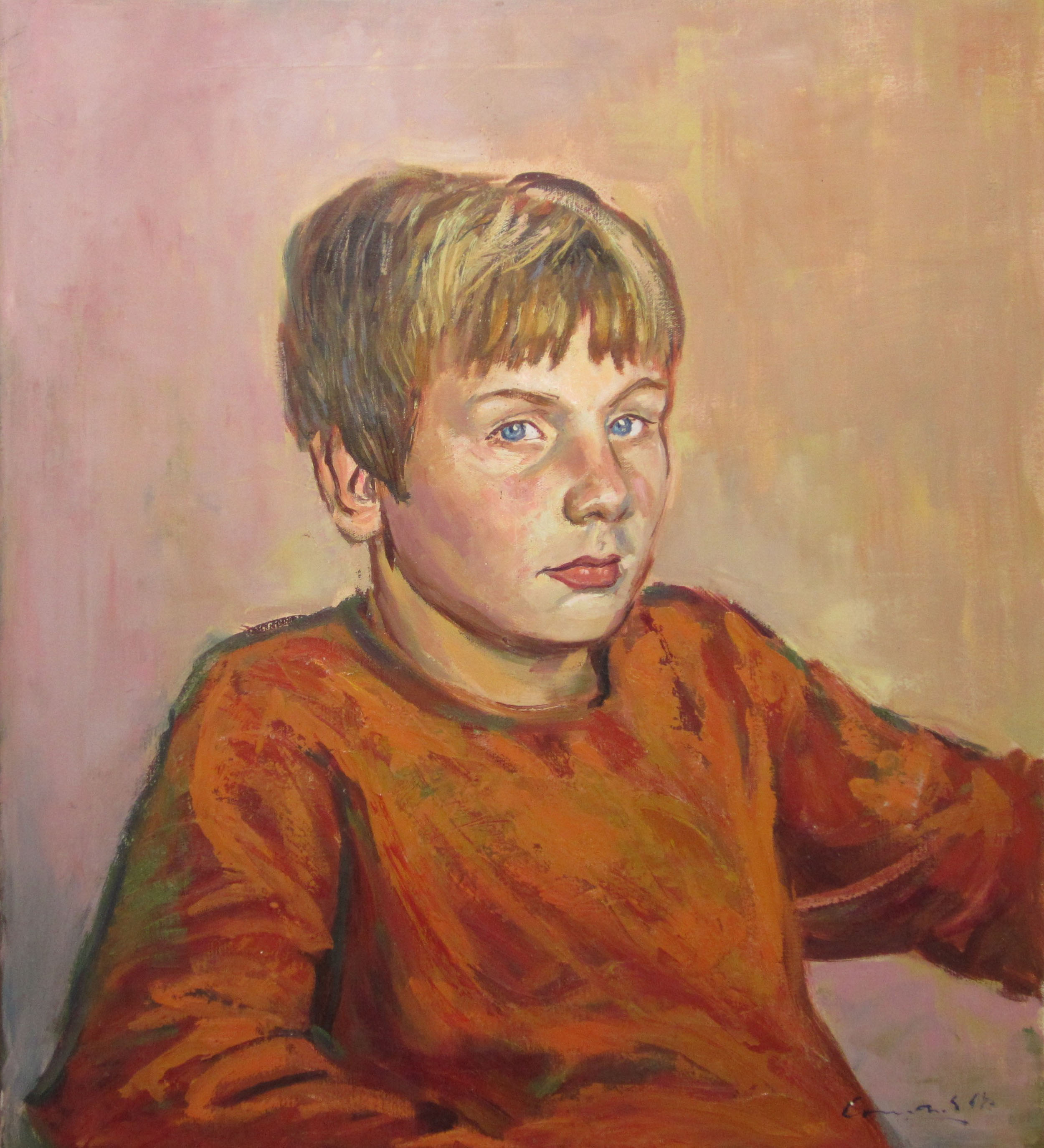
Portrait of a Boy (1968)

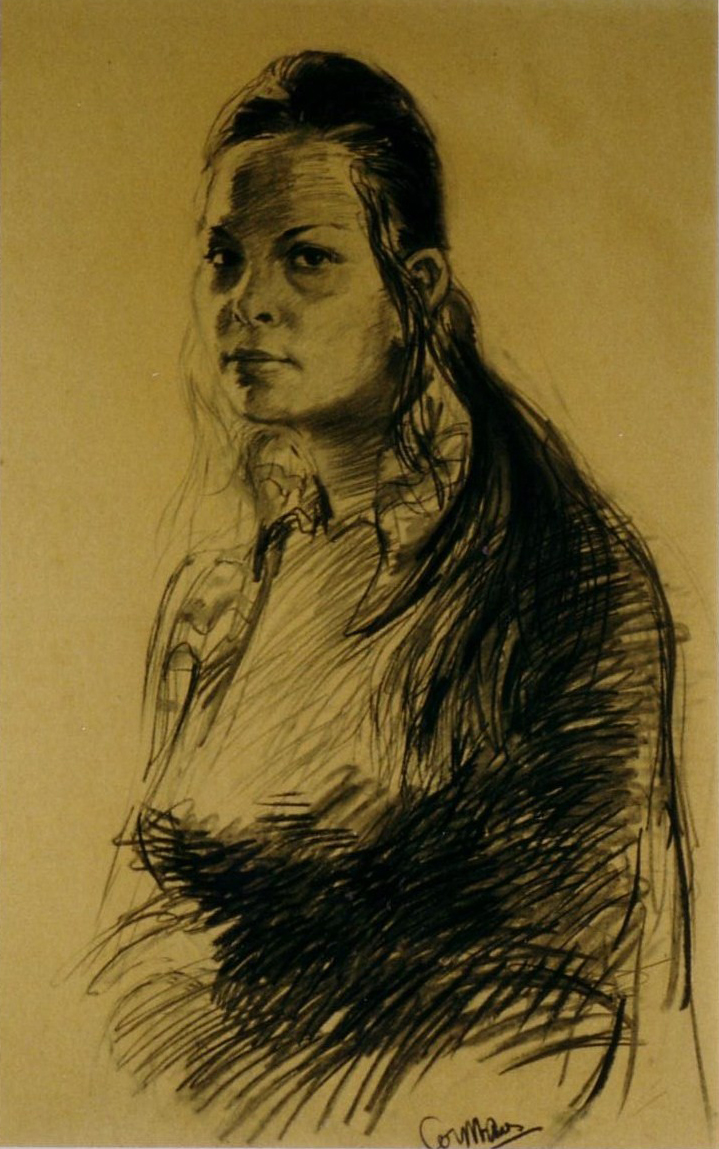
'Portrait of Christine (1971)

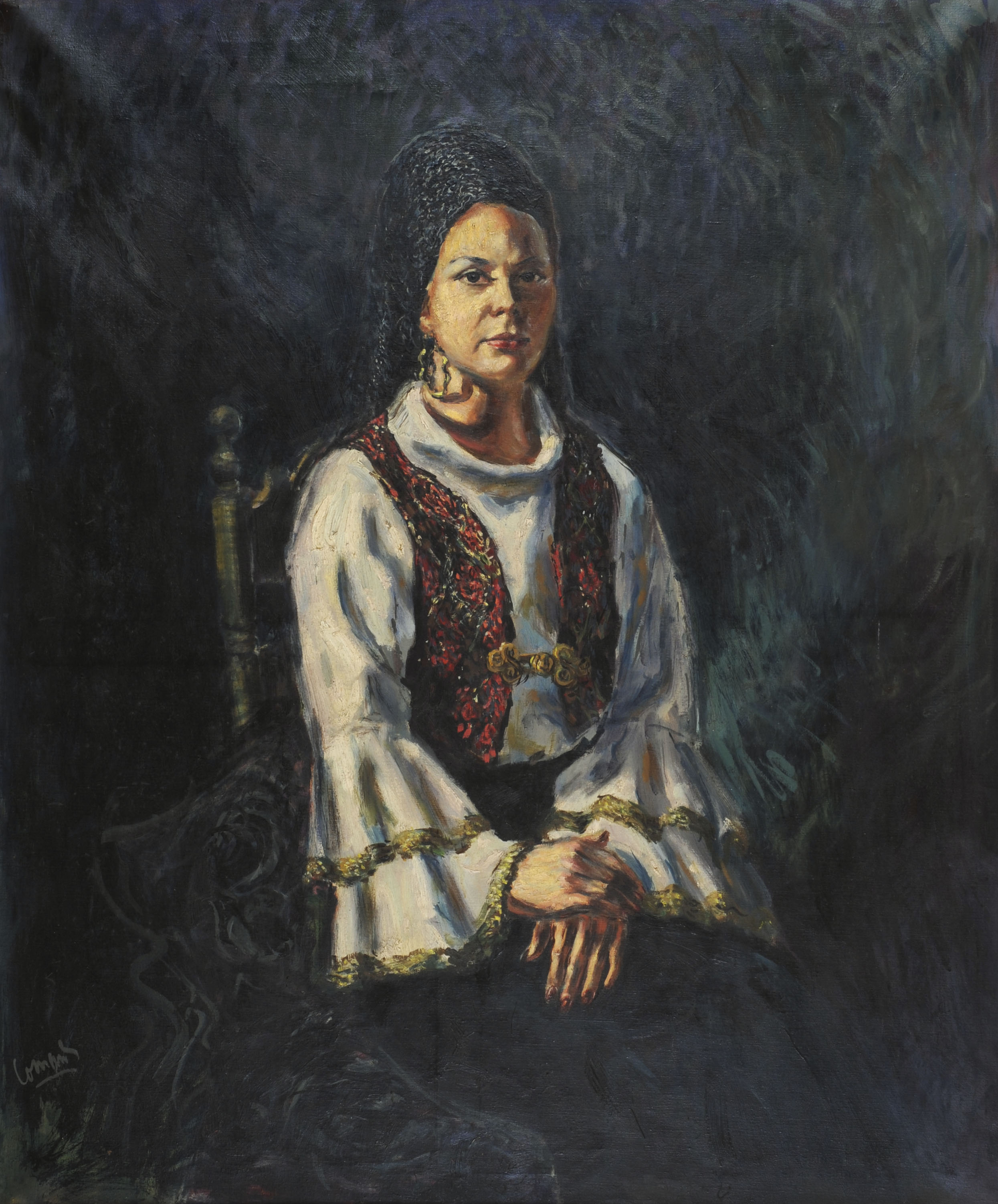
Portrait of Christine (1973)

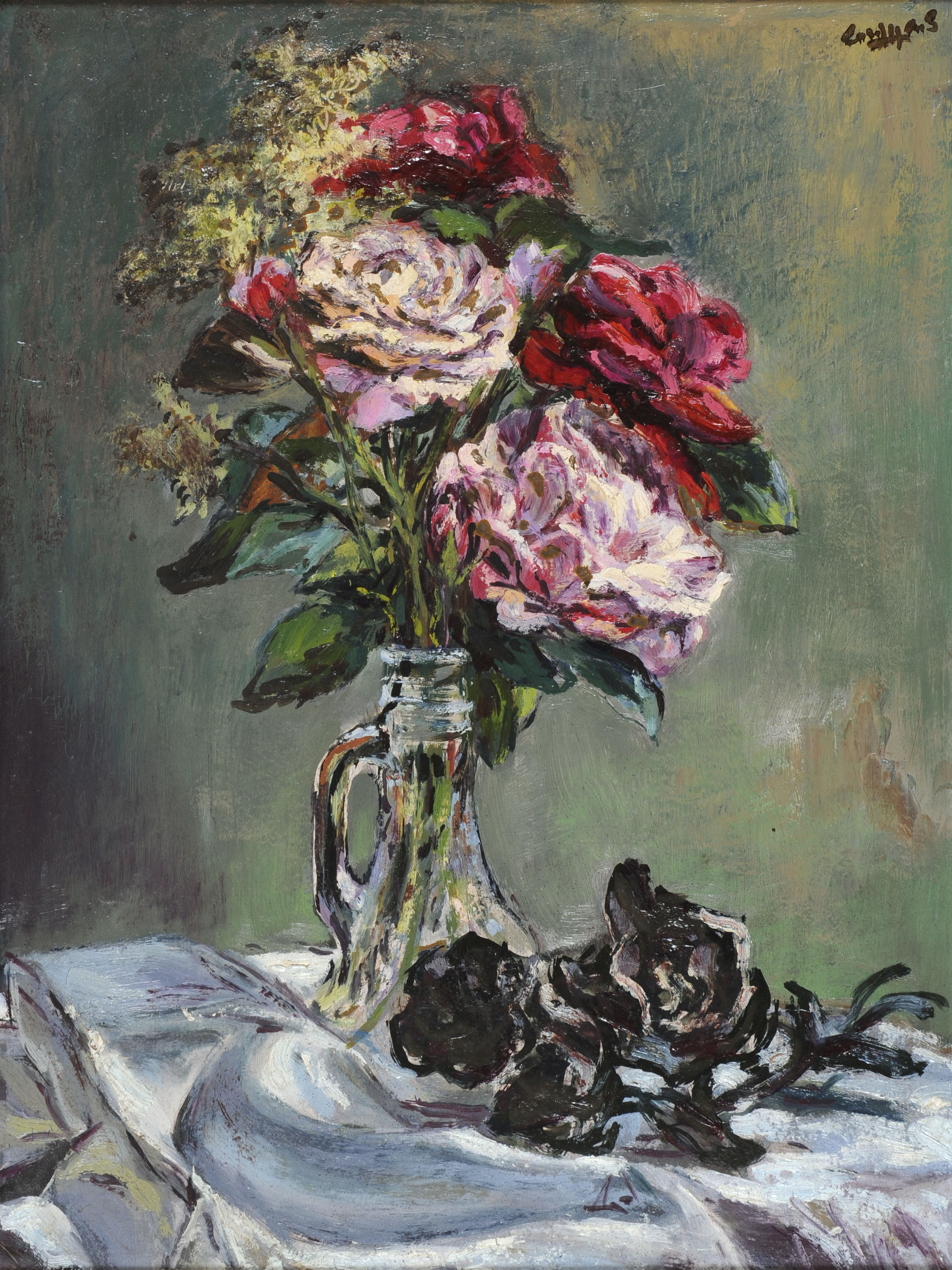
Bunch of Flowers (1973)

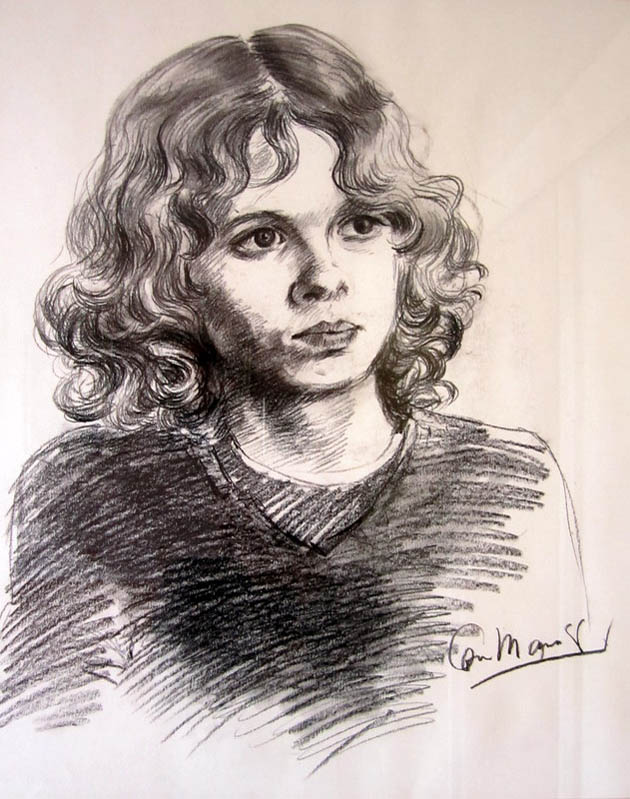
Portrait of a Girl (1974)

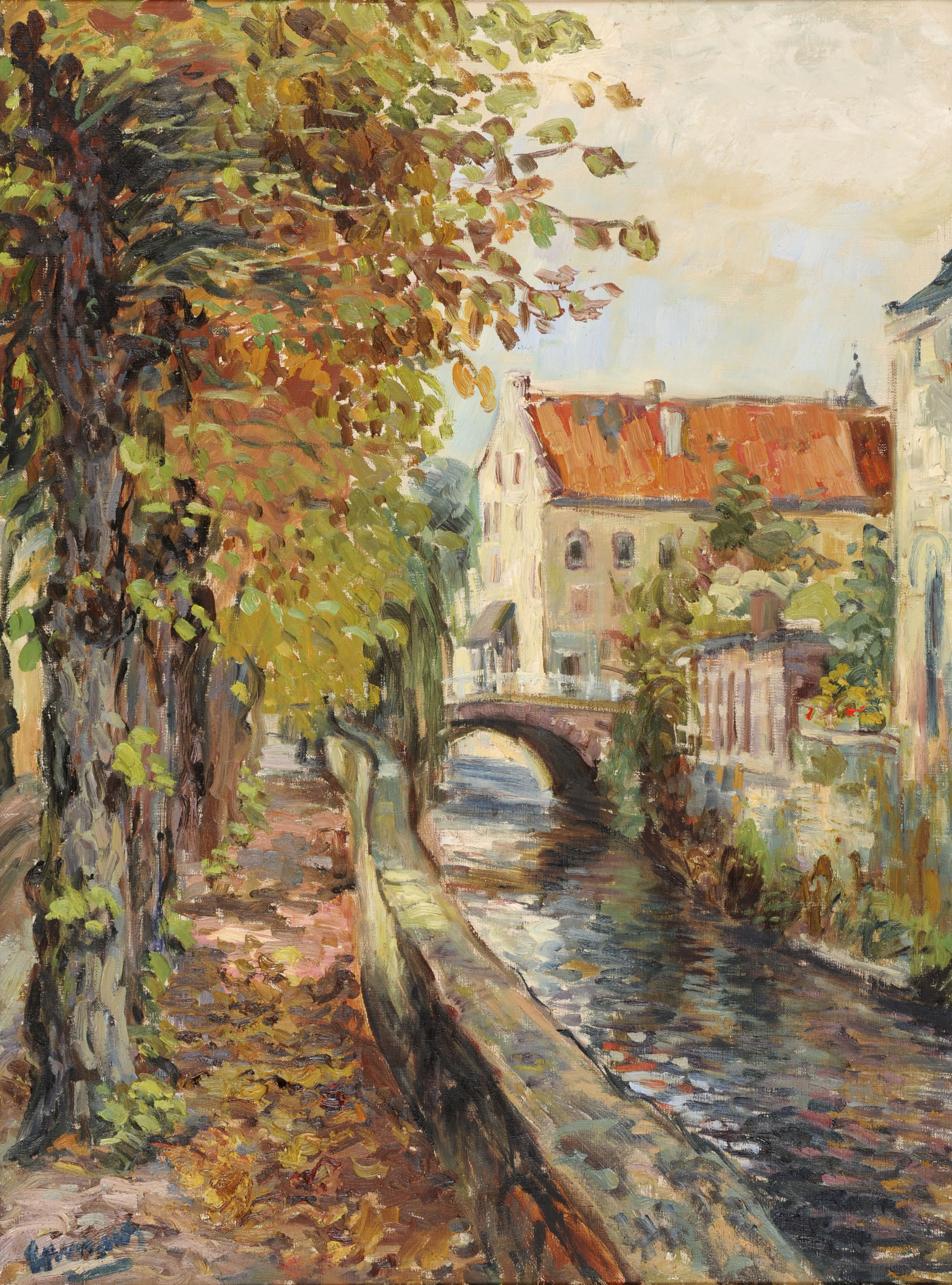
View of the Channel Valkenburg (1974)

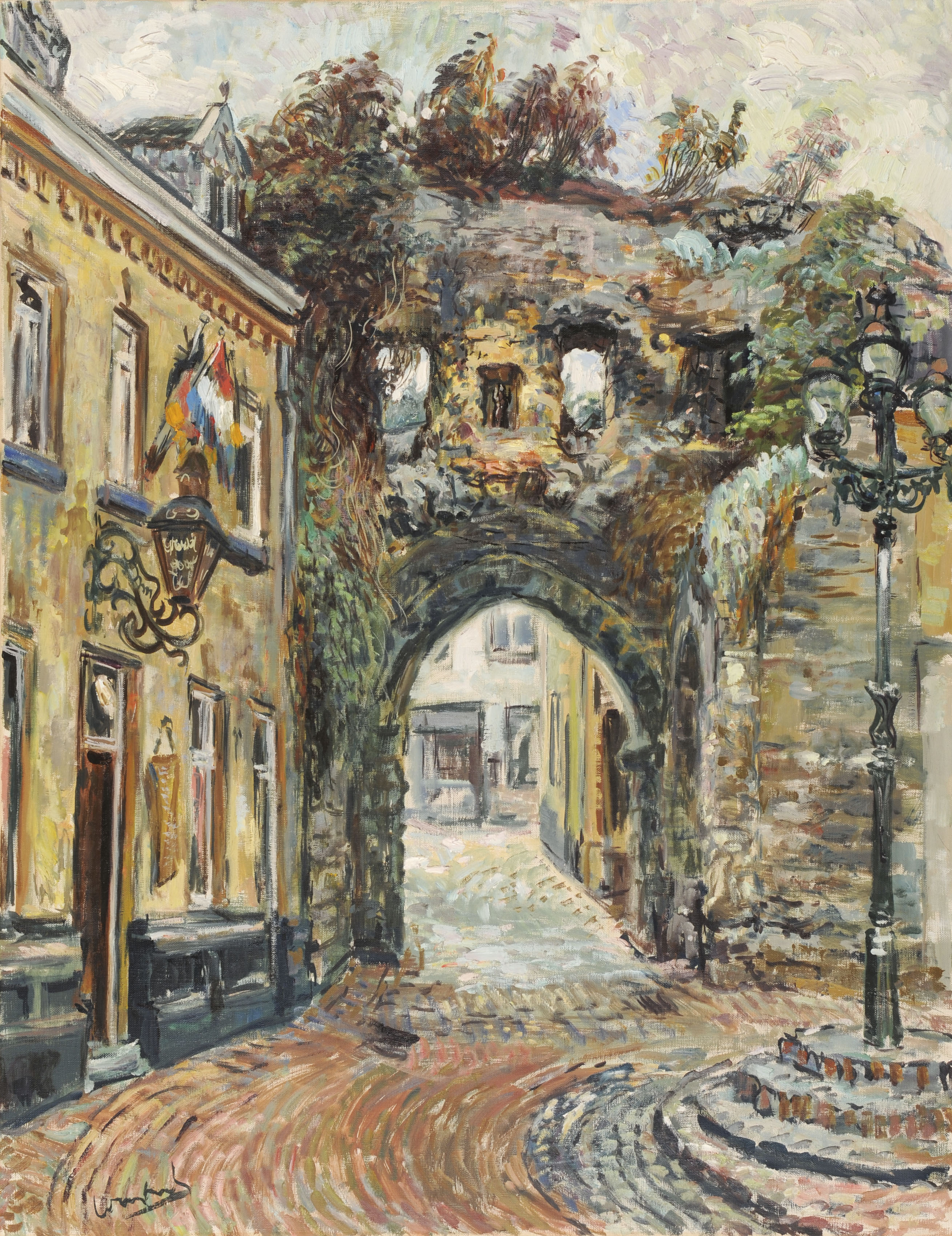
Grendelpoort Valkenburg (1975)

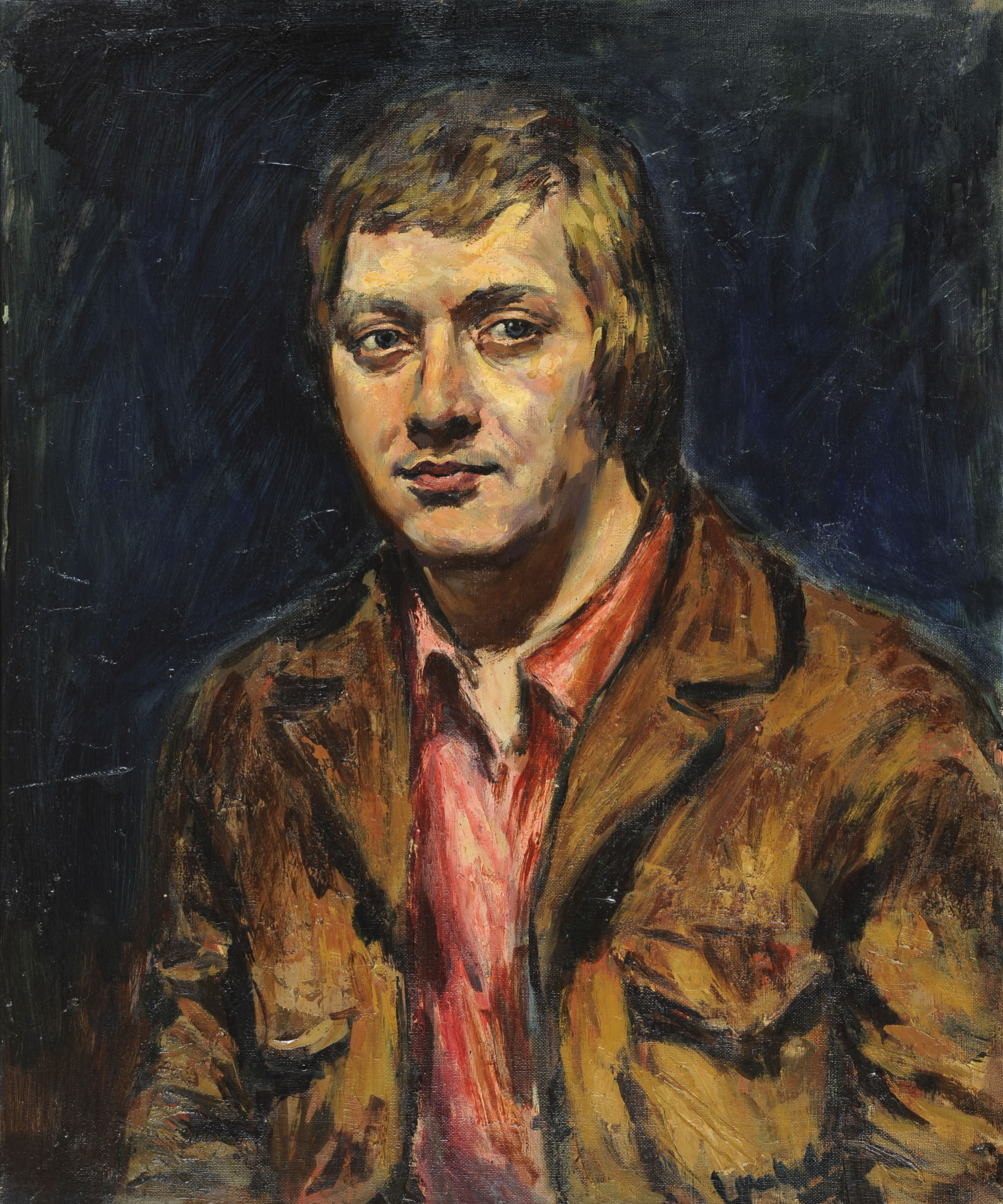
Portrait of a Man (1977)

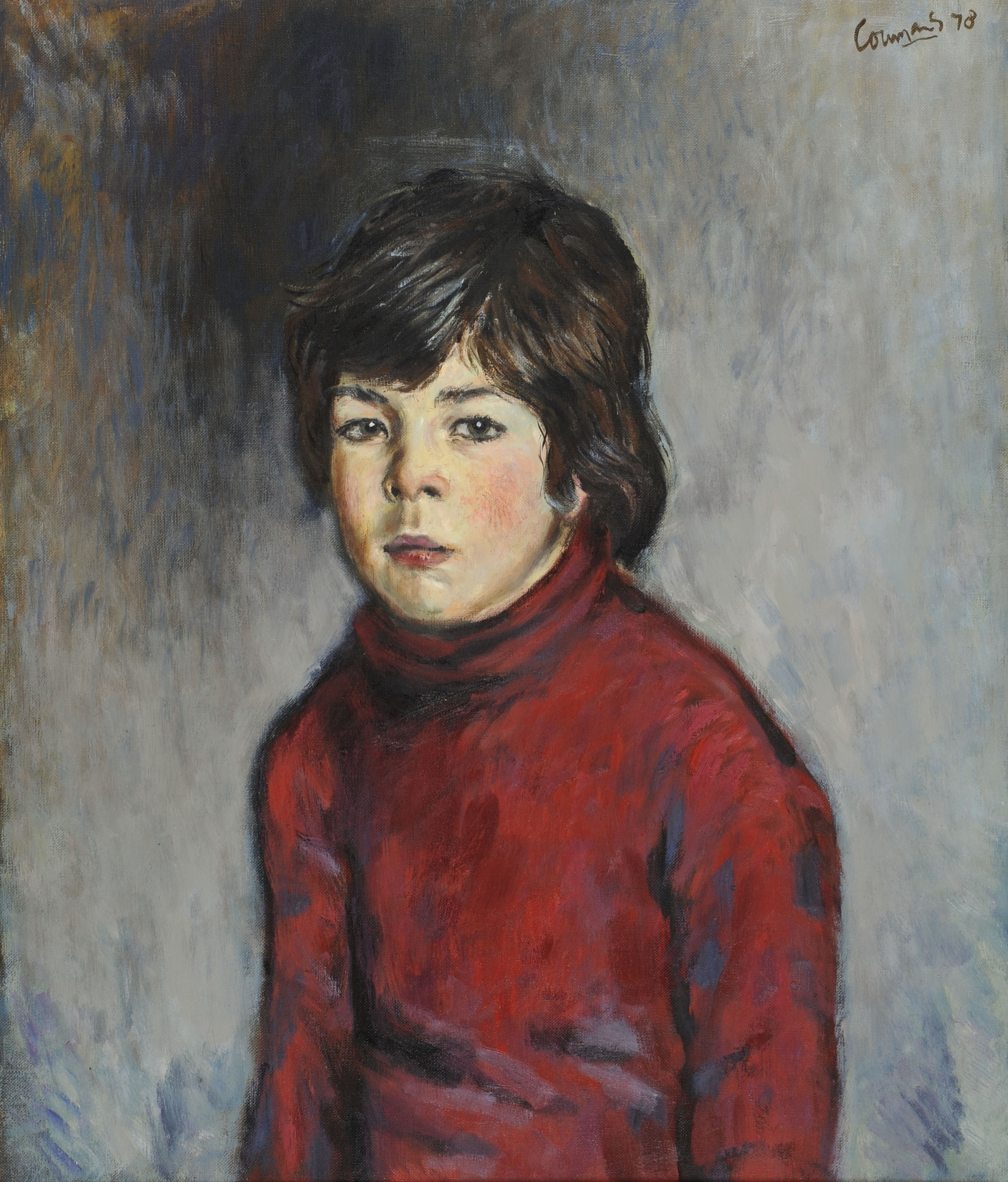
Portrait of a Boy (1978)

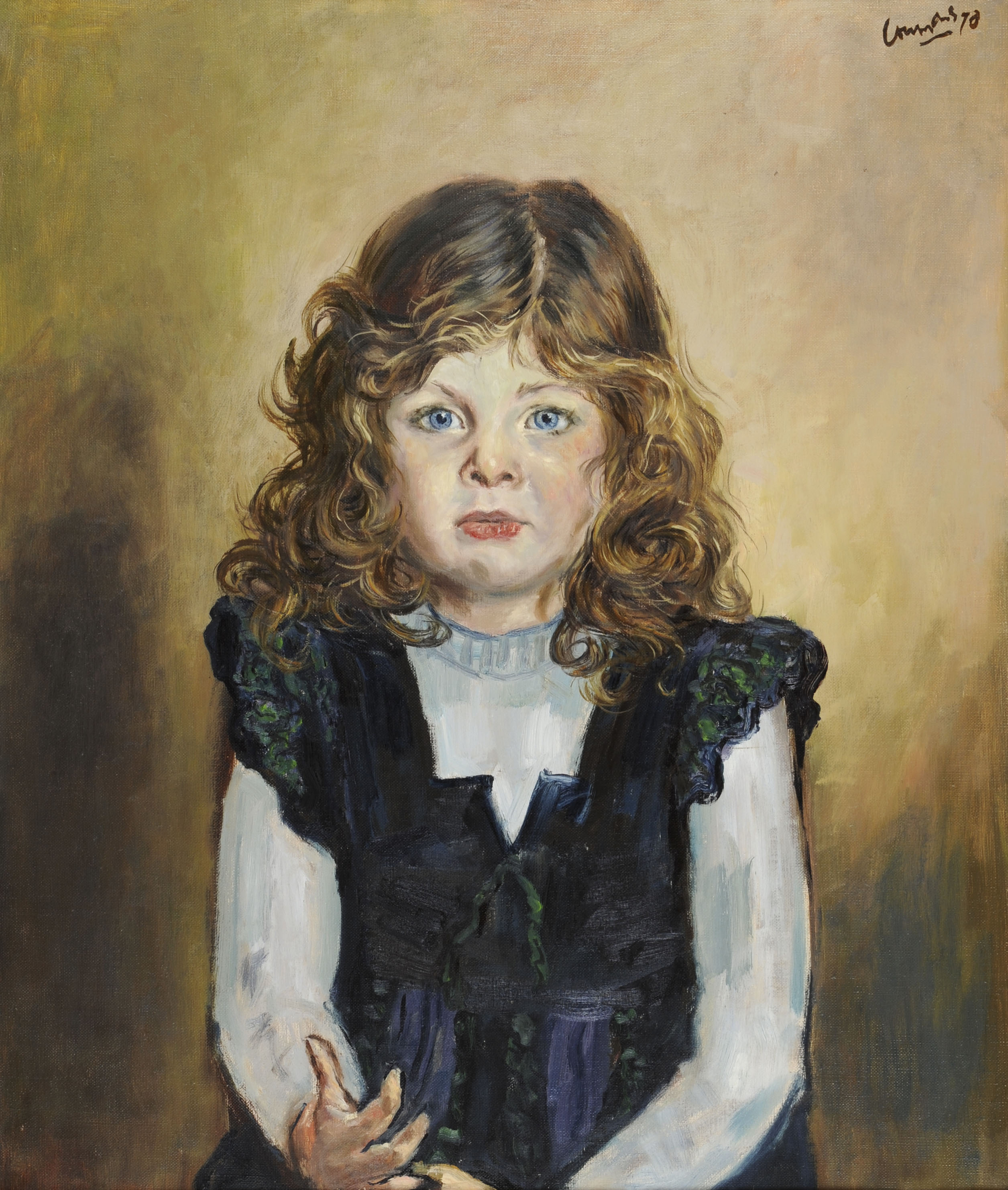
Portrait of a Girl (1978)

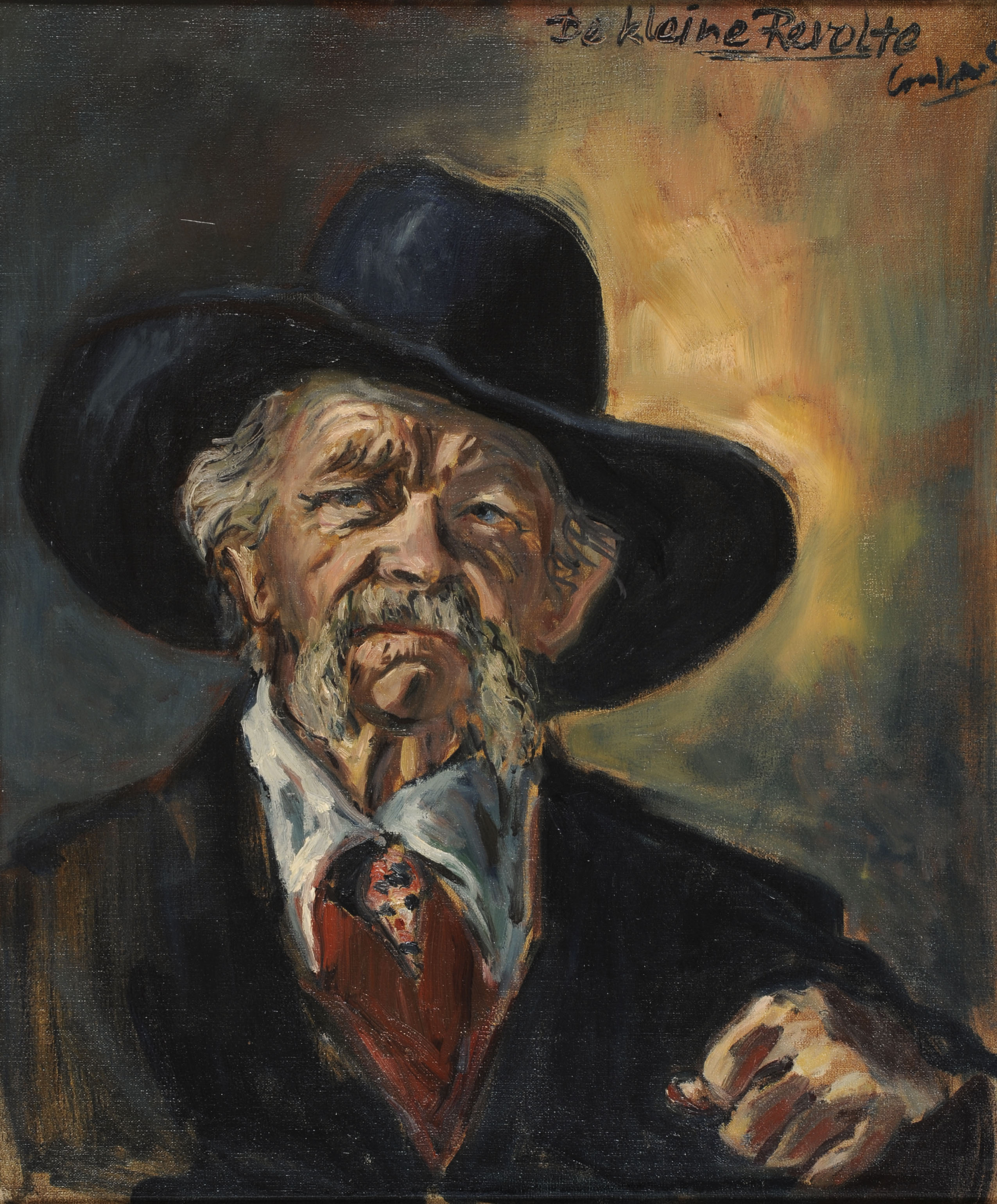
Portrait "The Little Revolt" (1979)

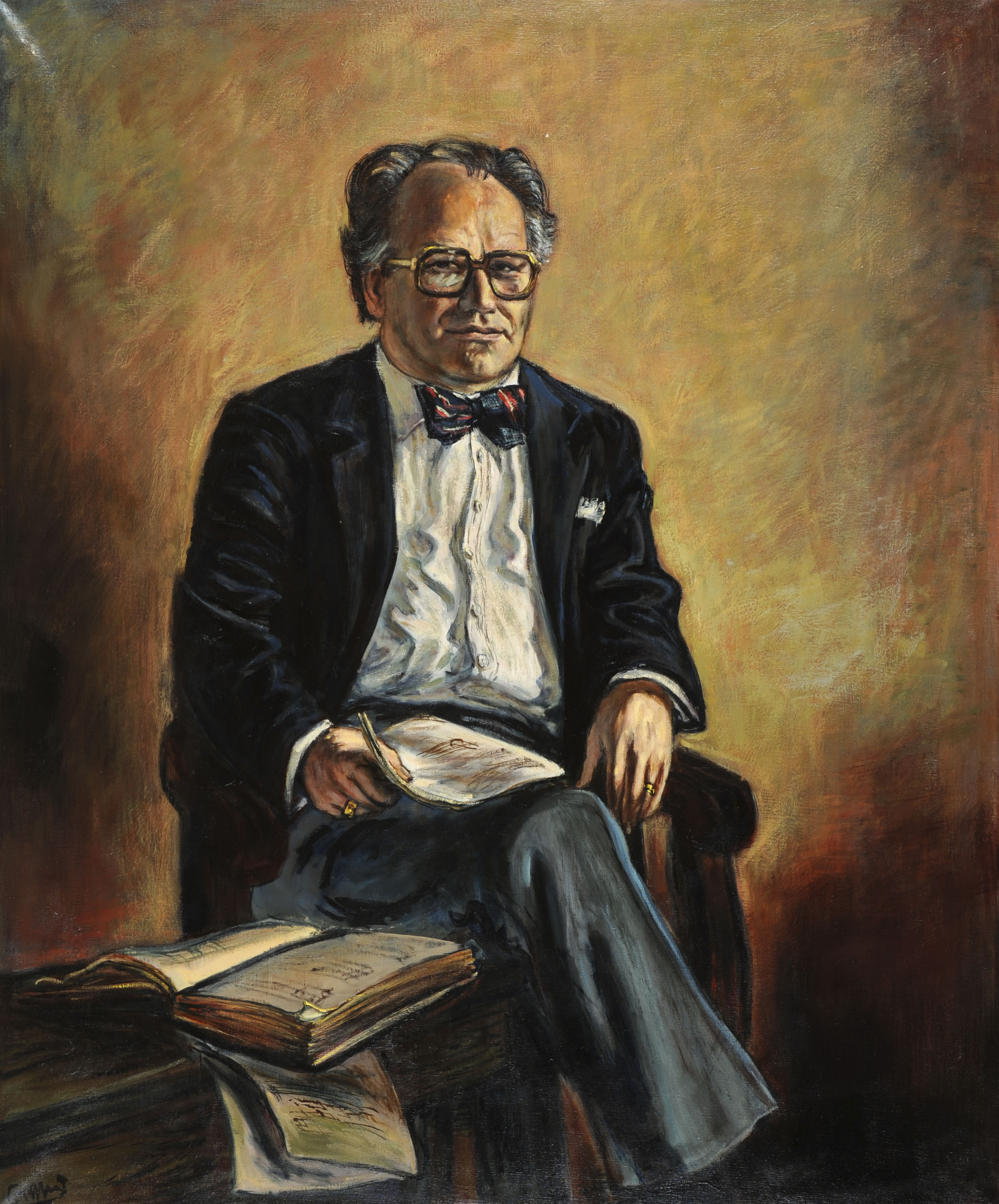
Portrait of a Man (1979)

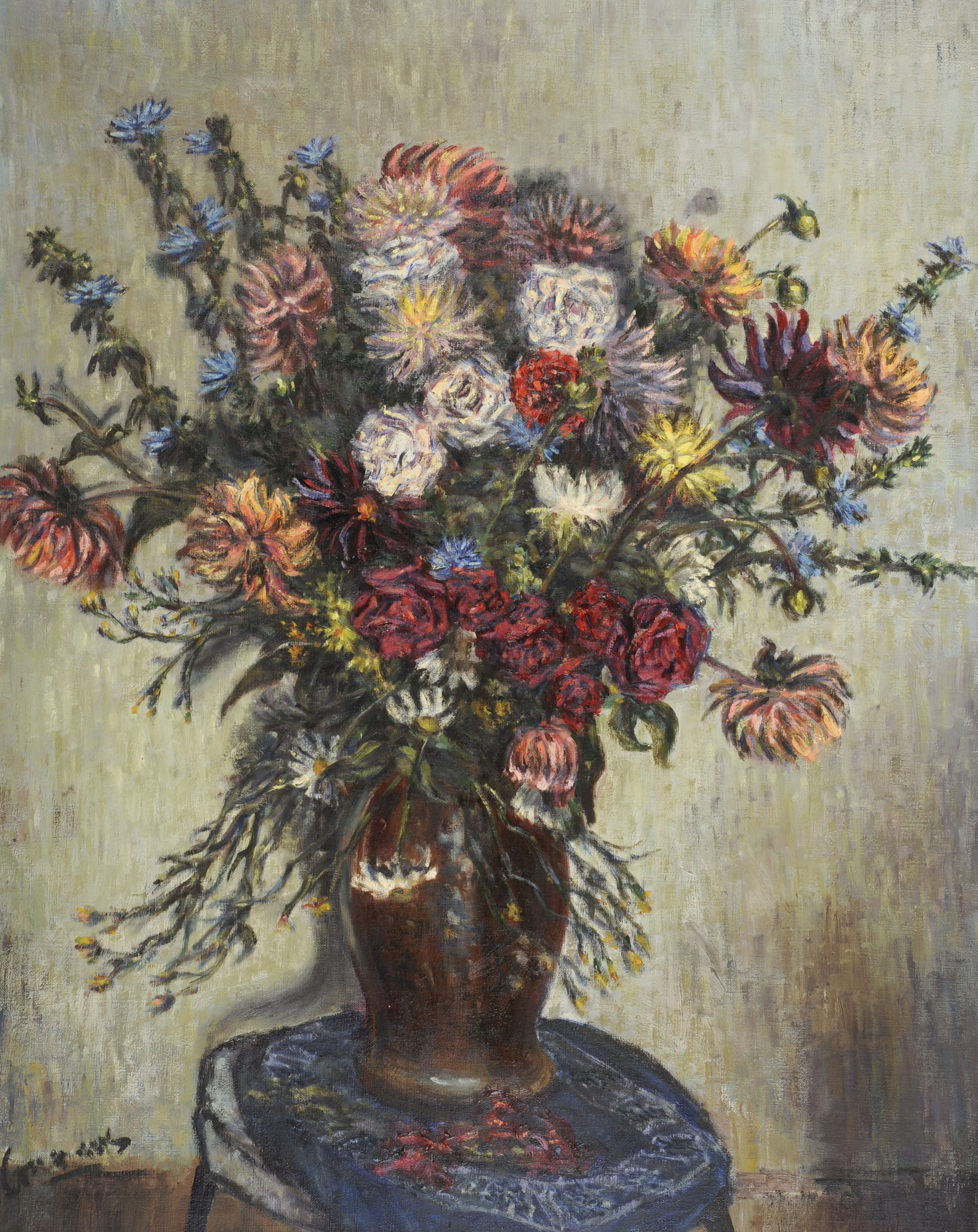
Bouquet (1979)

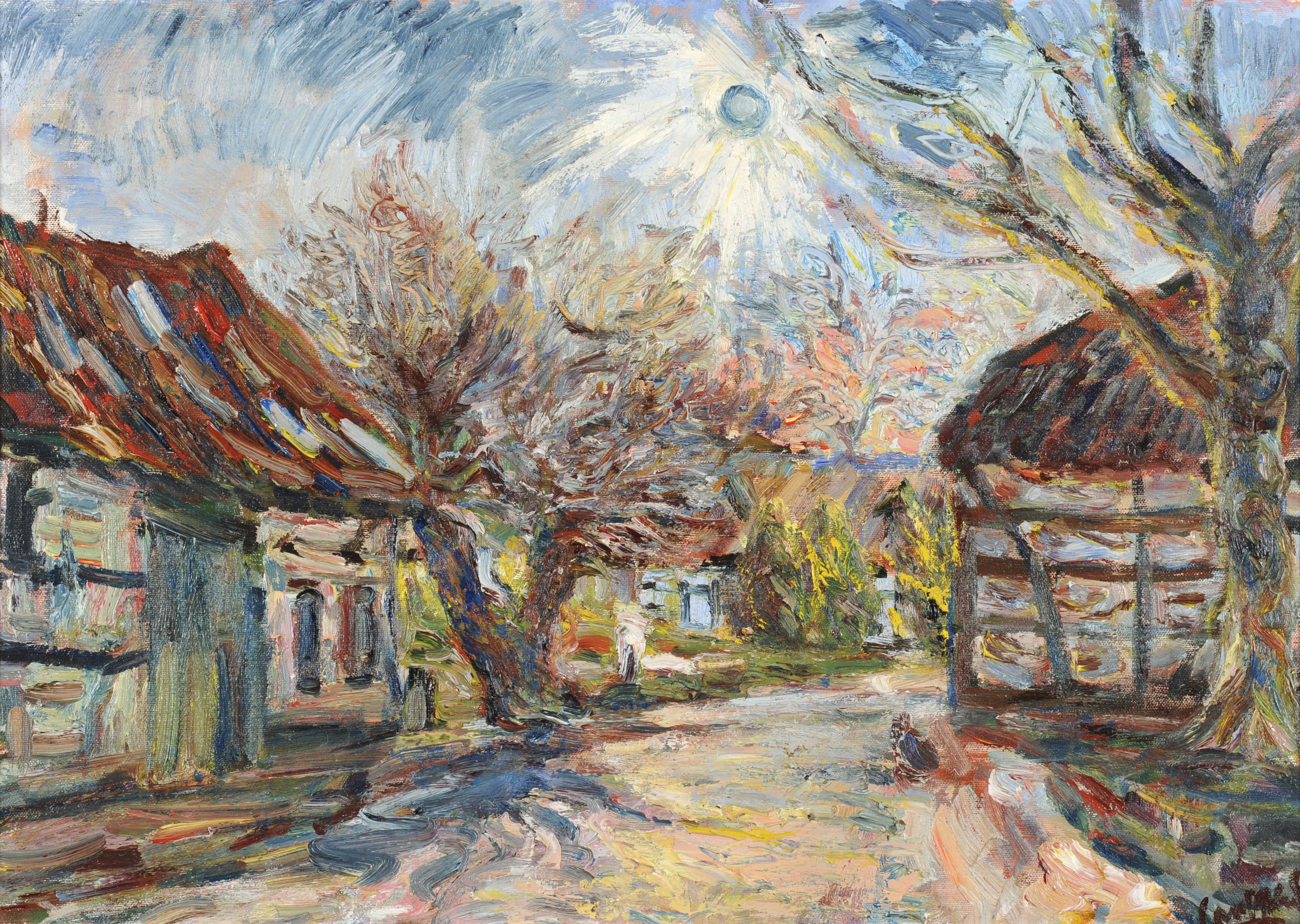
Terstraten (1982)

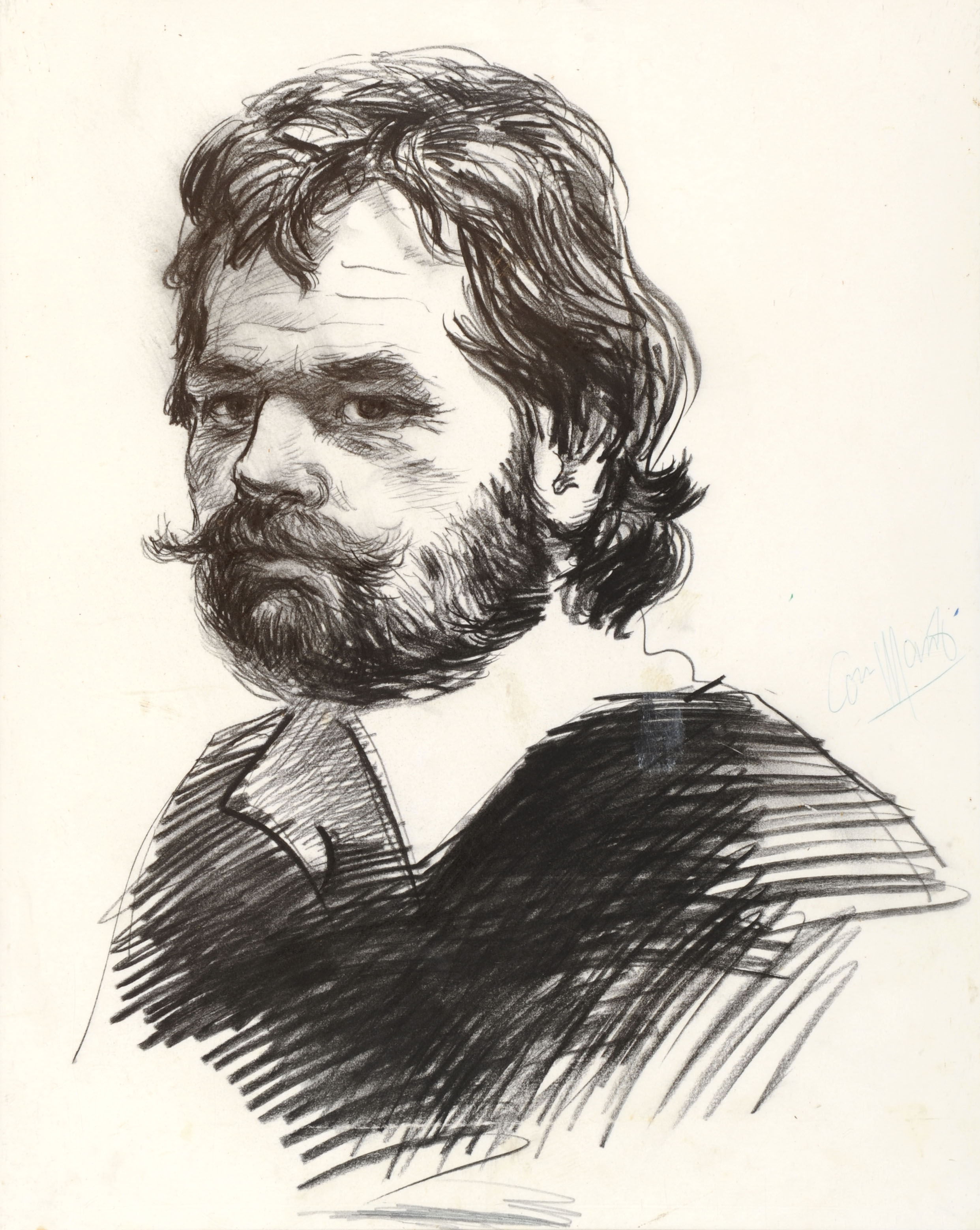
Self-portrait (1983)

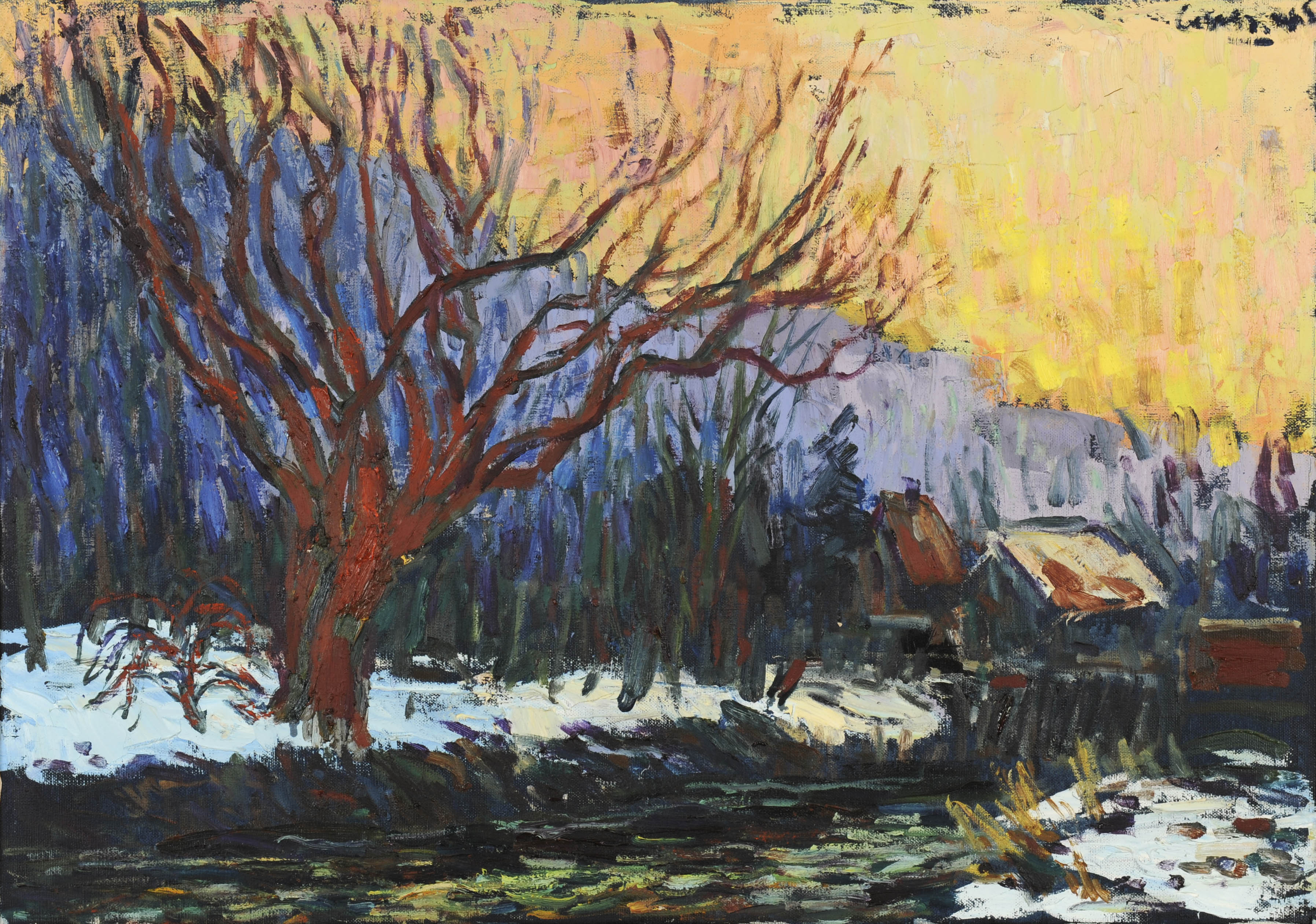
Winter Landscape (1983)

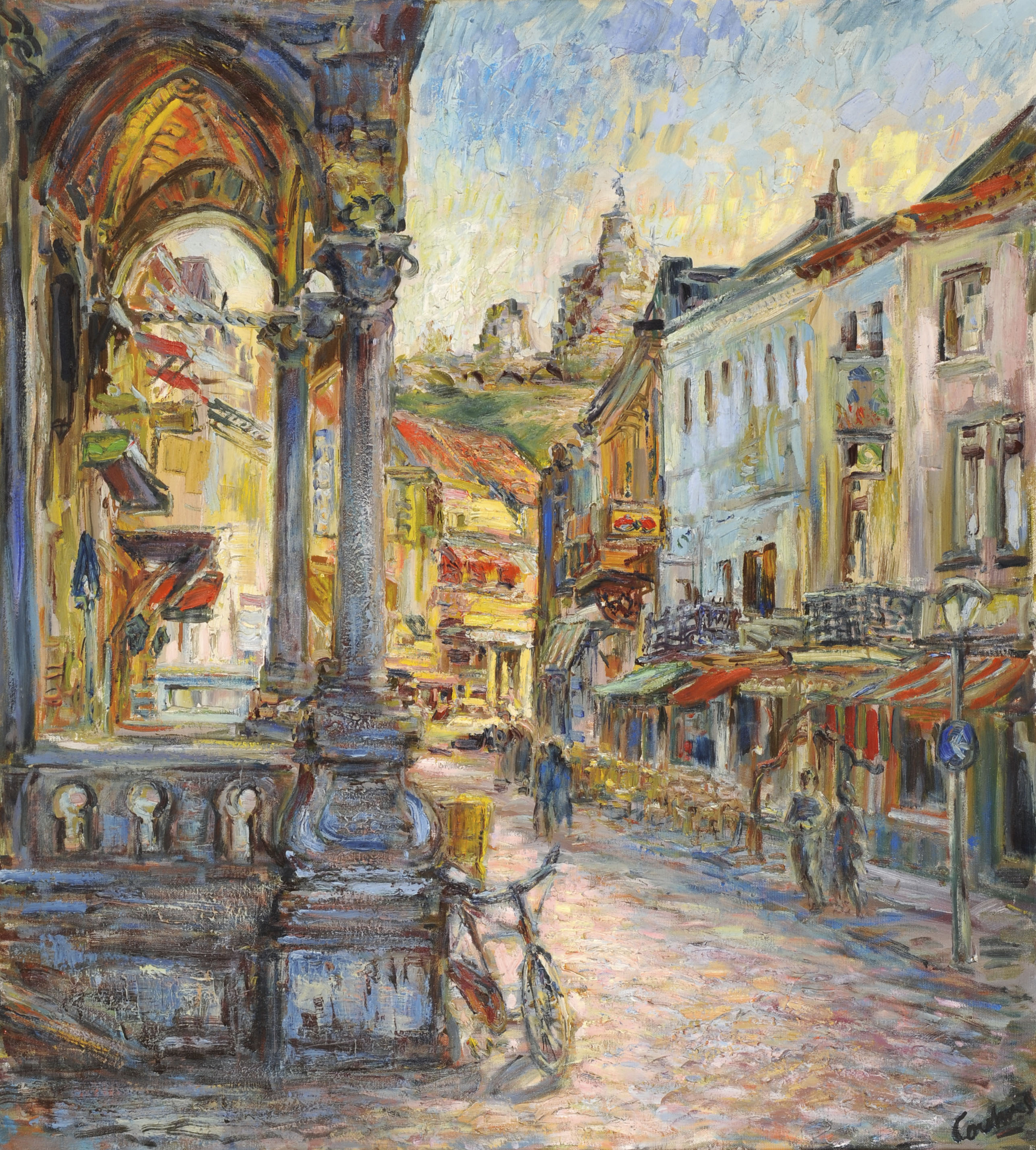
Main Street Valkenburg (1983)

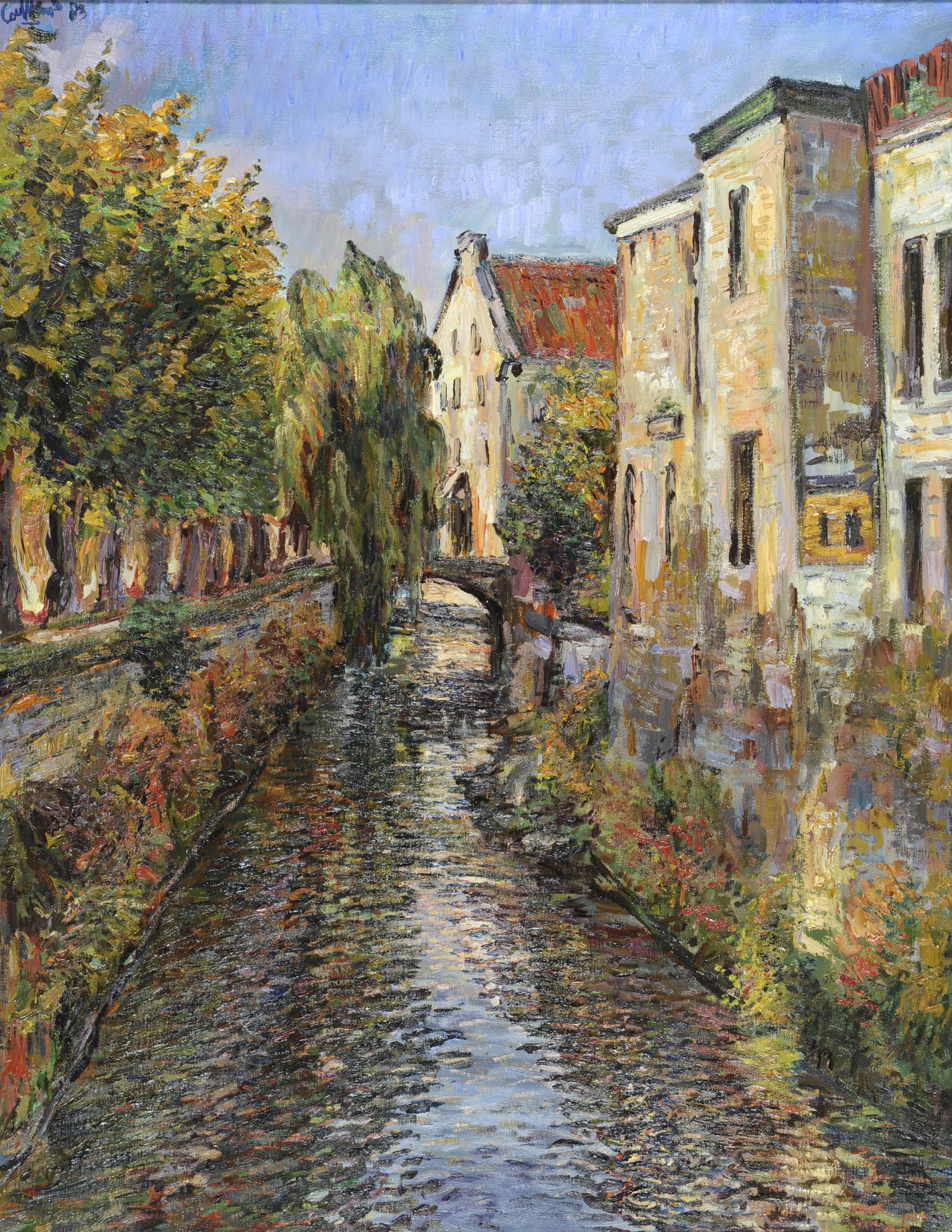
View of the Channel Valkenburg (1983)

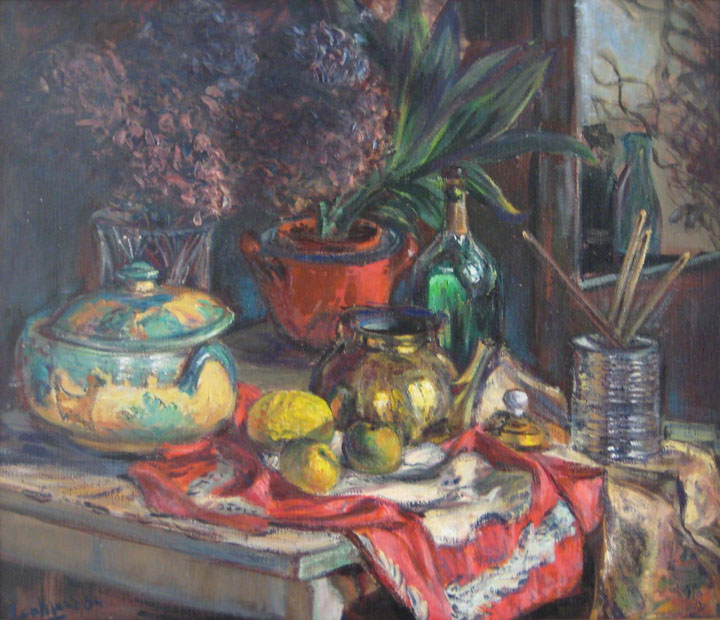
Still life (1983)

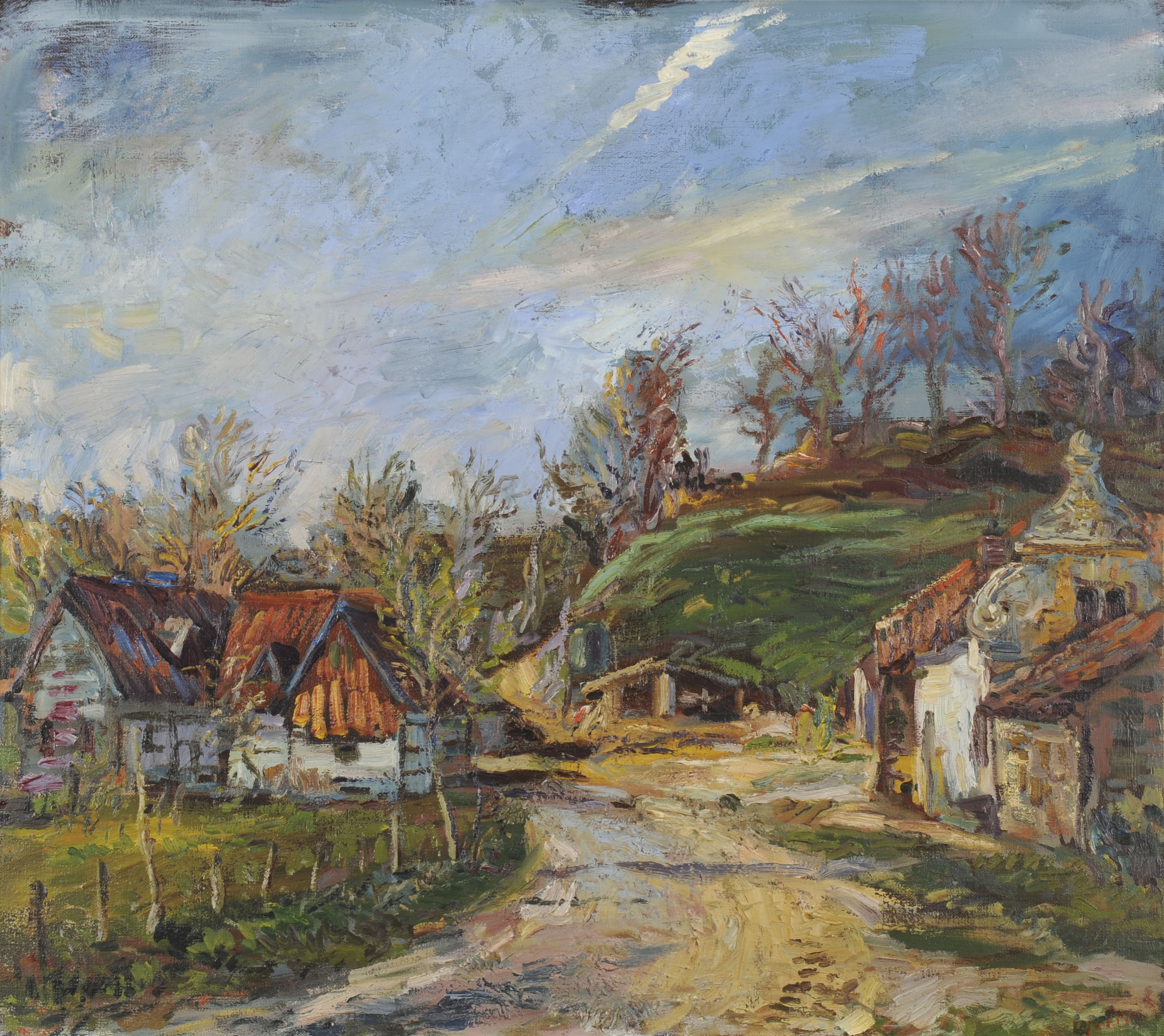
Terstraten (1984)

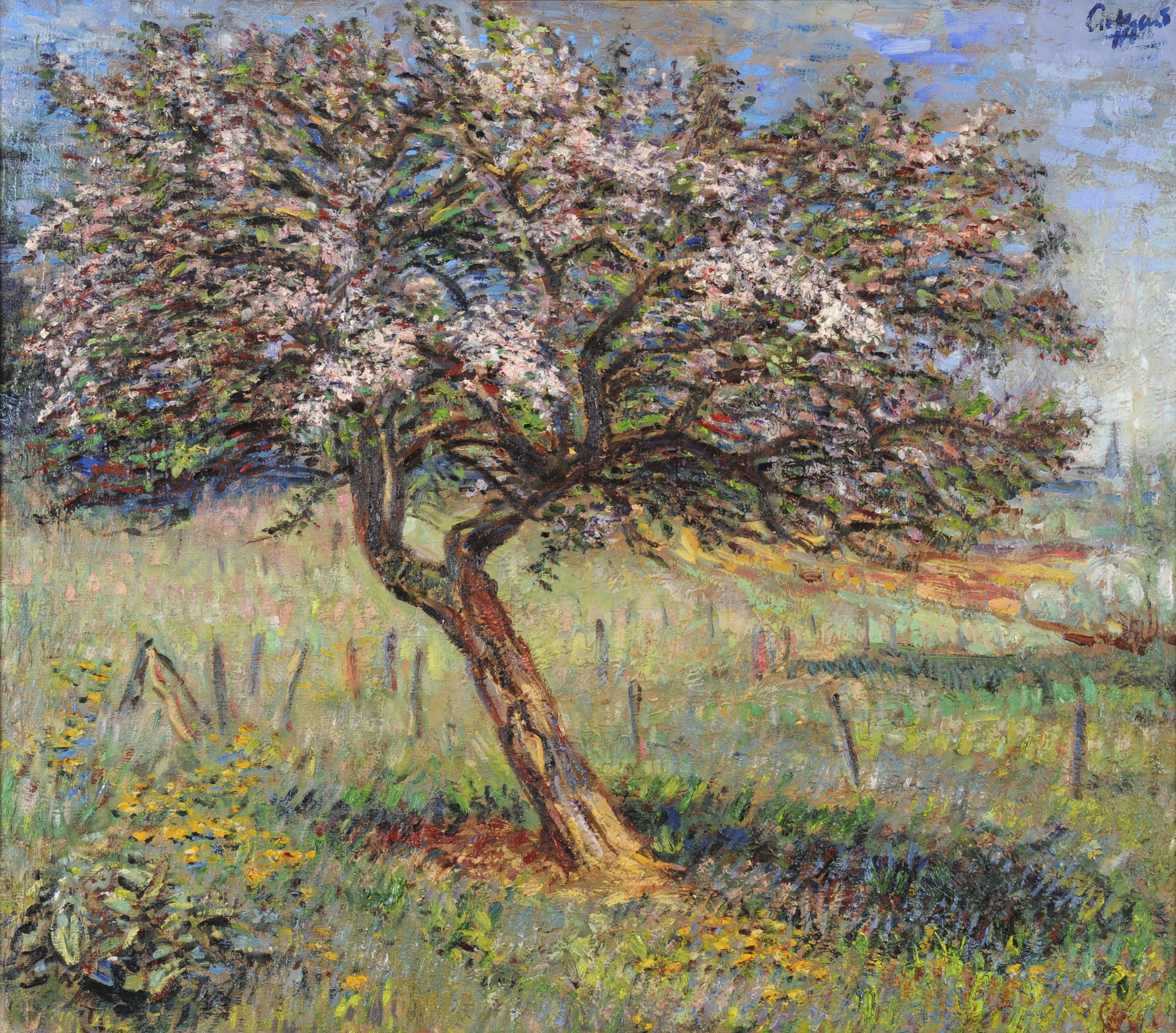
Cherry Blossom 2 (1984)

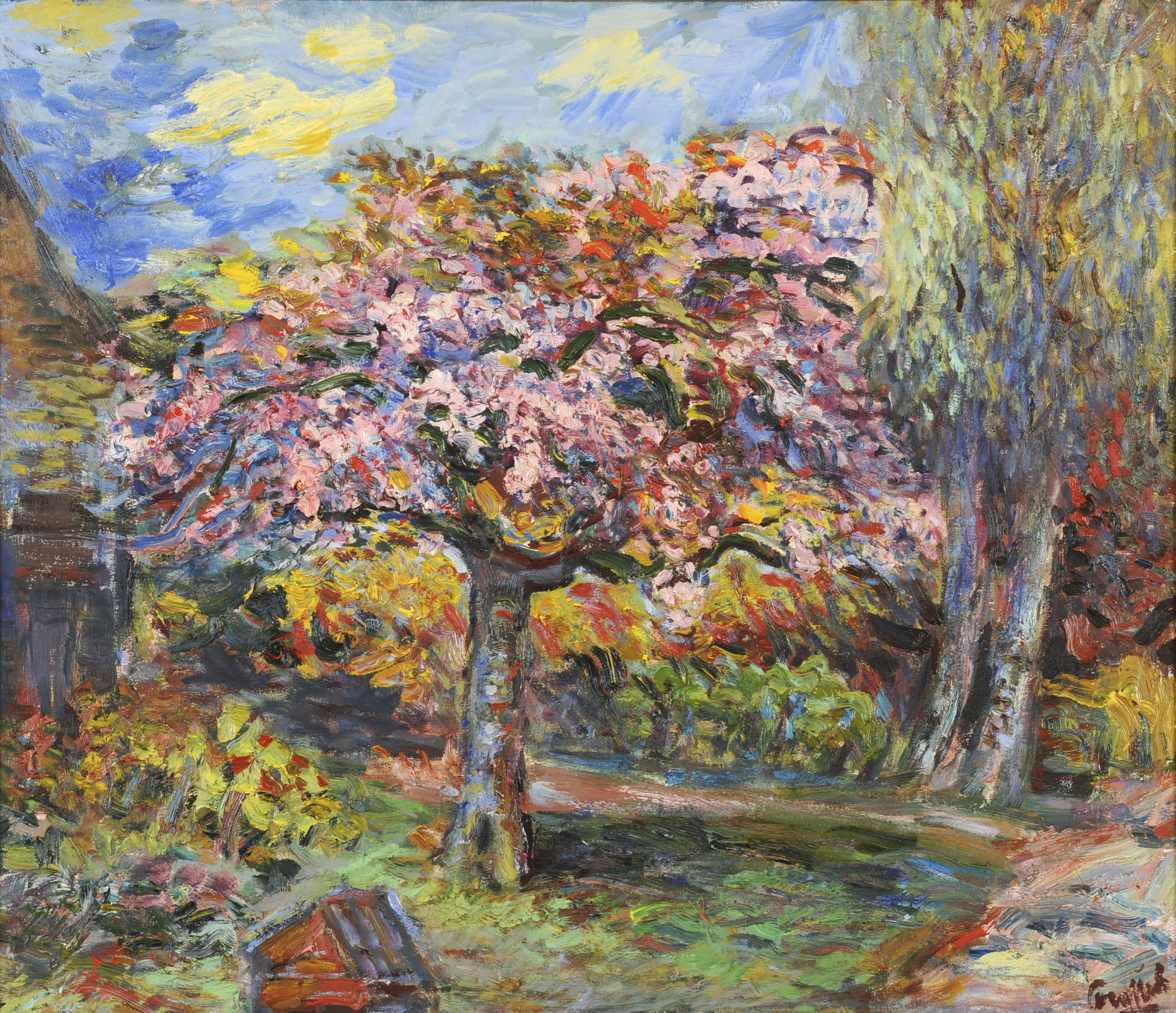
Apple Blossom (1984)

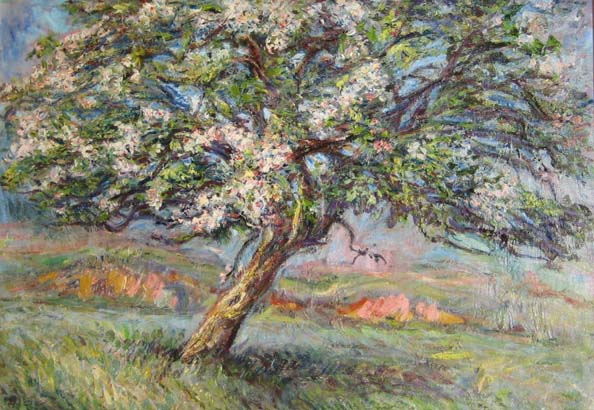
Cherry Blossom (1984)

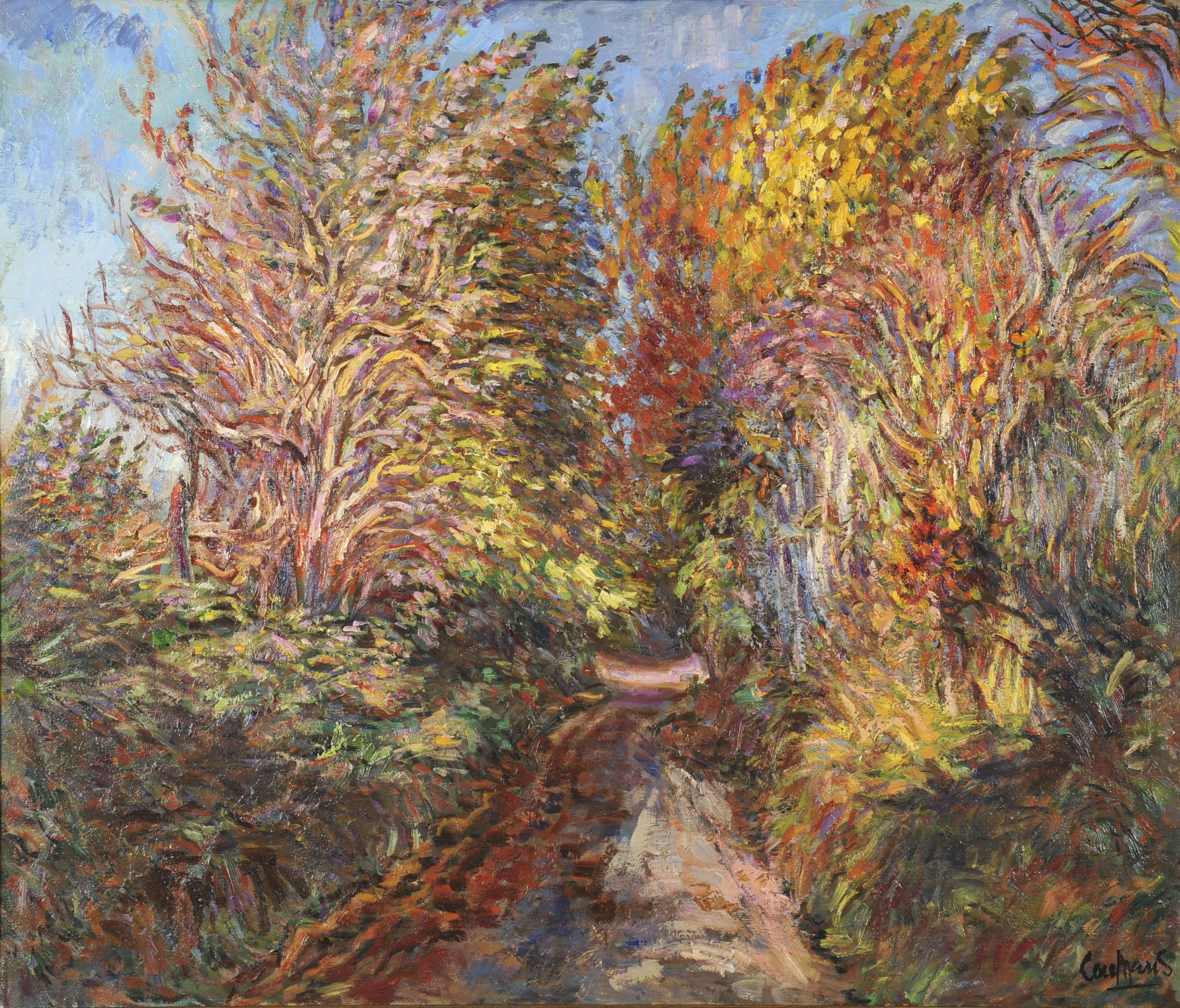
Holle weg Bingelrade (1986)

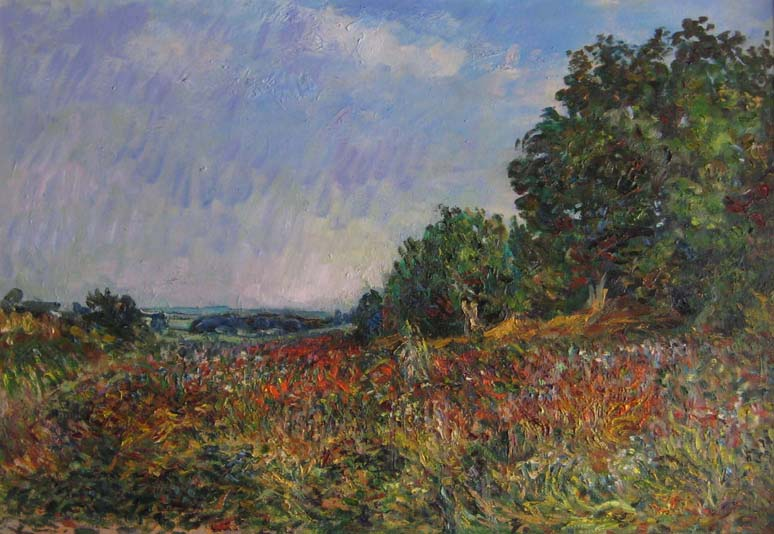
Field landscape Bingelrade (1986)

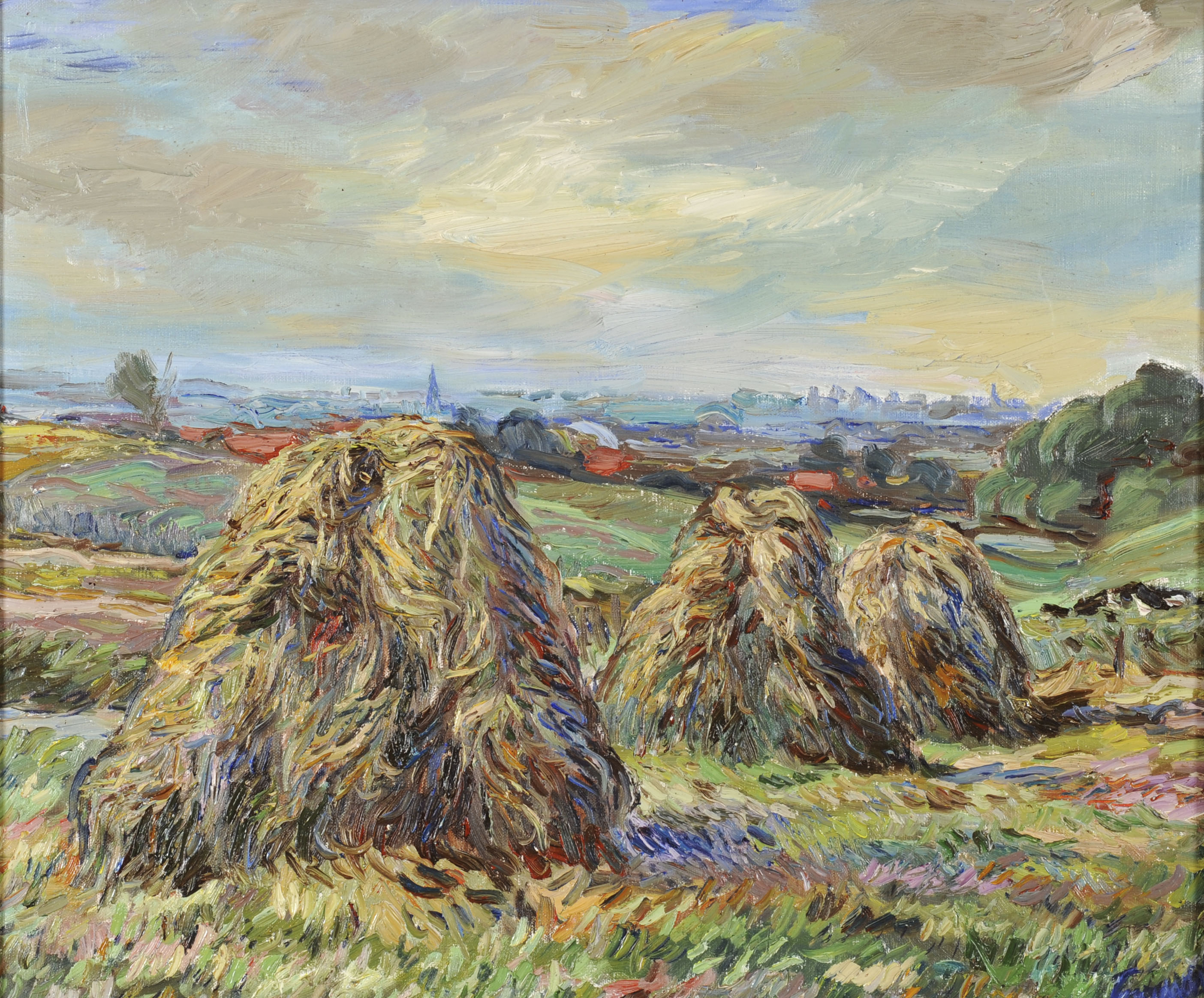
Hay bales Bingelrade (1986)

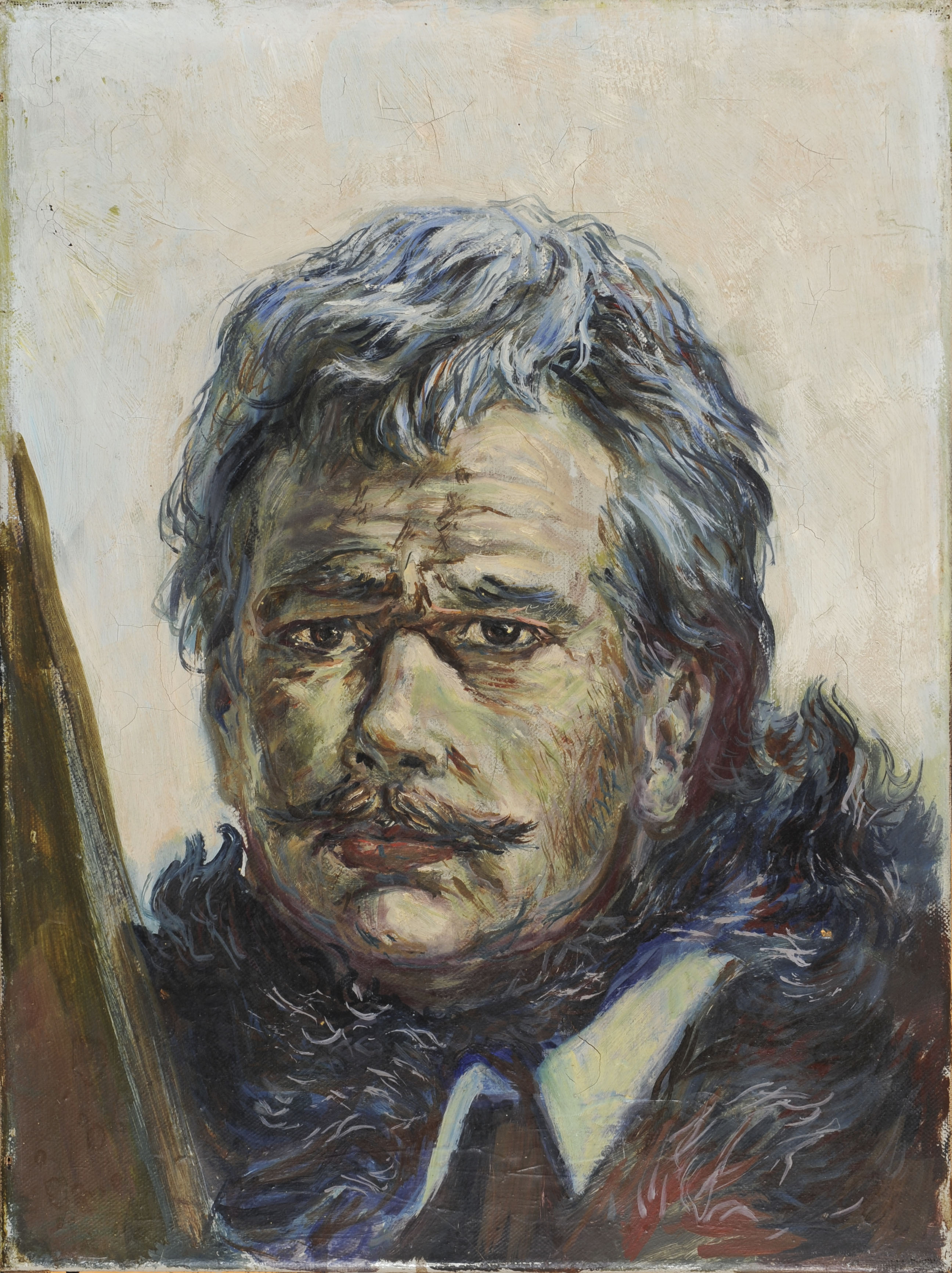
Self-portrait(1986)

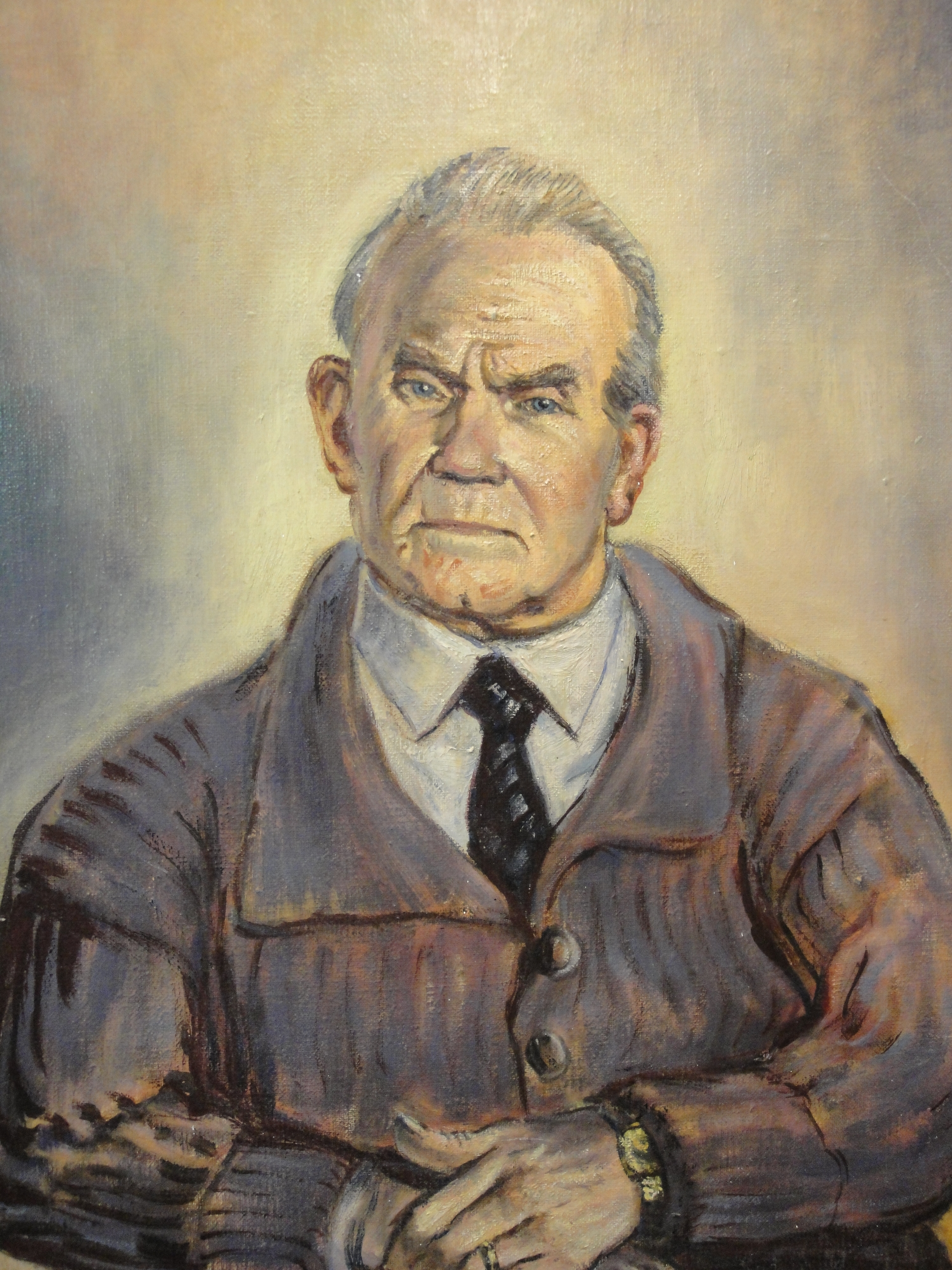
Portrait of a Man (1984)

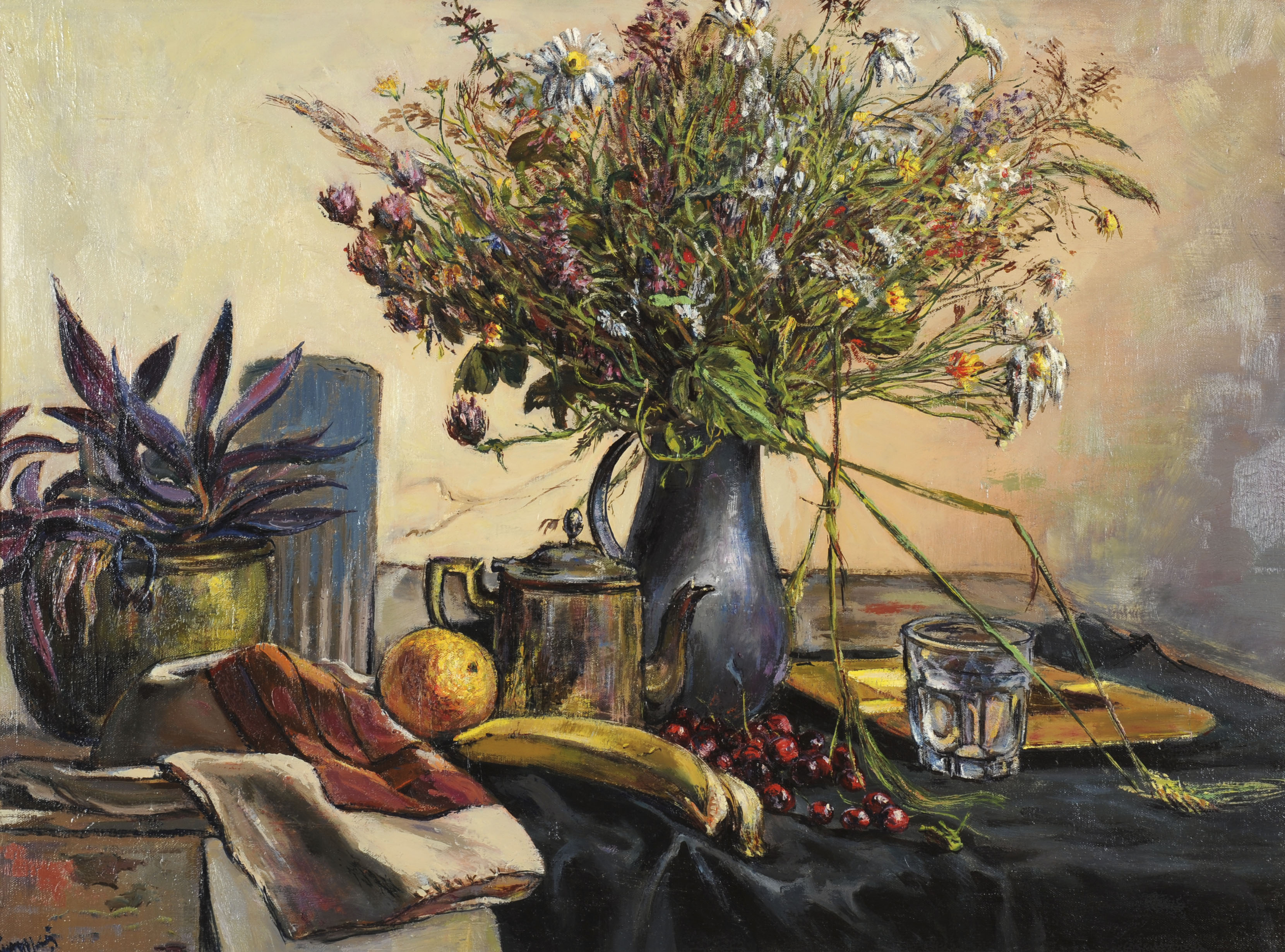
Still Life (1984)
