= Benzenrade =

- Hamlet
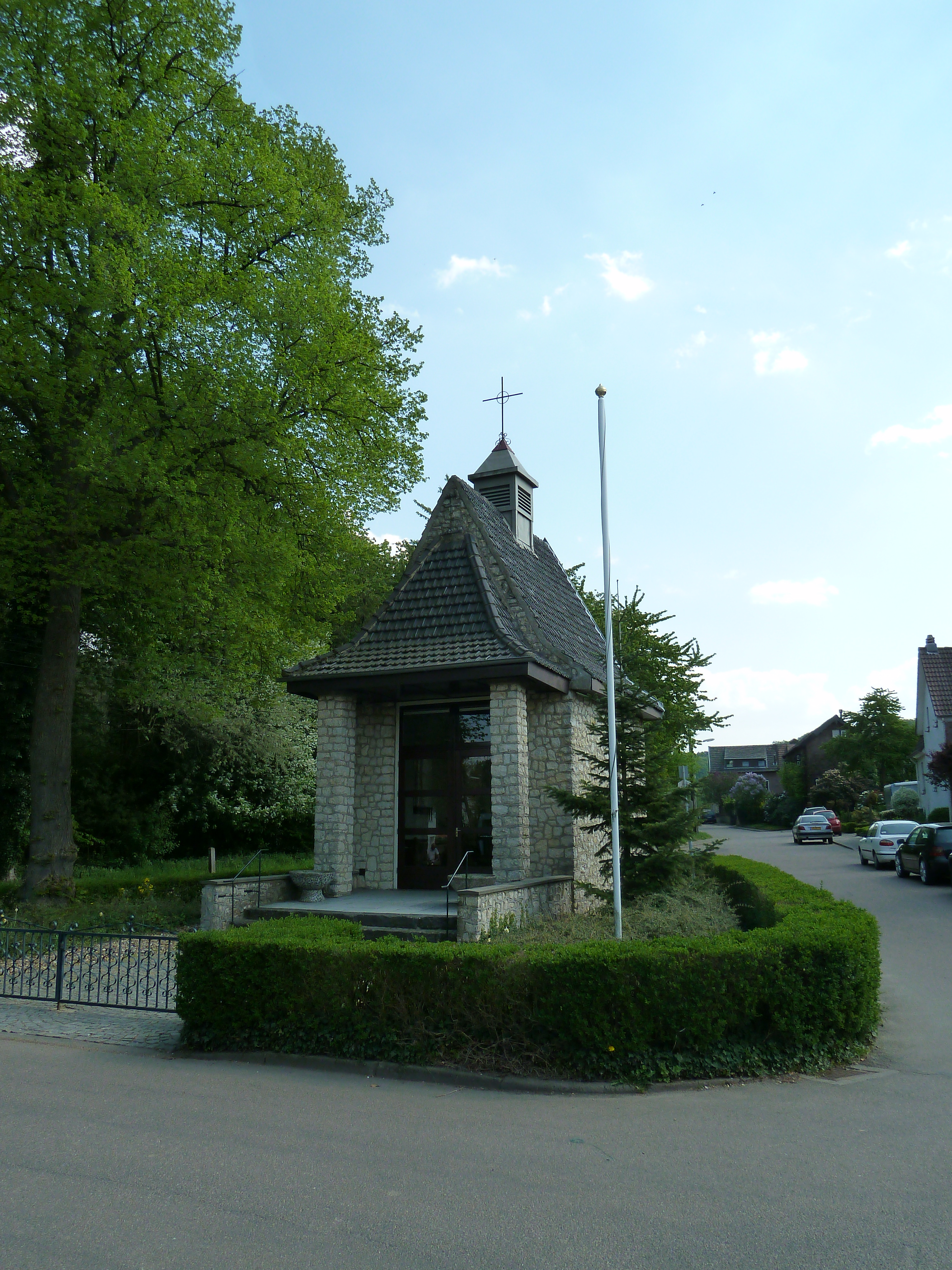
- Interactive map of Benzenrade
- Coordinates: 50°51′47″N 5°58′44″E
- Country: Netherlands
- Province: Limburg
- Municipality: Heerlen

Area
  - Total: 0.79 km^{2} (0.31 sq mi)

Population (2021)
  - Total: 190
  - Density: 240/km^{2} (620/sq mi)
- Time zone: UTC+1 (CET)
  - Summer (DST): UTC+2 (CEST)
- Postal code: 6419
- Dialing code: 045

Benzenrade is a Dutch hamlet located in the commune of Heerlen, in the province of Dutch Limburg.

Located on the border of the municipality and the city, it is between Ubachsberg (municipality of Voerendaal) and Imstenrade. On its north side, it abuts the neighbourhood of Welten. On the east, separated by the N281, is the neighbourhood of Heerlerbaan.

== Urbanism ==
Benzenrade is a linear village. While it is not part of the town centre of Heerlen, it is still considered part of the agglomeration. The area around Benzenrade, including Saint Joseph Hospital, was built up in the 1960s. Even though it is the site of a major regional hospital, Benzenrade retains its original village character. A spring at a nearby farm is the source of the Geleenbeek, which joins the Meuse River at Stevensweert after passing through Nuth, Schinnen, Sittard and Susteren.
