= Weltermolen, Welten =

Watermill in Heerlen, Netherlands

Coordinates: 50.876167°N 5.970894°E

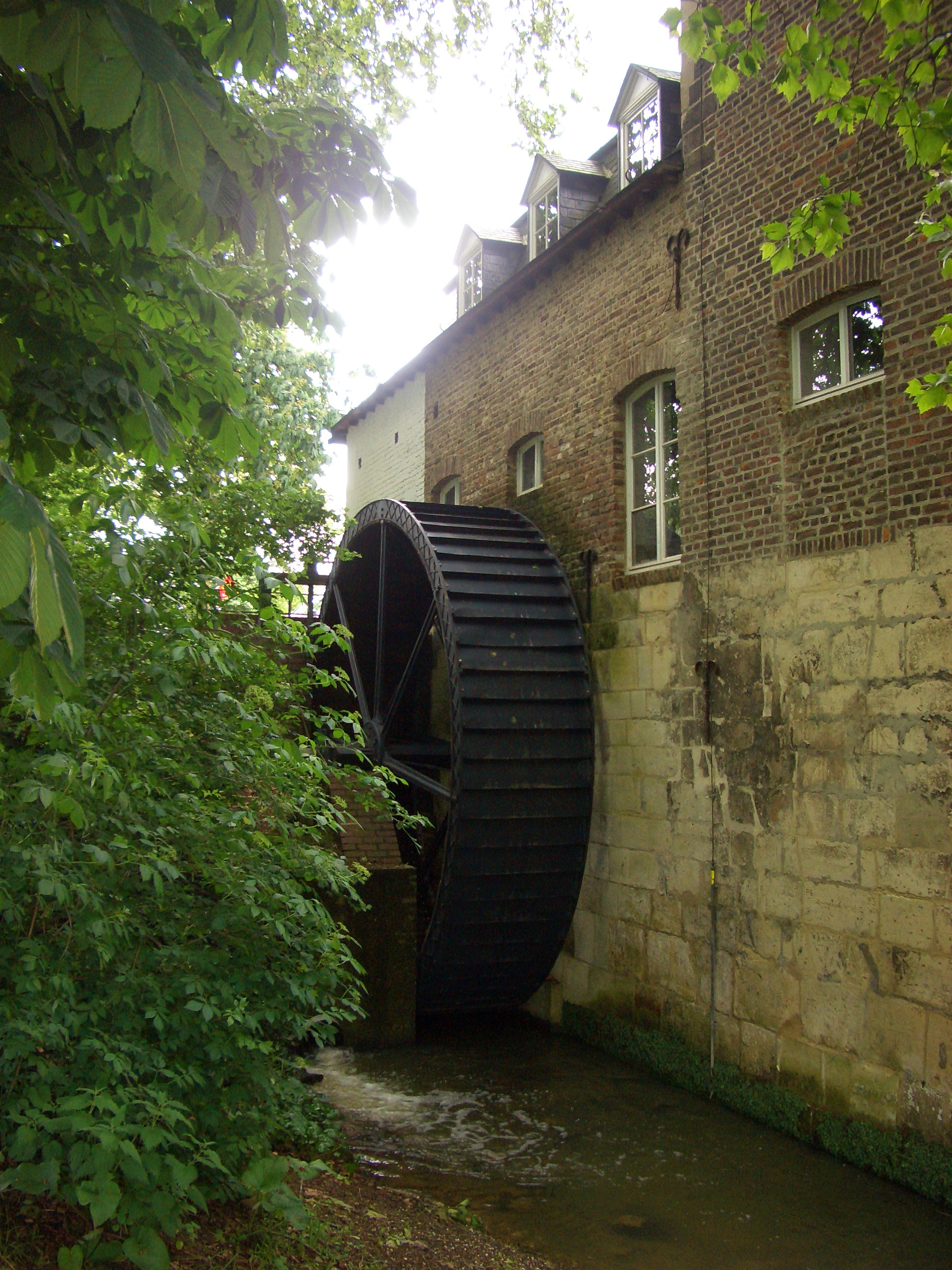
Picture of the waterwheel of the Weltermolen

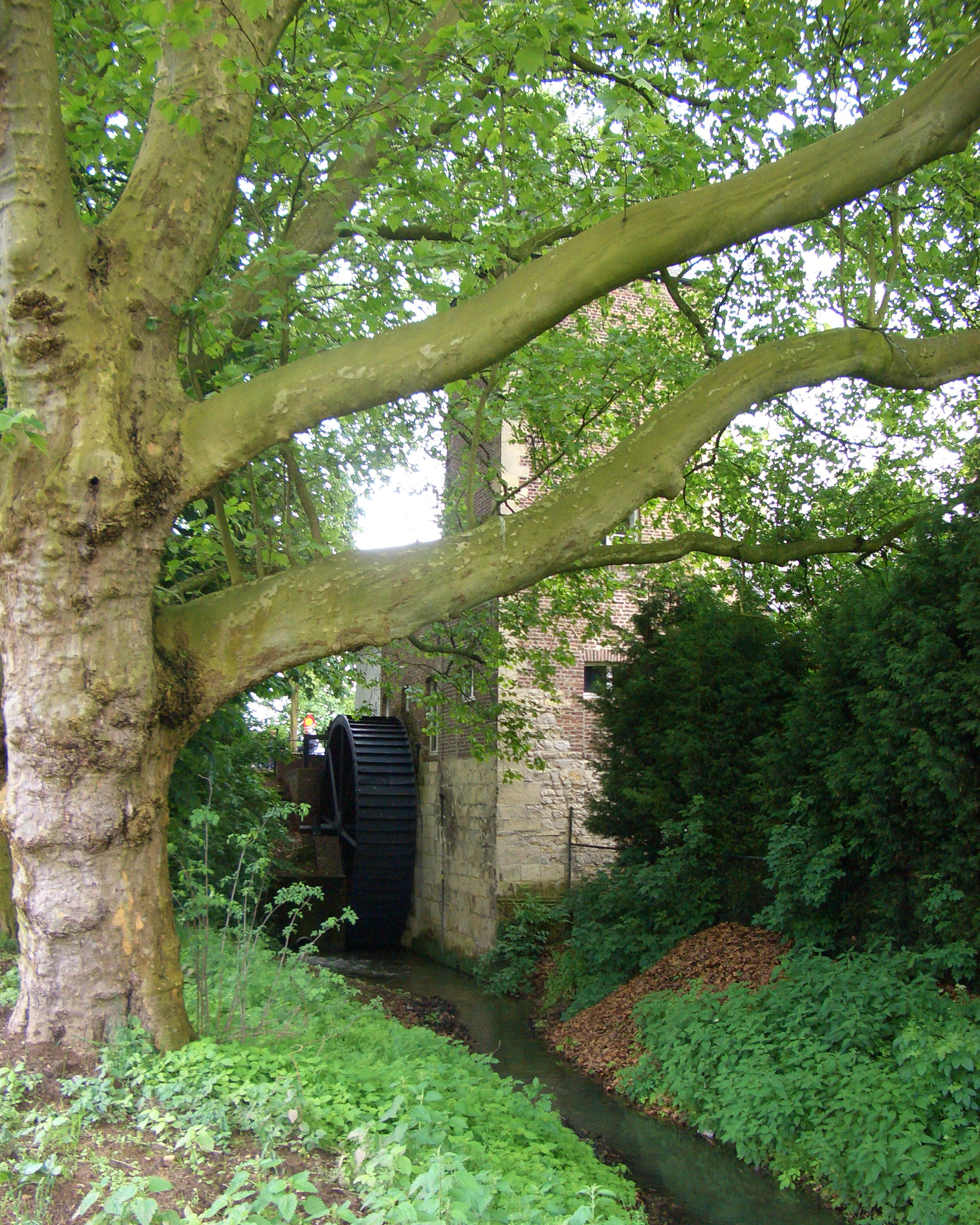
Picture of the Weltermolen over the Geleenbeek

The Weltermolen (literally "mill from Welten") is a watermill located in Welten, Heerlen in the Netherlands. It is fed by the Geleenbeek, with some extra force created by a largely man-made pond (the Weltervijver).

The Weltermolen wasn't a watermill until the start of the 20th century.

During World War II (approximately 1943) the waterwheel was taken out of action and an electrical motor took over.

The mill was already mentioned in the 14th century and it has a strong connection with Huis Strijthagen (or Huis Strijthagen tot Welten).

The present day mill consists of a long shaped part of one floor under a Mansard roof, a tower and the mill. The tower has a weather vane shaped like a carp.

The mill was restored in 1982 and is open to the public on milling days.

This watermill is one of several located in the Geleenbeek stream.
