= Theo Rutten =

Dutch politician (1899–1980)

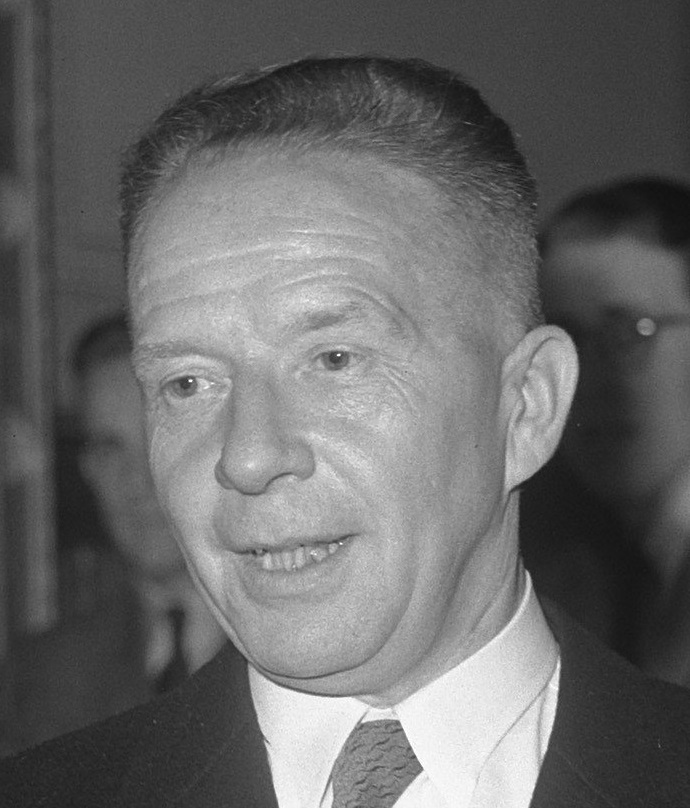
- Rutten in 1950

Minister of Education, Arts and Sciences
- In office 7 August 1948 – 2 September 1952
- Prime Minister: Willem Drees
- Preceded by: Jos Gielen
- Succeeded by: Jo Cals

Personal details
- Born: Frans Jozef Theo Rutten; 15 September 1899 Schinnen, Netherlands
- Died: 21 April 1980 (aged 80) Lopik, Netherlands
- Party: Catholic People's Party (from 1945)
- Other political affiliations: Roman Catholic State Party (until 1945)
- Spouse: Hilda Cornelia Elisabeth Leen (m. 1927)
- Children: 4 daughters and 1 son
- Education: Utrecht University (Bachelor of Letters, Bachelor of Social Science, Master of Letters, Master of Social Science, Doctor of Philosophy)
- Occupation: Politician; Psychologist; Researcher; Academic administrator; Author; Professor

Frans Jozef Theo Rutten (15 September 1899 – 21 April 1980) was a Dutch politician and minister for the Catholic People's Party.

Rutten was from 1931 professor of psychology at the Katholieke Universiteit Nijmegen, succeeding his mentor nl:Francis Roels. In 1948 he succeeded Jos Gielen as Minister of Education in the First Drees cabinet. He unfolded his first "Onderwijsnota" (teaching note) plans for an integrated approach to secondary education, which Jo Cals would later expand upon. Rutten had 1952 legislation introduced for the training of teachers. After his period as minister, he returned to the sciences.

He was the father of the late-twentieth-century Dutch top economics civil servant Frans Rutten.

As Minister of Education, Rutten became infamous in the world of Dutch comics for the letter he had published on 25 October 1948 in the newspaper Het Parool and directly addressed to all educational institutions and local government bodies, advocating the prohibition of comics. In the letter, he had stated, "These booklets, which contain a series of illustrations with accompanying text, are generally sensational in character, without any other value. It is not possible to proceed in a legal manner against printers, publishers or distributors of these novels, nor can anything be achieved by not making paper available to them, since this for those publications necessary paper, is available on the free market," further implying that it became the civil duty of parents, teachers and civil servants, including policemen, to confiscate and destroy comic books wherever they found them. Less than a month later, a 16-year-old girl was murdered in a bizarre manner on 19 November in the small town of Enkhuizen by her 15-year old boyfriend, who had tied her down to a railway track where she was killed by a passing train. The police subsequently uncovered that both had been readers of comic books of the kind that were in concordance with Rutten's definition. Taken as validation, a witch-hunt ensued, complete with comic book destructions all over the country, nearly destroying the comic phenomenon in the Netherlands, which had only just begun recovering from the war years. In an atmosphere of near-hysteria, all comic publications were suspended forthwith by societal, self-censorship. Considered "healthy", the comic productions of the Toonder Studio's, which included the as literature considered Tom Poes, were the only ones for which an exemption was made. In this respect, Rutten has been to Dutch comics, what Fredric Wertham would six years later become to the American comic world. With Wertham, Rutten had a background in psychology in common.

== Publications ==
- Franciscus Josephus Theodorus Rutten et al. (Ed.) (1955): Menselijke Verhoudening. Bussum: Paul Brand.

Political offices
Preceded by Jos Gielen	Minister of Education, Arts and Sciences; 1948–1952	Succeeded by Jo Cals
