= Amstenrade =

- Village
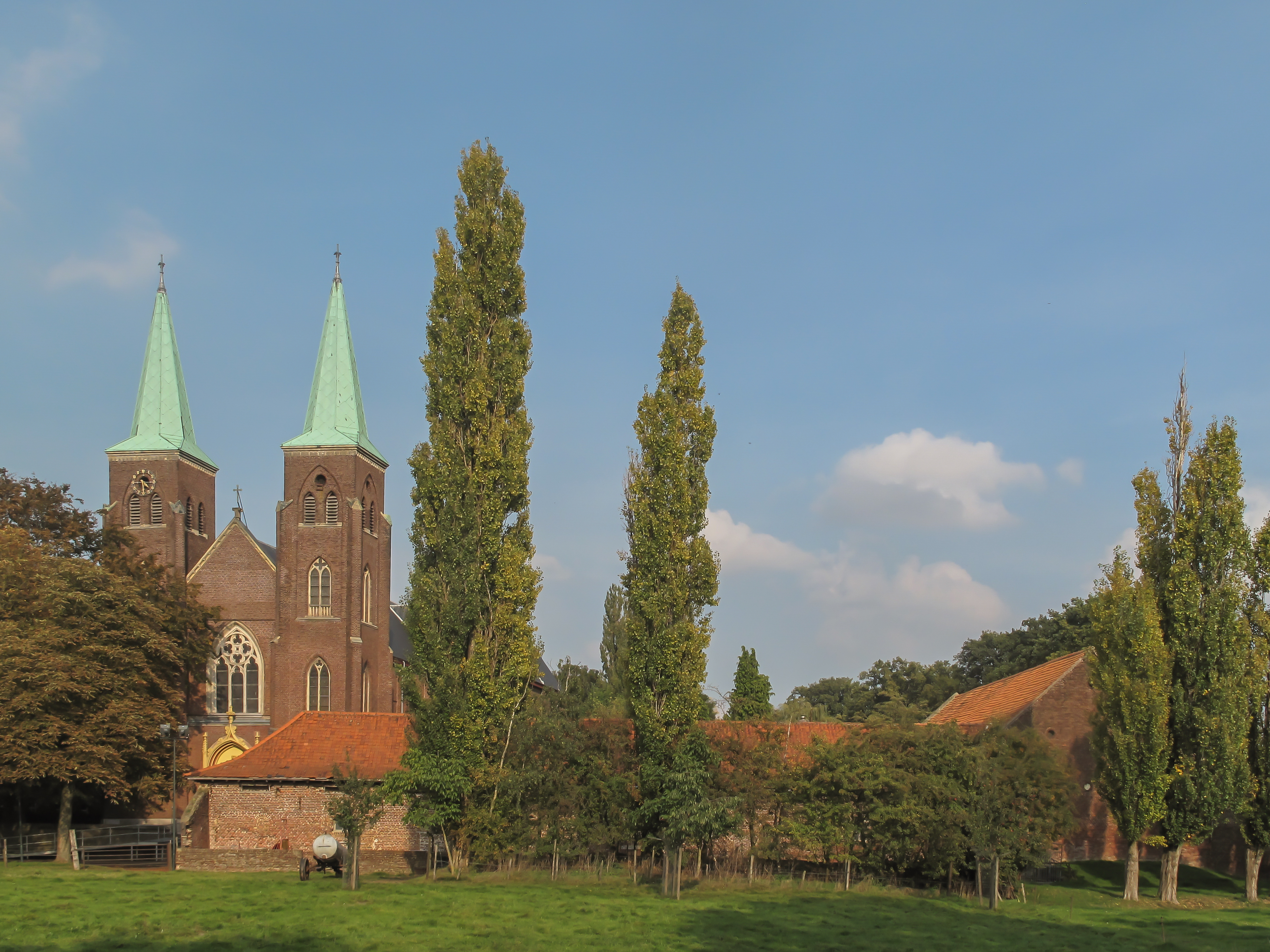
- Amstenrade church

- Flag Coat of arms

- Location in the Netherlands Location in the province of Limburg in the Netherlands
- Coordinates: 50°56′25″N 5°55′20″E
- Country: Netherlands
- Province: Limburg
- Municipality: Beekdaelen

Area
  - Total: 1.25 km^{2} (0.48 sq mi)
- Elevation: 91 m (299 ft)

Population (2021)
  - Total: 1,675
  - Density: 1,340/km^{2} (3,470/sq mi)
- Time zone: UTC+1 (CET)
  - Summer (DST): UTC+2 (CEST)
- Postal code: 6436
- Dialing code: 046

Amstenrade is a village in the municipality of Beekdaelen, in the Netherlands. It is located about 7 km northwest of Heerlen. The Amstenrade Castle is located in the village.

== History ==
The village was first mentioned in 1274 as Anstenroden, and means "cultivation of the forest of Ansto (person)". Amstenrade developed in the Middle Ages on a plateau. The area was cultivated in the 13th century from the Geleenbeek onwards. It was originally a heerlijkheid. In 1654, it was elevated to county. The village concentrated around Amstenrade Castle and the road from Sittard to Heerlen.

The Catholic Our Lady of Immaculate Conception Church is a three-aisled church with two tower which was built between 1852 and 1856. In 1932, it was enlarged according to a design by Pierre Cuypers and his son Joseph Cuypers.

Amstenrade was home to 502 people in 1840. Between 1839 and 1982, Amstenrade was a separate municipality. It became part of the municipality of Beekdaelen in 2019.

== Amstenrade Castle ==
The original Amstenrade Castle dated from the late-13th century. The tower is the oldest extant part and dates from 1609. In 1780, most of the castle was demolished, and a new castle built in neoclassic style, however the right wing and north-eastern tower remained unchanged. In 1810, the De Marchant d'Ansembourg family moved into the castle. The castle is still in use as a residential house.

== Gallery ==
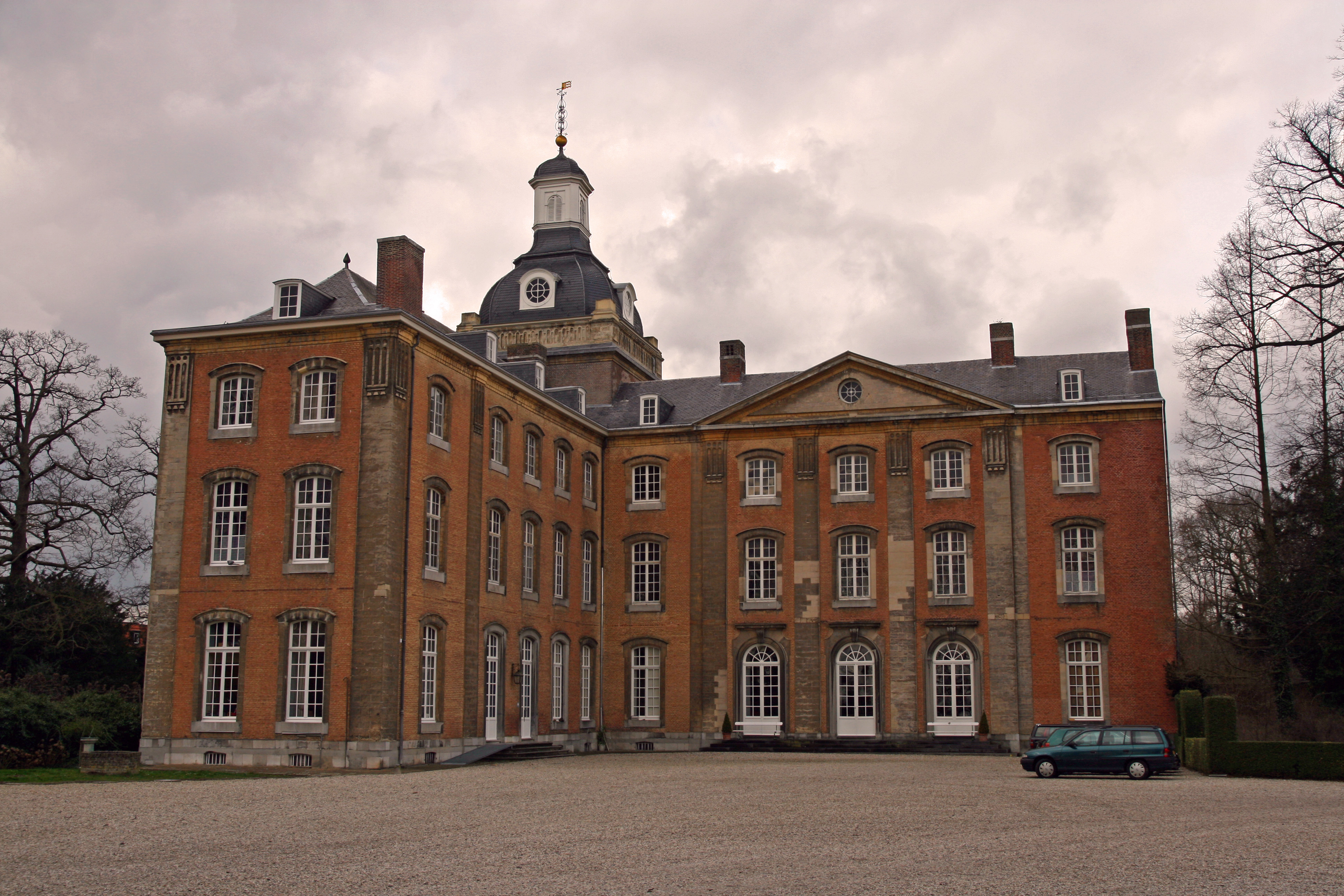
Amstenrade Castle

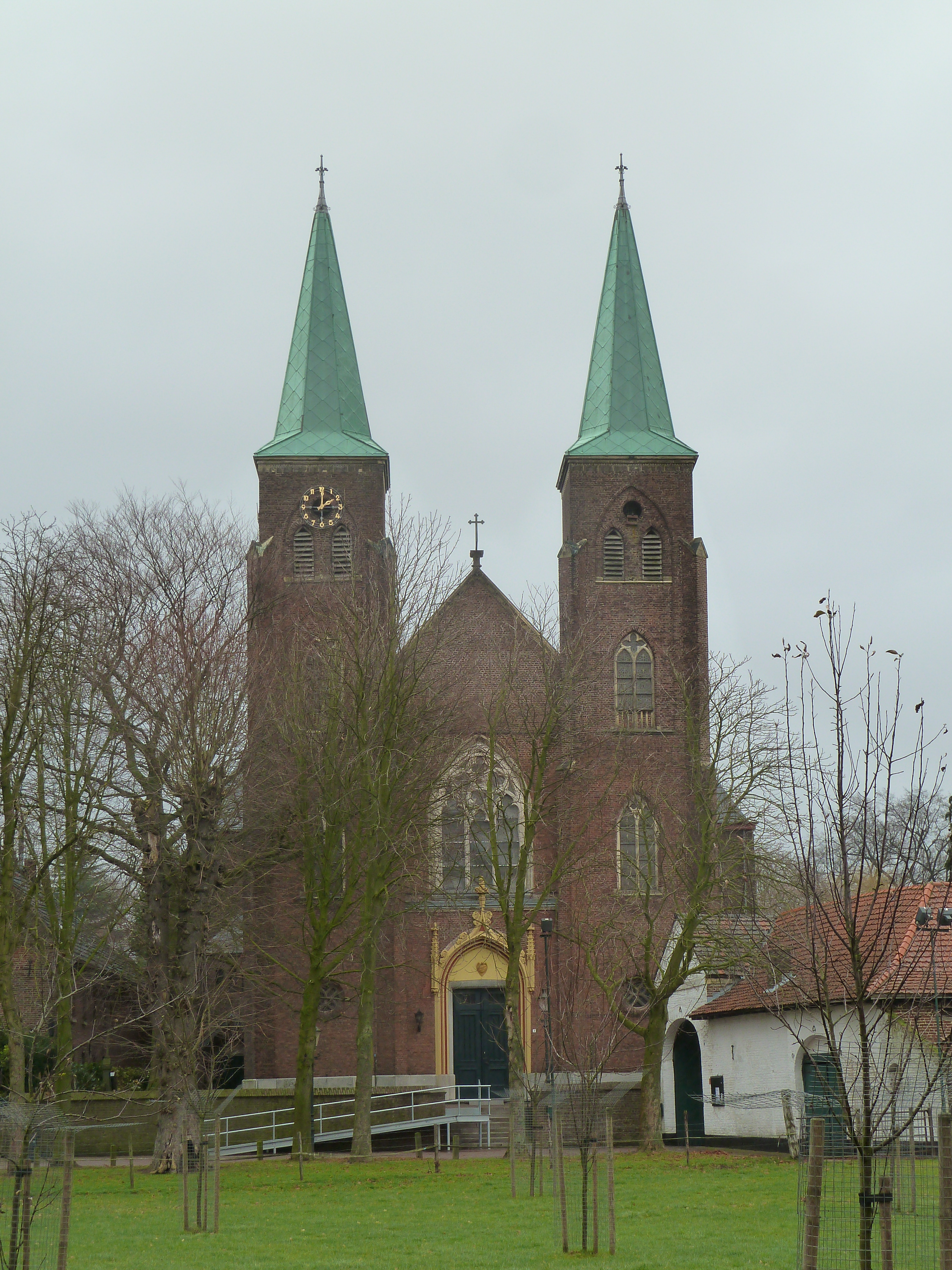
Catholic church

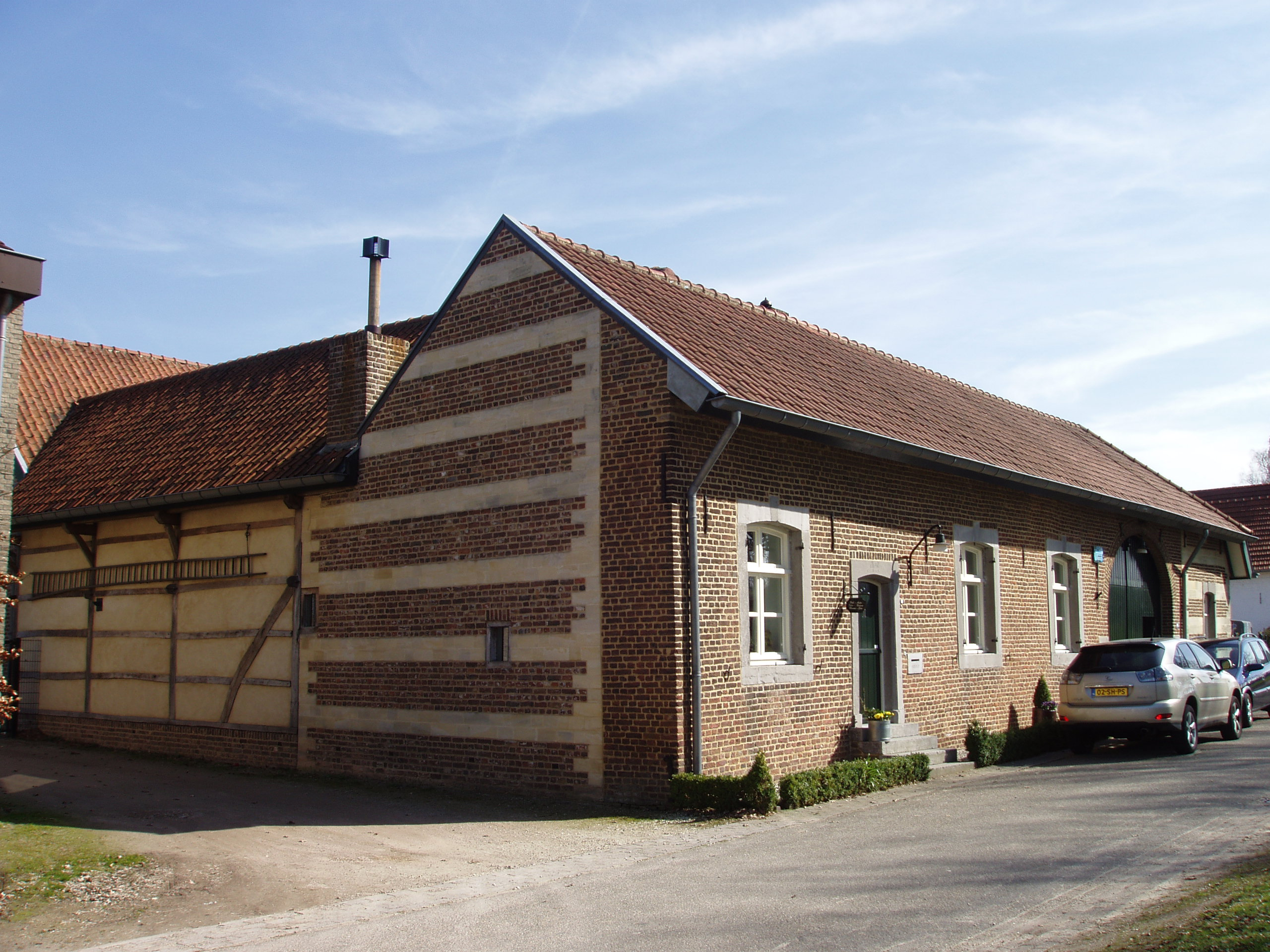
House in Amstenrade

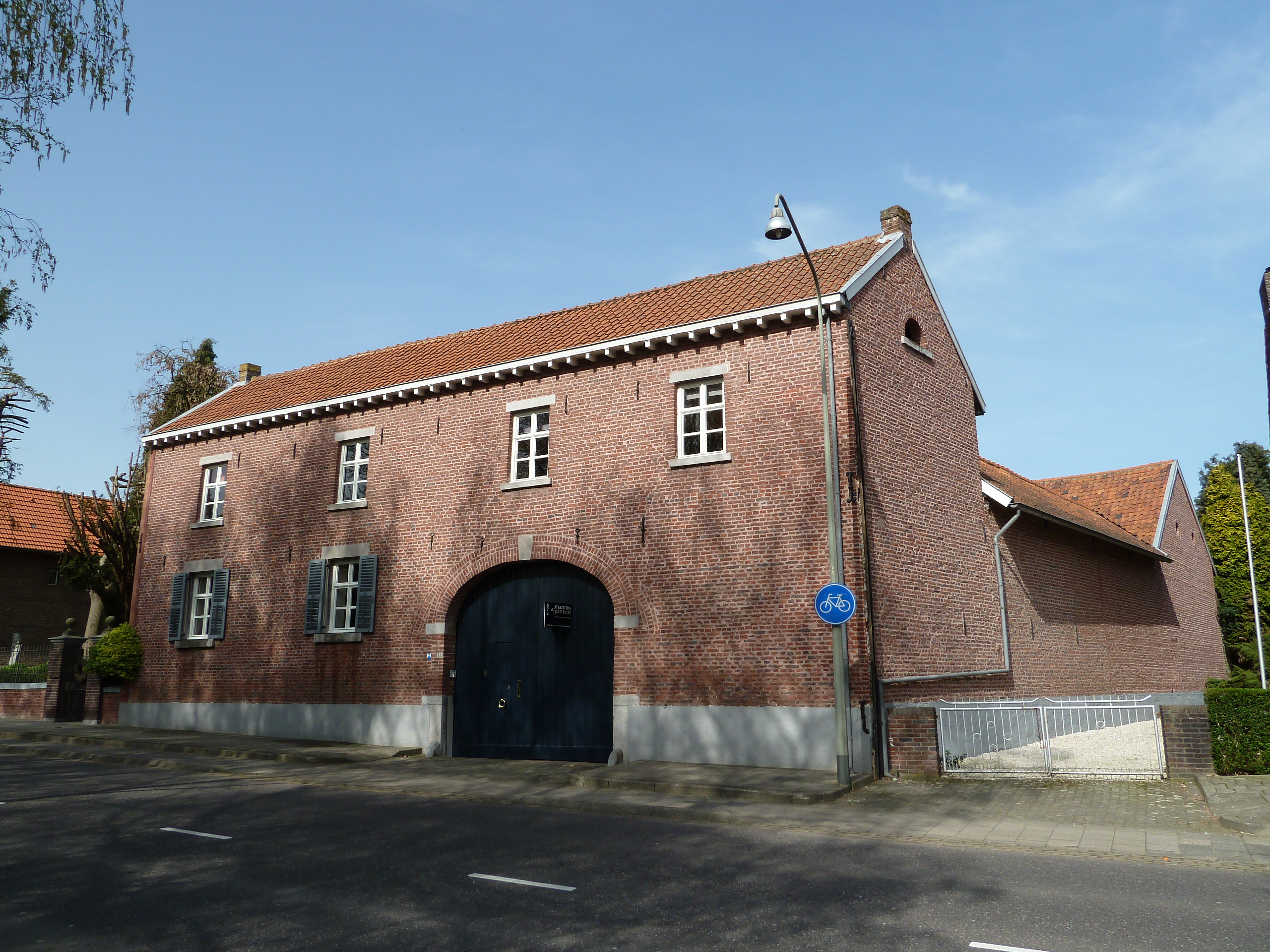
Farm in Amstenrade
