= Alfa Brewery =

Dutch brewery

Alfa Brouwerij
- Location: Schinnen, Limburg the Netherlands
- Coordinates: 50°56.155855′N 5°53.643465′E
- Opened: 1870
- Annual production volume: 120,000 hectolitres (100,000 US bbl)
- Owned by: Henry Meens
- Website: www.alfa-bier.nl

Active beers
Name	Type
Oude Bruin
Edelpils	Pilsner
Lentebok	Bock
Super Dortmunder
Bokbier	Bock

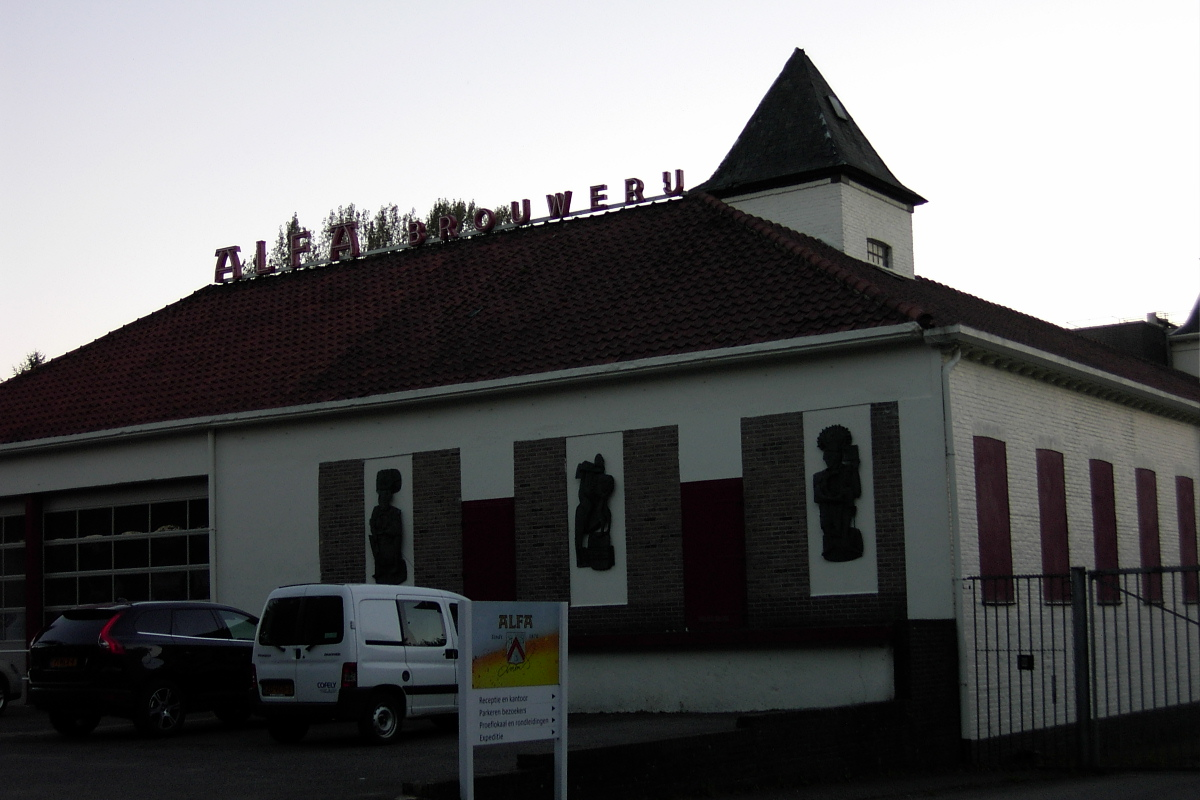
Alfa in Thull

Alfa Brewery (Alfa Brouwerij) is a family-owned independent brewery located in Schinnen, the Netherlands. Alfa was started in 1870 by Joseph Meens and is one of the few independent breweries left in the Province of Limburg.

== Availability ==
Until 1960 Alfa beers were only available in the local area, but since then the brewery has expanded, and their beers are now available throughout the Netherlands. Since 1993 Alfa also expanded their distribution to Germany, the United Kingdom, the United States, Greece, Italy and Hong Kong . Alfa has also produced brews for other companies, such as the unfiltered pilsner Puur produced for Bier Fabriek.

== Brief details ==
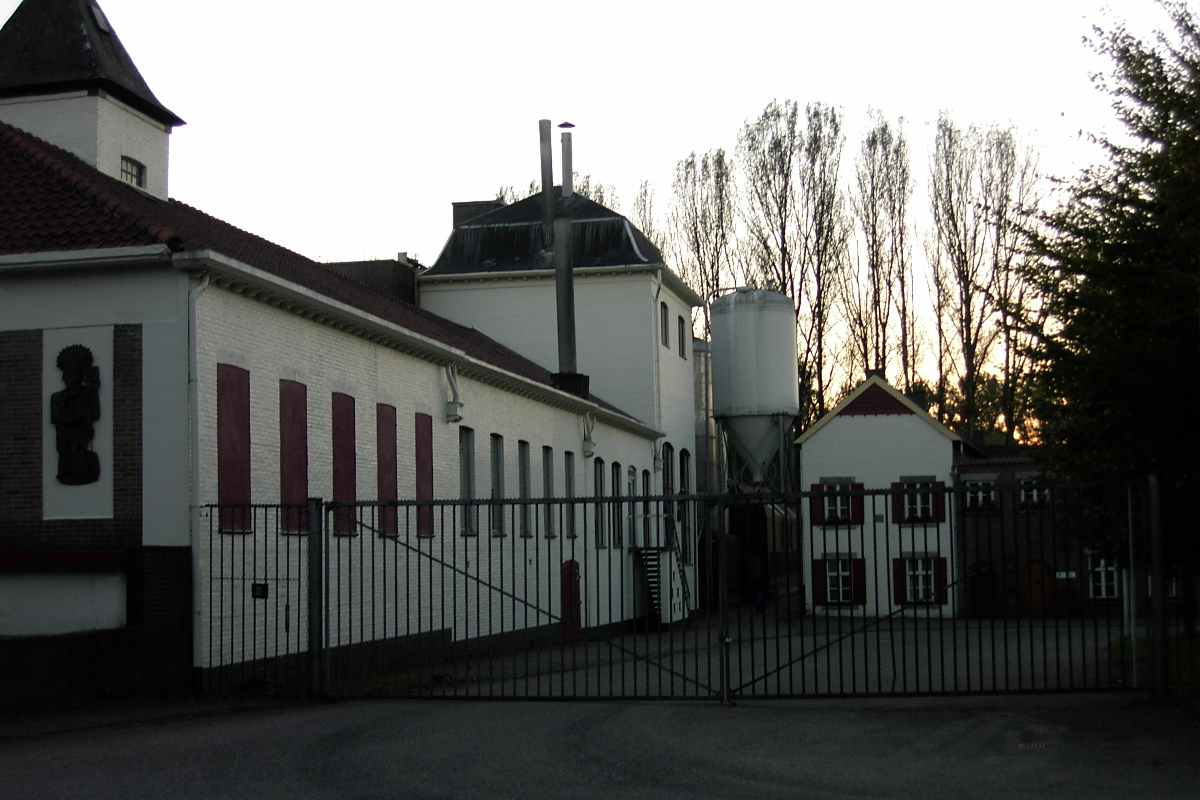
Alfa

The brewery follows the Reinheitsgebot and is the only brewery in the Netherlands that uses an officially certified underground spring. The Dutch Ministry of Health, Welfare, and Sport certified the underground spring in 1995 and retests it every six months to ensure it continues to meet the stringent standards. It is one of only 10 such springs in the country and the only one used in the production of beer. The water is so pure that it does not require any processing before it is entered into the brewing process. Only a certain amount of water is permitted to be withdrawn each year, and this has led Alfa to number their beer bottles to ensure that only the authorised amount is used.

== Awards ==
- Royal Warrant by Royal Decree from HM Queen Beatrix (1995).
- Gold medal in the 31st and 33rd Monde Selections in Brussels
- Award in the 1999 UK Beer and Cider Competition
