= Frans Körver =

Dutch footballer and manager (1937–2024)

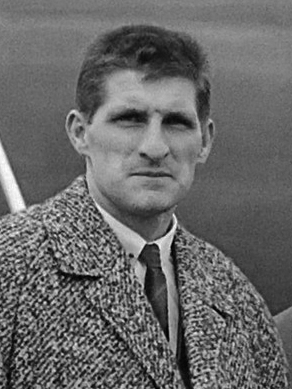
- Körver in 1965

Personal information
- Full name: Franciscus Arnoldus Mattheus Körver
- Date of birth: 31 July 1937
- Place of birth: Schinnen, Netherlands
- Date of death: 14 December 2024 (aged 87)
- Position: Goalkeeper

Youth career
- –1956: SV Schinnen

Senior career*
Years	Team	Apps	(Gls)
1956–1957	SV Schinnen		
1957–1961	Sittardia	52	(0)
1961–1974	MVV	396	(0)
Total		448	(0)

Managerial career
- 1974–1977: Tongeren
- 1977–1980: FC Wageningen
- 1980–1984: Fortuna Sittard
- 1984: DS'79
- 1984–1986: Roda JC
- 1986–1989: MVV
- 1989–1992: Helmond Sport
- 1992–1994: FC VVV
- 1994–1995: De Graafschap
- 1995–1998: MVV
- 1999–2002: Wlhelmina '08
- 2006–2007: Fortuna Sittard
- * Club domestic league appearances and goals

Franciscus Arnoldus Mattheus Körver (31 July 1937 – 14 December 2024) was a Dutch professional football player and manager.

== Career ==
Körver made his debut for Sittardia in 1959 and played over 50 matches for the club before joining Limburg rivals MVV. He played 396 games in 13 years for the Maastricht side, before becoming assistant manager at the club.

During the 1980s and 1990s, Körver guided five Dutch league teams to six promotions from the Eerste Divisie to the Eredivisie – FC Wageningen, Fortuna Sittard, MVV Maastricht (twice), VVV-Venlo and De Graafschap. He also worked at Roda JC and is the only one who managed all four of Limburg's professional football clubs.

== Personal life and death ==
Körver was born in Schinnen. He died on 14 December 2024, at the age of 87.

== Honours ==
MVV

- UEFA Intertoto Cup: 1970 (Group A4)
