= Hans Erkens =

Dutch footballer (born 1952)

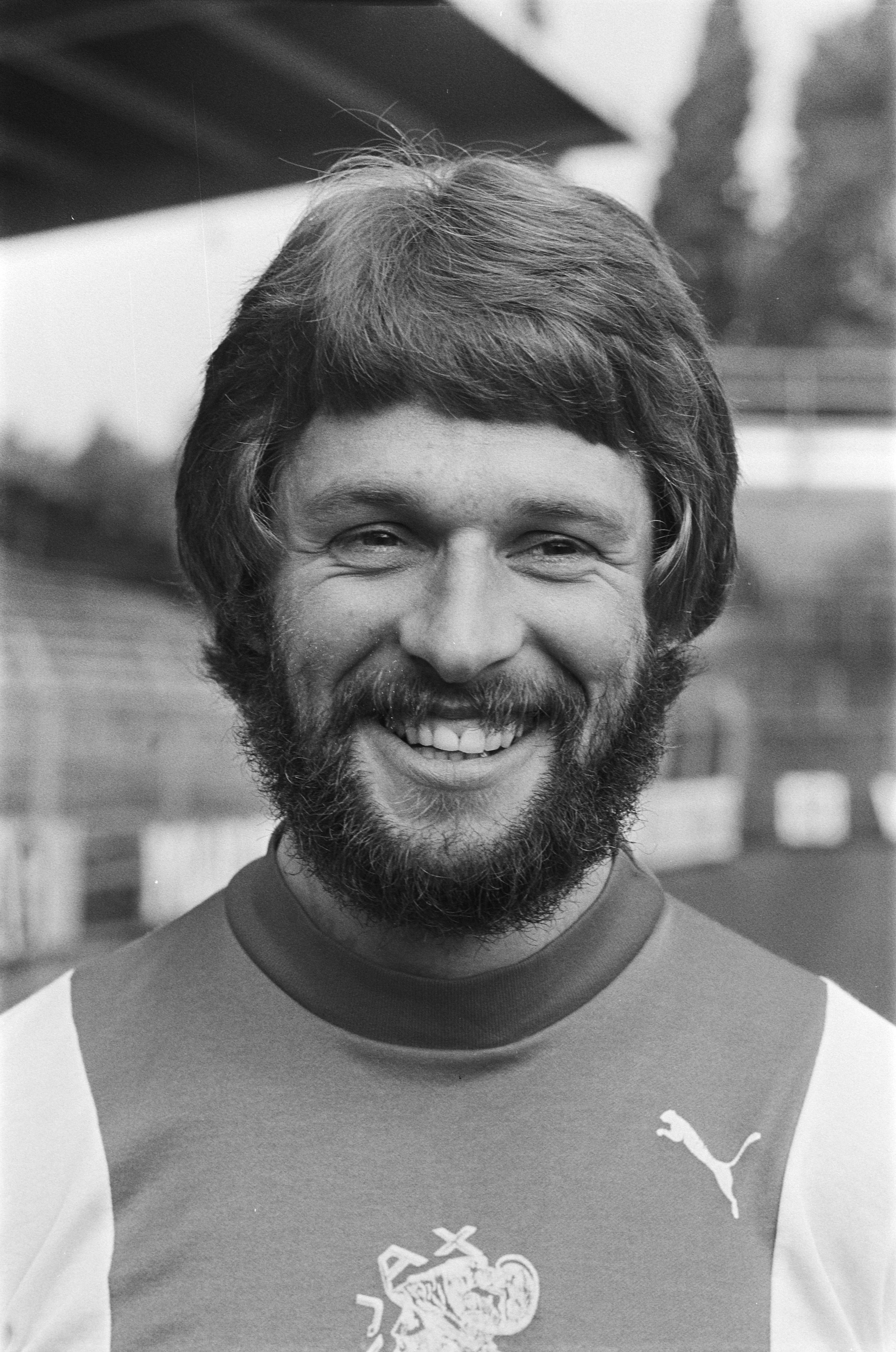
- Erkens in 1978

Personal information
- Date of birth: 14 July 1952 (age 74)
- Place of birth: Schinnen, Netherlands
- Positions: Midfielder; forward

Youth career
- SV Schinnen

Senior career*
Years	Team	Apps	(Gls)
1971–1976	Fortuna	171	(34)
1976–1979	Ajax	80	(7)
1979–1980	RWDM	13	(3)
1980–1981	MVV	2	(0)
Total		266	(44)
- * Club domestic league appearances and goals

Hans Erkens (born 14 July 1952) is a Dutch retired footballer who played for Ajax (July 1976–June 1979) among others.

== Playing career ==
Erkens was born in Schinnen, Limburg, Netherlands and started his career at Fortuna. He moved to Ajax in 1976 and won two league titles and one KNVB Cup with the Amsterdam giants.

He later played for Belgian side RWDM and MVV.

== Post-playing career ==
After his retirement he became a sports director. He left his position as interim director of Fortuna in 2009, as he was disappointed the proposed merger with rivals Roda JC fell through. He also worked as commercial manager for MVV.

== Honours ==
Ajax

- Eredivisie: 1976–77, 1978–79
- KNVB Cup: 1978–79; runner-up: 1977–78
