= Imstenrade =

Coordinates: 50°51′05″N 5°59′05″E

Imstenrade Imsterao
- Village
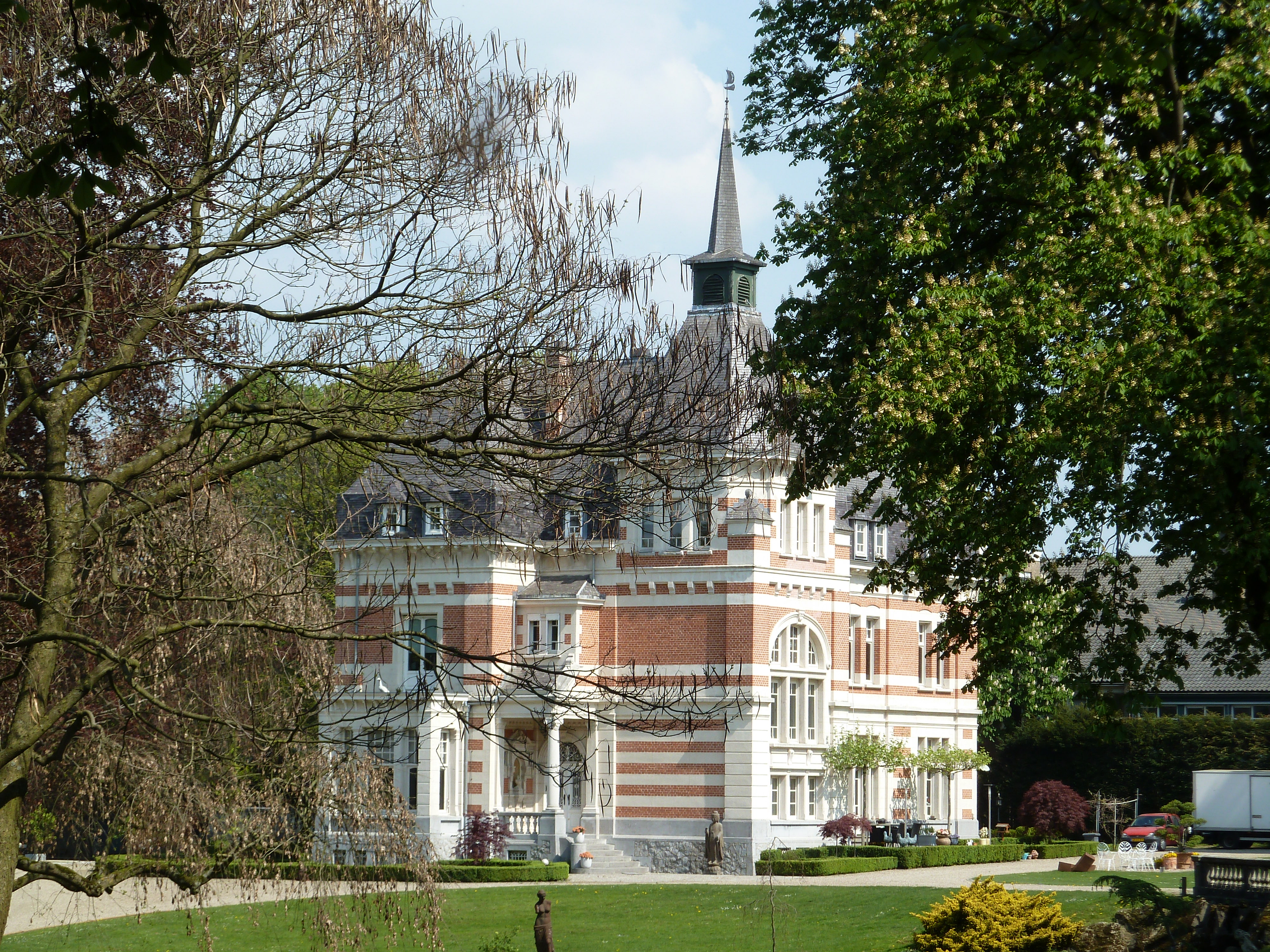
- Villa Imstenrade

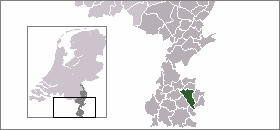
- Country: Netherlands
- Province: Limburg
- Municipality: Heerlen

Population (2014)
  - Total: 336
- Time zone: UTC+1 (CET)
  - Summer (DST): UTC+2 (CEST)

Imstenrade (Limburgish: Imsterao) is a hamlet in the southeastern Netherlands. It is part of the municipality of Heerlen in the province of Limburg, about 20 km east of Maastricht. The village lies between Benzenrade and Simpelveld, next to the A76 motorway and the N281 provincial road. In 2014 the village had a population of 336 and was home to an immigration detention centre with space for 700 immigrants.

== Etymology ==
Imstenrade shares its name with the family Emsenrade that used to own the local castle. "Em" means around, "sen" refers to a stone building, and "rode" is common part of village names in the Netherlands, often located close to forests. It refers to a region that was deforested for agriculture (Dutch: rooien).

== History ==
The remains of a Roman villa are located in the forest Imsteraderbos, officially in the neighbouring village of Benzenrade. In the 14th century there was a castle in Imstenrade owned by the family Emsenrode. The castle had a hunting forest and stood at least until the 17th century. By the 19th century the estate only encompassed two farms and surrounding lands. In 1908 villa Imstenrade was built near the southern farm and in 1928 a park was added around the villa. The villa eventually became a female monastery of the Medical Mission Sisters, who also built several other buildings in the region, and later became private property again.

== Culture ==
The village is home to villa Imstenrade which was built in 1908. Next to the villa is a monumental farmhouse with a water tower built in 1910.

The farm and villa are located on the southern edge of the Imsteraderbos, a 65 hectare forest owned by Vereniging Natuurmonumenten. Originally 28 hectare it served as hunting grounds for castle Imstenrade. It was sold by the municipality to Vereniging Natuurmonumenten in 2010. There are trees that date back to the 18th century and as such the forest has some of the tallest European beeches in the Netherlands. One beech is particularly large with a girth of 5.33 meters measured at 1.3 meters of the ground.

The villa eventually became a female monastery of the Medical Mission Sisters, who raised a new monastery building next to the villa. In 1994 this second building became an immigration detention centre with space for 700 immigrants. Next to the immigration detention centre is a municipal cemetery.

The first provincial midwifery school was built on the north side of the forest in 1913. The building was quickly too small and in 1923 queen Wilhelmina opened the new and current building. In 1934 the Saint Elisabeth Chapel was built next to the midwifery school. In 1993 the school moved to a new location in Kerkrade and the building became a home for the elderly with the name Parc Imstenrade.

== Gallery ==
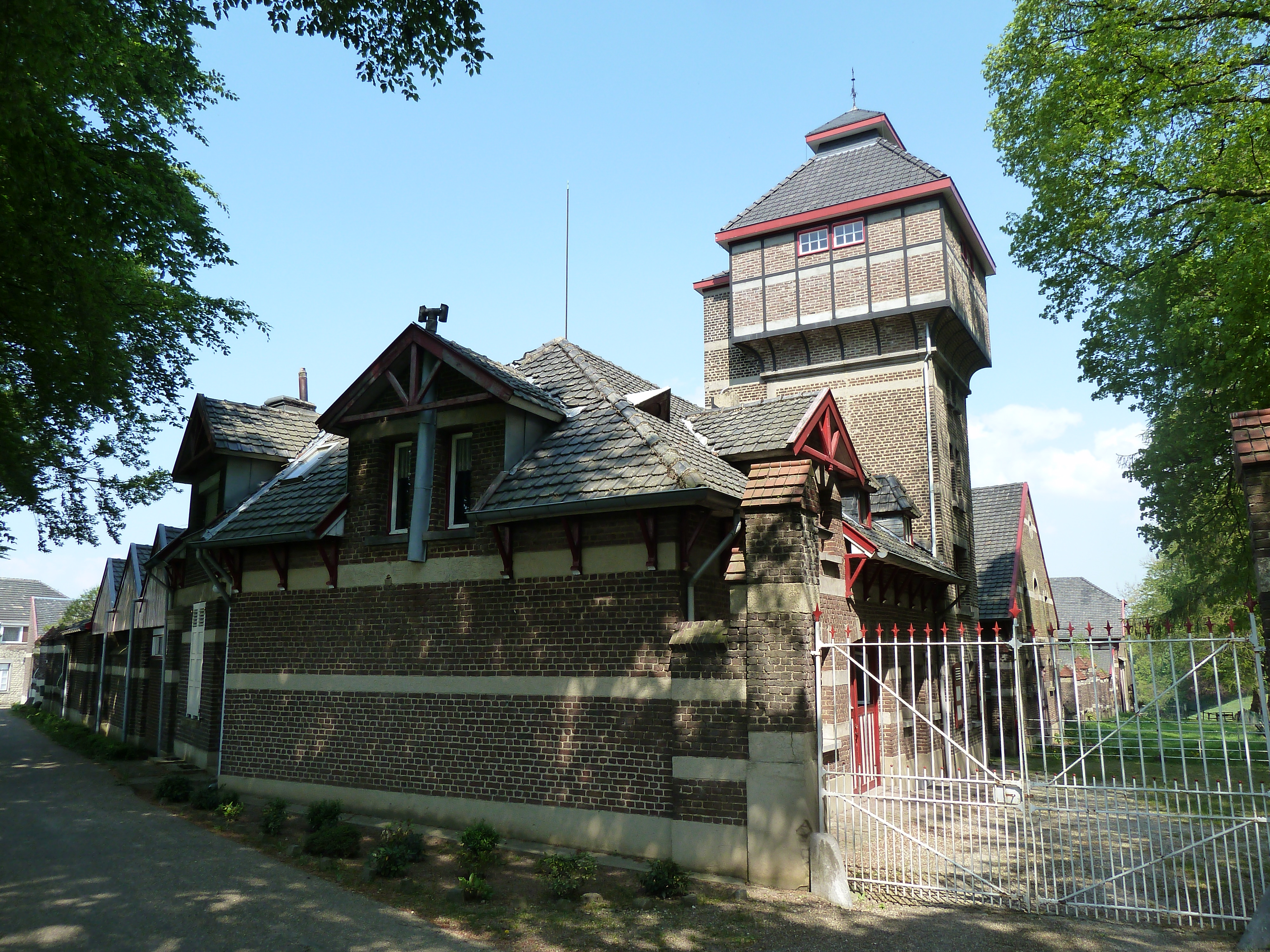
Farm and water tower

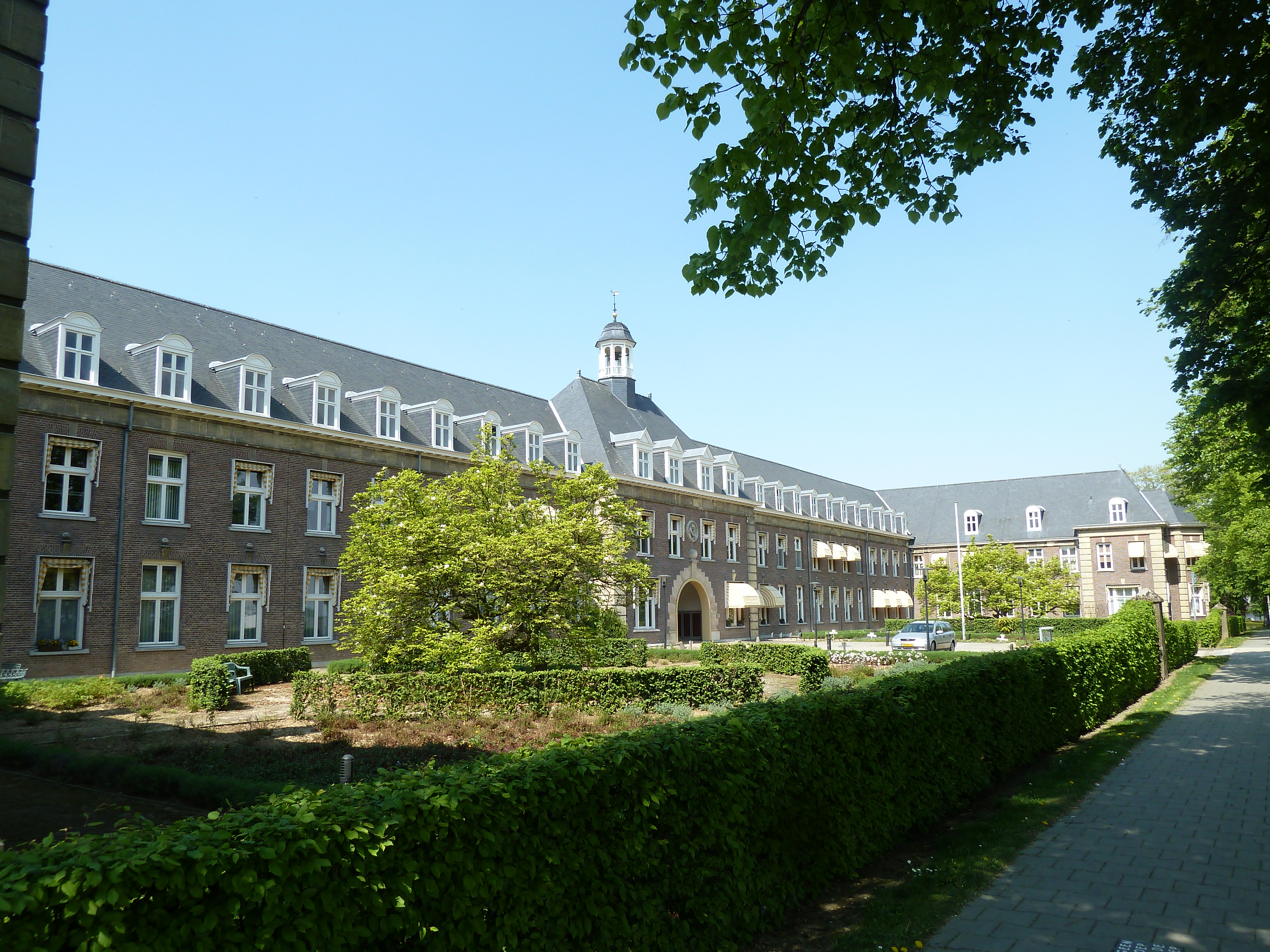
Midwifery school

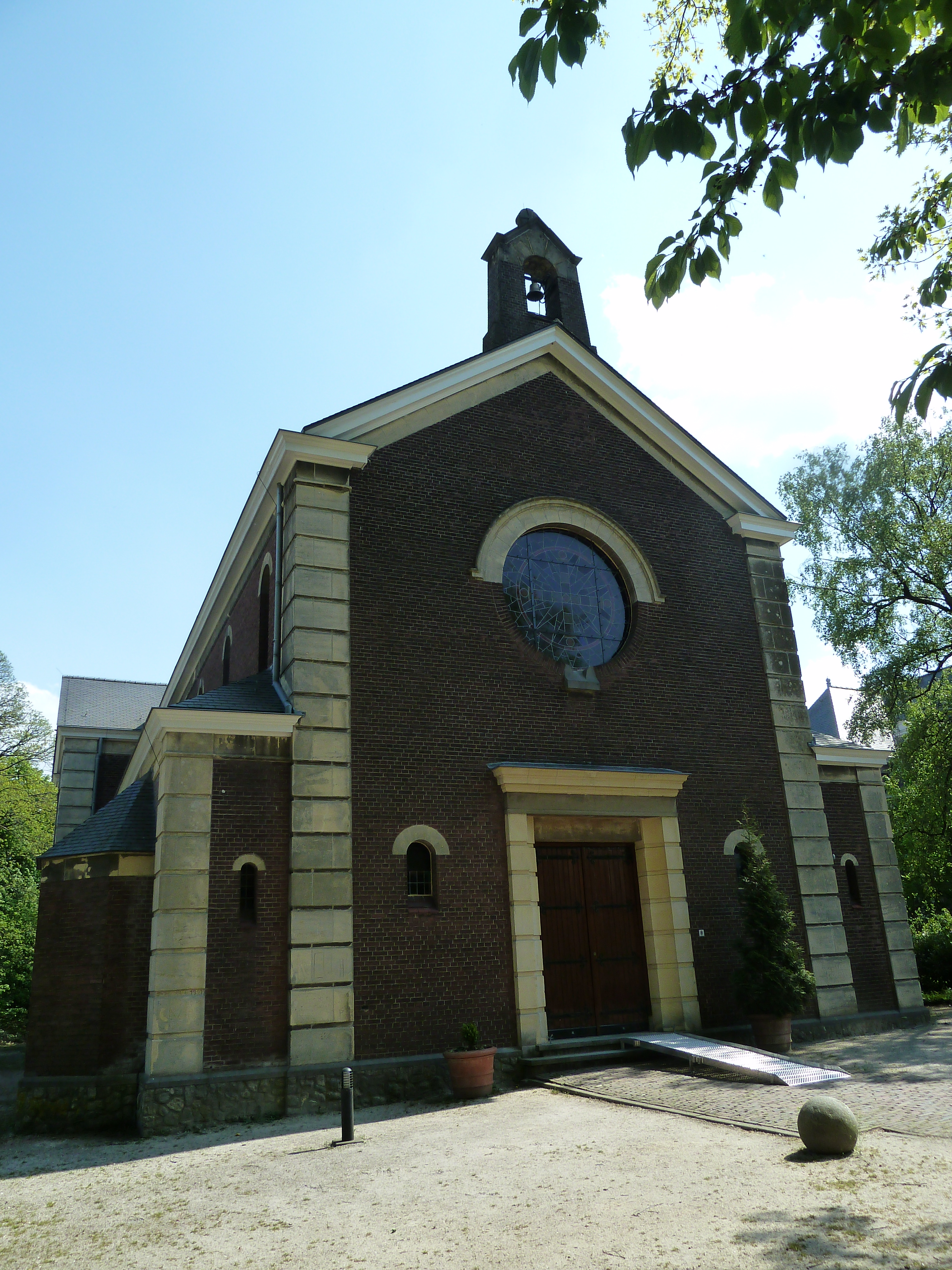
Saint Elisabeth Chapel

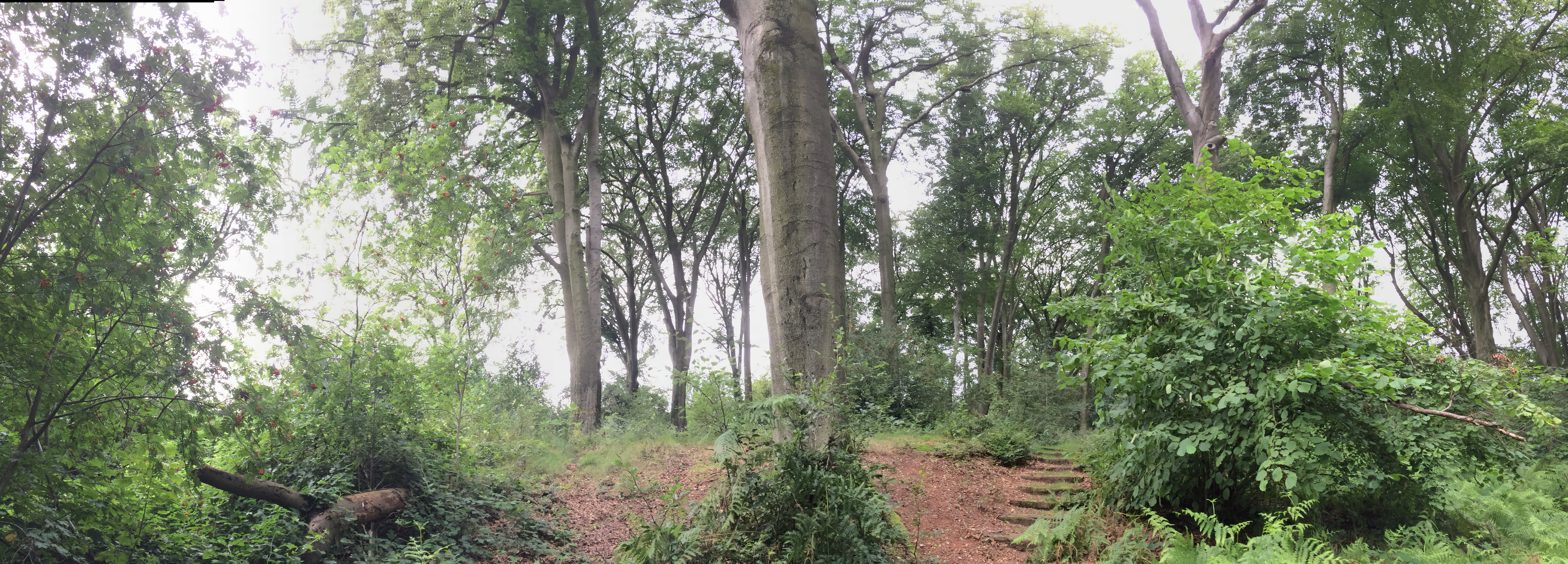
Imsteraderbos
