= Henri Ritzen =

Dutch painter

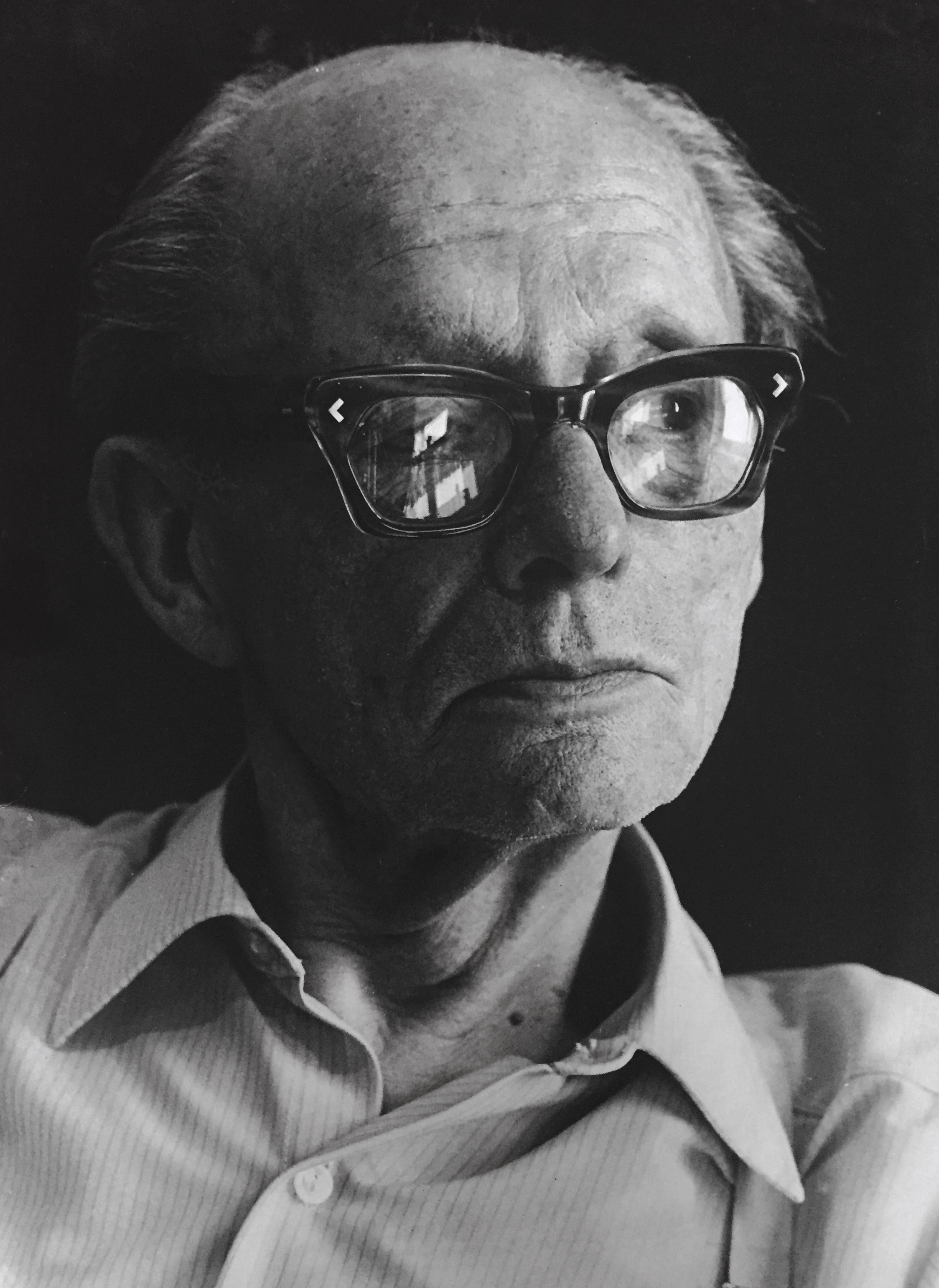
- Born: 21 May 1892; Schinnen, Netherlands
- Died: 8 April 1976 (aged 83); Schinnen, Netherlands
- Education: School voor Beeldende Kunsten in Roermond, Middelbare Kunstnijverheidsschool in Maastricht, Henri Jonas, and Jos Postmes
- Known for: Painting landscapes and religious scenes

Henri Ritzen (21 May 1892 – 8 April 1976) was a Dutch painter. He is chiefly known for painting landscapes and religious scenes.

== Biography ==
Ritzen took lessons at the School voor Beeldende Kunsten in Roermond and at the Middelbare Kunstnijverheidsschool (successor of the Stadsteekeninstituut) in Maastricht. His teachers were Jos Postmes and Henri Jonas. Ritzen made his debut in 1933 by exhibiting his work in his hometown of Schinnen. He also exhibited at group exhibitions organized by the Limburgse Kunstkring in the Stedelijk Museum in Maastricht.

In 1939–1940, three works by Ritzen were exhibited at Onze Kunst van Heden exhibition in the Rijksmuseum in Amsterdam. Following this exhibition, two of his works were selected for an exhibition in Brussels.

Ritzen seems to have had his peak in the period before the Second World War. His paintings from that period symbolize Limburg's popular feeling and religiosity. In the period after the war he had various exhibitions in Limburg that also attracted local attention.

Ritzen was not a full-time painter, he was also an art teacher at an evening vocational technical school in Sittard for many years and a local entrepreneur. He was also active in the local cultural community and volunteer within the church. At a later age he developed more as a modern abstract painter in which large areas of color were placed hard against each other.

In 1972, Ritzen became the first person to be named an honorary citizen of the municipality of Schinnen. In 2001 Ritzen was commemorated with an exhibition in Schinnen and a monograph was published about him.

== Works ==
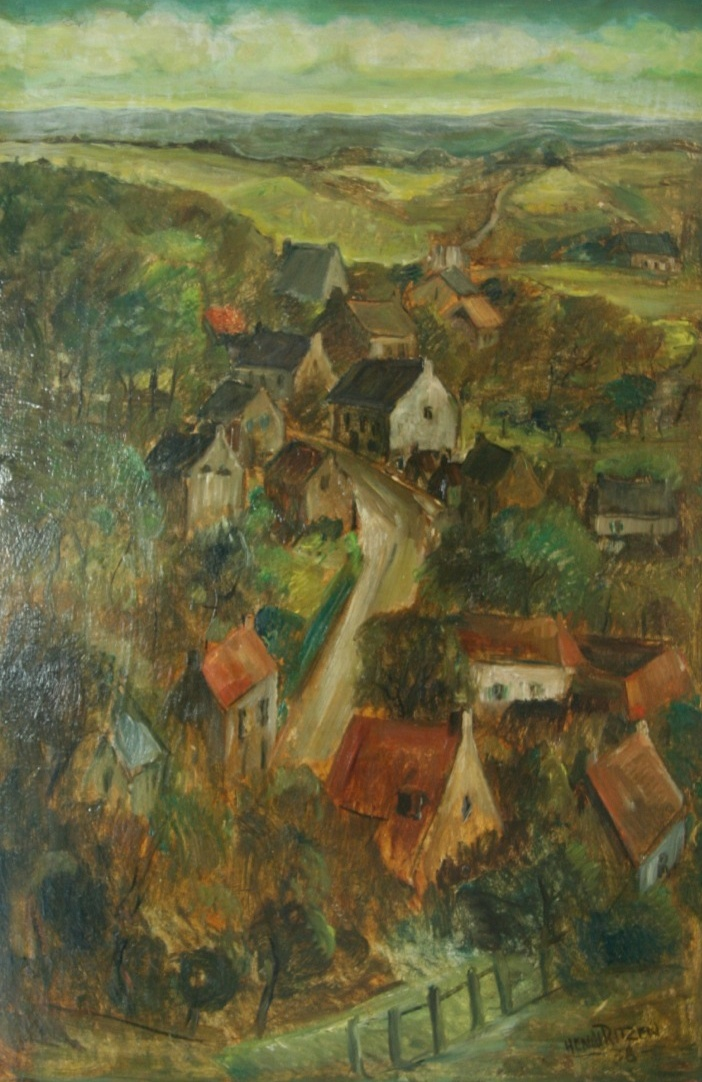
View over Vaesrade, 1938
