= Welten =

Village in Heerlen, the Netherlands

- Village
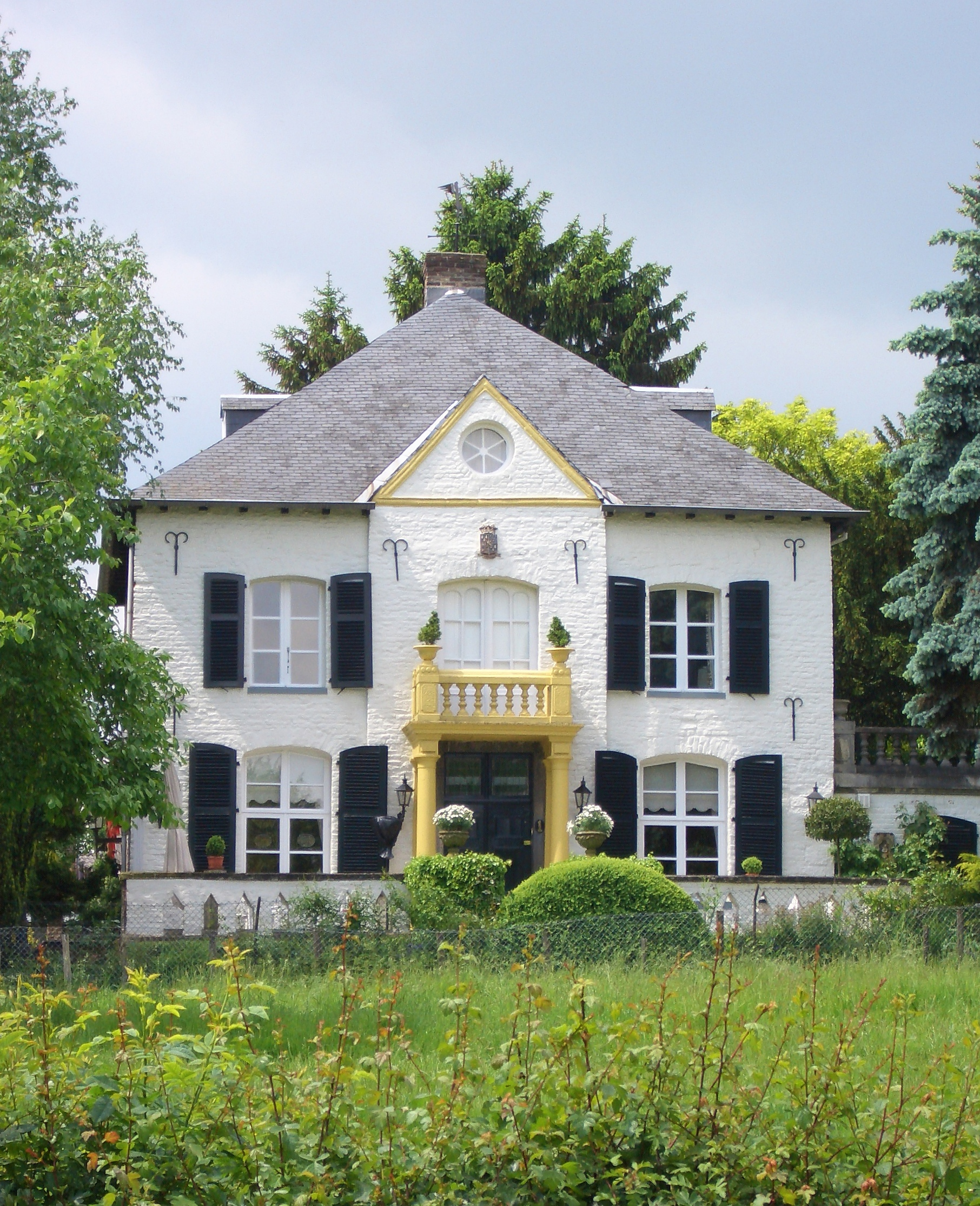
- A house overlooking the Weltervijver in Welten

- Location in Limburg
- Coordinates: 50°52′26″N 5°57′54″E
- Country: Netherlands
- Province: Limburg
- Municipality: Heerlen

Welten is a village in the municipality of Heerlen, located in the province of Limburg, the Netherlands. It is situated southwest of the Heerlen city centre.

== History ==
The earliest historical record of the area relates to a chapel dedicated to St Martin. A deed from 1061 by Udo of Toul mentions the chapel, indicating it existed as early as 1049. During its early history, the Welten chapel belonged to the parish of Voerendaal. The chapel fell into disrepair over the centuries and was restored by the States General of the Netherlands in 1661.

Welten remained dependent on other parishes until 1921, when it became an independent parish.

== Landmarks ==
=== Sint-Martinuskerk ===
The Sint-Martinuskerk (St Martin's Church) is a composite structure built over several decades. In 1875, a neo-Romanesque choir and transept designed by architect L. Oostwegel were added to the old chapel. Architect Joseph Seelen designed a neo-Gothic tower in 1897 to replace the original western tower. Between 1925 and 1927, Seelen constructed a new three-aisled basilica intersecting the older nave. This created a hybrid architectural layout built from local Kunradersteen, a regional variant of chalk.

=== Weltermolen and Weltervijver ===
The Weltermolen is a watermill situated on the Weltervijver, a local pond fed by the Geleenbeek stream. Historical documents first mention the mill in 1381 as the property of Huis Strijthagen, a local estate also known as Huis te Welten. The earliest recorded miller was Alexander van der Bruggen, who leased the facility in 1443.

The watermill features a 17th-century tower constructed from marl and brick, alongside a cast-iron water wheel installed in 1898. Following a period of decay after the Second World War, the municipality of Heerlen purchased and restored the complex. It was officially reopened in September 1982.
