= Jos Gielen =

Dutch politician (1898–1981)

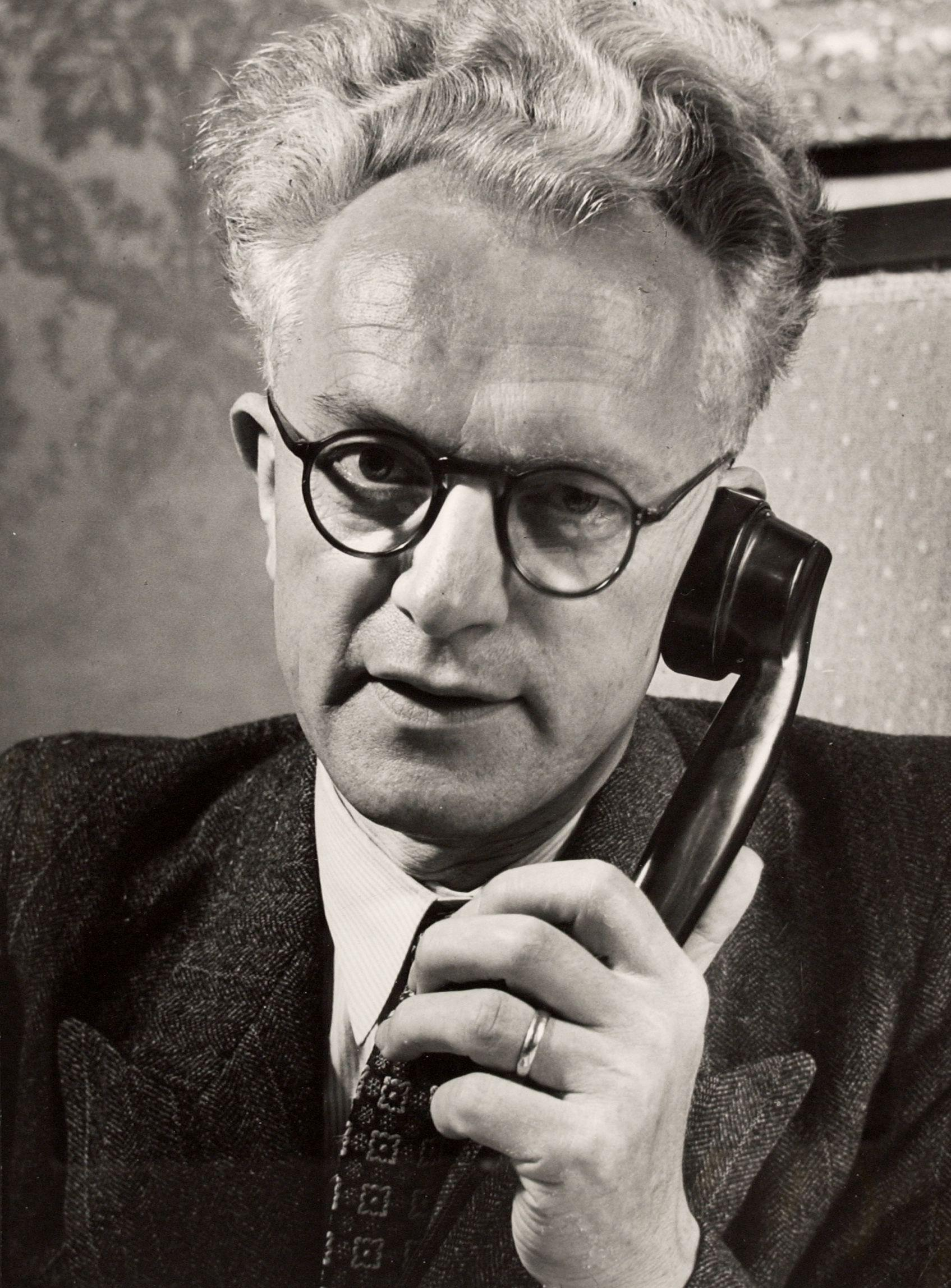
Jos Gielen in 1947

Jos Gielen (26 September 1898 in Rucphen – 6 August 1981 in Beneden-Leeuwen) was a Dutch politician of the Catholic People's Party and literary historian who served as Minister of Education in the First Beel cabinet from 1946 to 1948. From 1948 to 1949, he represented the KVP in the House of Representatives. Gielen died in Beneden-Leeuwen in 1981.
