= Heerlerbaan =

Heerlerbaan Heëlebaan
- Interactive map of Heerlerbaan
- Coordinates: 50°52′09″N 6°00′37″E
- Country: Netherlands
- Municipality: Heerlen
- Province: Limburg

Population (2008)
  - Total: 9,872

Heerlerbaan (Limburgish: Heëlebaan) is a former Dutch village located in the commune of Heerlen, in the province of Dutch Limburg. On 1 January 2008, the area, including the former village had 9872 inhabitants.
