= Schinnen =

Schinnen Sjènne
- Village and former municipality
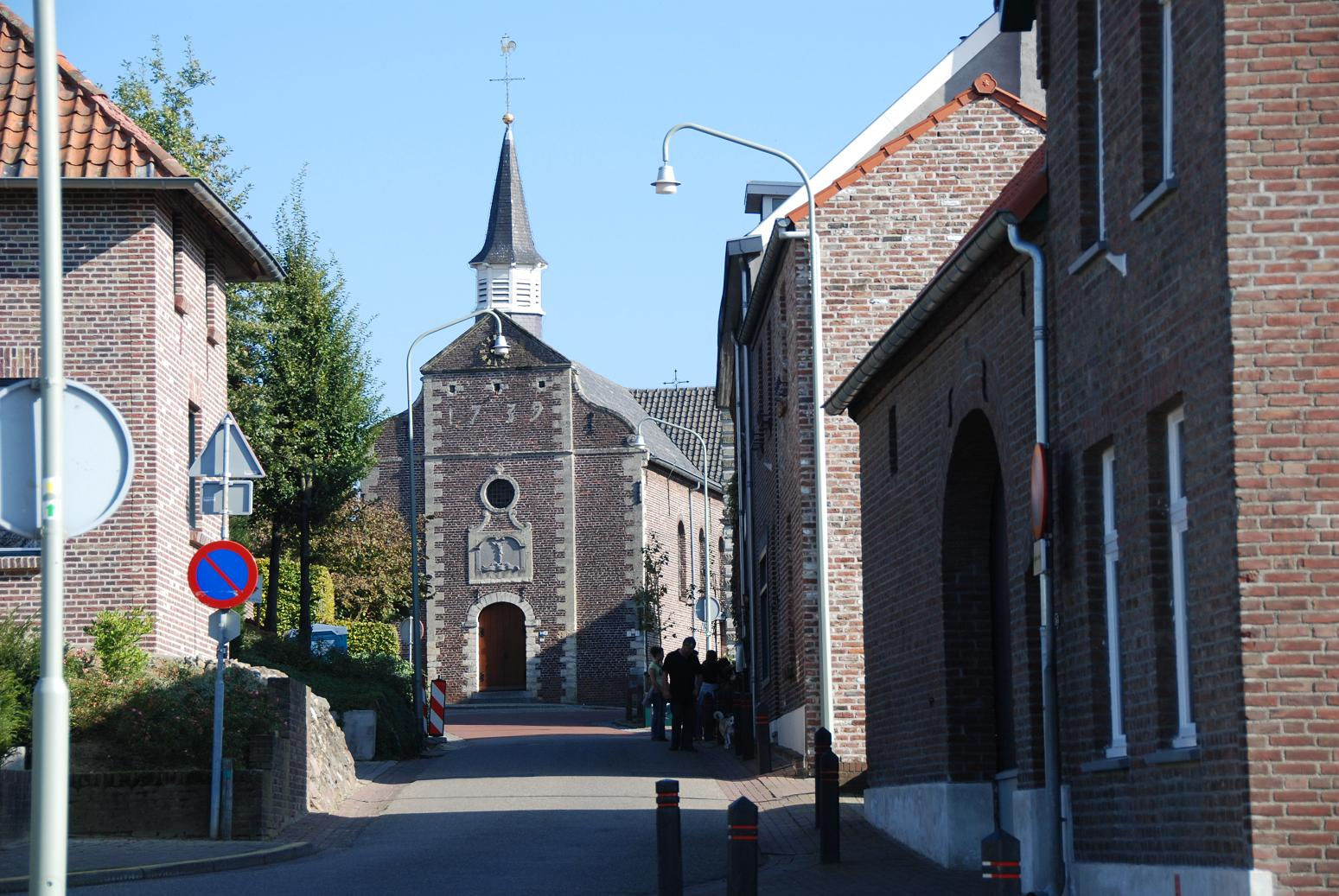
- Church in Sweikhuizen

- Flag Coat of arms

- Location in the Netherlands Location in the province of Limburg in the Netherlands
- Coordinates: 50°57′N 5°53′E
- Country: Netherlands
- Province: Limburg
- Municipality: Beekdaelen
- Merged: 2019

Area
  - Total: 2.36 km^{2} (0.91 sq mi)
- Elevation: 71 m (233 ft)

Population (2021)
  - Total: 1,545
  - Density: 655/km^{2} (1,700/sq mi)
- Time zone: UTC+1 (CET)
  - Summer (DST): UTC+2 (CEST)
- Postcode: 6365
- Area code: 046

Schinnen (Dutch pronunciation: [ˈsxɪnə(n)]; Limburgish: Sjènne [ˈʃɛnə]) is a village and a former municipality in the province of Limburg, Netherlands. It was home to US Army Garrison Schinnen, a support base for US personnel assigned to nearby Allied Joint Force Command Brunssum. It is also the location of Alfa Brewery, the only brewery in the Netherlands that uses an officially certified underground spring. In 2019, it merged with Nuth and Onderbanken to form the municipality of Beekdaelen.

== Cities and towns ==
- Amstenrade
- Doenrade
- Oirsbeek
- Puth
- Schinnen
- Sweikhuizen

=== Topography ===
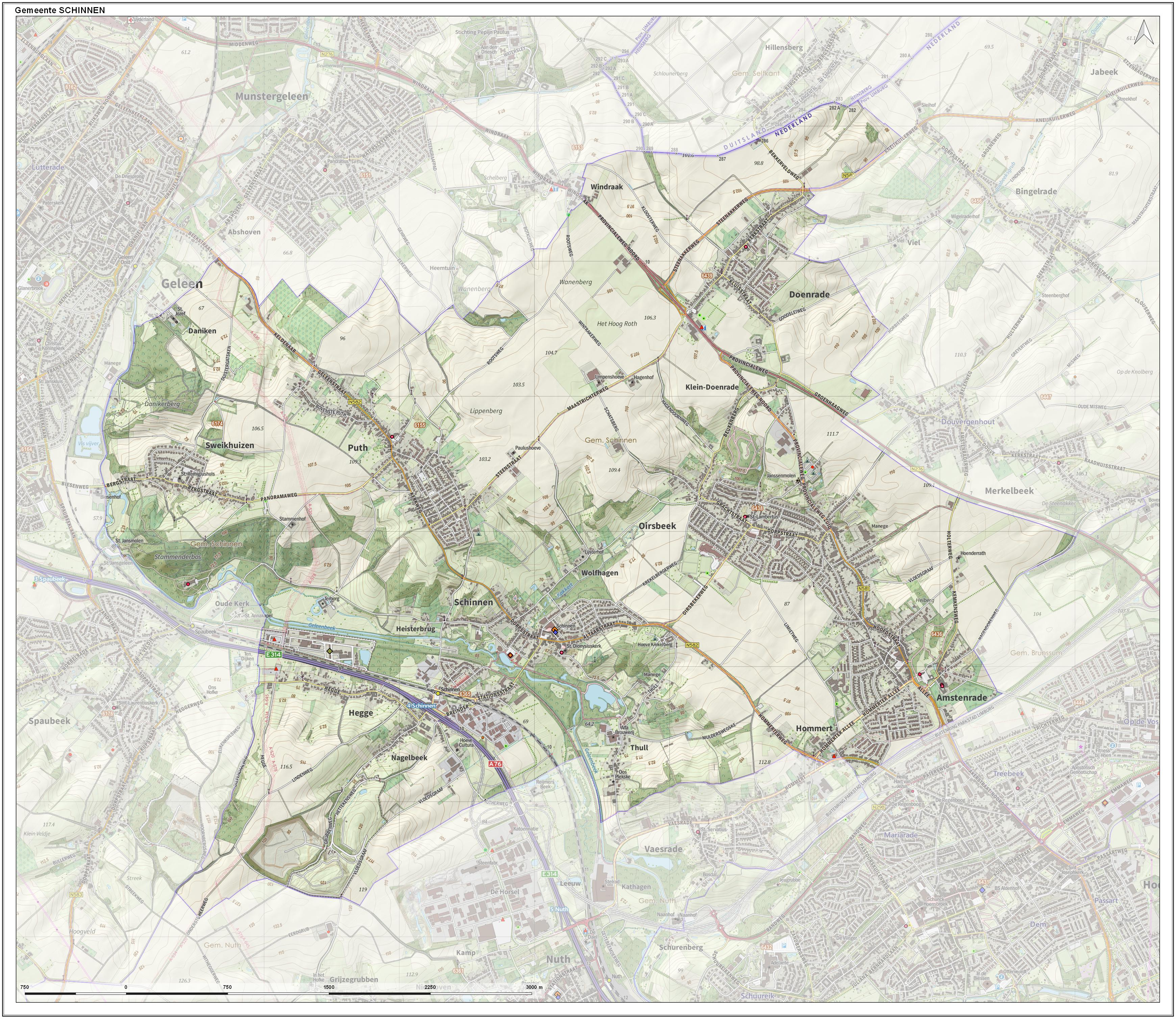

Dutch topographic map of the municipality of Schinnen, June 2015

== Notable people ==
- Hans Erkens (born 1952), AFC Ajax footballer
- Frans Körver (1937-2024), footballer
- Henk van der Linden (1925–2021), film director
- G. M. Nijssen (born 1938), computer scientist
- Henri Ritzen (1892–1976), painter
- Theo Rutten (1899–1980), politician and minister
- Julie Zwarthoed (born 1994), ice hockey player
