= Geleenbeek =

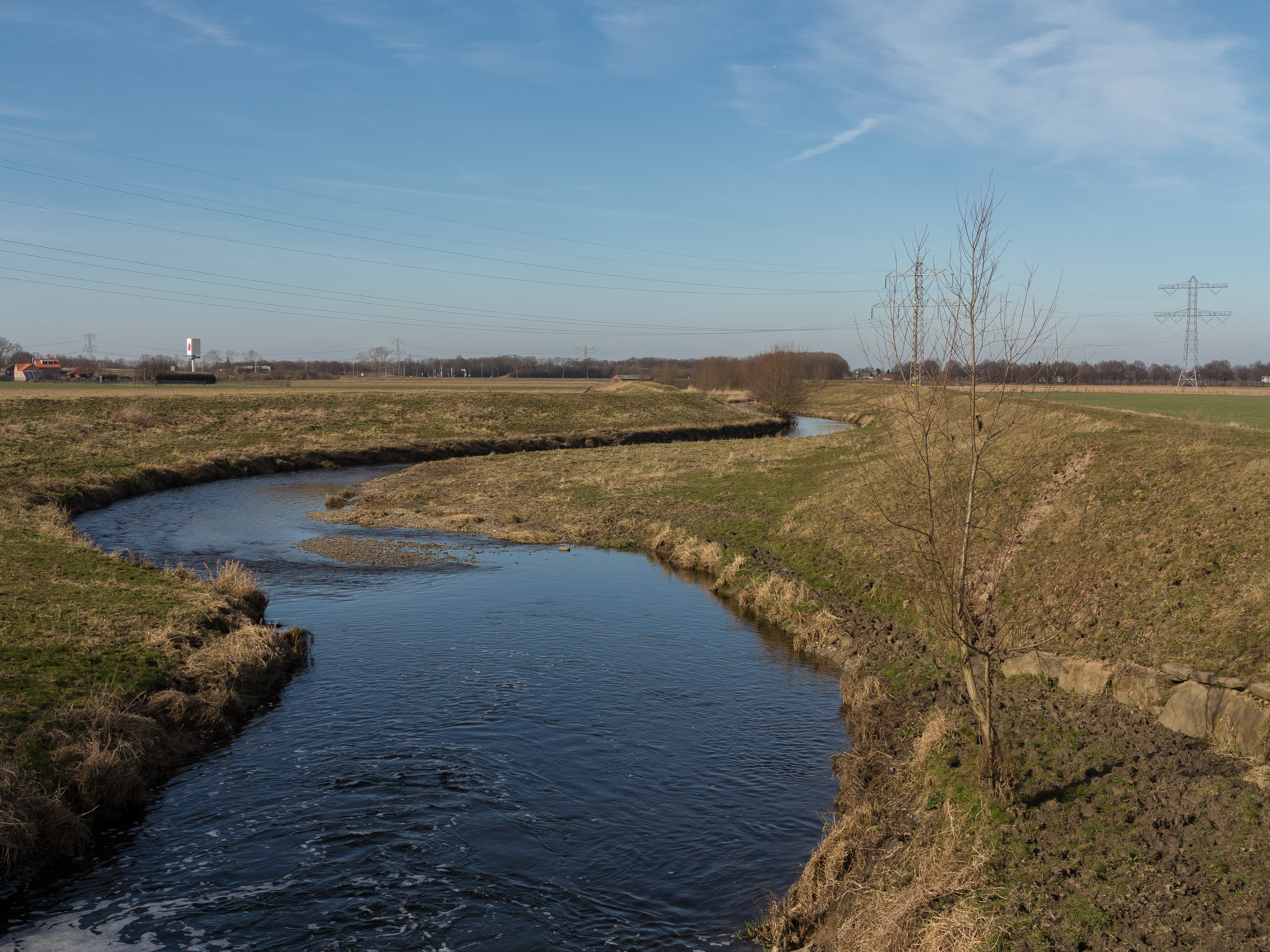
- The Geleenbeek near Susteren

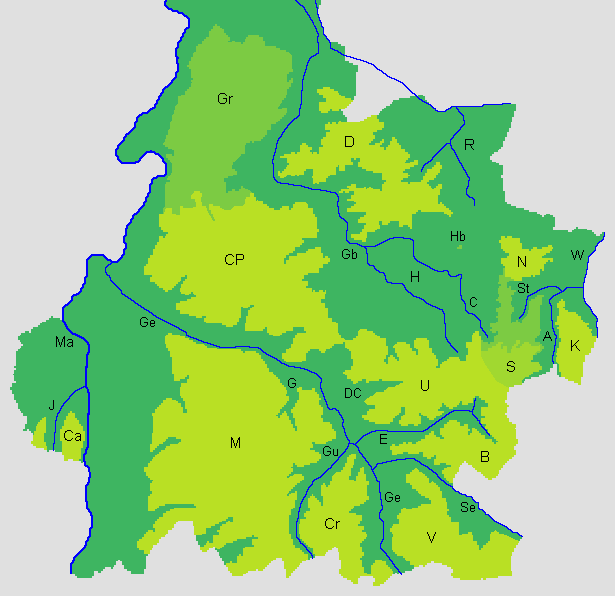
- The Geleenbeek (Gb) in South Limburg, with tributaries Roode Beek (R) and Caumerbeek (C).

Location
- Country: Netherlands
- Province: Limburg

Physical characteristics
- Mouth
  - location: Meuse
  - coordinates: 51.1199°N 5.8552°E
- Length: 44.7 km (27.8 mi)

Basin features
- Progression: Meuse→ North Sea

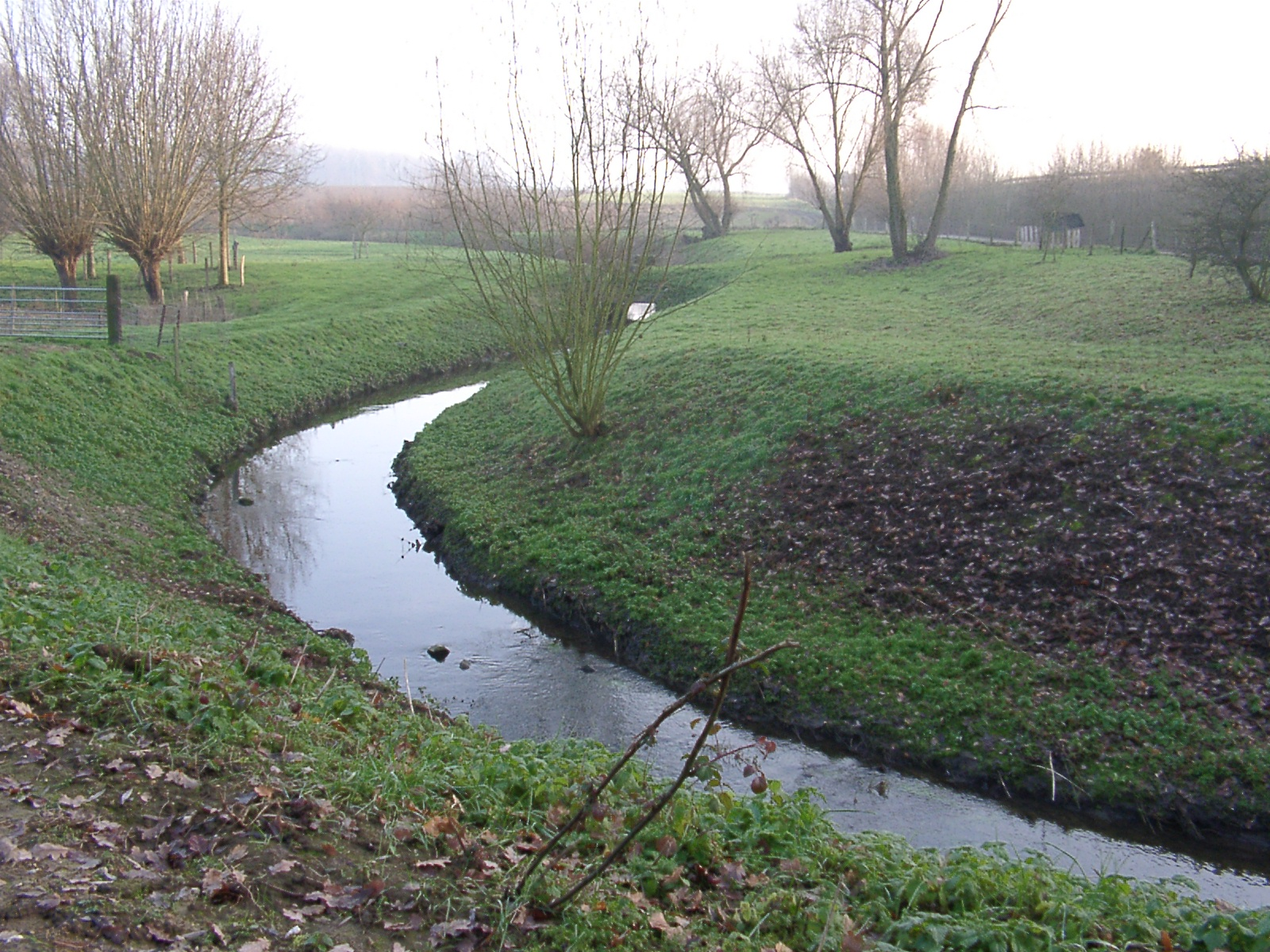
The Geleenbeek near Heerlen

The Geleenbeek (Dutch pronunciation: [ɣəˈleːmbeːk]; Limburgish: Gelaenbaek [ɣəˈlɛːmbɛːk]) is a river in Limburg, the Netherlands. Its source is near Benzenrade, a hamlet in the municipality of Heerlen. It flows generally northwest, along Nuth, Schinnen, Spaubeek, turns north at Geleen, flows through the centre of Sittard, and further north through Nieuwstadt until it flows into a branch of the Meuse at Stevensweert.

Its Latin name is "Glana", which means "bright brook".

== Restoration ==
The Geleenbeek was canalised in the 1950s, which reduced its ecological value and water quality. Since 2009, Waterschap Limburg and local municipalities have worked on the redevelopment of the Geleenbeek valley from its source in Benzenrade towards Sittard, under the project name Corio Glana. The restoration work aims to give the stream more space, improve ecological conditions and restore a more natural course in parts of the valley.

== Geleenbeek valley ==
Parts of the Geleenbeek valley are designated as the Natura 2000 area Geleenbeekdal. The valley is fed by calcareous seepage water and contains species-rich wet woodlands.
