= Religious tolerance =

A set of attitudes allowing or permitting a religion of which one disapproves

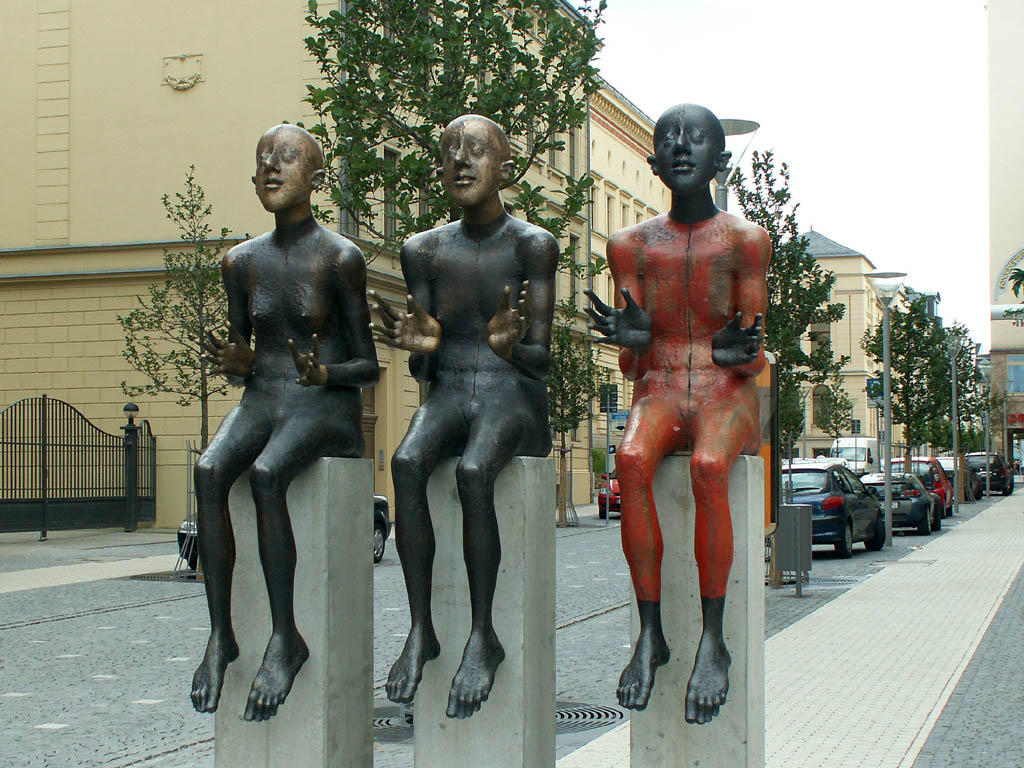
Sculpture Für Toleranz ("for tolerance") by Volkmar Kühn, Gera, Germany (2001)

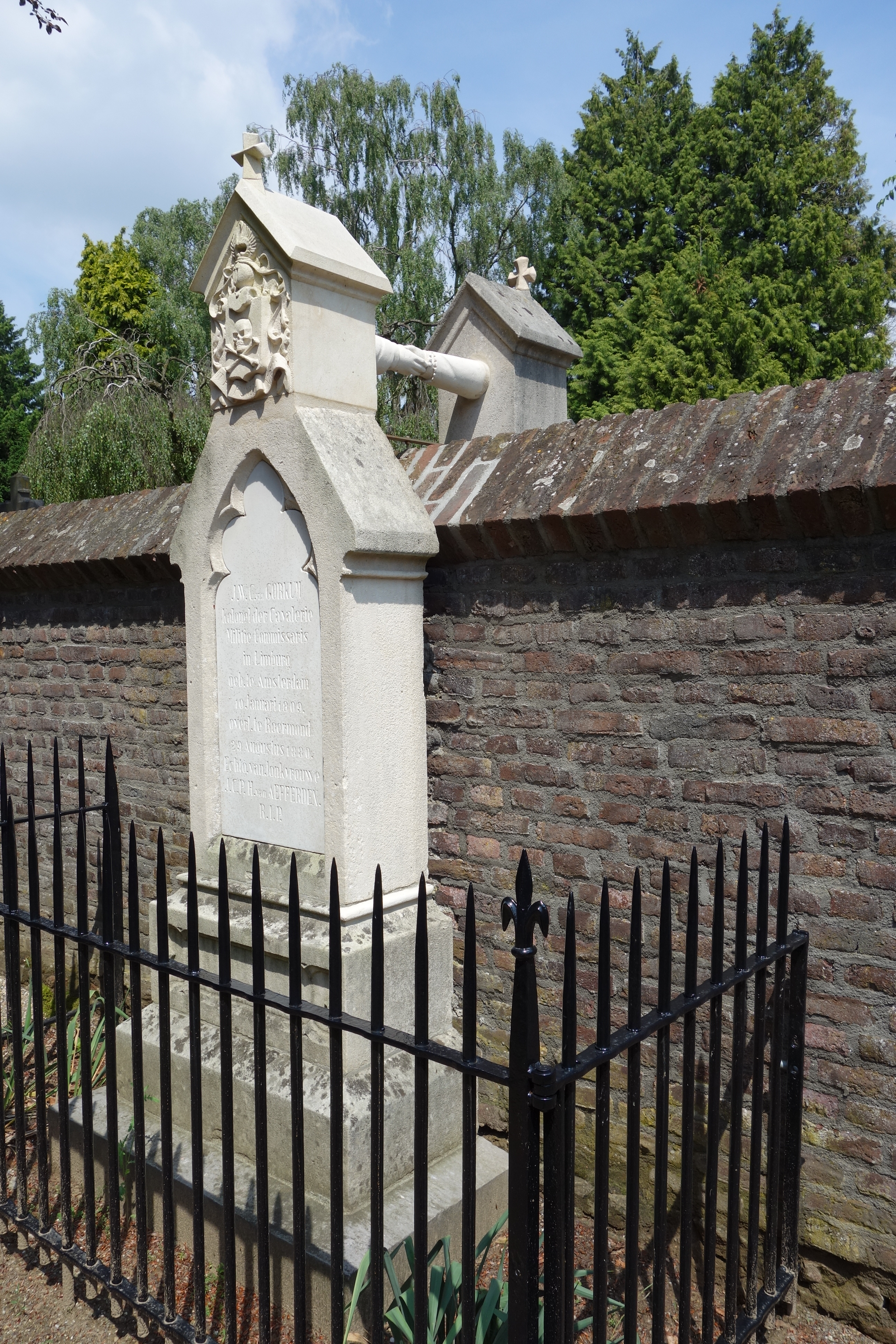
"Grave with the Hands" in Roermond. Jacob van Gorcum, a Protestant (of the Reformed Church), who died in 1880 and his wife Josephina, a Catholic, who died in 1888, are buried in the Protestant and Catholic sections of the cemetery respectively, but their tombs are joined by "hands" over the wall.

Religious tolerance is "a set of attitudes" resulting in the act of permitting a religion that one dislikes or disagrees with, while religious toleration may signify "no more than forbearance and the permission given by the adherents of a dominant religion for other religions to exist, even though the latter are looked on with disapproval as inferior, mistaken, or harmful". Historically, most incidents and writings pertaining to toleration involve the status of minority and dissenting viewpoints in relation to a dominant state religion. However, religion is also sociological, and the practice of toleration has always had a political aspect as well.

An overview of the history of toleration and different cultures in which toleration has been practiced, and the ways in which such a paradoxical concept has developed into a guiding one, illuminates its contemporary use as political, social, religious, and ethnic, applying to LGBT individuals and other minorities, and other connected concepts such as human rights.

== Definitions ==
The term "tolerance" derives from the Latin tolerantia, meaning "endurance" or "the ability to bear." For Cicero, tolerantia was a personal virtue—the capacity to endure hardship, injustice, or misfortune with composure. By the sixteenth century the notion of tolerance began to take on a more political dimension, associated with maintaining peace and social concord amid religious conflict. This is seen in developments like the 1555 Peace of Augsburg, even though the term itself was not explicitly invoked. Over time, the concept evolved from mere forbearance—what John Horton describes as "putting up with" disapproved beliefs—toward a broader commitment to recognizing and respecting diversity. Regarding the distinction between tolerance and toleration, political scientist Andrew R. Murphy explains that "[w]e can improve our understanding by defining 'toleration' as a set of social or political practices and 'tolerance' as a set of attitudes."

The concept of tolerance is multifaceted, shaped by various academic disciplines including philosophy, sociology, political science, religious studies, and law. Tolerance research reveals a plurality of interpretations, each contingent upon specific social, political, and cultural contexts. In antiquity, Cicero’s notion of tolerantia emphasized endurance in the face of adversity. Early modern thinkers such as Baruch Spinoza, Pierre Bayle, and John Locke explored tolerance primarily in political terms.

By the 18th century, Moses Mendelssohn advocated for religious tolerance as a fundamental human right, a position later expanded by figures such as John Rawls, who framed tolerance as a virtue of justice, and Michael Walzer, who linked it to the necessity of pluralism.

Scholars such as John Horton, David Heyd, and Anna Galeotti have further debated whether tolerance inherently involves disapproval or can be redefined as recognition. Key conditions for the emergence of tolerance include power dynamics, social conflict, and normative disagreement. As Karl Popper famously asserted, tolerance must have limits to prevent its self-destruction, particularly in the face of intolerance. Contemporary research emphasizes that tolerance involves both rejection and acceptance, underscoring its normative and complex nature. Thus, the ambiguity and contextuality of tolerance present significant challenges in arriving at a unified definition.

Renaissance humanism emphasized individual dignity, critical thinking, and ethical living over religious dogma. Thinkers such as Erasmus and Jean Bodin promoted tolerance by valuing personal conscience and diversity of belief. Their approach resisted both Catholic and Protestant intolerance, favoring persuasion over coercion and rejecting harsh condemnations of heresy. Humanist ideals later influenced Jean-Jacques Rousseau, who argued that a humane society must support “the positive welcoming and prizing of human individuality”.

Liberalism, particularly through John Stuart Mill, expanded the idea of tolerance beyond religion to include political and cultural pluralism. Mill defended the necessity of free expression, even of offensive ideas, as a path to truth and societal benefit. John Rawls later developed the theory of political liberalism, grounding it in equality, fairness, and a shared public reason that all citizens could endorse regardless of personal beliefs. However, critics like Adam Seligman caution that liberal tolerance sometimes becomes “principled indifference,” privatizing difference rather than engaging with it. Together, humanism and liberalism created philosophical foundations for modern notions of tolerance by emphasizing respect, equality, and freedom of conscience.

Religious tolerance has deep historical roots within religious and metaphysical traditions predating Enlightenment liberalism. In Jewish thought, Moses is depicted as an exemplar of tolerance (Numbers 12:3), a virtue further emphasized by Maimonides as essential for wise and just political leadership. Moses Mendelssohn articulated a metaphysical defense of religious diversity, viewing it as part of divine providence and necessary for spiritual and social perfection. Christian mysticism also contributed to early notions of tolerance by recognizing multiple paths to the divine, minimizing dogmatic authority. Figures such as Dionysios the Areopagite and Meister Eckhart highlighted individual spiritual experience and unity with the divine, allowing for varied approaches to ultimate reality. These traditions laid the groundwork for later concepts of tolerance by emphasizing respect for difference and the legitimacy of diverse religious expressions within a shared spiritual framework.

Contemporary scholarship has adopted an inclusive and active approach to defining religious tolerance. Twenty-first century definitions of religious tolerance have drawn upon sociological, anthropological, and psychological perspectives. Religious tolerance is now commonly understood as:

“people’s capacity or willingness to accept, respect, and coexist with differing viewpoints, beliefs, practices, or behaviours without resorting to aggression, discrimination, or conflict.”

Sociologist Charles Taylor emphasizes the importance of balancing “the autonomy of religious groups and the overarching principles of civic life” for a tolerant society. In a keynote speech, Ambassador Maurizio Massari stated that “tolerance is a key ingredient of democracy.” Recent studies indicate that individuals who feel accepted in inclusive societies are more likely to engage in civic and political life.Education and media literacy programs are seen as vital for cultivating tolerance. Psychological research by Hook and colleagues finds that intellectual humility in relation to religious beliefs encourages greater religious tolerance. This humility fosters openness to other perspectives, strengthens mutual understanding, and reduces defensiveness. Suryani and Muslim advocate incorporating religious tolerance into religious education curricula to address pluralism, social cohesion, interfaith respect, and open-mindedness. Research from Indonesia suggests that religious education in schools can promote interfaith understanding and tolerance.

The expanded concept of religious tolerance is increasingly linked to human rights, education, and LGBTQ+ rights. It is now seen as an evolving process of dialogue and active engagement, valuing all religious traditions within a pluralistic society. Modern conceptions of tolerance advocate not just coexistence, but the broader framework of religious freedom. Some scholars argue that "religious freedom" better expresses the commitment to equal dignity and personal growth, integrating with human rights and encouraging active respect over passive acceptance.

== In Antiquity ==
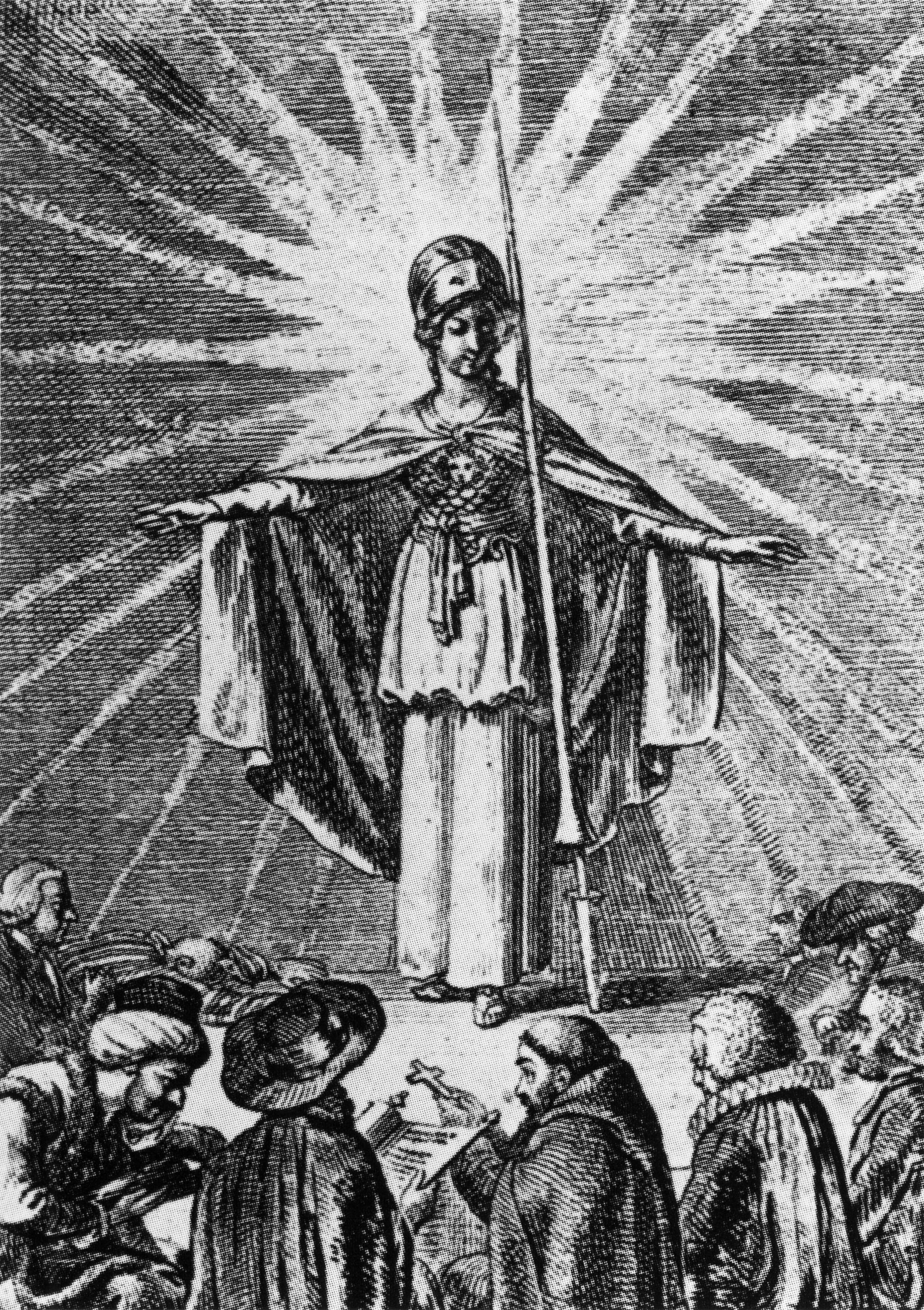
Minerva as a symbol of enlightened wisdom protects the believers of all religions (Daniel Chodowiecki, 1791)

Religious toleration has been described as a "remarkable feature" of the Achaemenid Empire of Persia. Cyrus the Great assisted in the restoration of the sacred places of various cities. In the Old Testament, Cyrus was said to have released the Jews from the Babylonian captivity in 539–530 BCE, and permitted their return to their homeland.

The Hellenistic city of Alexandria, founded 331 BCE, contained a large Jewish community which lived in peace with equivalently sized Greek and Egyptian populations. According to Michael Walzer, the city provided "a useful example of what we might think of as the imperial version of multiculturalism."

Before Christianity became the state church of the Roman Empire, it encouraged conquered peoples to continue worshipping their own gods. "An important part of Roman propaganda was its invitation to the gods of conquered territories to enjoy the benefits of worship within the imperium." Christians were singled out for persecution because of their own rejection of Roman pantheism and refusal to honor the emperor as a god. There were some other groups that found themselves to be exceptions to Roman tolerance, such as the Druids, the early followers of the cult of Isis, the Bacchanals, the Manichaens and the priests of Cybele, and Temple Judaism was also suppressed.

In the early 3rd century, Cassius Dio outlined the Roman imperial policy towards religious tolerance:

You should not only worship the divine everywhere and in every way in accordance with our ancestral traditions, but also force all others to honour it. Those who attempt to distort our religion with strange rites you should hate and punish, not only for the sake of the gods … but also because such people, by bringing in new divinities, persuade many folks to adopt foreign practices, which lead to conspiracies, revolts, and factions, which are entirely unsuitable for monarch".

— Dio Cassius, Hist. Rom. LII.36.1–2

In 311 CE, Roman Emperor Galerius issued a general edict of toleration of Christianity, in his own name and in those of Licinius and Constantine I (who converted to Christianity the following year).

Saint Catherine's Monastery of the Sinai region of Egypt claims to have once had possession of an original letter of protection from Mohammed, known as the Ashtiname of Muhammad and traditionally dated to 623 CE. The monastery's tradition holds that a Christian delegation from the Sinai requested for the continued activity of the monastery, and regional Christianity per se. The original no longer exists, but a claimed 16th century copy of it remains on display in the monastery. While several twentieth century scholars accepted the document as a legitimate original, some modern scholars now question the documentary's authenticity.

== Buddhism ==
Since the 19th century, Western intellectuals and spiritualists have viewed Buddhism as an unusually tolerant faith. James Freeman Clarke said in Ten Great Religions (1871) that "Buddhists have founded no Inquisition; they have combined the zeal which converted kingdoms with a toleration almost inexplicable to our Western experience." Bhikkhu Bodhi, an American-born Buddhist convert, stated:

Buddhist tolerance springs from the recognition that the dispositions and spiritual needs of human beings are too vastly diverse to be encompassed by any single teaching, and thus that these needs will naturally find expression in a wide variety of religious forms.

The Edicts of Ashoka issued by King Ashoka the Great (269–231 BCE), a Buddhist, declared ethnic and religious tolerance. His Edict in the 12th main stone writing of Girnar on the third century BCE which state that "Kings accepted religious tolerance and that Emperor Ashoka maintained that no one would consider his / her is to be superior to other and rather would follow a path of unity by accruing the essence of other religions".

However, Buddhism has also had controversies regarding toleration. In addition, the question of possible intolerance among Buddhists in Sri Lanka and Myanmar has been raised by Paul Fuller.

== Christianity ==
The "Old testament" books of Exodus, Leviticus and Deuteronomy, common to Judaism and Christianity, emphasize God's commandment to ensure that strangers are treated well. For example, Exodus 22:21 says: "Thou shalt neither vex a stranger, nor oppress him: for ye were strangers in the land of Egypt". Throughout the biblical text, ancient Hebrews are reminded to respect the foreigners/resident aliens who are under God's special protection as well as the two other most vulnerable categories: the widows and the orphans. One of these mentions is in Deuteronomy 10:17-18. These texts are frequently used in sermons to teach compassion and tolerance for those who are different. Julia Kristeva elucidated a philosophy of political and religious toleration based on all of our mutual identities as strangers.

The New Testament Parable of the Tares, which speaks of the difficulty of distinguishing wheat from weeds before harvest time, has also been invoked in support of religious toleration. In his "Letter to Bishop Roger of Chalons", Bishop Wazo of Liege (c. 985–1048) relied on the parable to argue that "the church should let dissent grow with orthodoxy until the Lord comes to separate and judge them".

Roger Williams used this parable to support government toleration of all of the "weeds" (heretics) in the world, because civil persecution often inadvertently hurts the "wheat" (believers) too. Instead, Williams believed it was God's duty to judge in the end, not man's. This parable lent further support to Williams' belief in a wall of separation between church and state as described in his 1644 book, The Bloody Tenent of Persecution.

=== Middle Ages ===
In the Middle Ages, there were instances of toleration of particular groups. The Latin concept tolerantia was a "highly-developed political and judicial concept in medieval scholastic theology and canon law." Tolerantia was used to "denote the self-restraint of a civil power in the face of" outsiders, like infidels, Muslims or Jews, but also in the face of social groups like prostitutes and lepers. Heretics such as the Cathari, Waldensians, Jan Hus, and his followers, the Hussites, were persecuted. Later theologians belonging or reacting to the Protestant Reformation began discussion of the circumstances under which dissenting religious thought should be permitted. Toleration "as a government-sanctioned practice" in Christian countries, "the sense on which most discussion of the phenomenon relies—is not attested before the sixteenth century".

==== Unam sanctam and Extra Ecclesiam nulla salus ====
Centuries of Roman Catholic intoleration of other faiths was exemplified by Unam sanctam, a papal bull issued by Pope Boniface VIII on 18 November 1302. The bull laid down dogmatic propositions on the unity of the Catholic Church, the necessity of belonging to it for eternal salvation (Extra Ecclesiam nulla salus), the position of the Pope as supreme head of the Church, and the duty thence arising of submission to the Pope in order to belong to the Church and thus to attain salvation. The bull ends, "Furthermore, we declare, we proclaim, we define that it is absolutely necessary for salvation that every human creature be subject to the Roman Pontiff."

==== Tolerance of the Jews ====
In Poland in 1264, the Statute of Kalisz was issued, guaranteeing freedom of religion for the Jews in the country.

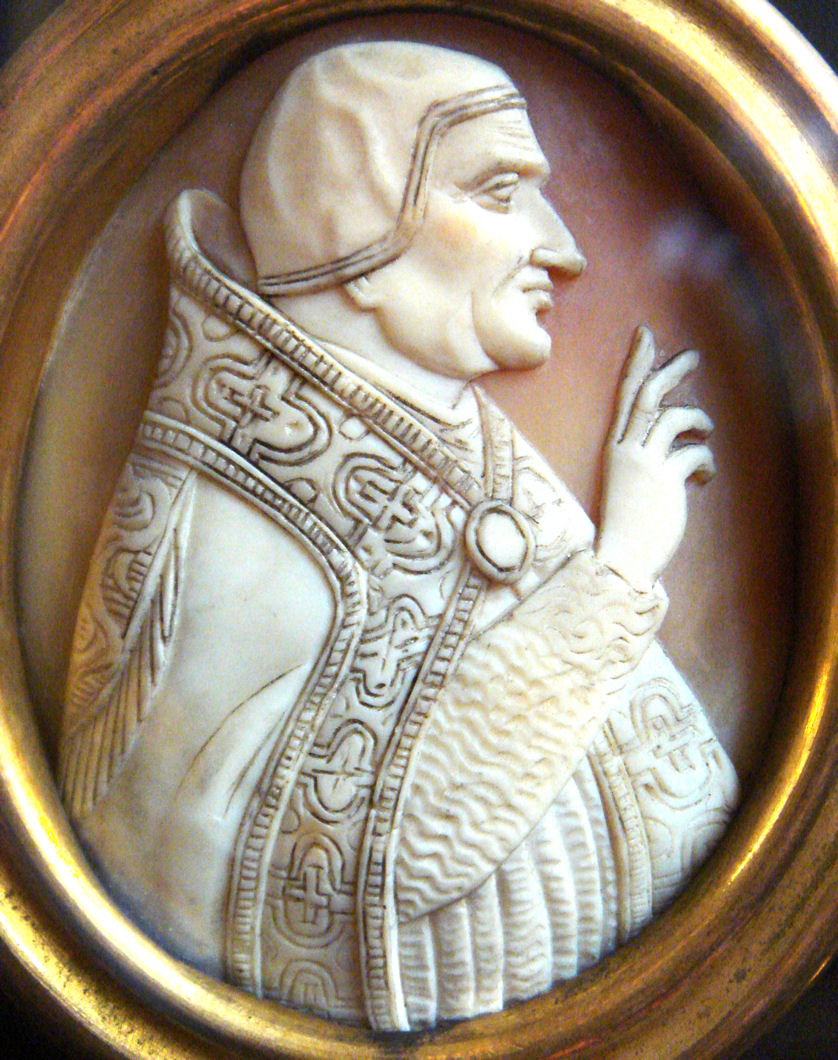
Clement VI

In 1348, Pope Clement VI (1291–1352) issued a bull pleading with Catholics not to murder Jews, whom they blamed for the Black Death. He noted that Jews died of the plague like anyone else, and that the disease also flourished in areas where there were no Jews. Christians who blamed and killed Jews had been "seduced by that liar, the Devil". He took Jews under his personal protection at Avignon, but his calls for other clergy to do so failed to be heeded.

Johann Reuchlin (1455–1522) was a German humanist and a scholar of Greek and Hebrew who opposed efforts by Johannes Pfefferkorn, backed by the Dominicans of Cologne, to confiscate all religious texts from the Jews as a first step towards their forcible conversion to the Catholic religion.

Despite occasional spontaneous episodes of pogroms and killings, as during the Black Death, Polish–Lithuanian Commonwealth was a relatively tolerant home for the Jews in the medieval period. In 1264, the Statute of Kalisz guaranteed safety, personal liberties, freedom of religion, trade, and travel to Jews. By the mid-16th century, the Polish–Lithuanian Commonwealth was home to 80% of the world's Jewish population. Jewish worship was officially recognized, with a Chief Rabbi originally appointed by the monarch. Jewish property ownership was also protected for much of the period, and Jews entered into business partnerships with members of the nobility.

==== Vladimiri ====
Paulus Vladimiri (c. 1370–1435) was a Polish scholar and rector who at the Council of Constance in 1414, presented a thesis, Tractatus de potestate papae et respectu infidelium (Treatise on the Power of the Pope and the Emperor Respecting Infidels). In it he argued that pagan and Christian nations could coexist in peace and criticized the Teutonic Order for its wars of conquest of native non-Christian peoples in Prussia and Lithuania. Vladimiri strongly supported the idea of conciliarism and pioneered the notion of peaceful coexistence among nations—a forerunner of modern theories of human rights. Throughout his political, diplomatic and university career, he expressed the view that a world guided by the principles of peace and mutual respect among nations was possible and that pagan nations had a right to peace and to possession of their own lands.

==== Erasmus ====
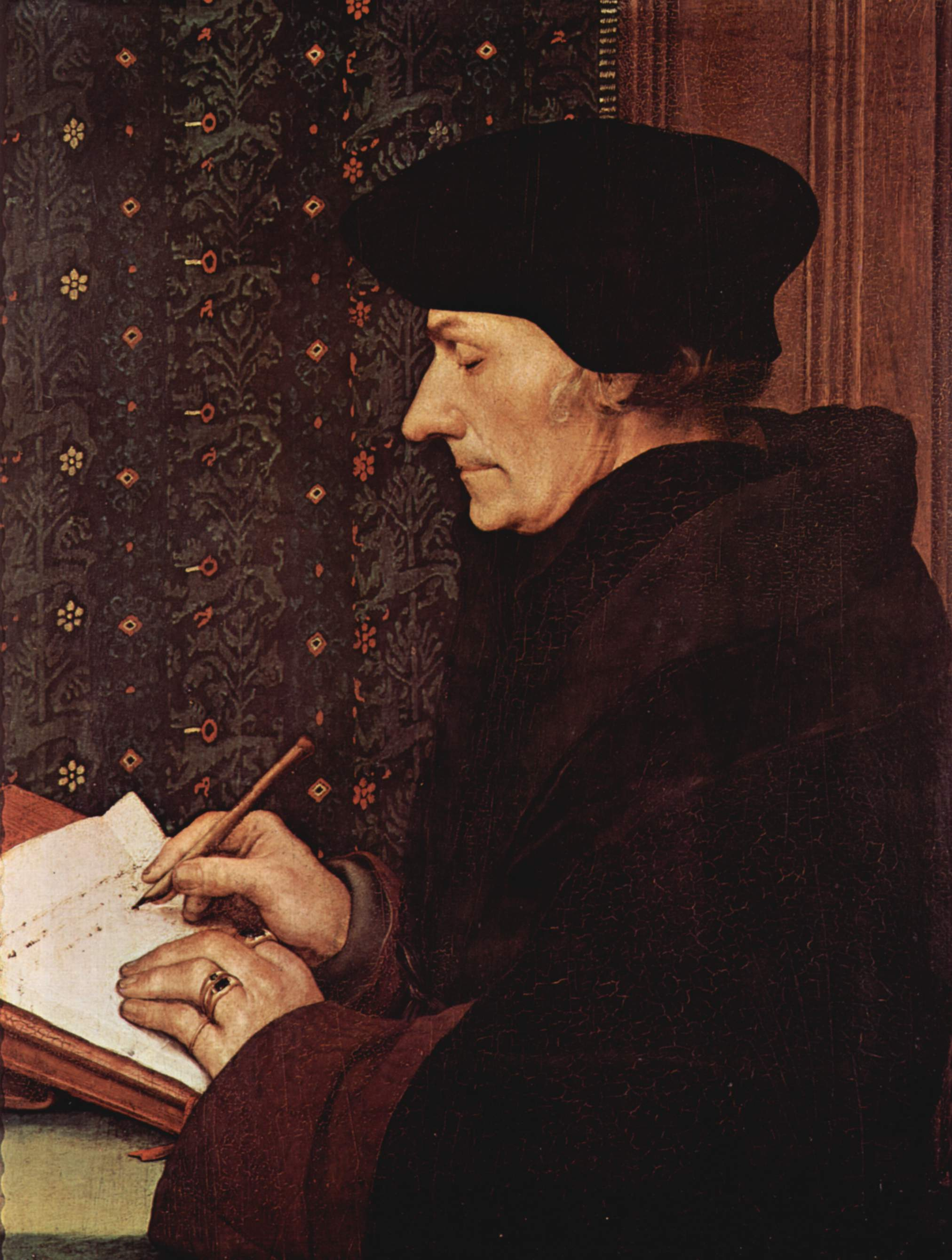
Erasmus

Desiderius Erasmus Roterodamus (1466–1536), was a Dutch Renaissance humanist and Catholic whose works laid a foundation for religious toleration. For example, in De libero arbitrio, opposing certain views of Martin Luther, Erasmus noted that religious disputants should be temperate in their language, "because in this way the truth, which is often lost amidst too much wrangling may be more surely perceived." Gary Remer writes, "Like Cicero, Erasmus concludes that truth is furthered by a more harmonious relationship between interlocutors." Although Erasmus did not oppose the punishment of heretics, in individual cases he generally argued for moderation and against the death penalty. He wrote, "It is better to cure a sick man than to kill him."

==== More ====
Saint Thomas More (1478–1535), Catholic Lord Chancellor of King Henry VIII and author, described a world of almost complete religious toleration in Utopia (1516), in which the Utopians "can hold various religious beliefs without persecution from the authorities." However, More's work is subject to various interpretations, and it is not clear that he felt that earthly society should be conducted the same way as in Utopia. Thus, in his three years as Lord Chancellor, More actively approved of the persecution of those who sought to undermine the Catholic faith in England.

=== Reformation ===
At the Diet of Worms (1521), Martin Luther refused to recant his beliefs citing freedom of conscience as his justification. According to Historian Hermann August Winkler, the individual's freedom of conscience became the hallmark of Protestantism. Luther was convinced that faith in Jesus Christ was the free gift of the Holy Spirit and could therefore not be forced on a person. Heresies could not be met with force, but with preaching the gospel revealed in the Bible. Luther: "Heretics should not be overcome with fire, but with written sermons." In Luther's view, the worldly authorities were entitled to expel heretics. Only if they undermine the public order, should they be executed. Later proponents of tolerance such as Sebastian Franck and Sebastian Castellio cited Luther's position. He had overcome, at least for the Protestant territories and countries, the violent medieval criminal procedures of dealing with heretics. But Luther remained rooted in the Middle Ages insofar as he considered the Anabaptists' refusal to take oaths, do military service, and the rejection of private property by some Anabaptist groups to be a political threat to the public order which would inevitably lead to anarchy and chaos. So Anabaptists were persecuted not only in Catholic but also in Lutheran and Reformed territories. However, a number of Protestant theologians such as John Calvin, Martin Bucer, Wolfgang Capito, and Johannes Brenz as well as Landgrave Philip of Hesse opposed the execution of Anabaptists. Ulrich Zwingli demanded the expulsion of persons who did not accept the Reformed beliefs, in some cases the execution of Anabaptist leaders. The young Michael Servetus also defended tolerance since 1531, in his letters to Johannes Oecolampadius, but during those years some Protestant theologians such as Bucer and Capito publicly expressed they thought he should be persecuted. The trial against Servetus, an Antitrinitarian, in Geneva was not a case of church discipline but a criminal procedure based on the legal code of the Holy Roman Empire. Denying the Trinity doctrine was long considered to be the same as atheism in all churches. The Anabaptists made a considerable contribution to the development of tolerance in the early-modern era by repeatedly demanding freedom of conscience and standing up for it with their patient suffering.

==== Castellio ====
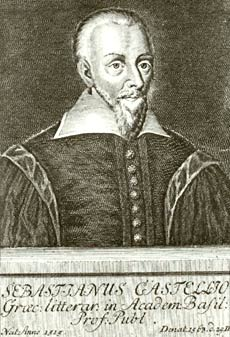
Castellio

Sebastian Castellio (1515–1563) was a French Protestant theologian who in 1554 published under a pseudonym the pamphlet Whether heretics should be persecuted (De haereticis, an sint persequendi) criticizing John Calvin's execution of Michael Servetus: "When Servetus fought with reasons and writings, he should have been repulsed by reasons and writings." Castellio concluded: "We can live together peacefully only when we control our intolerance. Even though there will always be differences of opinion from time to time, we can at any rate come to general understandings, can love one another, and can enter the bonds of peace, pending the day when we shall attain unity of faith." Castellio is remembered for the often quoted statement, "To kill a man is not to protect a doctrine, but it is to kill a man.

==== Bodin ====
Jean Bodin (1530–1596) was a French Catholic jurist and political philosopher. His Latin work Colloquium heptaplomeres de rerum sublimium arcanis abditis ("The Colloqium of the Seven") portrays a conversation about the nature of truth between seven cultivated men from diverse religious or philosophical backgrounds: a natural philosopher, a Calvinist, a Muslim, a Roman Catholic, a Lutheran, a Jew, and a skeptic. All agree to live in mutual respect and tolerance.

==== Montaigne ====
Michel de Montaigne (1533–1592), French Catholic essayist and statesman, moderated between the Catholic and Protestant sides in the Wars of Religion. Montaigne's theory of skepticism led to the conclusion that we cannot precipitously decide the error of others' views. Montaigne wrote in his famous "Essais": "It is putting a very high value on one's conjectures, to have a man roasted alive because of them...To kill people, there must be sharp and brilliant clarity."

==== Edict of Torda ====
In 1568, King John II Sigismund of Hungary, encouraged by his Unitarian Minister Francis David (Dávid Ferenc), issued the Edict of Torda decreeing religious toleration of all Christian denominations except Romanian Orthodoxy. It did not apply to Jews or Muslims but was nevertheless an extraordinary achievement of religious tolerance by the standards of 16th-century Europe.

==== Maximilian II ====
In 1571, Holy Roman Emperor Maximilian II granted religious toleration to the nobles of Lower Austria, their families and workers.

==== The Warsaw Confederation, 1573 ====
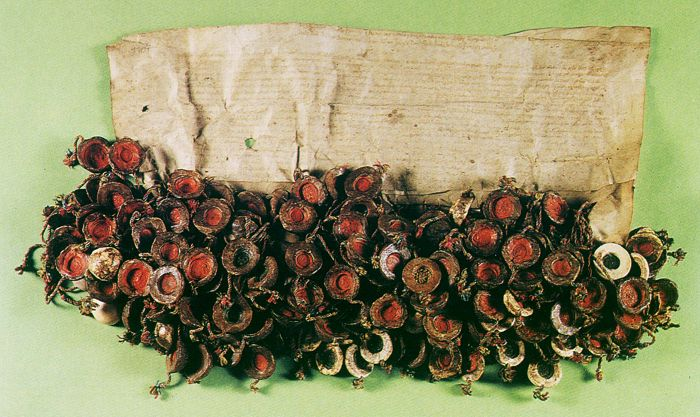
Original act of the Warsaw Confederation 1573 – the official sanctioning of religious freedom in the Polish–Lithuanian Commonwealth

The Polish–Lithuanian Commonwealth had a long tradition of religious freedom. The right to worship freely was a basic right given to all inhabitants of the Commonwealth throughout the 15th and early 16th centuries, however complete freedom of religion was officially recognized in the Polish–Lithuanian Commonwealth in 1573 in the Warsaw Confederation. The Commonwealth kept religious-freedom laws during an era when religious persecution was an everyday occurrence in the rest of Europe.

The Warsaw Confederation was a private compact signed by representatives of all the major religions in Polish and Lithuanian society, in which they pledged each other mutual support and tolerance. The confederation was incorporated into the Henrican articles, which constituted a virtual Polish–Lithuanian constitution.

==== Edict of Nantes ====
The Edict of Nantes, issued on April 13, 1598, by Henry IV of France, granted Protestants—notably Calvinist Huguenots—substantial rights in a nation where Catholicism was the state religion. The main concern was civil unity—the edict separated civil law from religious rights, treated non-Catholics as more than mere schismatics and heretics for the first time, and opened a path for secularism and tolerance. In offering general freedom of conscience to individuals, the edict offered many specific concessions to the Protestants, such as amnesty and the reinstatement of their civil rights, including the right to work in any field or for the State, and to bring grievances directly to the king. The edict marked the end of the religious wars in France that tore apart the population during the second half of the 16th century.

The Edict of Nantes was revoked in 1685 by Louis XIV with the Edict of Fontainebleau, leading to renewed persecution of Protestants in France. Although strict enforcement of the revocation was relaxed during the reign of Louis XV, it was not until 102 years later, in 1787, when Louis XVI signed the Edict of Versailles—known as the Edict of Tolerance—that civil status and rights to form congregations by Protestants were restored.

=== The Enlightenment ===
Beginning in the Enlightenment commencing in the 1600s, politicians and commentators began formulating theories of religious toleration and basing legal codes on the concept. A distinction began to develop between civil tolerance, concerned with "the policy of the state towards religious dissent"., and ecclesiastical tolerance, concerned with the degree of diversity tolerated within a particular church.

==== Milton ====
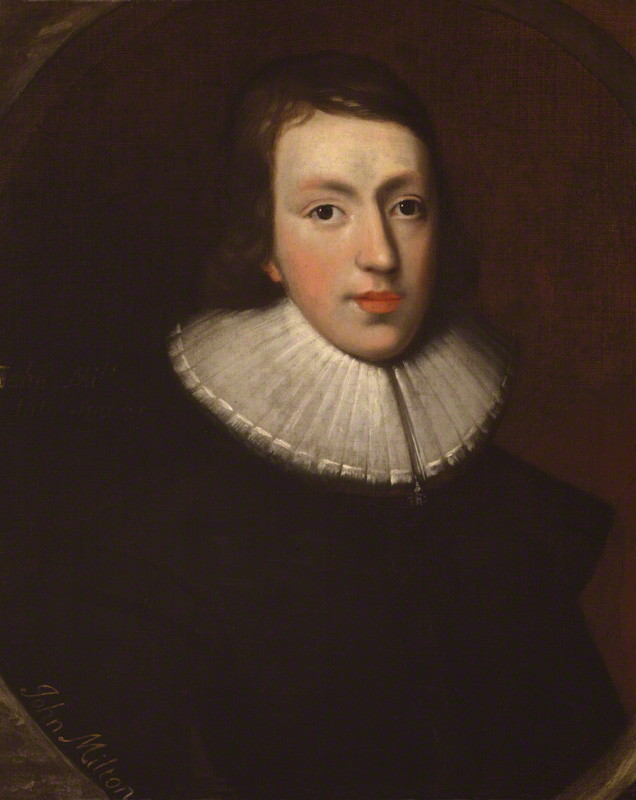
Milton

John Milton (1608–1674), English Protestant poet and essayist, called in the Areopagitica for "the liberty to know, to utter, and to argue freely according to conscience, above all liberties" (applied, however, only to the conflicting Protestant denominations, and not to atheists, Jews, Muslims or even Catholics). "Milton argued for disestablishment as the only effective way of achieving broad toleration. Rather than force a man's conscience, government should recognize the persuasive force of the gospel."

==== Rudolph II ====
In 1609, Rudolph II decreed religious toleration in Bohemia.

==== In the American colonies ====
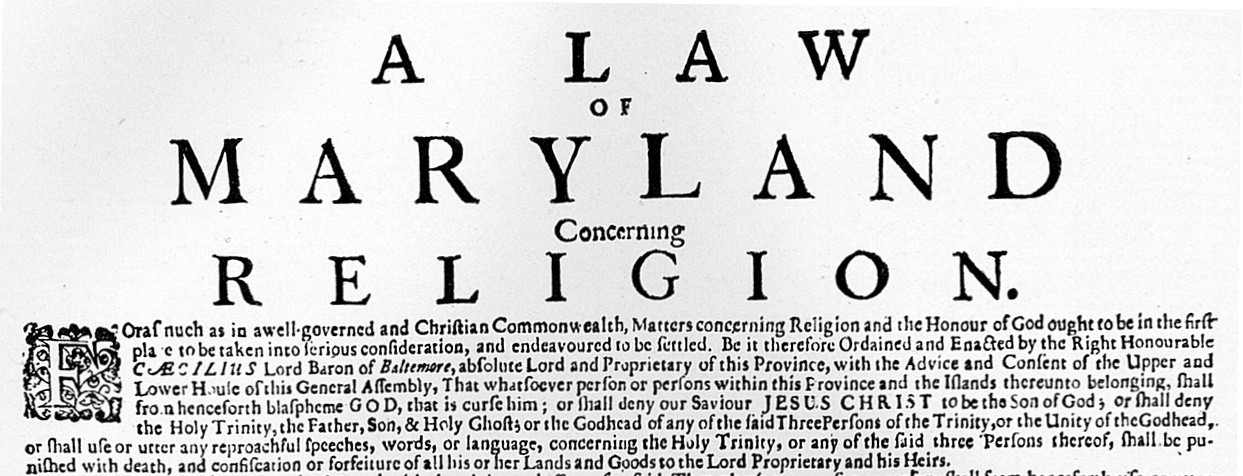
The Maryland Toleration Act, passed in 1649.

In 1636, Roger Williams and companions at the foundation of Rhode Island entered into a compact binding themselves "to be obedient to the majority only in civil things". Williams spoke of "democracie or popular government." Lucian Johnston writes, "Williams' intention was to grant an infinitely greater religious liberty than what existed anywhere in the world outside of the Colony of Maryland." In 1663, Charles II granted the colony a charter guaranteeing complete religious toleration.

Also in 1636, Congregationalist Thomas Hooker and a group of companions founded Connecticut. They combined the democratic form of government that had been developed by the Separatist Congregationalists in Plymouth Colony (Pilgrim Fathers) with unlimited freedom of conscience. Like Martin Luther, Hooker argued that as faith in Jesus Christ was the free gift of the Holy Spirit it could not be forced on a person.

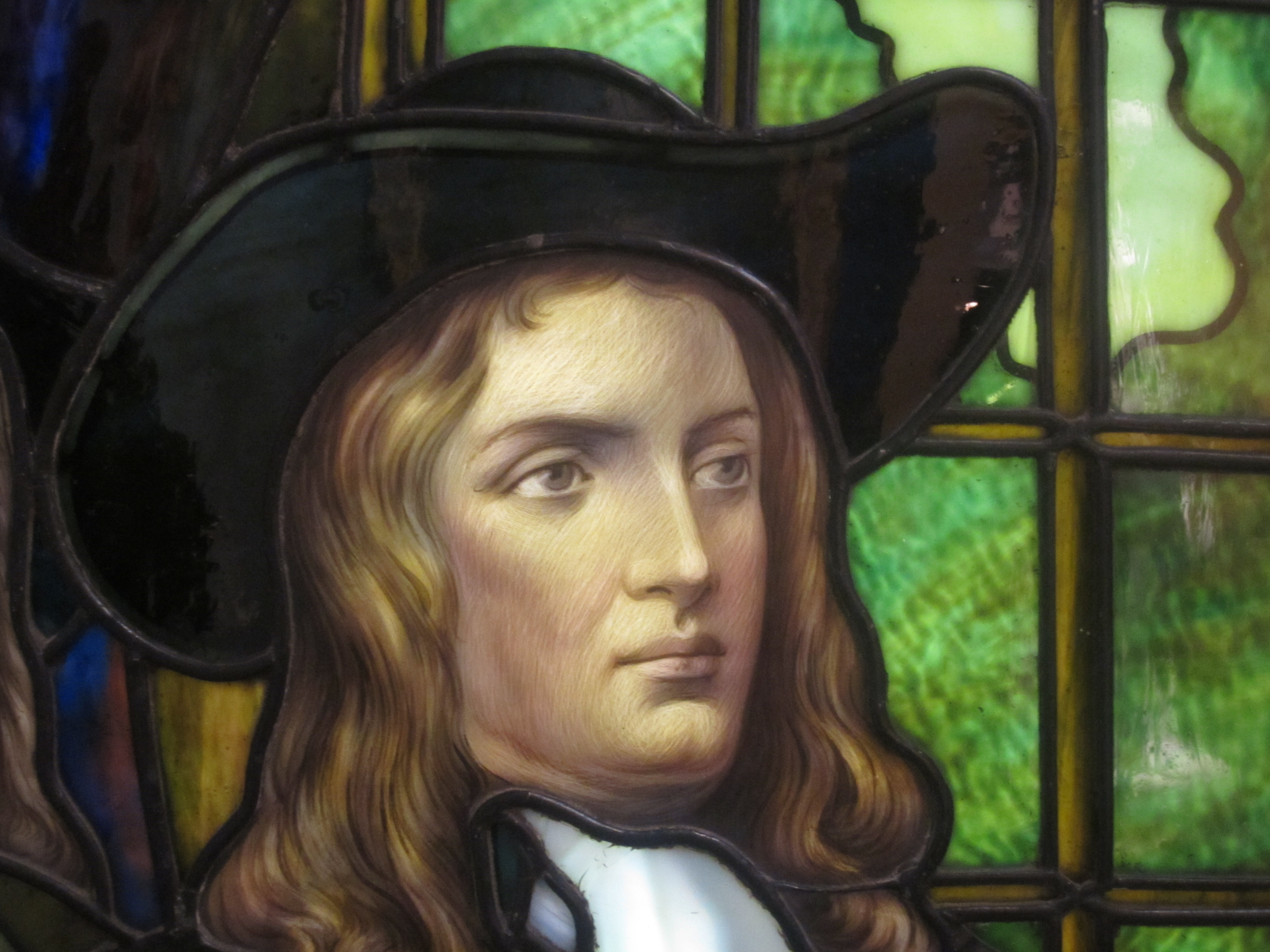
Penn

In 1649 Maryland passed the Maryland Toleration Act, also known as the Act Concerning Religion, a law mandating religious tolerance for Trinitarian Christians only (excluding Nontrinitarian faiths). Passed on September 21, 1649 by the assembly of the Maryland colony, it was the first law requiring religious tolerance in the British North American colonies. The Calvert family sought enactment of the law to protect Catholic settlers and some of the other denominations that did not conform to the dominant Anglicanism of England and her colonies.

In 1657, New Amsterdam, governed by Dutch Calvinists, granted religious toleration to Jews. They had fled from Portuguese persecution in Brazil.

In the Province of Pennsylvania, William Penn and his fellow Quakers heavily imprinted their religious values of toleration on the Pennsylvania government. The Pennsylvania 1701 Charter of Privileges extended religious freedom to all monotheists, and government was open to all Christians.

==== Spinoza ====
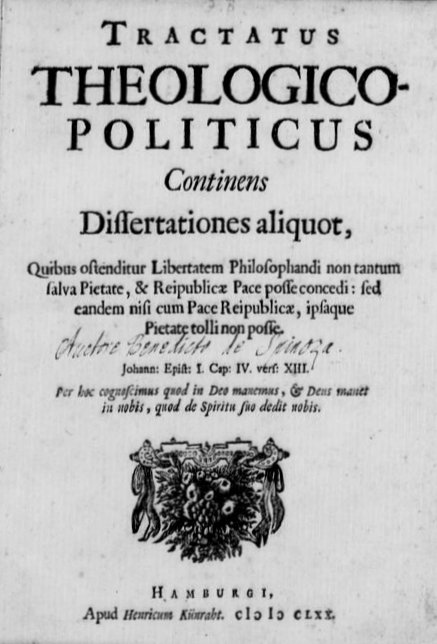
Tractatus Theologico-Politicus of Spinoza

Baruch Spinoza (1632–1677) was a Dutch Jewish philosopher. He published the Theological-Political Treatise anonymously in 1670, arguing (according to the Stanford Encyclopedia of Philosophy) that "the freedom to philosophize can not only be granted without injury to piety and the peace of the Commonwealth, but that the peace of the Commonwealth and Piety are endangered by the suppression of this freedom", and defending, "as a political ideal, the tolerant, secular, and democratic polity". After interpreting certain Biblical texts, Spinoza opted for tolerance and freedom of thought in his conclusion that "every person is in duty bound to adapt these religious dogmas to his own understanding and to interpret them for himself in whatever way makes him feel that he can the more readily accept them with full confidence and conviction."

==== Locke ====
English philosopher John Locke (1632–1704) published A Letter Concerning Toleration in 1689. Locke's work appeared amidst a fear that Catholicism might be taking over England, and responds to the problem of religion and government by proposing religious toleration as the answer. Unlike Thomas Hobbes, who saw uniformity of religion as the key to a well-functioning civil society, Locke argued that more religious groups actually prevent civil unrest. In his opinion, civil unrest results from confrontations caused by any magistrate's attempt to prevent different religions from being practiced, rather than tolerating their proliferation. However, Locke denies religious tolerance for Catholics, for political reasons, and also for atheists because "Promises, covenants, and oaths, which are the bonds of human society, can have no hold upon an atheist". A passage Locke later added to An Essay Concerning Human Understanding questioned whether atheism was necessarily inimical to political obedience.

==== Bayle ====
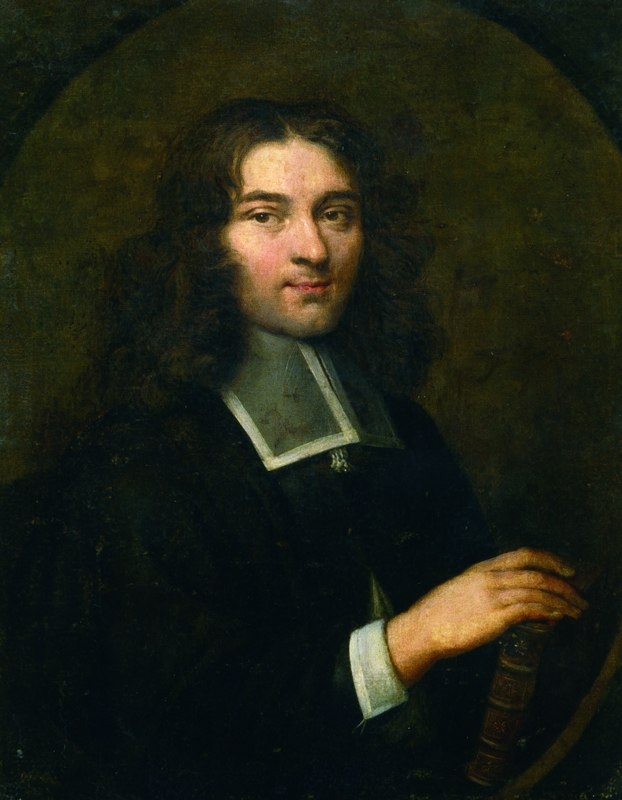
Bayle

Pierre Bayle (1647–1706) was a French Protestant scholar and philosopher who went into exile in Holland. In his "Dictionnaire Historique et Critique" and "Commentaire Philosophique" he advanced arguments for religious toleration (though, like some others of his time, he was not anxious to extend the same protection to Catholics he would to differing Protestant sects). Among his arguments were that every church believes it is the right one so "a heretical church would be in a position to persecute the true church". Bayle wrote that "the erroneous conscience procures for error the same rights and privileges that the orthodox conscience procures for truth."

Bayle was repelled by the use of scripture to justify coercion and violence: "One must transcribe almost the whole New Testament to collect all the Proofs it affords us of that Gentleness and Long-suffering, which constitute the distinguishing and essential Character of the Gospel." He did not regard toleration as a danger to the state, but to the contrary: "If the Multiplicity of Religions prejudices the State, it proceeds from their not bearing with one another but on the contrary endeavoring each to crush and destroy the other by methods of Persecution. In a word, all the Mischief arises not from Toleration, but from the want of it."

==== English Toleration Act 1688 ====
Following the Glorious Revolution, when the Dutch king William came to the English throne, the Toleration Act 1688 adopted by the English Parliament allowed freedom of worship to Nonconformists who had pledged to the oaths of Allegiance and Supremacy and rejected transubstantiation. The Nonconformists were Protestants who dissented from the Church of England such as Baptists and Congregationalists. They were allowed their own places of worship and their own teachers, if they accepted certain oaths of allegiance. The Act, however, did not apply to Catholics and non-trinitarians, and continued the existing social and political disabilities of Dissenters, including their exclusion from political office and from the universities of Oxford and Cambridge.

==== Voltaire ====
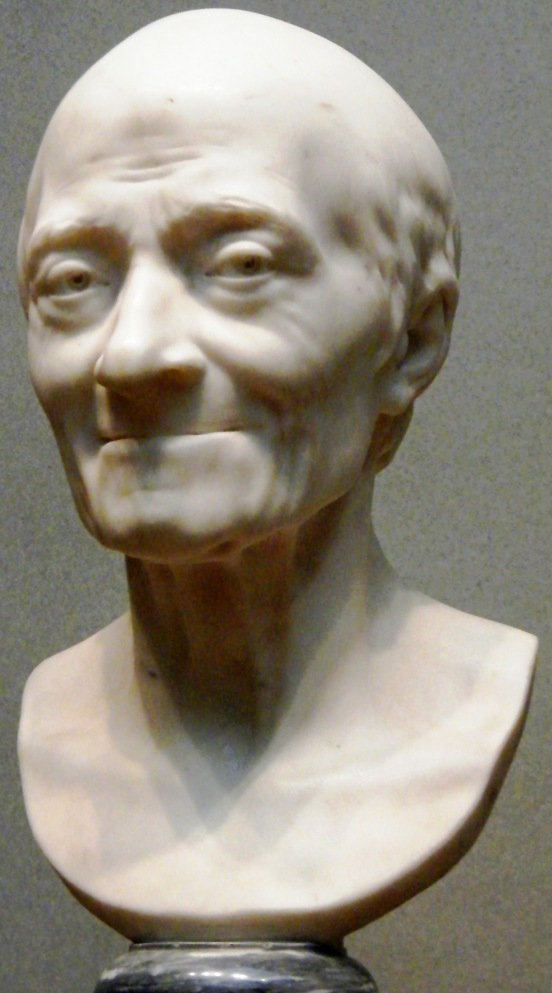
Voltaire

François-Marie Arouet, the French writer, historian and philosopher known as Voltaire (1694–1778) published his Treatise on Toleration in 1763. In it he attacked religious views, but also said, "It does not require great art, or magnificently trained eloquence, to prove that Christians should tolerate each other. I, however, am going further: I say that we should regard all men as our brothers. What? The Turk my brother? The Chinaman my brother? The Jew? The Siam? Yes, without doubt; are we not all children of the same father and creatures of the same God?" On the other hand, Voltaire in his writings on religion was spiteful and intolerant of the practice of the Christian religion, and Orthodox rabbi Joseph Telushkin has claimed that the most significant of Enlightenment hostility against Judaism was found in Voltaire.

==== Lessing ====
Gotthold Ephraim Lessing (1729–1781), German dramatist and philosopher, trusted in a "Christianity of Reason", in which human reason (initiated by criticism and dissent) would develop, even without help by divine revelation. His plays about Jewish characters and themes, such as "Die Juden" and "Nathan der Weise", "have usually been considered impressive pleas for social and religious toleration". The latter work contains the famous parable of the three rings, in which three sons represent the three Abrahamic religions, Christianity, Judaism, and Islam. Each son believes he has the one true ring passed down by their father, but judgment on which is correct is reserved to God.

==== French Declaration of the Rights of Man and of the Citizen ====
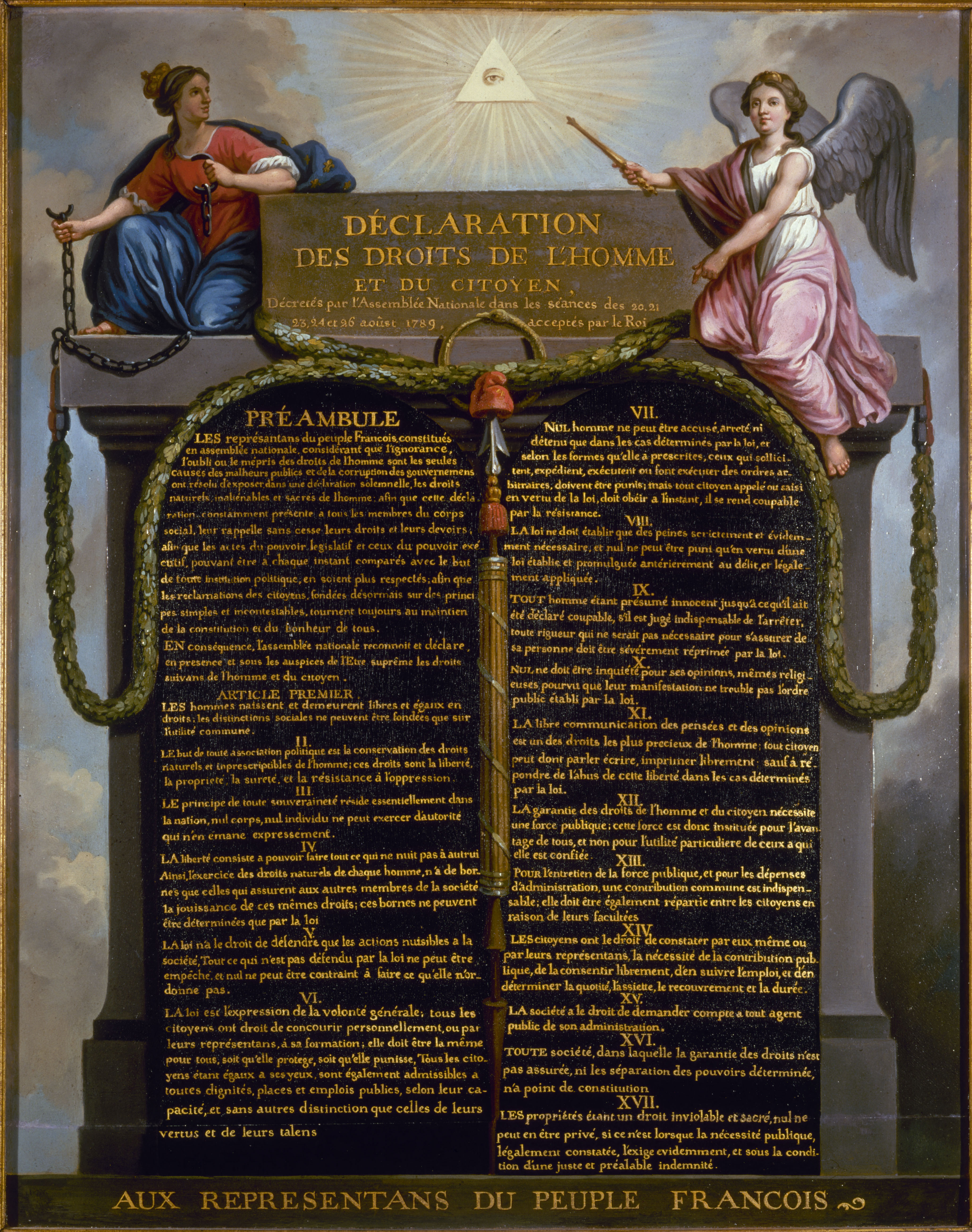
Declaration of the Rights of Man and of the Citizen

The Declaration of the Rights of Man and of the Citizen (1789), adopted by the National Constituent Assembly during the French Revolution, states in Article 10: "No-one shall be interfered with for his opinions, even religious ones, provided that their practice does not disturb public order as established by the law." ("Nul ne doit être inquiété pour ses opinions, mêmes religieuses, pourvu que leur manifestation ne trouble pas l'ordre public établi par la loi.") Napoleon emancipated the Jews in countries his imperial army conquered, expanding the impact of the French Declaration of Rights of Man.

==== The First Amendment to the United States Constitution ====
For having lived long, I have experienced many instances of being obliged, by better information or fuller consideration, to change opinions even on important subjects, which I once thought right, but found to be otherwise. It is therefore that the older I grow the more apt I am to doubt my own judgment, and to pay more respect to the judgment of others.

— Benjamin Franklin

The First Amendment to the United States Constitution, ratified along with the rest of the Bill of Rights on December 15, 1791, included the following words: "Congress shall make no law respecting an establishment of religion, or prohibiting the free exercise thereof..." In 1802, Thomas Jefferson wrote a letter to the Danbury Baptists Association in which he said: "...I contemplate with sovereign reverence that act of the whole American people which declared that their legislature should 'make no law respecting an establishment of religion, or prohibiting the free exercise thereof,' thus building a wall of separation between Church & State."

=== In the nineteenth century ===
The process of legislating religious toleration went unevenly forward, while philosophers continued to discuss the underlying rationale.

==== Roman Catholic Relief Act ====
The Roman Catholic Relief Act 1829 adopted by the Parliament in 1829 repealed the last of the civil restrictions aimed at Catholic citizens of the United Kingdom.

==== Mill ====
John Stuart Mill's arguments in "On Liberty" (1859) in support of the freedom of speech were phrased to include a defense of religious toleration:

Let the opinions impugned be the belief of God and in a future state, or any of the commonly received doctrines of morality... But I must be permitted to observe that it is not the feeling sure of a doctrine (be it what it may) which I call an assumption of infallibility. It is the undertaking to decide that question for others, without allowing them to hear what can be said on the contrary side. And I denounce and reprobate this pretension not the less if it is put forth on the side of my most solemn convictions.

==== Syllabus of Errors ====
The Syllabus of Errors was issued by Pope Pius IX in 1864. It condemns 80 errors or heresies, including the following propositions regarding religious toleration:

77. In the present day it is no longer expedient that the Catholic religion should be held as the only religion of the State, to the exclusion of all other forms of worship. 78. Hence it has been wisely decided by law, in some Catholic countries, that persons coming to reside therein shall enjoy the public exercise of their own peculiar worship. 79. Moreover, it is false that the civil liberty of every form of worship, and the full power, given to all, of overtly and publicly manifesting any opinions whatsoever and thoughts, conduce more easily to corrupt the morals and minds of the people, and to propagate the pest of indifferentism.

==== Renan ====
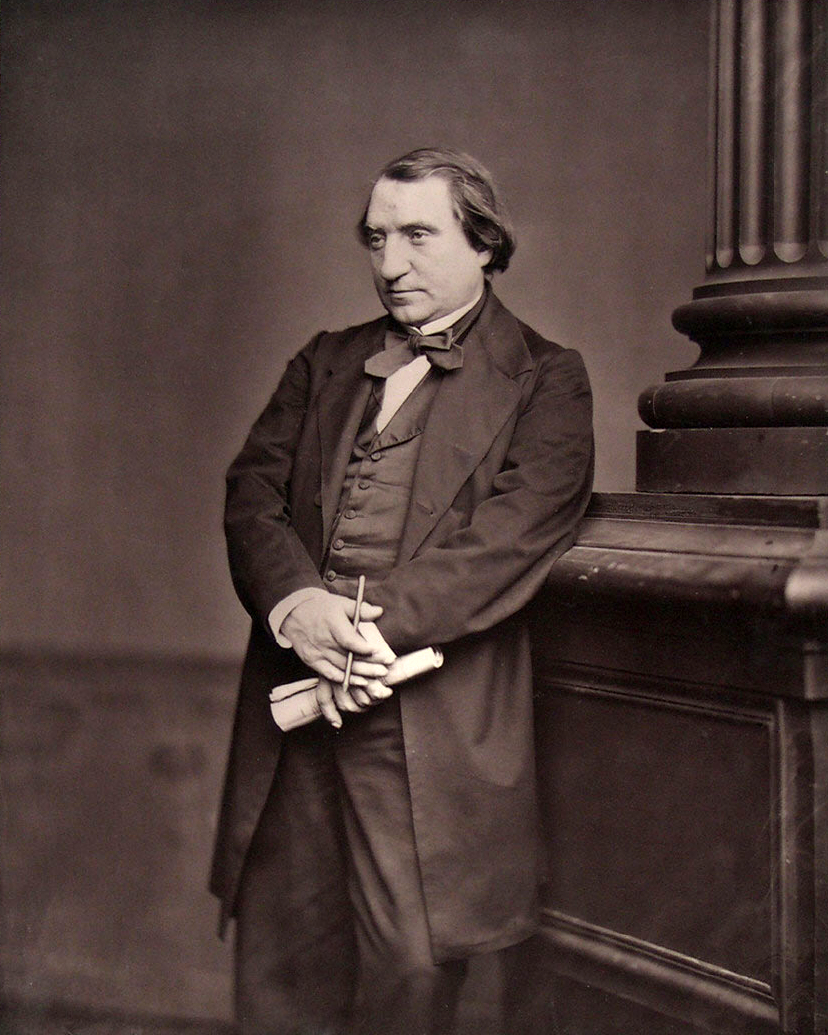
Renan

In his 1882 essay "What is a Nation?", French historian and philosopher Ernest Renan proposed a definition of nationhood based on "a spiritual principle" involving shared memories, rather than a common religious, racial or linguistic heritage. Thus members of any religious group could participate fully in the life of the nation. "You can be French, English, German, yet Catholic, Protestant, Jewish, or practicing no religion".

=== In the twentieth century ===
In 1948, the United Nations General Assembly adopted Article 18 of the Universal Declaration of Human Rights, which states:

Everyone has the right to freedom of thought, conscience and religion; this right includes freedom to change his religion or belief, and freedom, either alone or in community with others and in public or private, to manifest his religion or belief in teaching, practice, worship and observance

Even though not formally legally binding, the Declaration has been adopted in or influenced many national constitutions since 1948. It also serves as the foundation for a growing number of international treaties and national laws and international, regional, national and sub-national institutions protecting and promoting human rights including the freedom of religion.

In 1965, the Catholic Vatican II Council issued the decree Dignitatis humanae (Religious Freedom) that states that all people must have the right to religious freedom. The Catholic 1983 Code of Canon Law states:

Can. 748 §1. All persons are bound to seek the truth in those things which regard God and his Church and by virtue of divine law are bound by the obligation and possess the right of embracing and observing the truth which they have come to know. §2. No one is ever permitted to coerce persons to embrace the Catholic faith against their conscience.

In 1986, the first World Day of Prayer for Peace was held in Assisi. Representatives of one hundred and twenty different religions came together for prayer.

In 1988, in the spirit of Glasnost, Soviet general secretary Mikhail Gorbachev promised increased religious toleration.

==== UN Declaration on Religious Tolerance (1981)—critique ====
The landmark document 'Declaration on the Elimination of All Forms of Intolerance and of Discrimination Based on Religion or Belief,' proclaimed by the United Nations General Assembly on 25 November 1981, has faced substantial criticism for scope, non-effective implementation, and conceptual clarity.

Article 1(1) outlines that "UN declarations are not international treaties; rather, they are statements of agreed standards of action and moral obligation." This non-binding nature means a lack of legal enforceability, and as a result, signatory states are neither under the legal obligations to take concrete actions nor face accountability mechanisms.

Although religious minorities suffer most from such religious discrimination, the UN Declaration notably omits explicit reference to religious minorities. While the needs of religious communities or congregations are contemplated, religious minorities are not recognized.

In article 2 of the Declaration, the definitions of the terms “intolerance and discrimination” appear to be equating with each other. Making a distinction between “intolerance” and “discrimination,” Natan Lerner has underscored the frequent application of the term “discrimination” in international treaties with its definite legal meaning, while the term “intolerance” is marked by impreciseness and ambiguity.

== Hinduism ==
The Rigveda says Ekam Sath Viprah Bahudha Vadanti which translates to "The truth is One, but sages call it by different Names". Consistent with this tradition, India chose to be a secular country even though it was divided by partitioning on religious lines. Whatever intolerance Hindu scholars displayed towards other religions was subtle and symbolic and most likely was done to present a superior argument in defence of their own faith. Traditionally, Hindus showed their intolerance by withdrawing and avoiding contact with those whom they held in contempt, instead of using violence and aggression to strike fear in their hearts. Pluralism and tolerance of diversity are built into Hindu theology. India's long history is a testimony to its tolerance of religious diversity. Christianity came to India with St. Thomas in the first century CE, long before it became popular in the West. Judaism came to India after the Jewish temple was destroyed by the Romans in 70 CE and the Jews were expelled from their homeland. In a recent book titled "Who are the Jews of India?" (University of California Press, 2000), author Nathan Katz observes that India is the only country where the Jews were not persecuted. The Indian chapter is one of the happiest of the Jewish Diaspora. Both Christians and Jews have existed in a predominant Hindu India for centuries without being persecuted. Zoroastrians from Persia (present day Iran) entered India in the 7th century to flee Islamic conquest. They are known as Parsis in India. The Parsis are an affluent community in the city of Mumbai. Once treated as foreigners, they remain a minority community, yet still housing the richest business families in India; for example, the Tata family controls a huge industrial empire in various parts of the country. Mrs. Indira Gandhi, the powerful Prime Minister of India (1966–77; 1980–84), was married to Feroz Gandhi, a Parsi (no relation to Mahatma Gandhi).

== Daoism ==
Daoism is the only indigenous religion rooted in the land of China, and it constitutes a vital component of Chinese civilization. Throughout its development over more than two millennia, Daoism has demonstrated remarkable inclusiveness—embracing not only religious and cultural traditions within the Chinese world but also those originating beyond it. This openness has enabled Daoism to endure through dynastic transitions, foreign invasions, and periods of social upheaval, continually adapting while preserving its core values.

The highest object of Daoist belief is the Dao, which, as “that from which all things arise,” is regarded as the primordial origin, the fundamental force, and the underlying principle that governs the ceaseless transformation and movement of the cosmos. The Dao is understood as the ontological ground of all beings. Accordingly, Daoism venerates the “Great Dao,” a formless, indeterminate source—often described as wu (無), meaning “non-being” or “non-differentiation.” This conception of the Dao as inherently undivided and without fixed characteristics provides a profound philosophical foundation for Daoism’s religious tolerance. Since the Dao encompasses all things without exclusion, Daoist cosmology naturally resists rigid binaries and dogmatic boundaries. In a world rooted in fluid transformation, coexistence is not just ideal—it is ontological.

Doctrinally, Daoism advocates non-contention (wu zheng 無爭) and harmonious coexistence with others. These values are clearly articulated in the Daodejing (《道德经》), particularly in Chapter 16:

“To know eternity is to embrace whatever comes;

To embrace whatever comes is to be just;

To be just is to be complete;

To be complete is to be like Heaven;

To be like Heaven is to return to Tao.”

This passage expresses a cascading ethical progression: when individuals come to understand the eternal and unchanging principles of the universe (chang 常, “constancy”), they develop a heart of tolerance and acceptance (rong 容) toward all things. From this tolerance arises a sense of impartiality and fairness (gong 公). Impartiality fosters completeness and thoroughness (quan 全) in one’s conduct. Acting with such wholeness aligns a person with the natural order (tian 天, “Heaven”). To live in accordance with the principles of Heaven is to be in harmony with the Dao—the Way. And to follow the Dao is to enter a state of lasting stability and peace, where one remains free from harm throughout life. This sequence illustrates a core Daoist vision of tolerance, peace, generativity, and balance—values that support engagement with other religious traditions in a spirit of concord and moderation. Rather than viewing diversity as a threat, Daoism frames it as a reflection of the Dao’s boundless creativity.

Historically, this inclusive and adaptive spirit enabled Daoism to engage in mutual exchange and synthesis with Confucianism and Buddhism. While each tradition retained its distinctive doctrines, they also influenced one another profoundly. One illustrative example is the Daoist adoption of Confucian moral values; the Taishang Ganying Pian (《太上感應篇》), compiled during the Song dynasty, is a seminal text that integrates Daoist metaphysics with Confucian ethics. The work emphasizes virtue, retribution, and moral responsibility, demonstrating how Daoism can incorporate external frameworks while maintaining its spiritual essence.

Through centuries of interaction, the three traditions—Confucianism, Buddhism, and Daoism—gradually converged to form a syncretic paradigm often described as “the unity of the Three Teachings” (san jiao he yi 三教合一). This triadic model became deeply embedded in Chinese culture, shaping rituals, education, governance, and everyday ethics. Rather than competing for dominance, these traditions found ways to coexist, offering the Chinese people a multifaceted yet coherent spiritual worldview. This model of integration rather than exclusion is a testament to the Daoist ethos of accommodation and harmony.

Daoism principles can be helpful in today’s world, marked by religious pluralism, and sometimes tensions between the different religions or cultures. Its values of coexistence, openness to diversity, and refusal to impose doctrinal boundaries offer insights for contemporary discussions about religious tolerance and interfaith dialogue. Daoism emphasizes harmony, and teaches that peace begins with recognizing the interconnectedness of all beings. In this sense, the Dao is not only metaphysical, it also aims at promoting a lived ethic, and teaching individuals and societies to become more inclusive.

== Islam ==
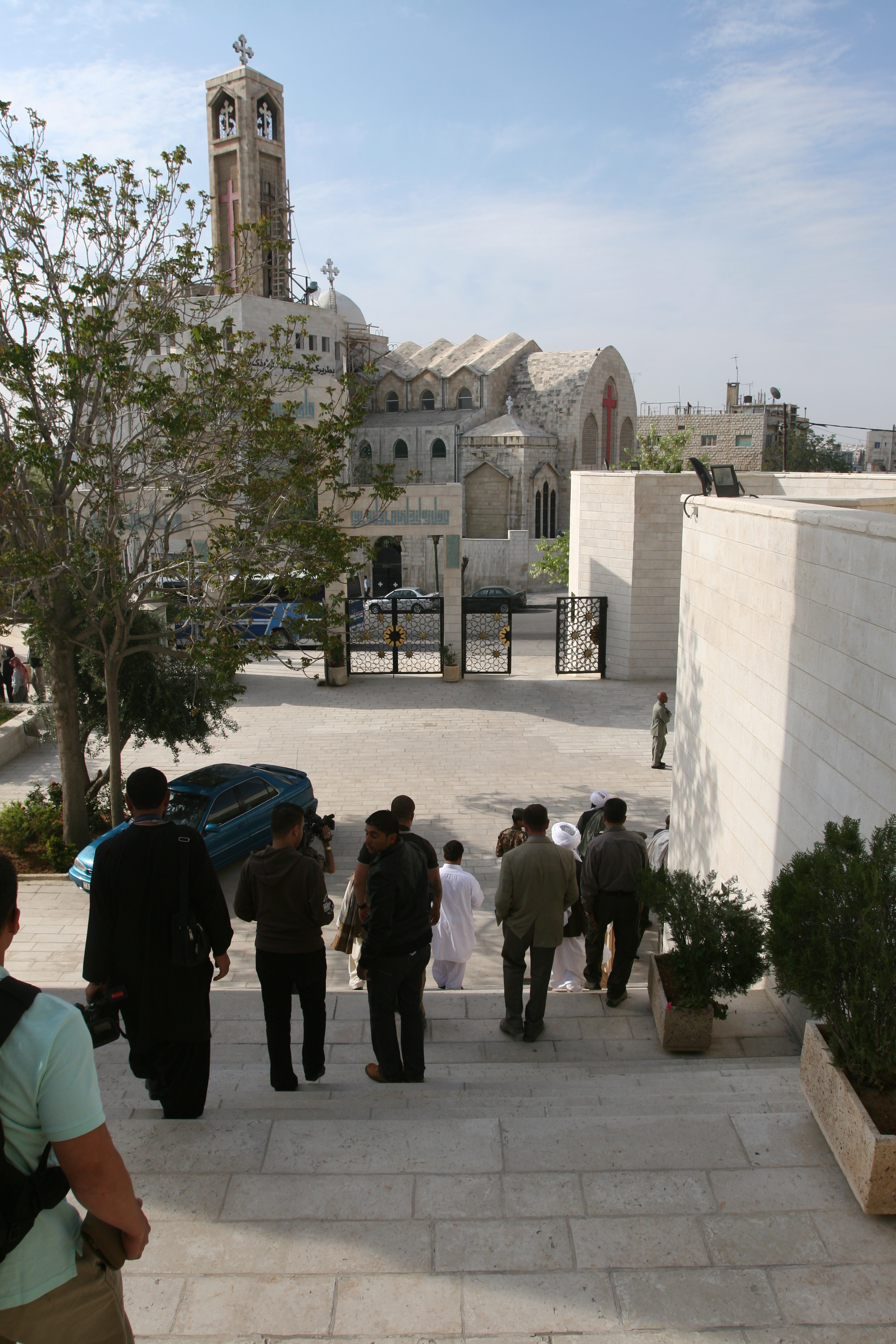
Participants make their way, to the King Abdullah I Mosque in Amman, Jordan from Our Lady Church, to attend the Voices of Religious Tolerance (VORT) conference on April 21, 2011

=== Religious tolerance in Quran ===
Islam is an Abrahamic religion. One of the Quranic verses that deals with religious freedom is, “If your Lord had so wished, everyone on earth would have believed, all of them together! So will you force mankind to become believers?’. The verse advocates for man’s freedom of will. The words of Quran are regarded as the absolute truth, and human beings are called upon to utilize their conscience to recognize this truth, and follow this religion based on their own conviction. The verse also acts as a caution to the believers of Islam against employing any sort of physical, social or financial coercion relating to the matter of faith. Prophet Muhammad was commanded against utilizing any force for submission. He was instructed to, “Invite [people] to your Lord’s way with discretion and kindly instruction, and discuss [things] with them in the politest manner. Your Lord is quite aware as to who has strayed from His path, just as He is quite aware of those who have consented to be guided.” The prescribed method of communication with individuals from other faiths is through a wise dialogue and good advice.

Islam demonstrates a profound tolerance towards the people of the book, encompassing the Abrahamic religions, i.e., Christianity and Judaism. The Quran contains numerous verses that emphasize the status and respect toward the people of the book. The Quran invites Christians and Jews diplomatically and respectfully. However, if they reject the call, the Quran still recognizes them as the people of the book, who are described with good manners and deeds. Similarly, the Quran gives equal status to worship places, for example, monasteries, churches, synagogues, and mosques. Islam further continues in religious tolerance towards Christians and Jews by making family connections with different religious groups. For instance, in the Quran chapter of Maida verse 5 states that Muslim men are allowed to marry the women of the book without putting any condition on their conversion. However, there is a silence in the Quran regarding the marriage of Muslim women to the men of the book.

While Islam has plenty of references regarding the religious tolerance towards Christians and Jews, there is not much reference in the Quran regarding non-Abrahamic religions such as pagans or, for example, Hindus and Buddhists. With a reductionist approach, it can be concluded that Islam does not force anyone to their choice of faith. However, it also discourages Muslims from having strong ties with pagans, such as marriage; Muslims are not allowed to marry pagan men or women.

The Quran, albeit having given importance to its 'true believers', commands its followers to tolerate 'the people of all faiths and communities' and to let them command their dignity, without breaking the Shariah law.

Certain verses of the Quran were interpreted to create a specially tolerated status for People of the Book, Jewish and Christian believers in the Old and New Testaments considered to have been a basis for Islamic religion:

Verily! Those who believe and those who are Jews and Christians, and Sabians, whoever believes in God and the Last Day and do righteous good deeds shall have their reward with their Lord, on them shall be no fear, nor shall they grieve.

Under Islamic law, Jews and Christians were considered dhimmis, a legal status inferior to that of a Muslim but superior to that of other non-Muslims.

Jewish communities in the Ottoman Empire held a protected status and continued to practice their own religion, as did Christians, though both were subject to additional restrictions, such as restrictions on the areas where they could live or work or in clothing, and both had to pay additional taxes. Yitzhak Sarfati, born in Germany, became the Chief Rabbi of Edirne and wrote a letter inviting European Jews to settle in the Ottoman Empire, in which he asked: "Is it not better for you to live under Muslims than under Christians?'". Sultan Beyazid II (1481–1512), issued a formal invitation to the Jews expelled from Catholic Spain and Portugal, leading to a wave of Jewish immigration.

According to Michael Walzer:

The established religion of the [Ottoman] empire was Islam, but three other religious communities—Greek Orthodox, Armenian Orthodox, and Jewish—were permitted to form autonomous organizations. These three were equal among themselves, without regard to their relative numerical strength. They were subject to the same restrictions vis-à-vis Muslims—with regard to dress, proselytizing, and intermarriage, for example—and were allowed the same legal control over their own members.

=== Prohibition on access to holy places ===
According to the interpretation of the Quran, non-Muslims should not access the holiest places, namely Mecca and Medina mosques. Since the 9th year of Prophet Muhammad’s migration, the Pagans were not allowed to perform pilgrimage around Kaߵba. Moreover, they were not allowed to occupy the mosques and the worshiping places of the Muslims. In chapter, The Repentance al-Tawba, Allah says to Muhammad, “O believers! Indeed, the polytheists are ˹spiritually˺ impure, so they should not approach the Sacred Mosque after this year.”

Based on the interpretation of Abu Hayyan al-Andalusi, “polytheists” are the unbelievers, which does not include the people of the book, i.e., Christians and Jews, who are monotheists. Abu Hayyan’s exegesis aligns with the Jurisprudence of Abu Hanifa, the founder of one of the four Islamic Law schools, allowing Christians and Jews to access mosques. The scholars also emphasized that the “impurity” that is mentioned in the Quran is meant in an allegorical way. Those who are spiritually impure should not enter the Sacred places. They support their argument that the people of the book cannot be considered impure by the Quran because elsewhere in the book, the believers are allowed to eat food of the people of the book, as it is halal (religiously permissible).

However, the Maliki school used analogy qiyas to conclude that every non-Muslim, including the People of the Book, are unbeliever and, therefore, should not access the sacred places. They also made an analogy between the Holy Mosque and all other mosques. Based on this interpretation, many modern Muslims believe that they can pray anywhere as long as they face Mecca and the place is pure.

=== Religious tolerance in Medieval Iberia ===
In Al-Andalus (Andalusia), from the 8th to the 15th centuries, under Muslim rule, a degree of religious tolerance was granted to Christians and Jews. This part of history is known for its supposed religious tolerance, especially under the Umayyad Caliphate where many cultural and intellectual achievements were made. Under this Islamic rule, non-Muslims were known as ‘dhimmi’ and Christians and Jews were granted certain protections whilst given the right to practice their faith in exchange for a tax, called jizya. However, the People of the Book are treated as second class citizens

The term Convivencia (co-existence) was coined by Americo Castro in the 1940s, to describe how the three religions lived together peacefully during this time. However, many scholars point out the oversimplification of this phenomenon. On one hand, there is the belief of the medieval Iberian Peninsula as a cross- cultural, peaceful era and on the other, it has been characterized as a place of conflict, not cooperation.

As a pact of protection and submission, the dhimmi originally only protected the People of the Book, but as Islam expanded also other religions were included. In Al-Andalus the specific written regulation in use was the Pact of Umar, which defined a paradox in the treatment of the dhimmis which were considered both inferior and an integral part of the Umma at the same time: on the one hand they were granted religious freedom, protection, civil rights and exclusion from the military service and, on the other, they were forced to pay a tax, excluded from public offices and treated with inferiority and some discriminatory attitudes. However, there was a discrepancy between the written prescriptions and the reality of their application. This is evident especially regarding the Jewish community during the period of the Umayyad caliphate and the taifas, when Jews were occupying important roles as physicians, bureaucrats and even high-ranking administrators (as the cases of Hasdai ibn Shaprūt and Samuel ibn Nagrela show). The coexistence of the time cannot be defined as cultural mixing or inter-culturalism, despite the presence of mixed marriages; however, while there was disdain for the dhimmis and their inferiority status, this rarely resulted in racial or ethnic violence, fostering mostly peaceful coexistence.

Interfaith marriages in medieval Al-Andalus, frequently between Muslim men and Christian or Jewish women, allow an interesting perspective on the practice of religious tolerance. Intermarriage between Muslims and Christians in the Iberian Peninsula seems to have taken root shortly after the Islamic conquest of the region in 711. Inter-religious marriages were legally permissible within specific parameters outlined by Islamic law. Muslim men were allowed to marry Christian or Jewish women, known as dhimmis. In contrast muslim women were prohibited from marrying outside of Islam.

Interfaith marriages in medieval Iberia had mutually beneficial aspects for both the dominant Muslim authorities and the minority religious communities. On the one hand, in early Muslim Iberia, such unions served to legitimize Muslim authority by connecting the new rulers to the local Visigothic nobility and allowing land acquisition through inheritance. On the other hand, marriages between Christian women and Muslim converts were seen as a possibility to maintain Christian communal cohesion while simultaneously facilitating the social advancement of male converts.

The perception of these unions however varied: Interfaith unions were commonly regarded by the dominant groups as legitimate alliances, while the perception of such unions by subordinated communities was often one of coercion or exploitation. Even the recipient group of the bride could view such unions with suspicion, fearing a loss of status or internal cohesion through the integration of outsiders.

Over time inter-religious marriages evolved into a habitus, an embedded social practice of interfaith coexistence and secret religious duality, notably among Crypto-Christians and Crypto-Muslims. As such, interfaith marriage in al-Andalus reveals the complex, lived dimensions of tolerance beyond official doctrine.

Jewish communities in Al-Andalus under Muslim rule experienced both opportunity and constraint. Unlike other communities in Europe they had a legal status as dhimmis. While this period is referred to as Convivencia, it had limitations. The Jewish community sometimes faced violence, such as the 1066 Granada massacre. In the 12th century, the Almohad dynasty imposed forced conversions and expulsions. Maimonides, for example, wrote in his Epistle to Yemen that the Muslims had “oppressed, humiliated and hated us”.

In the 19th century, scholars of the Wissenschaft des Judentums (Science of Judaism) movement, such as Leopold Zunz and Heinrich Graetz, highlighted this period as a “Golden Age” of Jewish life. Graetz portrayed Al-Andalus as a place where Jews “contributed to the greatness of the country” and wrote “joyous, gay poetry”. These idealized images were motivated by the idea of Jewish emancipation in Europe. However, modern historians now view this narrative as overly romanticized and they point out that Jews remained second-class citizens under Islamic law and suffered recurring episodes of discrimination.

A clear gap is discussed between the ideal and the actual in the story of the Moriscos of Spain, showing that religious tolerance in Iberia was fragile and conditional depending on the ruler and the dynasty.

The Moriscos expulsion came after more than a century of conflict and mutual mistrust that followed the 1492 Christian conquest and the forced conversion or expulsion of Muslims in 1502 and 1526. Moriscos were suspected of secretly practicing Islam of following Arabic customs and traditions, and of resisting acculturation. They were believed by authorities and ecclesiastics to be a danger to both Catholic unity and national security. One of the main reasons for the expulsion was the uprising of the Morisco population in Alpujarras that the Spanish feared could soon be supported by the Ottomans. This process started in eastern Spain in 1609 and was extended to Andalusia in 1610. Morisco families were transported to ports and shipped mainly to North Africa and Ottoman lands. The expulsion depopulated entire villages, derailed local economies (especially agriculture), and marked the end of centuries of Muslim cultural contribution in southern Spain.

== Judaism ==
Jews have been among the most persecuted group in the world and have faced waves of discrimination as early as 605 BCE, when Jews who lived in the Neo-Babylonian Empire were persecuted and deported. During the Spanish Inquisition, royal decrees to force the conversion to Christianity led to mass expulsion of Jews from Spain. A major target of the Portuguese Inquisition were the conversos, Jews who converted to Christianity and were accused of practicing Crypto-Judaism.

Jews have also been used as scapegoats for tragedies and shortcomings, such as those seen in the Black Death Persecutions, the 1066 Granada Massacre, Expulsions from Europe and the Middle East, the Massacre of 1391 in Spain, the many Pogroms in the Russian Empire, and the tenets of Nazism prior to and during World War II, which lead to the Holocaust and the murder of six million Jews. In the post-war era, Jews were the subject of purges in the Soviet Union under Joseph Stalin, beginning in 1948. Stalin had plans to deport the entire Jewish population in the Soviet Union to Siberia.

== Modern analyses and critiques ==
Contemporary commentators have highlighted situations in which toleration conflicts with widely held moral standards, national law, the principles of national identity, or other strongly held goals. Michael Walzer notes that the British in India tolerated the Hindu practice of suttee (ritual burning of a widow) until 1829. On the other hand, the United States declined to tolerate the Mormon practice of polygamy. The French head scarf controversy represents a conflict between religious practice and the French secular ideal. Toleration of the Romani people in European countries is a continuing issue.

=== Modern definition ===
Historian Alexandra Walsham notes that the modern understanding of the word toleration may be very different from its historic meaning. Toleration in modern parlance has been analyzed as a component of a liberal or libertarian view of human rights. Hans Oberdiek writes, "As long as no one is harmed or no one's fundamental rights are violated, the state should keep hands off, tolerating what those controlling the state find disgusting, deplorable or even debased. This for a long time has been the most prevalent defense of toleration by liberals... It is found, for example, in the writings of American philosophers John Rawls, Robert Nozick, Ronald Dworkin, Brian Barry, and a Canadian, Will Kymlicka, among others."

Isaiah Berlin attributes to Herbert Butterfield the notion that "toleration... implies a certain disrespect. I tolerate your absurd beliefs and your foolish acts, though I know them to be absurd and foolish. Mill would, I think, have agreed."

John Gray states that "When we tolerate a practice, a belief or a character trait, we let something be that we judge to be undesirable, false or at least inferior; our toleration expresses the conviction that, despite its badness, the object of toleration should be left alone." However, according to Gray, "new liberalism—the liberalism of Rawls, Dworkin, Ackerman and suchlike" seems to imply that "it is wrong for government to discriminate in favour of, or against, any form of life animated by a definite conception of the good."

=== Tolerating the intolerant ===
Walzer, Karl Popper and John Rawls have discussed the paradox of tolerating intolerance. Walzer asks "Should we tolerate the intolerant?" He notes that most minority religious groups who are the beneficiaries of tolerance are themselves intolerant, at least in some respects. Rawls argues that an intolerant sect should be tolerated in a tolerant society unless the sect directly threatens the security of other members of the society. He links this principle to the stability of a tolerant society, in which members of an intolerant sect in a tolerant society will, over time, acquire the tolerance of the wider society.

=== Other criticisms and issues ===
Toleration has been described as undermining itself via moral relativism: "either the claim self-referentially undermines itself or it provides us with no compelling reason to believe it. If we are skeptical about knowledge, then we have no way of knowing that toleration is good."

Ronald Dworkin argues that in exchange for toleration, minorities must bear with the criticisms and insults which are part of the freedom of speech in an otherwise tolerant society. Dworkin has also questioned whether the United States is a "tolerant secular" nation, or is re-characterizing itself as a "tolerant religious" nation, based on the increasing re-introduction of religious themes into conservative politics. Dworkin concludes that "the tolerant secular model is preferable, although he invited people to use the concept of personal responsibility to argue in favor of the tolerant religious model."

In The End of Faith, Sam Harris asserts that society should be unwilling to tolerate unjustified religious beliefs about morality, spirituality, politics, and the origin of humanity, especially beliefs which promote violence.

== See also ==
- Anekantavada
- A Critique of Pure Tolerance
- Freedom From Religion Foundation
- Freedom of religion
- Freedom of religion by country
- History of Christian thought on persecution and tolerance
- Inclusivism
- Christianity and other religions
- Islam and other religions
- International Day of Human Fraternity
- Multifaith space
- Ontario Consultants on Religious Tolerance
- Religious discrimination
- Religious intolerance
- Religious persecution
- Religious pluralism
- Secular state
- Separation of church and state

== Sources ==
This article incorporates text from a free content work. Licensed under CC-BY-SA IGO 3.0 (license statement/permission). Text taken from Rethinking Education: Towards a global common good?, 24, UNESCO.
