= Old cemetery, Roermond =

Burial monument in Roermond, Netherlands

- Oude Kerhof
- Old cemetery, Roermond (2019)
- Interactive map of Old cemetery, Roermond
- Coordinates: 51°10′53″N 5°59′59″E
- Type: Funerary monument
- Completion date: c. 1888
- Restored date: 1972

The Old cemetery, Roermond, (Dutch: Oude Kerkhof, lit. 'Old cemetery') known locally in the Limburgish dialect as Den Aje Kirkhaof, is a historic Roman Catholic cemetery located along Kapellerlaan, Roermond. Its official administrative name is De Begraafplaats Nabij de Kapel in 't Zand due to its proximity to the adjacent pilgrimage chapel. It was originally a Jewish cemetery. The history of the Christian part of the cemetery begins in the year 1785.

The entire site was designed by the renowned Dutch architect Pierre Cuypers, who drew inspiration from the cemetery of Robermont in Liège. Cuypers also designed the cemetery's bishop's chapel, where his remains temporarily rested during the restoration of his family grave monument in 2006. Encompassing a rich variety of historic grave types, 47 burial vaults, and a unique local ecosystem of specialized flora and fauna, the grounds hold protected monument status alongside its surrounding walls and individual grave markers.

== History ==
Outside the walls of Roermond, a Jewish cemetery already existed. According to Jewish law, a cemetery, although consecrated, is ritually impure. Within the walls of the city, there can be no place for anything that is impure. This is the reason why Jewish cemeteries are often located some distance outside the built-up area. The history of the Christian part of the cemetery begins in the year 1785. In that year, by edict of Emperor Joseph II in the Southern Netherlands, to which Roermond then belonged, it was forbidden to continue burying people within the city walls. Next to the Jewish cemetery, a location was found to comply with this new regulation. Burials took place at the Cemetery Near the Chapel in 't Zand until 1948. In 2010, the cemetery was reopened for new burials.

== Mortuary ==
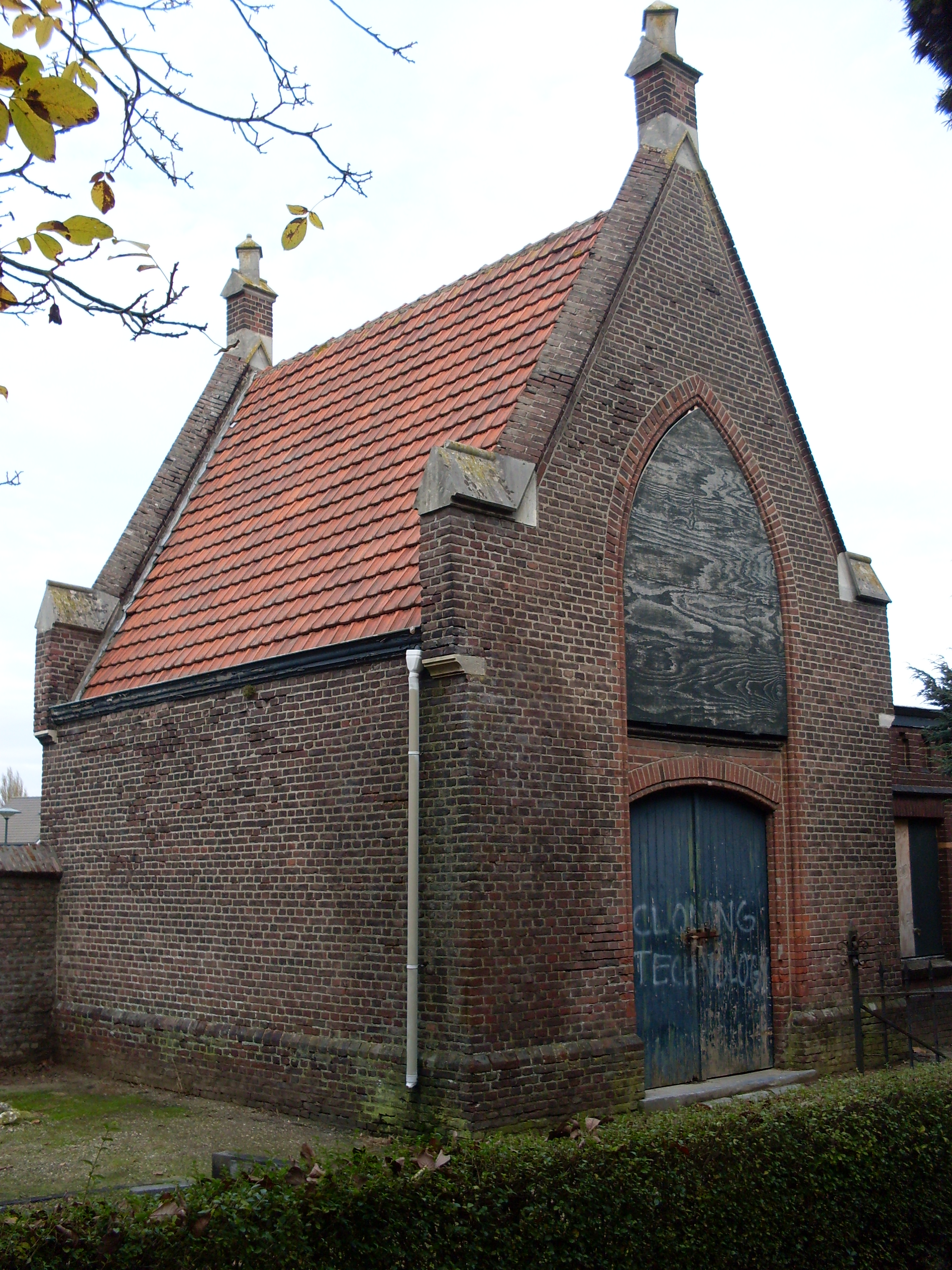
The mortuary before the renovation

The mortuary is located at the back of the grounds, near the new Jewish section and the Lost Cemetery. Here, the bodies of those awaiting burial were kept and dissections were also performed. It was completely restored in 2012. It can be viewed during guided tours.

The mortuary dating from 1882 and designed by the architect Pierre Cuypers, were thoroughly restored in 2012. The former mortuary in particular underwent extensive renovation. While prior to 1997 it served as a storage facility and a location where autopsies were also performed by a pathologist, in 2019 it functions as a museum space and a venue for presentations.

== Layout ==
The cemetery features five distinct sections:

- The Catholic section
- The Dutch-reformed section
- The old Jewish quarter
- The new Jewish part
- The Lost Cemetery

This classification according to personal conviction has not been strictly adhered to for the military graves.

=== Catholic section ===
The Catholic section is by far the largest. The graves are arranged in classes. The first class contains graves with perpetual burial rights. They are located along the wide path in the middle. Further to the left and right are graves of the second and third classes. Far on the outside, along the walls, are the graves of the fourth class. The first class was affordable for the elite. Large grave monuments, statues of saints, and burial vaults of prominent individuals are located here. Fourth-class graves were for the poor who were buried at the municipality's expense.

=== Protestant section ===
The Dutch Reformed section is the second largest and is located on the left side of the cemetery. Here too, there are many old and striking graves and burial vaults.

=== Old jewish section ===
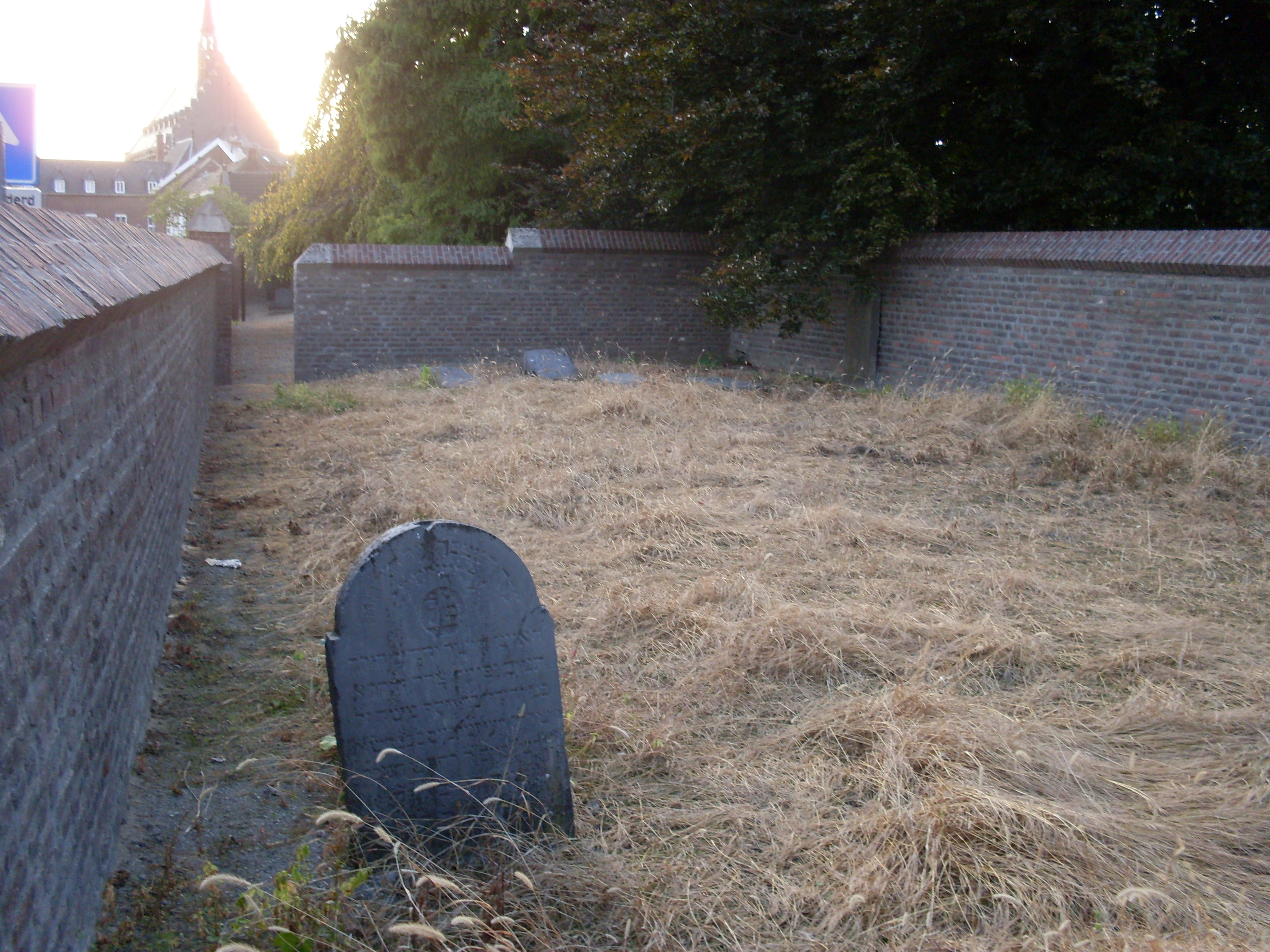
The Old Jewish Cemetery, the oldest part of Cemetery Near the Chapel in 't Zand

This is the oldest part, existing already before 1785. It is enclosed between walls and can be reached via a small passageway in the Protestant section. As of 2008, six gravestones are still visible, four of which have fallen over. When entering this part of the cemetery, one notices that the ground rises considerably. It is likely that burials here took place in two layers. Jewish graves are always perpetual: as a matter of principle, Jewish graves are not cleared, because the dead await the Day of Judgment in their graves. Remains can only be reburied under rabbinical supervision. If this was not possible or if the cemetery became full at some point, an area was raised to enable a second layer of graves to be laid out. The exact number of people buried here is unknown, likely several hundred.

The six gravestones all feature complete Hebrew inscriptions with dates of death around 1850. There is also believed to have been a Jewish cemetery on Weerterweg in Linne.

=== New jewish section ===
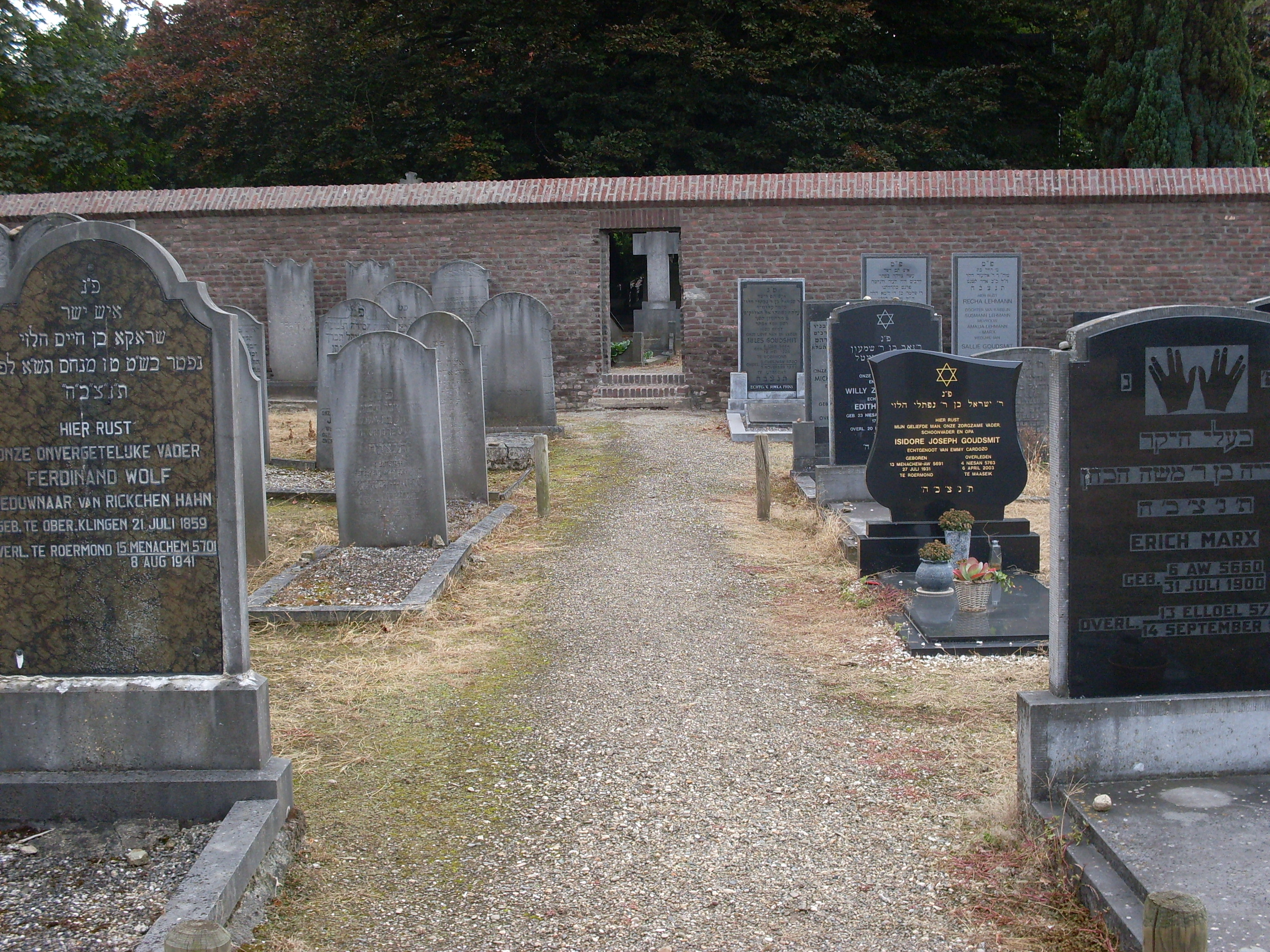
The new Jewish cemetery

The new Jewish section is located at the very back of the cemetery and is accessible via a small passageway in the wall shared with the Catholic section. There is a separate entrance gate for funeral processions, allowing visitors to enter the Jewish cemetery directly from the street. This section of the cemetery is still in use. There are about 100 graves.

=== Lost cemetery ===
This small section is located at the very back and is not enclosed by separate walls. It is the resting place for individuals who did not belong to a church, committed suicide, or were found as unknown bodies in the Meuse. Near the Lost Cemetery is a hedge beneath which unbaptized children were buried. According to the ecclesiastical laws of that time, they were actually supposed to be buried behind the hedge, in unconsecrated ground. To avoid increasing the parents' grief even further, a choice was made to bury them beneath the hedge that marked the boundary.

== Notable grave ==
=== Bishop's Chapel ===
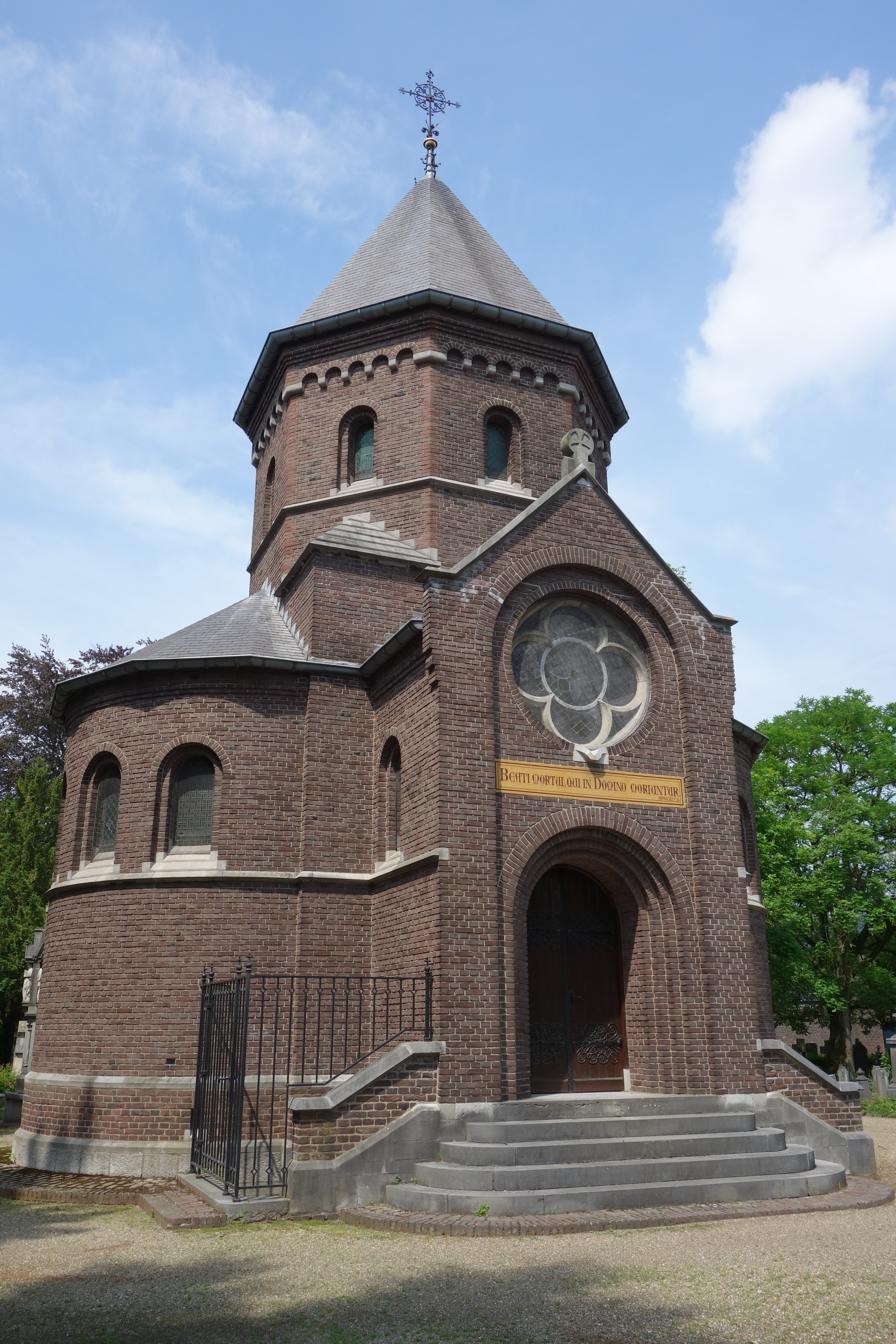
The Bishop's Chapel

The Episcopal Burial Chapel, better known as the Bishop's Chapel (1887), was designed by Pierre Cuypers. In this chapel, nearly all deceased bishops of Roermond from after 1853 (Restoration of the Episcopal Hierarchy) are interred in a crypt. The chapel was listed as a national monument in the Monuments Register in 1976.

The chapel is centrally located in the cemetery, at the intersection of the main avenue and two side lanes. Cuypers' grave is located to the left behind the chapel. Cuypers also designed two other burial chapels in the cemetery, those of the Bongaerts family and the Stoltzenberg family. Joannes Paredis (1795-1886), who became the first bishop of the restored Diocese of Roermond after the restoration of the episcopal hierarchy (1853), was the first to be interred there. At the end of 1887, the burial chapel was consecrated by Bishop Franciscus Boermans.

=== Grave with the Hands ===
Grave with the Hands is a pair of tombstones for Protestant cavalry colonel J.W.C. van Gorkum (1809–1880) and his Catholic wife, noblewoman J.C.P.H. van Aefferden (1820–1888). In 1842, their mixed marriage caused a major shock in the Catholic south of the country. Following the cemetery's strict denominational segregation enforced by dividing walls, the couple could not be buried together when the colonel died in 1880. To circumvent this restriction, he was buried in the Protestant section directly against the dividing wall, and when van Aefferden died eight years later, she was buried on the opposite side in the Catholic section.

Rising above the wall, their grave monuments are physically linked by a man's hand and a woman's hand firmly clasping one another. The surrounding railings reflect their distinct backgrounds: Colonel van Gorkum's plot features a sleek, rectangular railing with sharp points reminiscent of a bayonet, while Jonkvrouwe van Aefferden's railing is rounded and finished with soft points shaped like a cross fleury.

On the new Jewish cemetery, a gravestone features two hands clasping one another, marking the resting place of Isaac Beretz and Henriëtte Marx. The porcelain ornament with the intertwined hands on this grave has unfortunately been vandalized.

=== Icebox ===
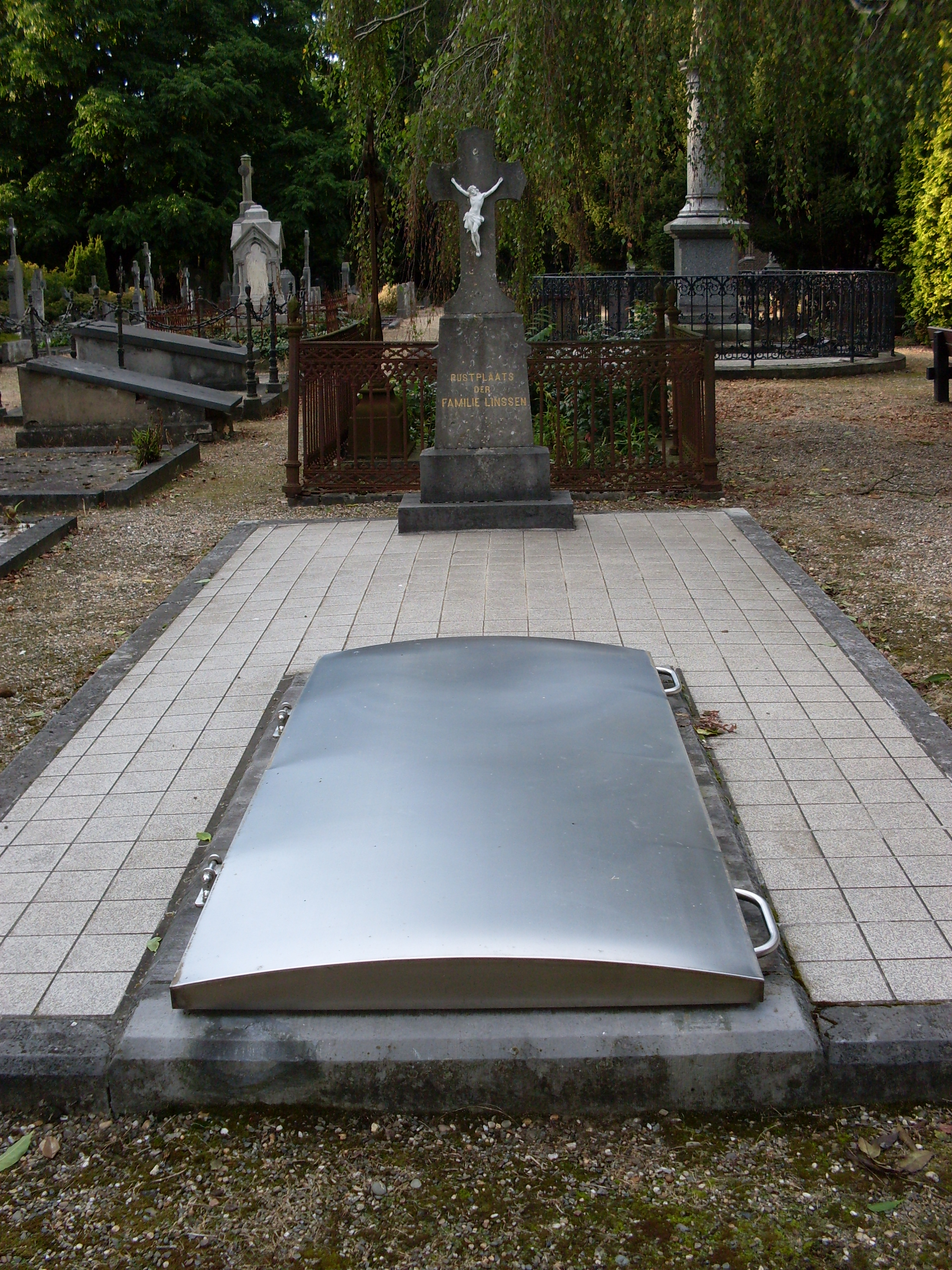
The 'Icebox'

Icebox refers to the burial vault of the Linssen notary family from Roermond. The entrance to the burial vault is covered by a stainless steel door, which with some imagination can be associated with an American refrigerator.

=== Zouave ===
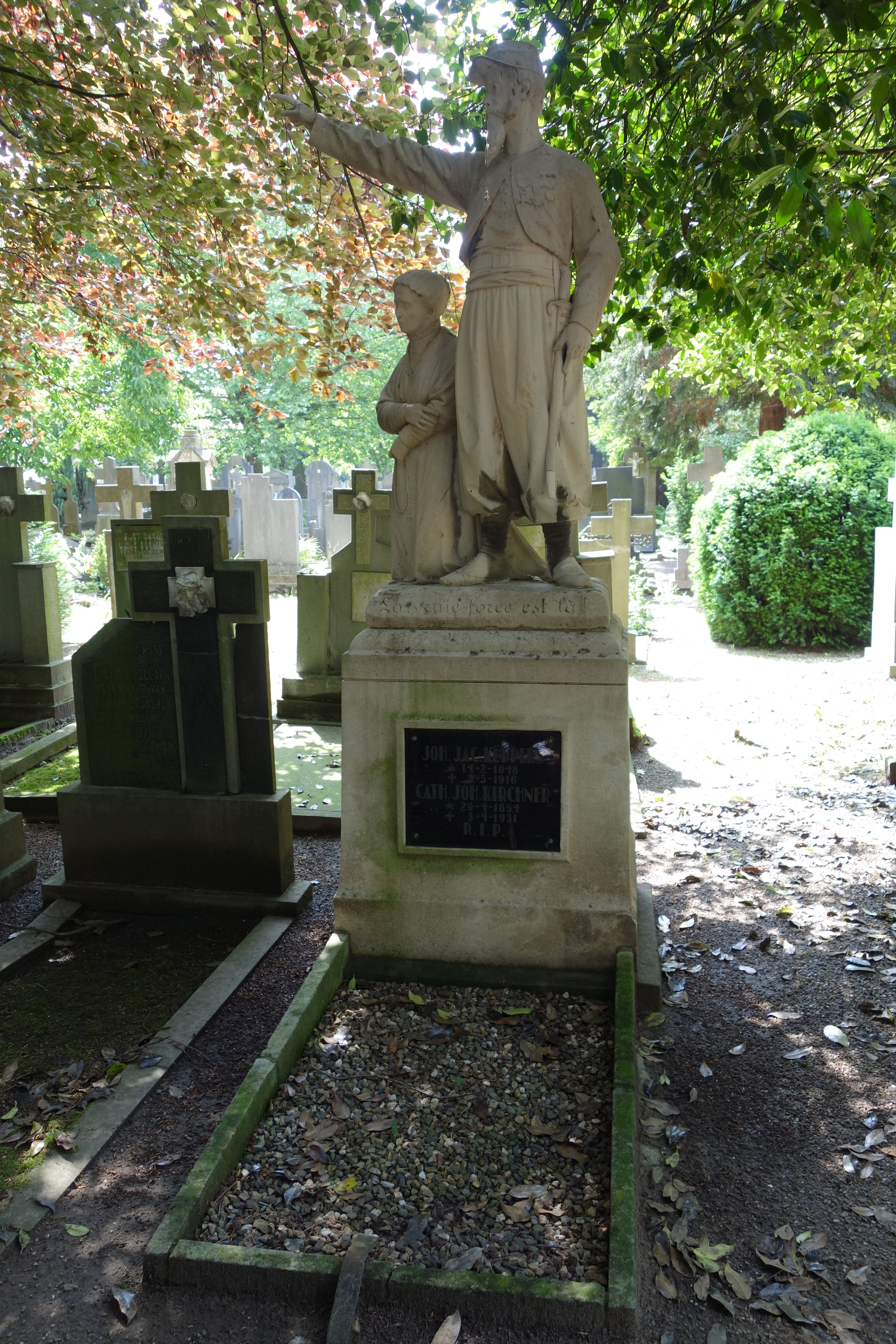
The Zouave

Roermond Zouave Joh. Jac. Küpper (14-02-1848 - 04-05-1916) is buried in the Catholic section alongside his wife Cath. Joh. Kirchner (29-04-1854 - 03-04-1931). The Zouave points his hand toward Rome, while his wife sits kneeling and praying with closed eyes at his right side, holding a rosary in her left hand.

=== Military graves ===
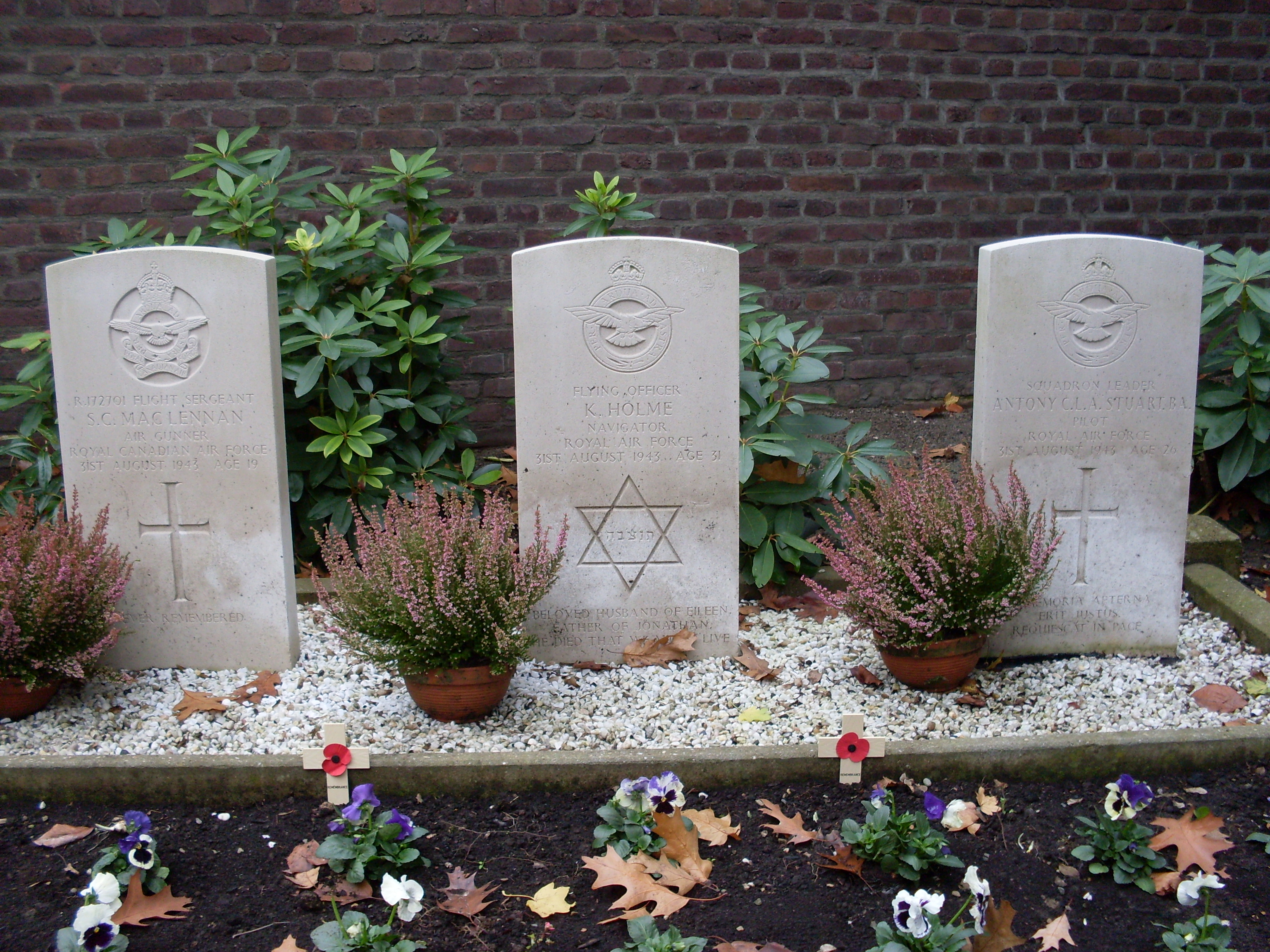
Military grave

There are also a number of war graves located in the Catholic section. Remarkable is the presence of a Jewish grave. Flying Officer K. Holme (navigator of the Royal Air Force), who died on 31-08-1943 at the age of 31, rests here beside his Christian comrades. On military cemeteries no distinction is made according to religion, which is why eight servicemen of different faiths are buried together here.

=== NSB grave ===
The grave of Leendert Willem de Leeuw (Raamsdonk 27-11-1890 - Roermond 24-01-1943) is located in the Verloren kerkhof (Lost Cemetery). De Leeuw was a member of the NSB or National Socialist Movement. Graves of this type are rare; only about fifty are known in existence in the Netherlands. Many NSB members were buried anonymously or had their grave monuments destroyed.

== See also ==
- Pillarization
