= Grave with the Hands =

Burial monument in Roermond, Netherlands

- Graf met de handjes
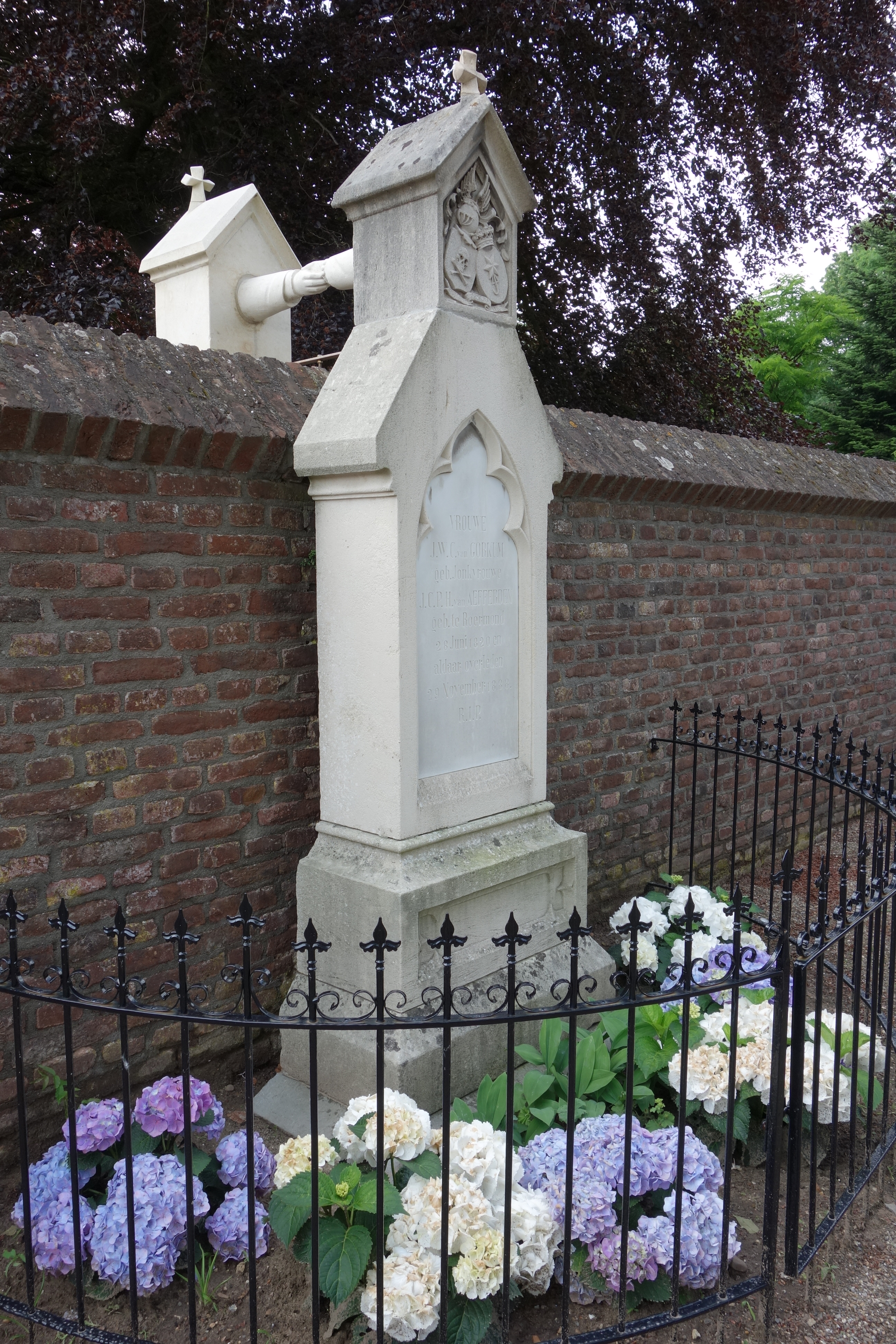
- The monument in 2016
- Interactive map of Grave with the Hands
- Location: Begraafplaats Nabij Kapel in 't Zand, Roermond, Netherlands
- Coordinates: 51°10′52″N 6°00′01″E
- Type: Funerary monument
- Material: sandstone, hardstone,
- Completion date: c. 1888
- Restored date: 1972; 1979; 1989; 2015–2016
- Dedicated to: Jkvr. J.C.P.H. van Aefferden (1820–1888); Colonel J.W.C. van Gorkum (1809–1880)

The Grave with the Hands (Dutch: Graf met de handjes, lit. 'Grave with the little hands') is a 19th-century funerary monument located in the Old Cemetery of Roermond in the southern Netherlands. It comprises two nearly identical tombstones on either side of a wall separating the Catholic and Protestant sections of the cemetery, linked by clasped stone hands. They join the graves of Roman Catholic noblewoman Jonkvrouw Josephina Carolina Petronella Hubertina van Aefferden (1820–1888) and her Protestant soldier husband, Jacob Warnerus Constantinus van Gorkum (1809–1880), who had to be buried in separate sections due to religious segregation rules. It was officially listed as a rijksmonument (state monument) in 2002.

== The couple ==
=== Background ===
Jonkvrouw Josephine (or Josephina) Caroline Petronella Hubertina van Aefferden was born in Roermond on 28 June 1820, the ninth of ten children born to Jonkheer Johannes Baptista Alexander Franciscus van Aefferden (1767–1840) and Jonkvrouw Maria Agnes Brigitta Henrietta Petit (1779–1861). She belonged to the van Aefferden family, a German-speaking Roman Catholic noble family. During the Belgian Secession (1830–1831), her older brothers Albertus Petrus Josephus (1808–1892) and Felix Hendrik Johannes Hubertus (1811–1842), raised a battalion of soldiers from Brussels at their own expense to fight against Dutch forces with the aim of bringing Roermond under Belgian control.

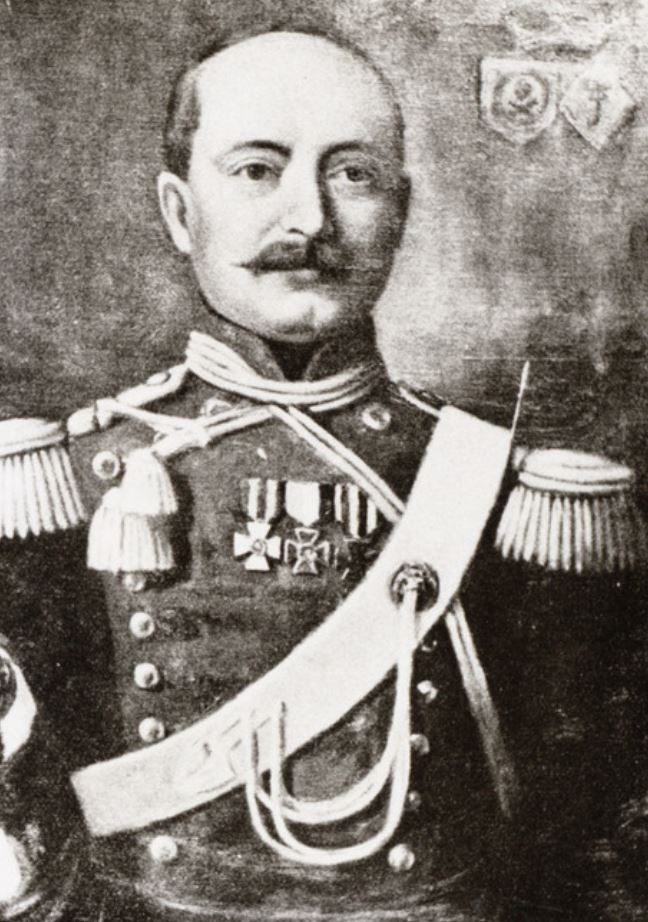
Portrait of van Gorkum dated c. (1850–1874)

Jacob Warnerus Constantinus van Gorkum was born in Amsterdam on 10 January 1809, into a Protestant (Dutch Reformed Church) family. He was the son of Jacoba Lydia Maria de Bère (1787–1849) and military officer Jan Egbert van Gorkum (1780–1862), a renowned military cartographer who mapped the Battle of Waterloo, and a close confidant of King William I of the Netherlands. Like his father, van Gorkum joined the Dutch army, rising to cavalry colonel. After the 1839 Treaty of London divided the province of Limburg, leaving the eastern part Dutch and the western part Belgian, he was stationed in Roermond as commander of the Dutch garrison, later serving as the region's militia commissioner.

=== Marriage ===
The couple was married on 3 November 1842. Their interfaith union stirred controversy in predominantly Catholic Roermond. It contravened the Dutch principle of pillarisation, limiting social interaction between the groups; a traditional Dutch proverb held: "Two faiths on one pillow, the devil sleeps between them" (Twee geloven op één kussen, daar slaapt de duivel tussen). The van Aefferden family also opposed the union due to the couple's age gap, disparity in social status, and the 1830-31 war when van Gorkum and the van Aefferden brothers fought on opposite sides. To avoid provocation, the couple held their wedding in the German village of Pont, near Geldern and just across the border from Venlo. Despite the opposition, their marriage endured for thirty-eight years; their five children were raised in the Catholic faith.

=== Death and burial ===
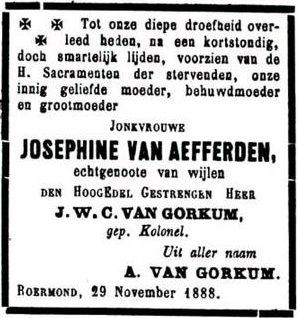
Death notice of Josephine van Aefferden in Maas-en Roerbode, 1 December 1888, page 2

The couple's graves are located in the Begraafplaats Nabij Kapel in 't Zand (transl. Cemetery Near the Chapel in the Sand), informally known as the Old Cemetery in Roermond. The site began as a Jewish burial ground and was expanded in 1785 to accommodate Christian residents, following Emperor Joseph II's decree that banned burials inside churches and city walls throughout the Holy Roman Empire. A municipal ordinance of 9 November 1857 divided the cemetery into distinct sections for Protestants, Jews, and Catholics. Architect Pierre Cuypers redesigned the cemetery in 1858, walling off separate enclosures for different religious sections and reserving a place for his own family.

Van Gorkum died on 28 August 1880. Due to pillarisation, the interfaith couple could not legally share a burial plot. Van Aefferden therefore had her husband buried in the Protestant section, on a footpath along a wall separating it from the Catholic section. After her death on 29 November 1888, their children carried out her final wishes: rather than burial in the van Aefferden family vault, they placed her grave in the Catholic section against the wall opposite her husband's, and connected them by two stone arms reaching across the wall and holding hands.

== Description of the monument ==
The monument was likely created in 1888, the year of van Aefferden's death, possibly by the Atelier Cuypers-Stoltzenberg. This 19th-century Neo-Gothic funerary monument consists of two tall gravestones placed back-to-back on either side of a brick wall. A sculpted arm extends from the rear of each grave marker and reaches over the wall to clasp the other, creating both a physical and symbolic connection across the divide. Both share a nearly identical design, comprising a hardstone base, a central section featuring a recessed pointed arch inscription panel, and an upper section with relief panel of carved heraldry, capped with a gabled roof with a cross finial. The rijksmonument documentation identifies the gravestone material as sandstone.

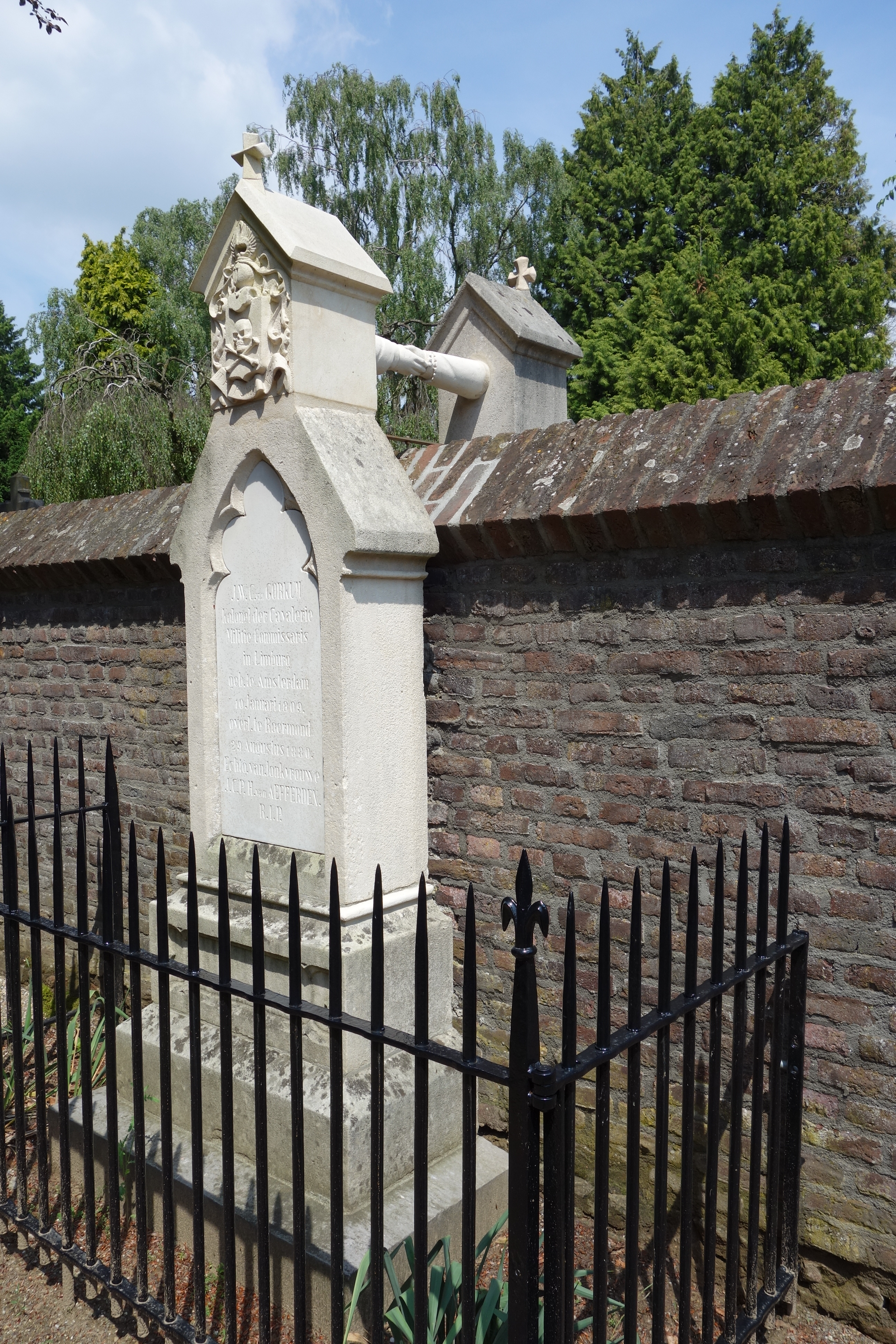
The monument seen from the Protestant section, protected by a wrought-iron fence with a rectangular plan.

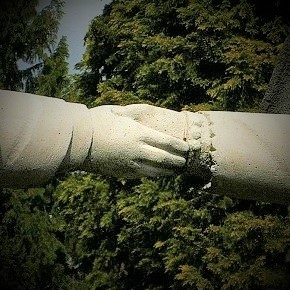
The clasped hands linking the grave markers symbolise the enduring connection between the spouses across the boundaries of religion, family alliances, and death itself.

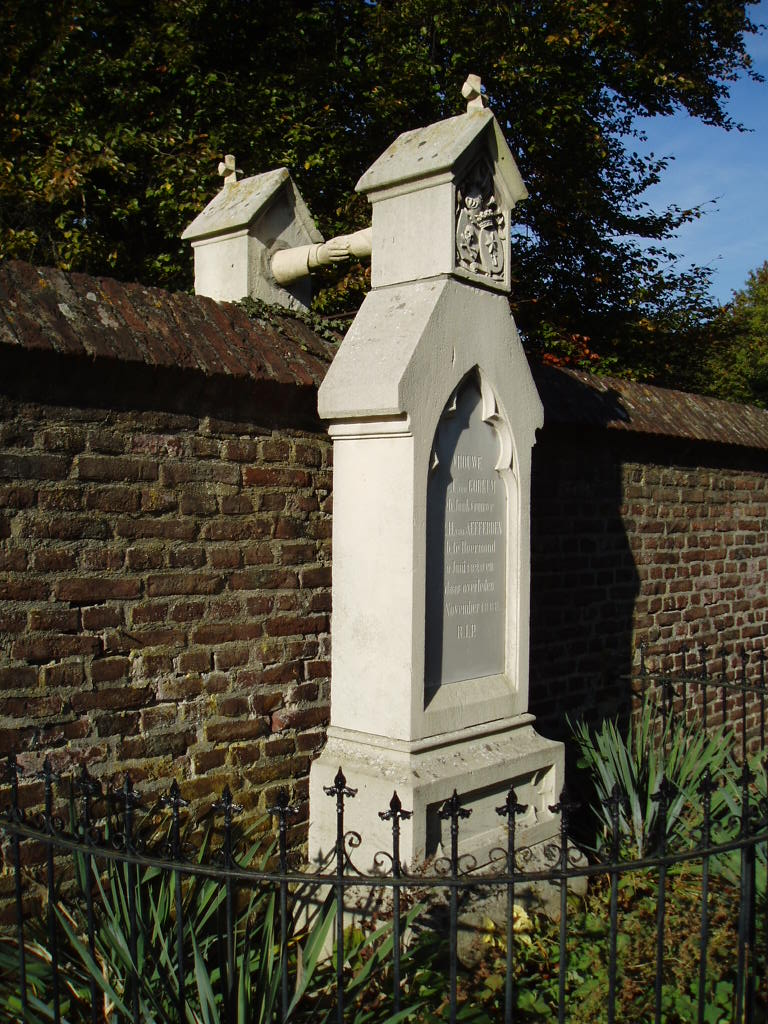
The monument seen from the Catholic section, protected by a wrought-iron fence with a semicircular plan.

While sharing a similar overall design, they also feature differences in detailing: each displays a personalised inscription, unique personal heraldry, and distinct sleeve details. The relief panel on his side bears the coat of arms of the van Gorkum family, while her side displays her arms of alliance. The Latin motto Vivit post funera virtus (transl. Virtue outlives death), originally from the van Gorkum family coat of arms, is chiselled on both. Written in Dutch, the inscriptions on the recessed panels are:

Dutch

J.W.C. van GORKUM
Kolonel der Cavalerie
Militie Commissaris
in Limburg
geb. te Amsterdam
10 Januari 1809.
overl. te Roermond
29 Augustus 1880.
Echtg. van Jonkvrouwe
J.C.P.H. van AEFFERDEN
R.I.P.

— Protestant side of the monument (Note: Echtg. is the standard historical Dutch abbreviation for Echtgenoot (Husband/Spouse).)
Translation:
English translation

J.W.C. van GORKUM
Colonel of Cavalry
Militia Commissioner
in Limburg
born in Amsterdam
10 January 1809.
Died in Roermond
29 August 1880.
Husband of Jonkvrouwe
J.C.P.H. van AEFFERDEN
R.I.P.

Dutch

VROUWE
J.W.C. van GORKUM
geb. Jonkvrouwe
J.C.P.H. van AEFFERDEN
geb. te Roermond
28 Juni 1820 en
aldaar overleden
29 November 1888.
R.I.P.

— Catholic side of the monument (Note: geb. is the Dutch abbreviation for geboren (born), used here to denote her maiden name (née).)
Translation:
English translation

LADY
J.W.C. van GORKUM
born Jonkvrouwe
J.C.P.H. van AEFFERDEN
born in Roermond
28 June 1820 and
died there
29 November 1888.
R.I.P.

== Heritage status and restoration ==
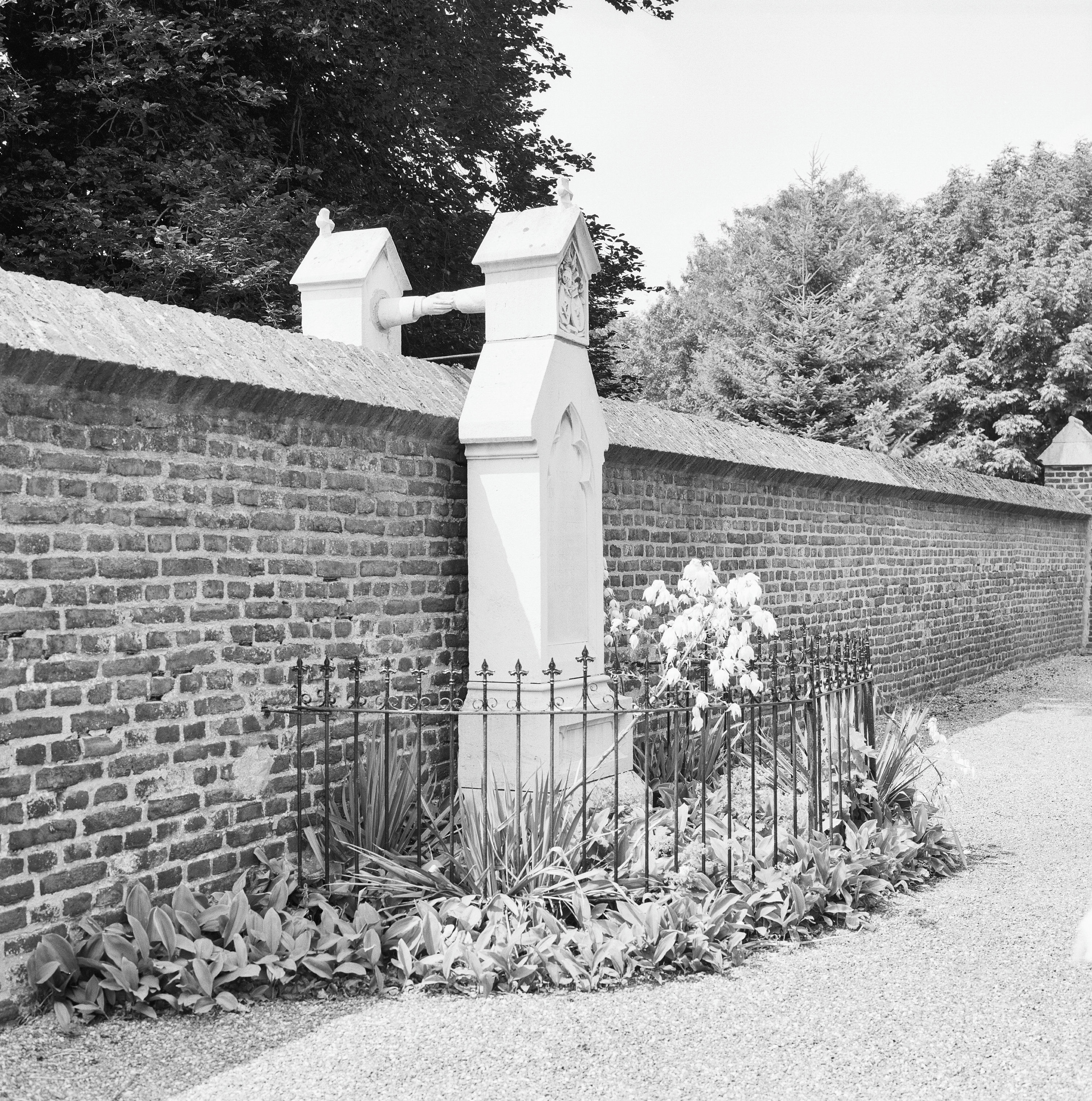
Official black and white photo of the monument released by Rijksdienst voor het Cultureel Erfgoed

Established in 1996, The Old Cemetery Foundation protects the site and its monuments for posterity, which includes overseeing restoration work. Largely due to the foundation's advocacy, in October 2001, the State Secretary for Ministry of Education, Culture and Science of Netherlands designated the entire cemetery and ten individual objects as rijksmonuments (national heritage objects). On 27 May 2002, the Grave with the Hands was listed as rijksmonument number 520489.

The monument has been restored several times. The original hands were first repaired in 1972. In 1989, a shift in one of the grave markers broke the connecting pin of the hands, prompting the municipality to fund a new pair. When the Protestant-side marker later sank against the wall and suffered further damage, the Old Cemetery Foundation organised a full restoration in 2015 with the Sivero firm and sculptor Armand Mathijs. The marker was dismantled and straightened; after replacement, the original top sections removed during this work were housed in the cemetery's former mortuary building, joining the original hands.

== Legacy ==
In the 1980s, German priest and artist Herbert Falken (1932–2023) created a series of drawings and accompanying text depicting the monument, despite never having seen it in person. His work was based solely on a small photograph and an article in the Frankfurter Allgemeine Zeitung. He wrote, "The monument of Roermond stands for all visible and invisible walls between human beings."

The story of the couple and their monument, titled after Josephina van Gorkum, was dramatised in 2016 in Les Culottées (The Brazen), a French webcomic by Pénélope Bagieu that depicts short biographies of unusual or inspiring women. The comic was published in two printed volumes in France, translated into English, and released globally in 2017 as Brazen: Rebel Ladies Who Rocked the World. In 2020, it was adapted into an animated series that aired on France Télévisions. The animated series also was translated into Portuguese and broadcast on RTP2.

On 5 February 2025, a proposal was submitted to the Executive Board of the Municipality of Roermond regarding street names for the Rooswinkelterrein residential redevelopment near Prins Bernhardstraat. Because the site is within walking distance of the Grave with the Hands, the board recommended naming the two new streets Jacob van Gorkumstraat and Josephina van Aefferdenstraat. (Note: straat is Dutch for street.) Following review by the Citizens and Society Committee, the municipality officially enacted the decision, publishing the formal decree in the Municipal Gazette on 25 February 2025.
