= Vondelkerk =

Church in Amsterdam, Netherlands

Vondel Church
- Vondelkerk
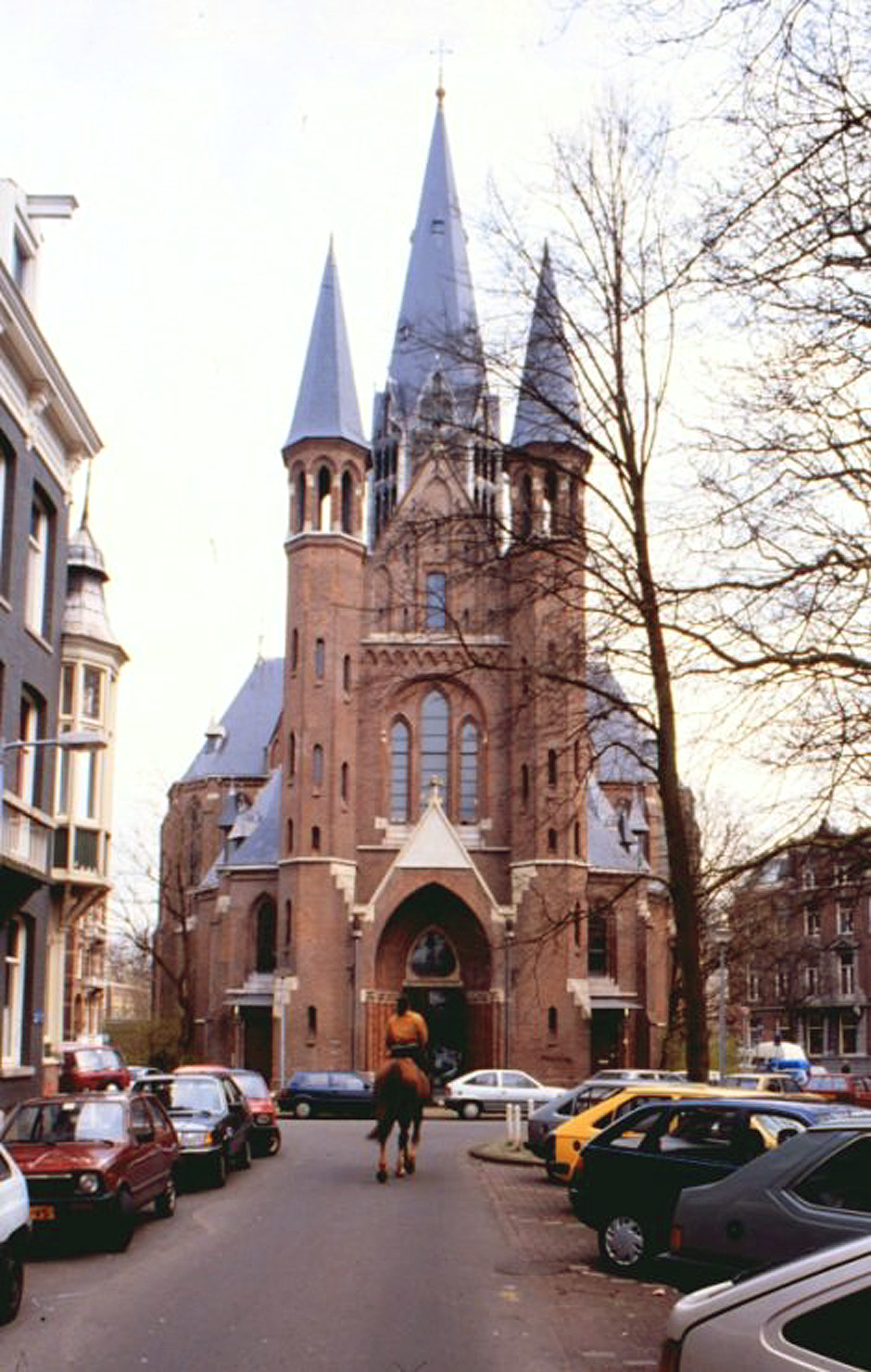
- Vondelkerk church in the 1990s

Religion
- Affiliation: Roman Catholic
- Region: North Holland
- Rite: Roman Rite
- Ecclesiastical or organizational status: Deconsecrated
- Ownership: Stadsherstel Amsterdam (prior to 2026 fire)
- Governing body: Diocese of Haarlem–Amsterdam (former)
- Patron: Sacred Heart of Jesus
- Year consecrated: 1880
- Status: Destroyed by fire

Location
- Location: Vondelstraat
- Municipality: Amsterdam
- Country: Netherlands
- Interactive map of Vondel Church
- Coordinates: 52°21′40″N 4°52′25″E

Architecture
- Architects: Pierre Cuypers (original); Joseph Cuypers (tower reconstruction); André van Stigt (restoration)
- Type: Church
- Style: Neo-Gothic
- Established: c. 1870 (planning)
- Completed: 1880

Specifications
- Spire: 1
- Spire height: 50 m
- Materials: Brick, stone, steel (tower structure)

Website
- Stadsherstel | Vondelkerk

The Vondel Church (Dutch: Vondelkerk) is a church building located on Vondelstraat in Amsterdam-West. From 1880 to 1977, the building—designed by architect Pierre Cuypers—served as the Church of the Most Sacred Heart of Jesus for the Roman Catholic parish of the same name. After its deconsecration, the central nave was used for purposes including concerts, while surrounding spaces were rented out as offices.

In a fire in November 1904, the original tower was destroyed. It was rebuilt according to a design by Joseph Cuypers, son of Pierre Cuypers. During the early hours of 1 January 2026, another fire broke out, the tower was destroyed, and parts of the building collapsed.

== History ==
=== Planning and construction ===
Around 1870, plans were developed to build a church near the Vondelpark, and architect Pierre Cuypers was commissioned for the project. Cuypers devoted special attention to this Neo-Gothic church, which he could see from his own residence. In 1873, a nationwide lottery was organized to finance the completion of the church. Queen Sophie of Württemberg donated two valuable salon lamps for the lottery, and Pope Pius IX contributed an expensive cameo.

The building was put into use on 16 June 1880. It was the first church in the world dedicated to the Most Sacred Heart of Jesus.

Cuypers designed the Vondel Church based on medieval precedents, while employing modern techniques such as steel constructions for the tower. The original entrance was on the south side, aligned with Vondelstraat. The church was characterized by its use of colored brickwork, primarily dark and light red for the pillars. The vaults featured yellow fields and green-and-white ribs. After religious services ceased, offices were installed; the former choir and altar area was converted into a cloakroom.

“A tower must be tall; a low tower is an abomination,” was a well-known quote attributed to Cuypers, explaining the original fifty-meter-high tower.

=== 1904 fire ===
In a major fire in 1904, this original tower was lost. Thanks to an ingenious steel ring construction on which the tower rested, the rest of the church was spared. The reconstruction of the tower followed a design by Joseph Cuypers and, like the original construction, was made possible through numerous donations, including from non-Catholics.

=== Renovation ===
Along the side aisles, tile panels were installed as backgrounds for the Stations of the Cross. Statues of saints stood on the consoles of the pillars. These were auctioned off and removed in the 1970s.

At the center of the church, looking straight upward, a shield could be seen depicting a symbolic representation of the holy city of Jerusalem on a blue background. The stained-glass windows included representations of the four Evangelists: Mark, Matthew, Luke, and John.

=== Decline ===
On 23 October 1969, the Society of Dutch Literature (Maatschappij der Nederlandse Letterkunde), in collaboration with the VPRO organized a controversial television program in the Vondel Church in honor of P. C. Hooft Award laureate Gerard Reve.

In August 1978, the church building was closed due to structural instability on the advice of the Diocese of Haarlem-Amsterdam. On 12 October 1979, the diocese sold the church for one guilder to an investor. The building was subsequently occupied by squatters.

In November 1984, the Stichting Vondelkerk (Vondel Church Foundation), established on 2 October 1980, purchased the building to preserve and restore it. On 31 December 1993, ownership was transferred to the Amsterdam Monuments Fund, which merged with Stadsherstel Amsterdam on 31 December 1999. The Vondel Church was restored by architect André van Stigt and subsequently preserved as a multifunctional building for the city.

=== 2026 fire ===
During the early morning hours of New Year's Day 2026, a fire broke out around 12:50 AM (GMT+1) in the church tower. The tower and part of the central nave collapsed as a result. Due to the risk of the fire spreading and heavy smoke, residents in the immediate vicinity were evacuated. The fire spread across the entire roof, and large quantities of water from the Vondelpark were used to extinguish the blaze.

The fire almost completely destroyed the building. The exterior walls of the church remained standing. It was initially feared that the church was unsalvageable. However, a day later, an assessment by surveyors and experts revealed that a full complete restoration and reconstruction of the Vondelkerk church is possible.

== Gallery ==
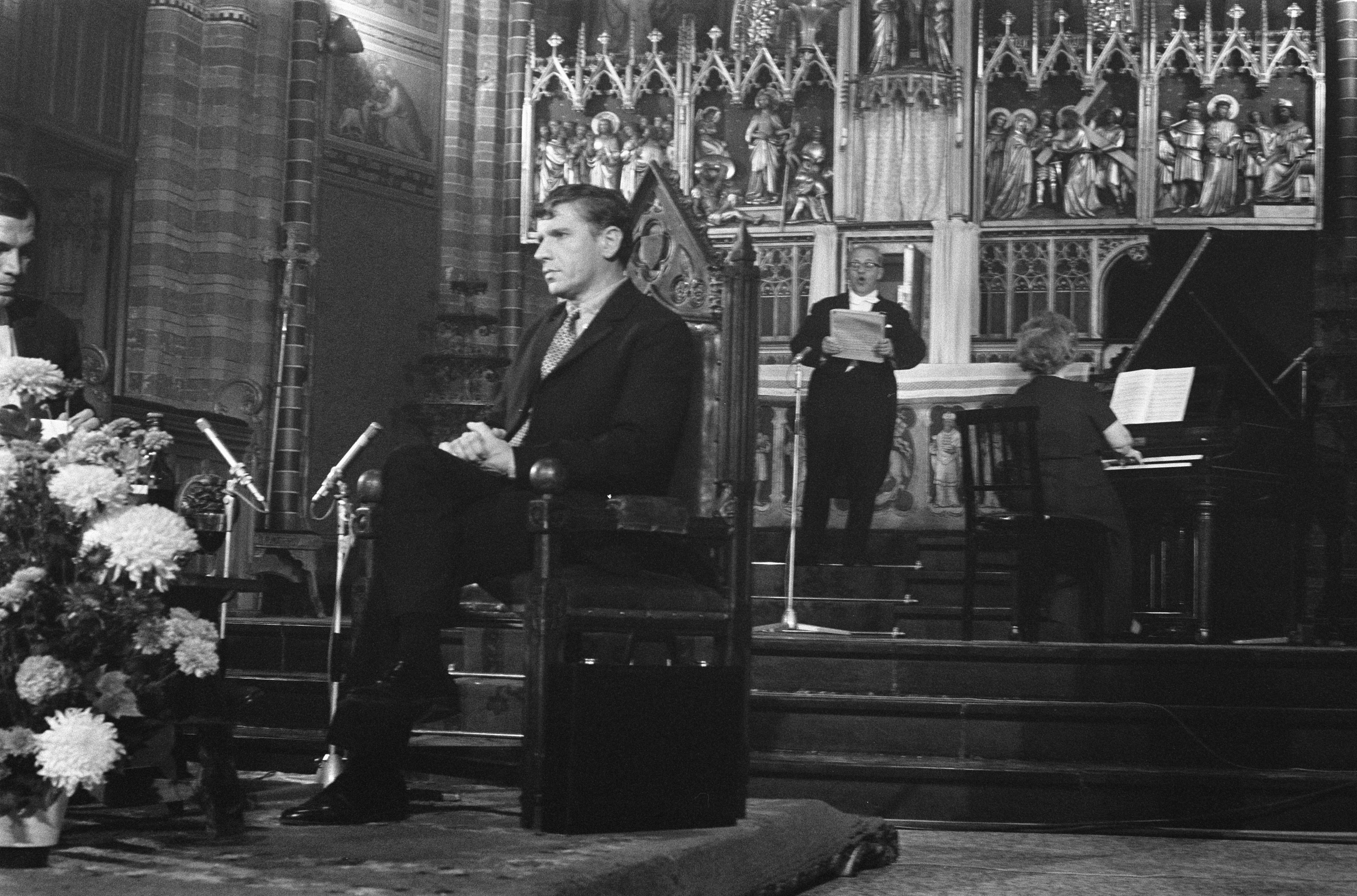
Gerard Reve in the Vondel Church (1969, after the presentation of the P.C. Hooft Prize)

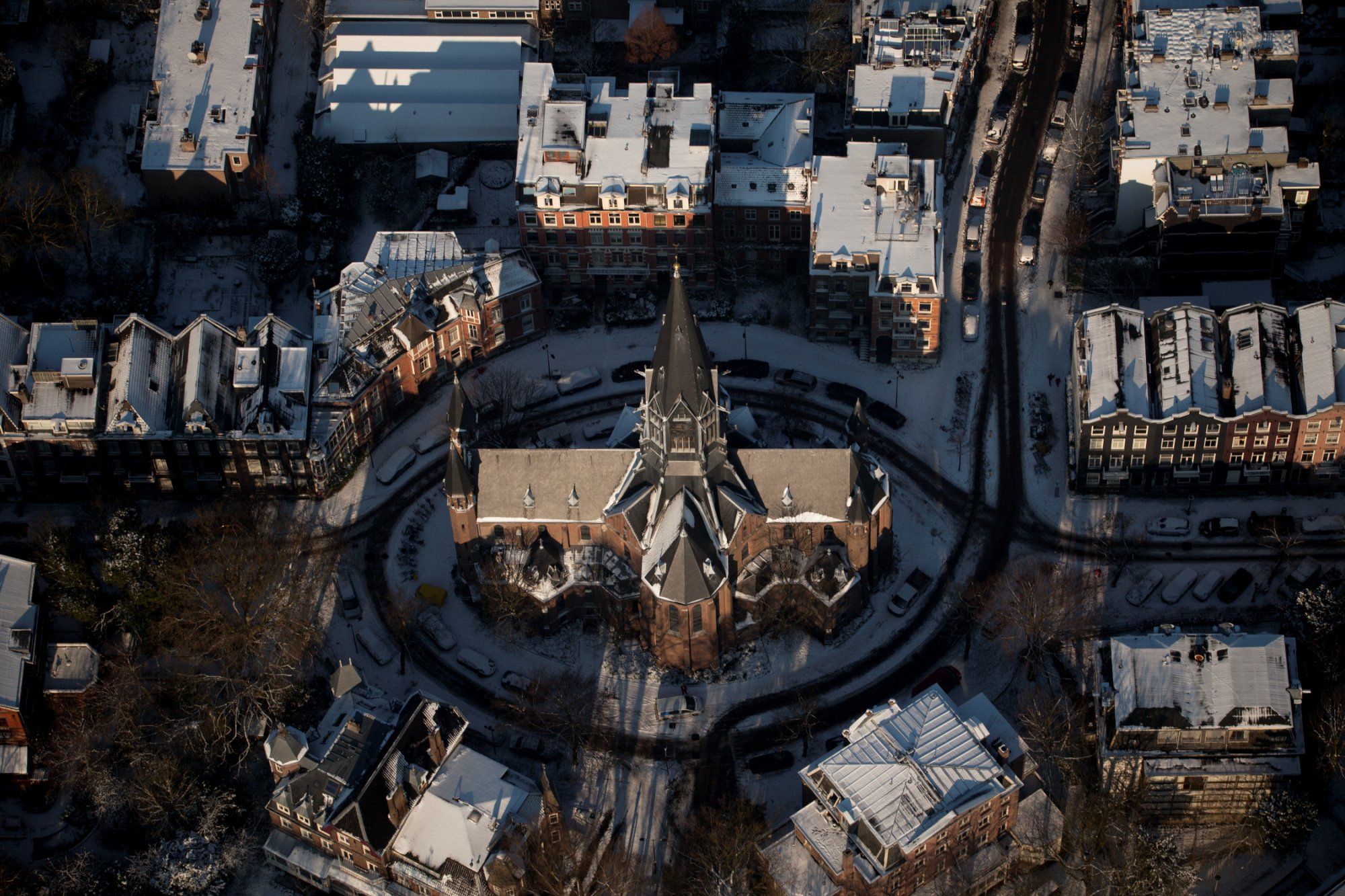
Photo of the Vondelkerk by Stadsherstel Amsterdam

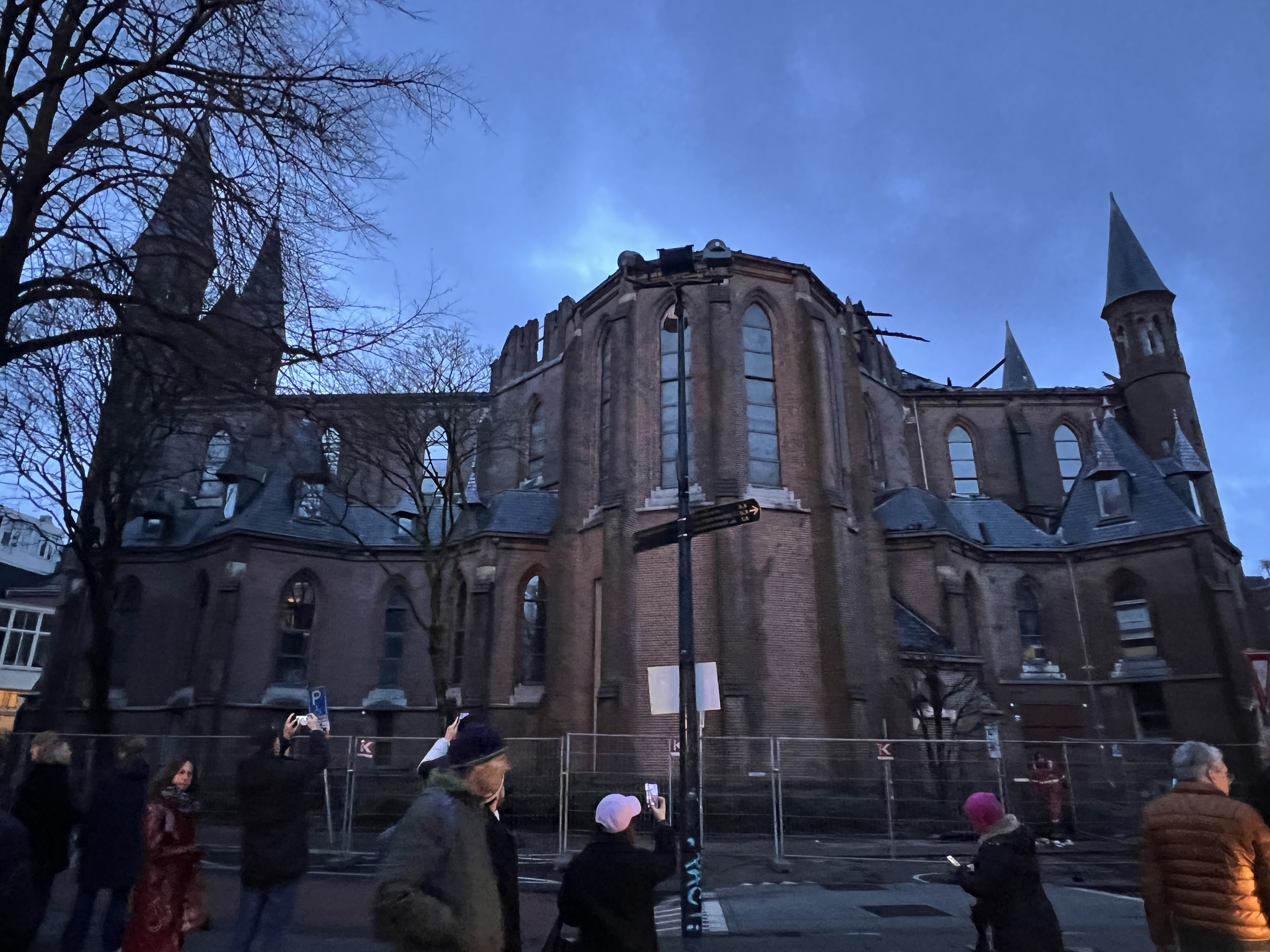
Vondelkerk after the 2026 fire
