= Jan Schröder =

Dutch cyclist (1941–2007)

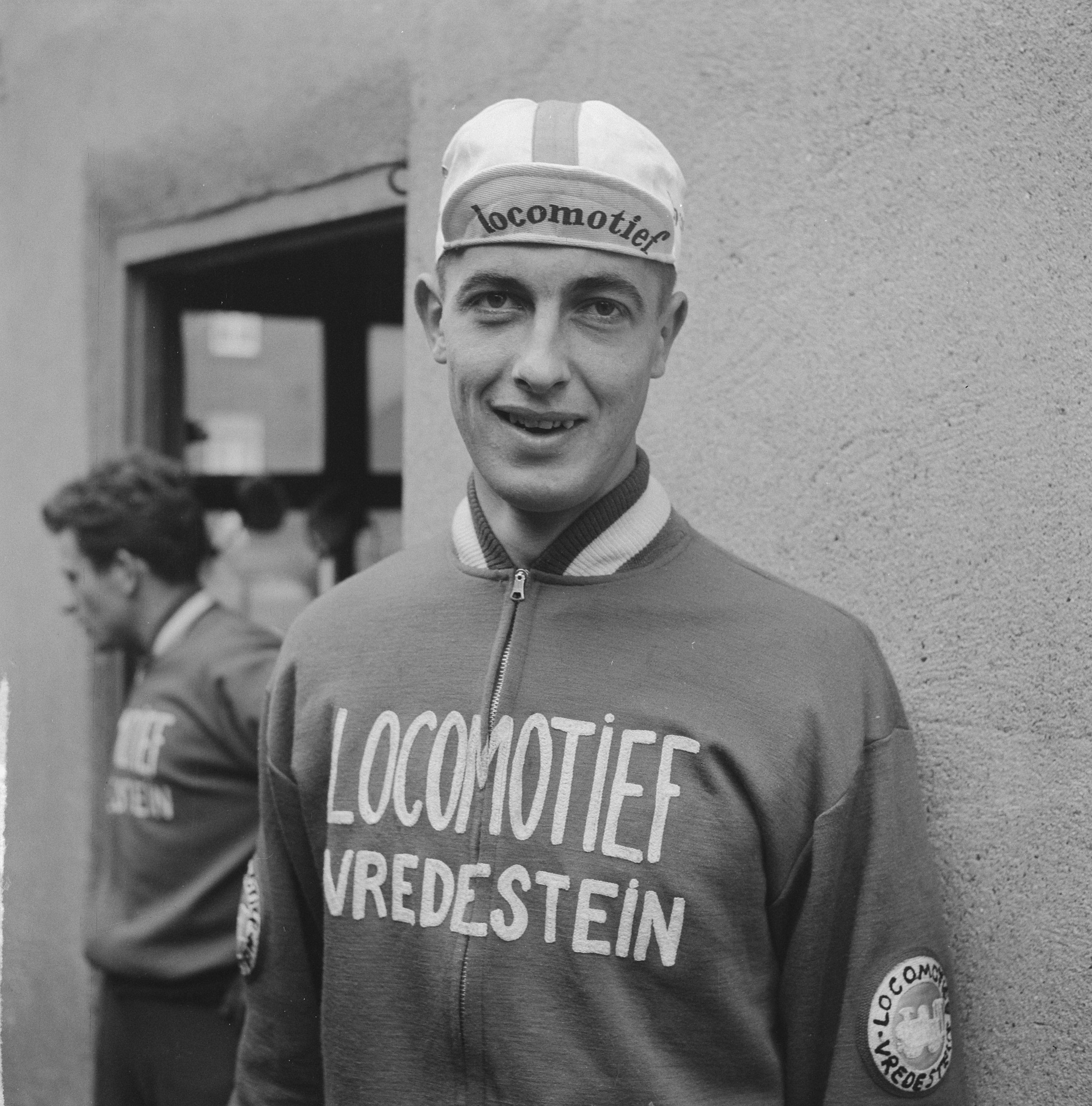
- Schröder in 1963

Personal information
- Born: 16 June 1941 Koningsbosch, Netherlands
- Died: 4 January 2007 (aged 65) Koningsbosch, Netherlands

Cycling career
- Sport: Cycling
- Disciplines: Road, track
- Role: Rider

Professional teams
- 1963: Locomotief-Vredestein
- 1964: Acifit
- 1965: Frites Specialist
- 1966: VRP-Locomotief
- 1967: Willem II-Gazelle

Jan Schröder (16 June 1941 – 4 January 2007) was a Dutch professional road and track cyclist.

== Biography ==
Born in Koningsbosch, Schröder won his first professional race in 1961, when he outsprinted Henk Nijdam and Adriaan Biemans in the Omloop der Kempen. A year later he was the strongest in the Ster van Zwolle. His third and final professional win came in 1966 when he won the criterium race in Enter. During his further career he reached three more second places and three more third places in professional road cycling races. In the later part of his career, in 1976 he won a silver medal in the individual pursuit at the Dutch track cycling championships.

Schröder died on 4 January 2007 in his hometown Koningsbosch at the age of 65.

== Notable results ==
1961

- 1st in Omloop der Kempen

1962

- 2nd in Ronde van Noord-Holland
- 1st in Ster van Zwolle
- 3rd in Ronde van Limburg

1964

- 3rd in Criterium Simpelveld
- 3rd in Criterium Rijen

1966

- 1st in Criterium Enter

1967

- 2nd in Criterium Buggenhout
- 2nd in Criterium Neerbeek

1976

- 2nd in the individual pursuit at the Dutch national track cycling championships

== Professional teams ==
- (Netherlands) Locomotief-Vredestein (1963)
- (Netherlands) Acifit (1964)
- (Netherlands) Frites Specialist (1965)
- (Netherlands) VRP-Locomotief (1966)
- (Netherlands) Willem II-Gazelle (1967)
