= Sittard dialect =

Limburgish dialect

- Zittesj
- Pronunciation: [ˈzetəʃ]
- Native to: Netherlands, Germany
- Region: Sittard, Koningsbosch, Selfkant
- Language family: Indo-European: Germanic; West Germanic; Istvaeonic; Low Franconian; Meuse-Rhenish; Limburgish; East Limburgish; Southern East Limburgish; Sittard dialect

Language codes
- ISO 639-3: –
- Glottolog: None

The Sittard diphthongization (after Dols, 1953) extends into the German municipality Selfkant

The Sittard dialect (Dutch: Sittards, Limburgish: Zittesj, German: Selfkanter Platt, in reference to the variety used in Germany) is a Limburgish dialect spoken mainly in the Dutch city of Sittard. It is also spoken in Koningsbosch and in a small part of Germany (Selfkant), but quickly becoming extinct there. Of all other important Limburgish dialects, the dialect of Sittard is most closely related to that of Roermond.

== Characteristics ==
The Sittard dialect belongs to East Limburgish, which means it has a postalveolar consonant at the onset of words beginning with clusters such as sl and st, in contrast with other variants of Limburgish such as Maastrichtian and in Dutch.

The most important characteristic which distinguishes the dialect of Sittard from adjacent Limburgish dialects is the so-called Sittard diphthongization, i.e. the replacement of the close-mid monophthongs /eː/, /øː/ and /oː/ with the wide diphthongs /ɛj/, /œj/ and /ɔw/ in some words such as neit /ˈnɛjt/ ("not", originally neet /ˈneːt/), zuike /ˈzœjkə/ ("to search", originally zeuke /ˈzøːkə/) and bloud /ˈblɔwt/ ("blood", originally blood /ˈbloːt/). It resembles the Polder Dutch phenomenon in Standard Dutch, though it is extended to the environment before /ʀ/ (where an epenthetic schwa is inserted before the consonant), as in beier /ˈbɛjəʀ/ ("beer"). This phenomenon was first examined thoroughly in the first half of the 1940s by Willy Dols, who showed that this Sittard diphthongization typically occurred in syllables with a push tone. New research at the beginning of the 21st century has shown that the diphthongization once served to emphasize the difference in vowel length which distinguishes syllables with a push tone from those with a dragging tone.

== Phonology ==
=== Vowels ===
Vowel phonemes
	Front				Central		Back	
	unrounded		rounded		Central		Back	
	short	long	short	long	short	long	short	long
Close		iː ⟨ie⟩		yː ⟨uu⟩				uː ⟨oe⟩
Close-mid	e ⟨i⟩	eː ⟨ee⟩	ø ⟨u⟩	øː ⟨eu⟩	ə ⟨e⟩		o ⟨ó⟩	oː ⟨oo⟩
Open-mid	ɛ ⟨è⟩	ɛː ⟨ae⟩	œ ⟨ö⟩	œː ⟨äö⟩	ə ⟨e⟩		ɔ ⟨o⟩	ɔː ⟨ao⟩
Open	æ ⟨e⟩					aː ⟨aa⟩	ɑ ⟨a⟩	
Diphthongs	ɛj ⟨ei/ij⟩ œj ⟨ui⟩ ɔw ⟨au/ou⟩ aj ⟨ai⟩ aw ⟨aw⟩							

- /ə/ is restricted to unstressed syllables.

=== Consonants ===
Consonant phonemes
		Labial	Alveolar	Postalveolar	Dorsal	Glottal
Nasal		m ⟨m⟩	n ⟨n⟩	ɲ ⟨nj⟩	ŋ ⟨ng⟩	
Plosive / affricate	voiceless	p ⟨p⟩	t ⟨t⟩	tʃ ⟨tj⟩	k ⟨k⟩	
Plosive / affricate	voiced	b ⟨b⟩	d ⟨d⟩	dʒ ⟨dj⟩	ɡ ⟨gk⟩	
Fricative	voiceless	f ⟨f⟩	s ⟨s⟩	ʃ ⟨sj⟩	x ⟨ch⟩	
Fricative	voiced	v ⟨v⟩	z ⟨z⟩	ʒ ⟨zj⟩	ɣ ⟨g⟩	ɦ ⟨h⟩
Liquid			l ⟨l⟩	ʎ ⟨lj⟩	ʀ ⟨r⟩	
Approximant		w ⟨w⟩			j ⟨j⟩	

=== Pitch accent ===
As many other Limburgish dialects, the Sittard dialect features a contrastive pitch accent, with minimal pairs such as goud /ˈɣɔwt/ 'gold' (featuring the push tone) vs. goud /ˈɣɔwt˦/ 'good' (featuring the dragging tone, transcribed as a high tone). The push tone is realized as a rising-falling contour in the declarative pattern, whereas the dragging tone varies between rising (when the sentence focus falls on the syllable that is non-final) and a shallow rising-falling contour when the syllable is sentence-final. The distinction between the two tones is neutralized outside of the sentence focus. In interrogative sentences, the distinction is always made.

== Bibliography ==
- Belemans, Rob; Keulen, Ronny (2002), Taal in stad en land. Venloos, Roermonds en Sittards, Sdu Uitgevers, ISBN 90-12-09014-8
- Bodelier, Jorina (2011), Tone and intonation in the Lemiers dialect of Ripuarian (MA General Linguistics Thesis), Amsterdam: University of Amsterdam
- Hanssen, J. (2005). Tone and intonation in the dialect of Sittard (Thesis). Radboud Universiteit Nijmegen.
