= Berchmanianum =

University building in Nijmegen, Netherlands

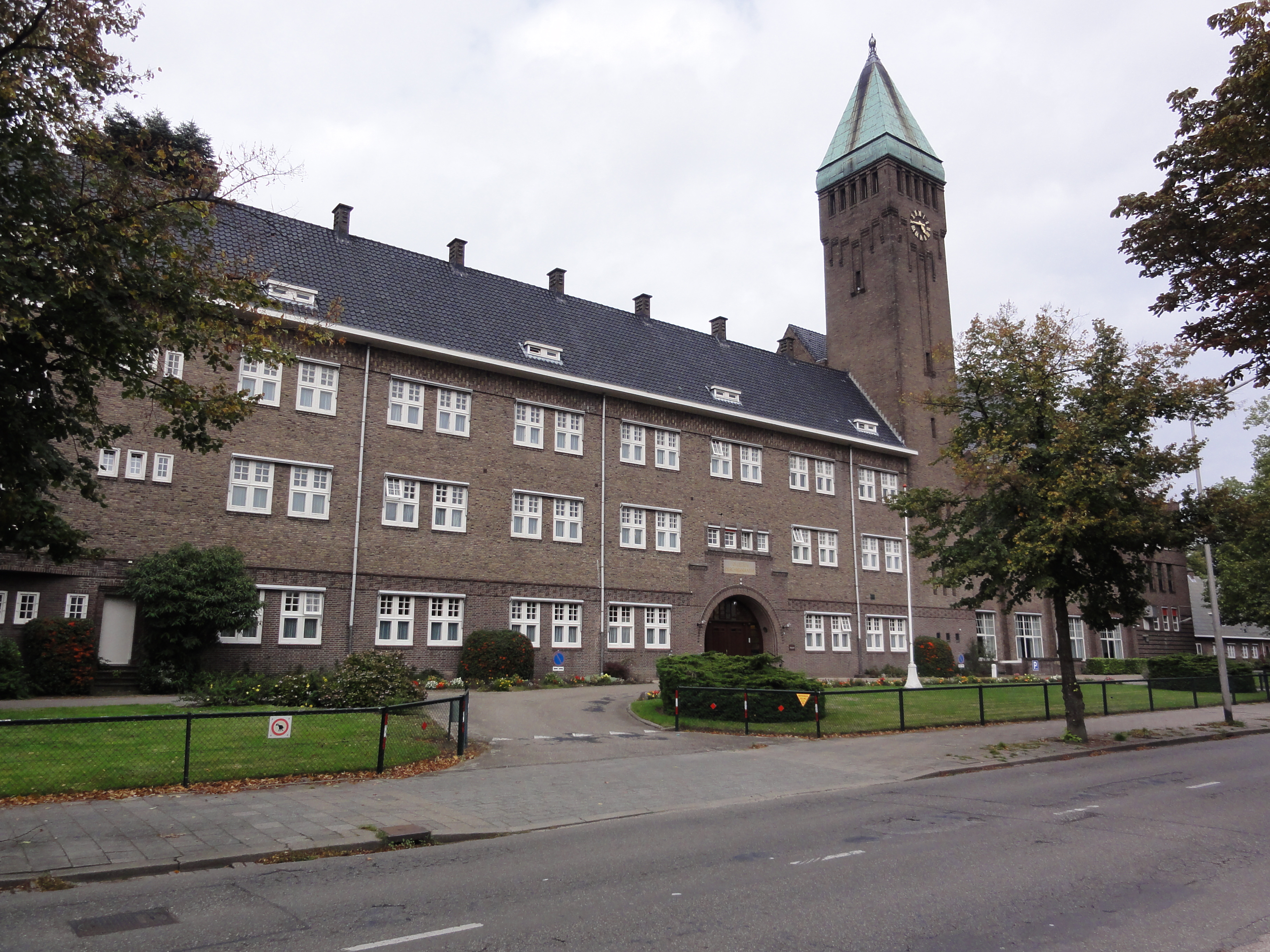
- Berchmanianum
- 51.816634°N 5.865119°E
- Location: Brakkenstein, Nijmegen
- Country: Netherlands
- Denomination: Roman Catholic
- Website: Berchmanianum.nl

History
- Former name: Collegium Berchmanianum
- Status: Active
- Founded: 1928
- Founder: Society of Jesus
- Dedication: St John Berchmans

Architecture
- Functional status: Residence
- Heritage designation: National Monument
- Architect(s): Joseph Cuypers and Pierre Cuypers Jr.
- Completed: 1929

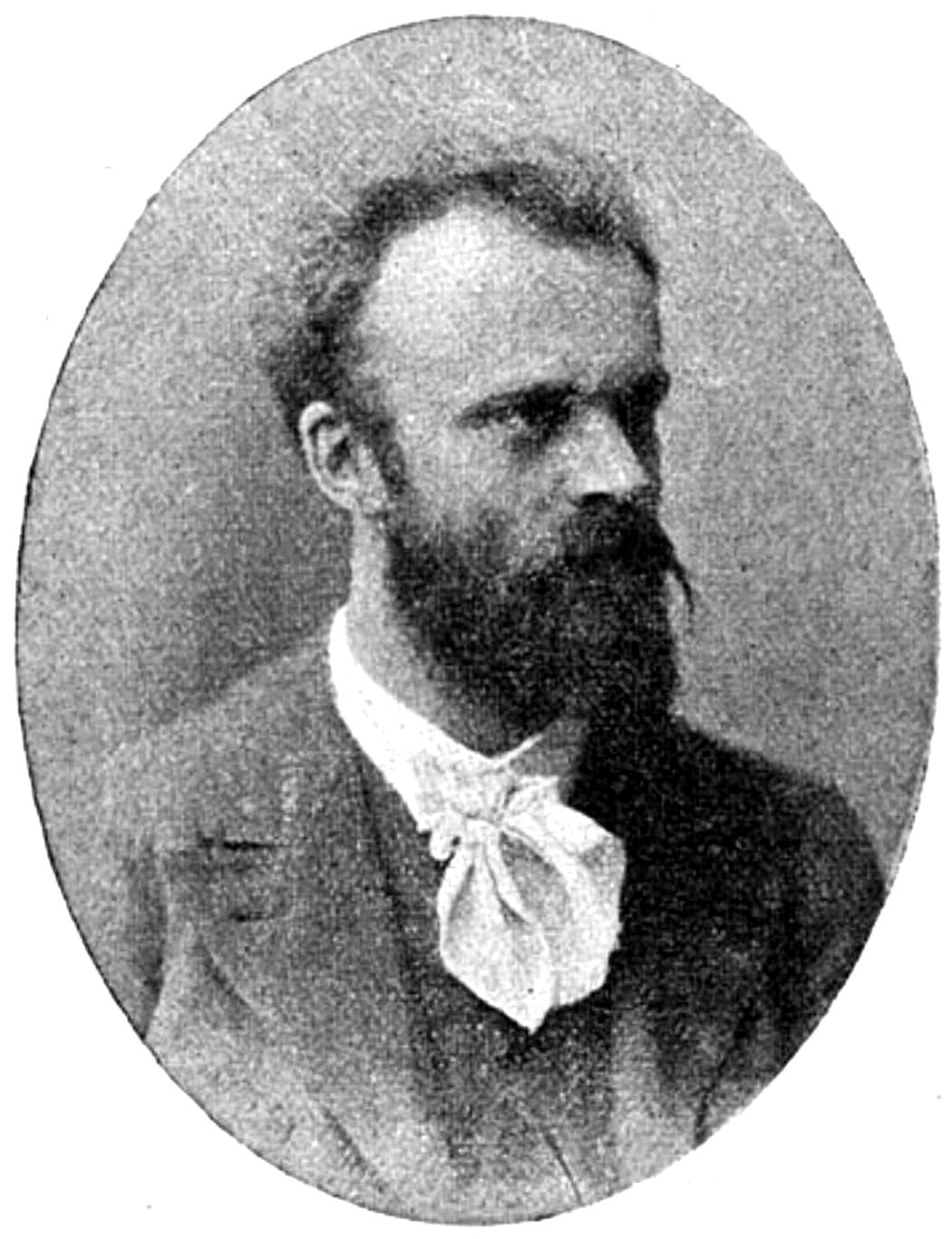
Portrait of the architect, Joseph Cuypers

The Berchmanianum or Collegium Berchmanianum is a former college and residence of the Society of Jesus in the Brakkenstein district of Nijmegen, Netherlands. It was opened in 1929, is a national monument, and is part of Radboud University Nijmegen as the Academic Building Berchmanianum.

== History ==
=== Foundation ===
In 1923, the Catholic University of Nijmegen (renamed in 2004 as the Radboud University) was founded. In the following decade many religious orders built communities in the city for their members to be students or teachers in the new establishment.

In 1928, the Jesuits founded a college in the city, dedicated to John Berchmans. It opened in 1929 and the garden was built in 1930. The architects were Joseph Cuypers and Pierre Cuypers Jr., the son and grandson of Pierre Cuypers.

=== World War II ===
In 1942, during the occupation of the city, the Nazi Schutzstaffel demanded the building for the Lebensborn project. However, during their time there, no children were born. In September 1944, the building returned to the Jesuits who continued to study there. This lasted until 1967, when it became a home (till December 2016) for elderly Jesuits and men from other Catholic religious orders.

=== 2018 ===
In October 2018 Berchmanianum became the Academy Building for Radboud University Nijmegen. Berchmanianum houses the executive board of Radboud University, as well as a number of supporting services such as Administrative & Legal Affairs, Radboud International and Academic Affairs.

== Exterior ==
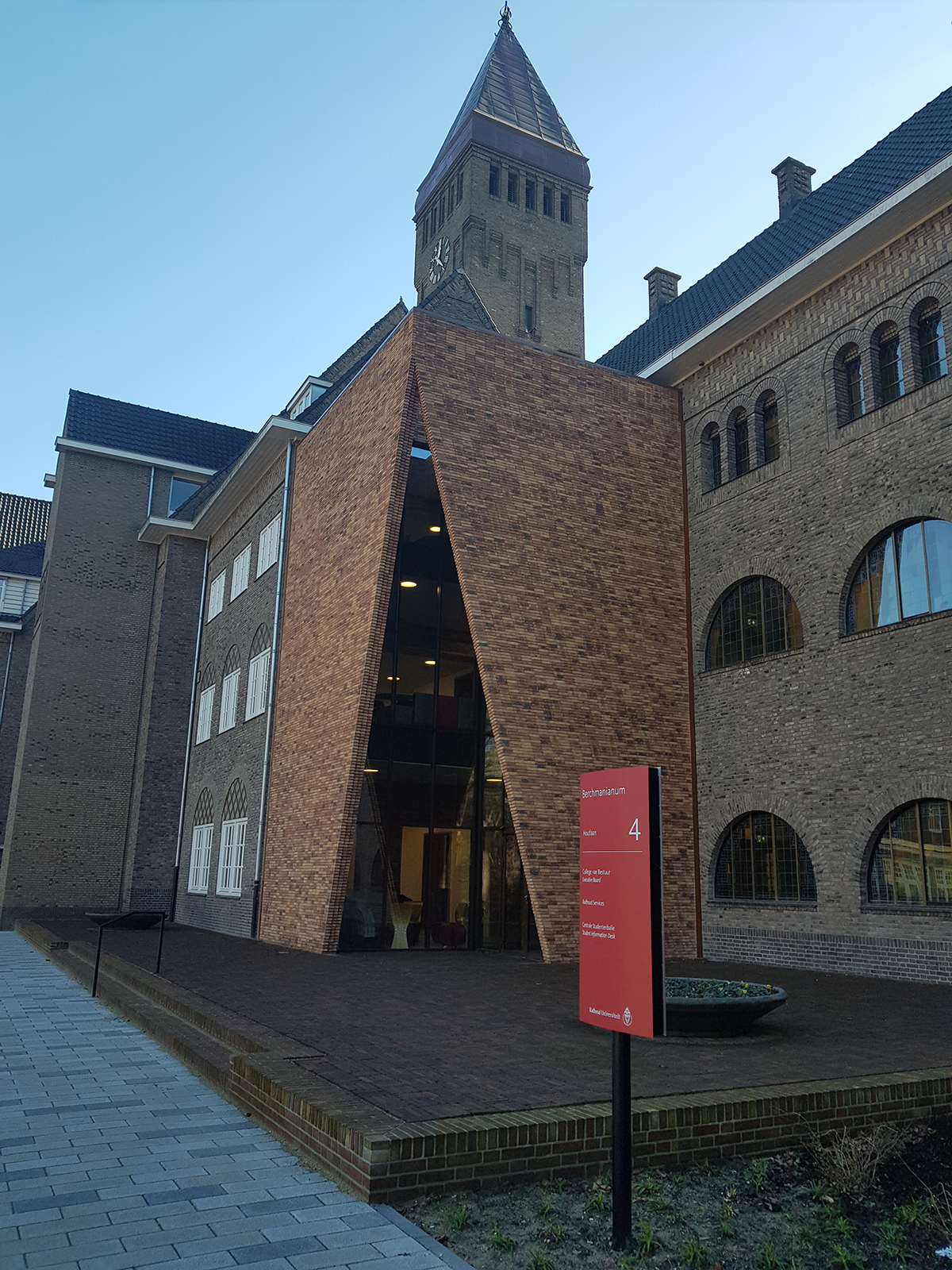
Main entrance Berchmanianum (courtyard)

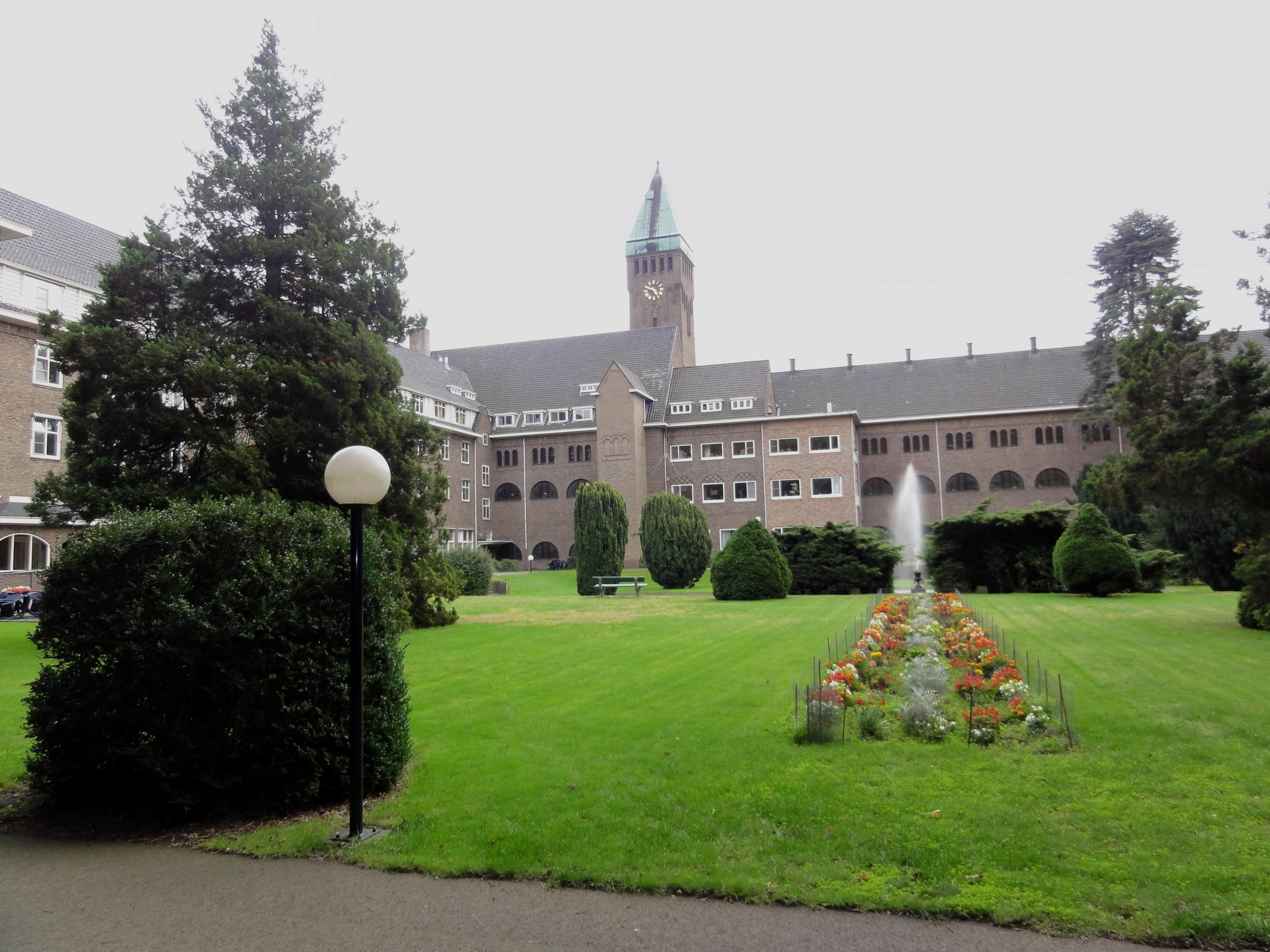

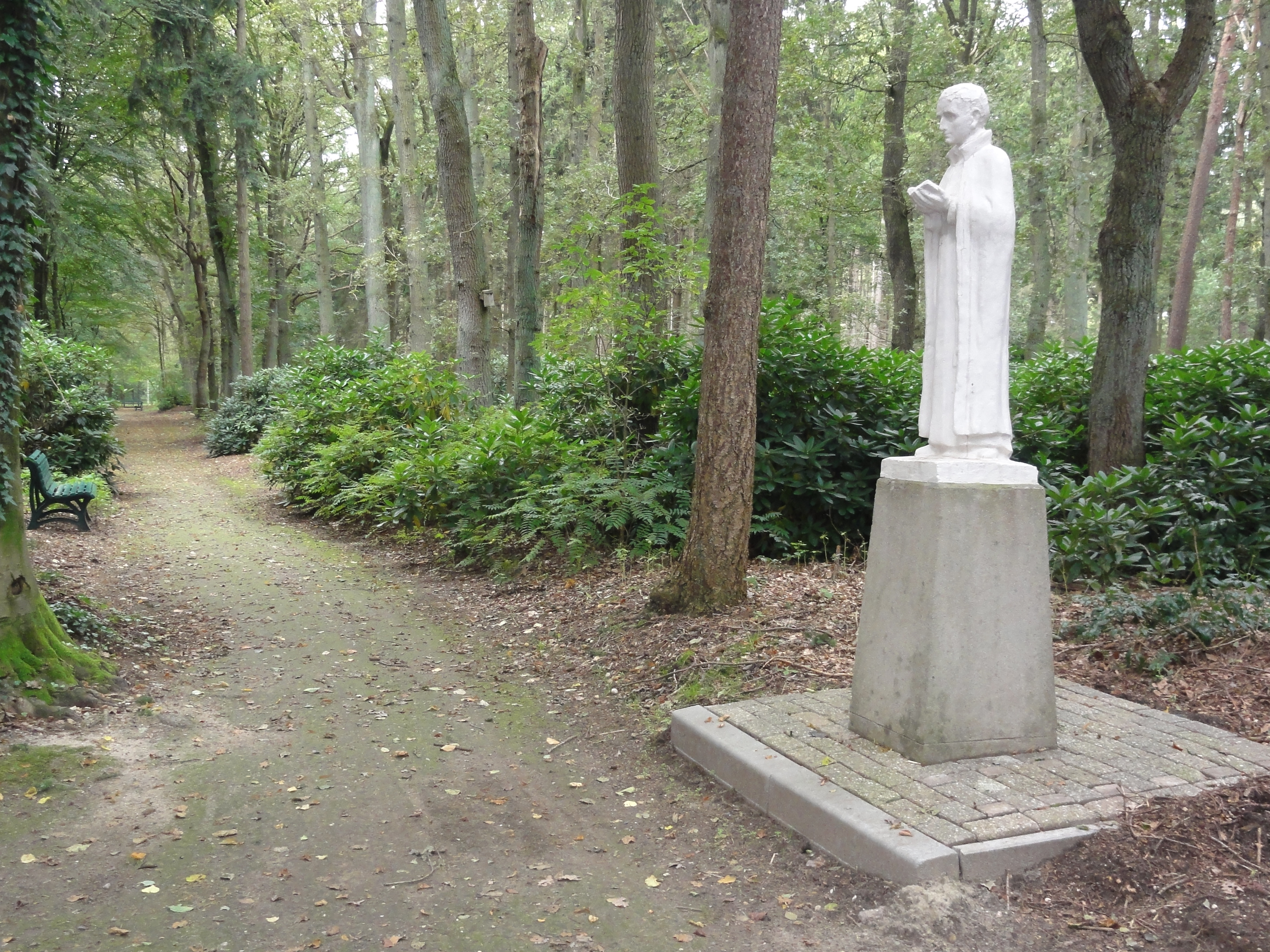
Statue of St Jan Berchmans in the gardens

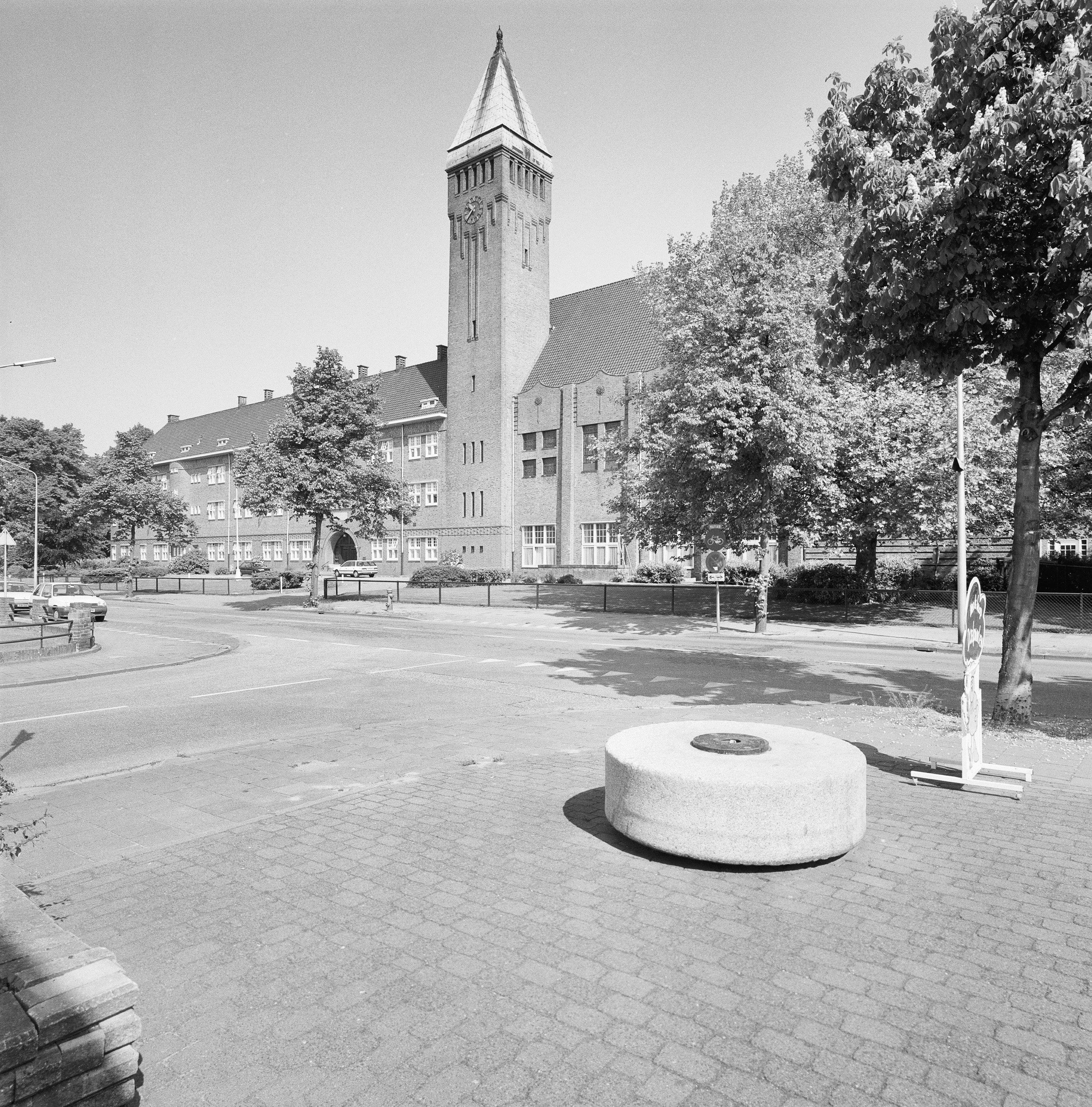
View from across the street

== See also ==
- Society of Jesus
- List of Jesuit sites in the Netherlands
