= Willy Dols =

Willy Dols (Sittard, 21 March 1911 – Schwesing, 5 November 1944) was a Dutch linguist, dialectologist and phonologist. He was the first one to make a profound study of the diphthongization which is typical for the Sittard dialect, in his dissertation which was not published until nine years after his death.

== Biography ==
Dols was a brilliant pupil of Jac. van Ginneken at the Katholieke Universiteit Nijmegen. He already made several publications during his study and graduated cum laude in 1938. Despite the crisis, people were searching several academic posts abroad (first in Estonia, then in Czechoslovakia) for him. After the breakout of the Second World War, however, these plans had to be given up.

During the first four years of the war, Dols worked as a teacher in his place of birth. In the meanwhile, he kept working on his dissertation for which he gathered the data. In August 1944, Dols had to flee to his sister in Arnhem because of the imminent Arbeitseinsatz. However, because of Operation Market Garden, he was also forced to flee from there.

On 28 September, Dols arrived in Putten where a raid by the Germans took place two days later. All men and boys were deported from the village, including Willy Dols. However, he could still entrust his almost-finished dissertation to the wife of Carel Beke, a future children's book's author, after having helped Beke and his family escaping from Arnhem.

Dols first arrived at the Neuengamme concentration camp, then he was transported to the Schwesing Concentration Camp, where 1500 people had been detained. After ten weeks of very bad treatment, Dols succumbed to dysentery.

After the war, his dissertation was prepared for the press with the support of the Royal Netherlands Academy of Arts and Sciences.
