= Oeffelt =

- Village
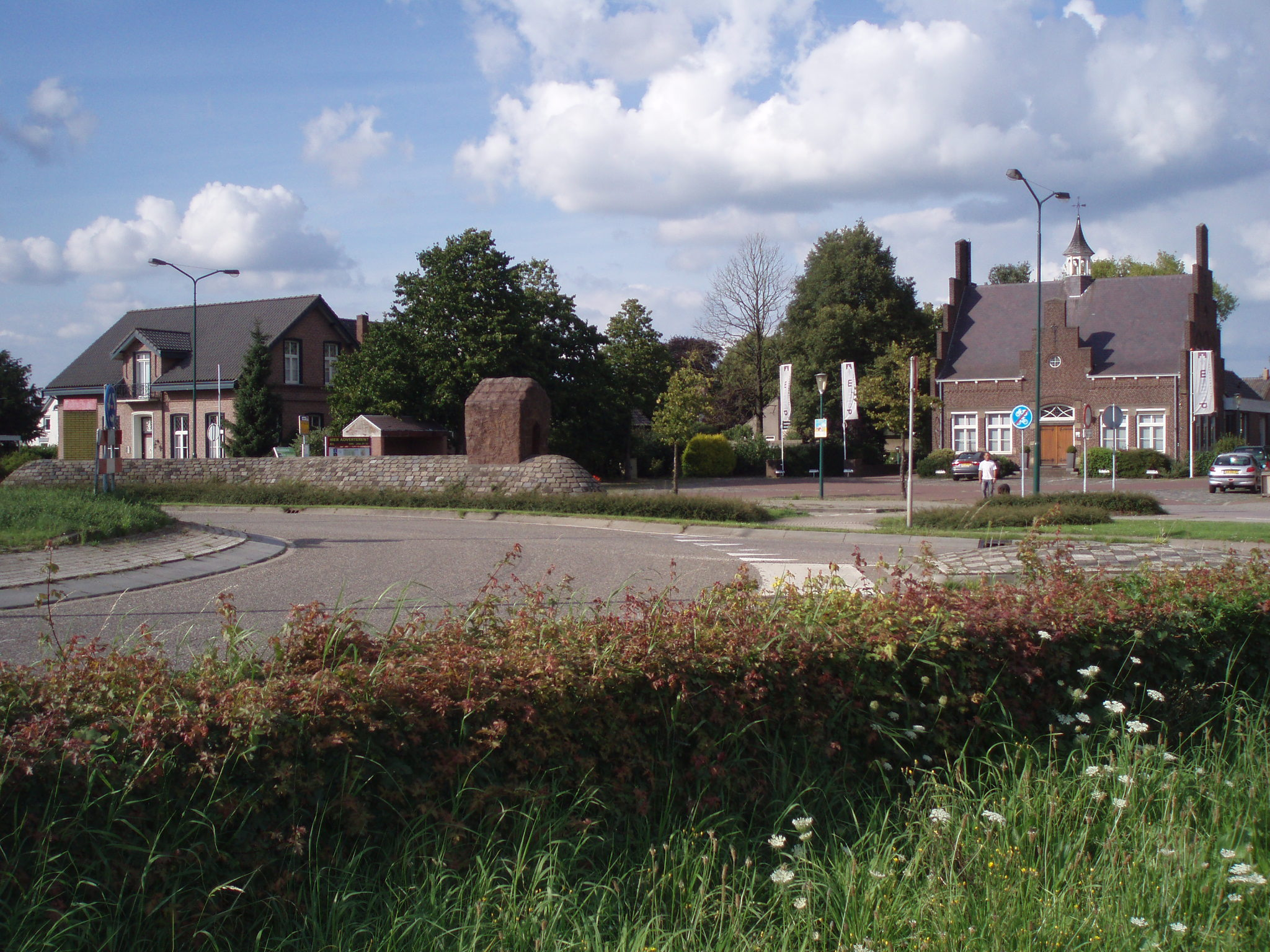
- Street view

- Flag Coat of arms

- Location in the province of North Brabant in the Netherlands Oeffelt (Netherlands)
- Coordinates: 51.6989°N 5.9319°E
- Country: Netherlands
- Province: North Brabant
- Municipality: Land van Cuijk

Area
  - Total: 9.69 km^{2} (3.74 sq mi)
- Elevation: 13 m (43 ft)

Population (2021)
  - Total: 2,370
  - Density: 245/km^{2} (633/sq mi)
- Time zone: UTC+1 (CET)
  - Summer (DST): UTC+2 (CEST)
- Postal code: 5441
- Dialing code: 0485

Oeffelt is a village in the Dutch province of North Brabant, about 5 km north of Boxmeer town and 6 km west of the border with the German state of North Rhine-Westphalia. Oeffelt lies on the west bank on the Meuse river with Gennep in the province of Limburg on the east bank. The villages are connected by a bridge in the N264 road.

== History ==
The settlement Oeffelt was first mentioned in a document in 1075 as Uflo, and means "open forest of the owl". Oeffelt developed in the 12th century on a river bank along the Meuse river. It used to belong to the Heren of Cuijk. Between 1441 and 1800, it was part of the Duchy of Cleves.

The Zoete Naam Jezus (Sweet name Jesus) church was built in 1954 to replace the St Salvator Church which was built by Pierre Cuypers in 1853, but destroyed in 1944 by war.

During the Thirty Years' War, Oeffelt was plundered by the Croatian mercenaries, and suffers an outbreak of the Plague in 1644. Only three families were left, however the village later recovered.

Oeffelt was home to 910 people in 1840. Oeffelt was a separate municipality until 1994, when it became part of Boxmeer. Since 2022 it has been part of the new municipality of Land van Cuijk.

== Gallery ==
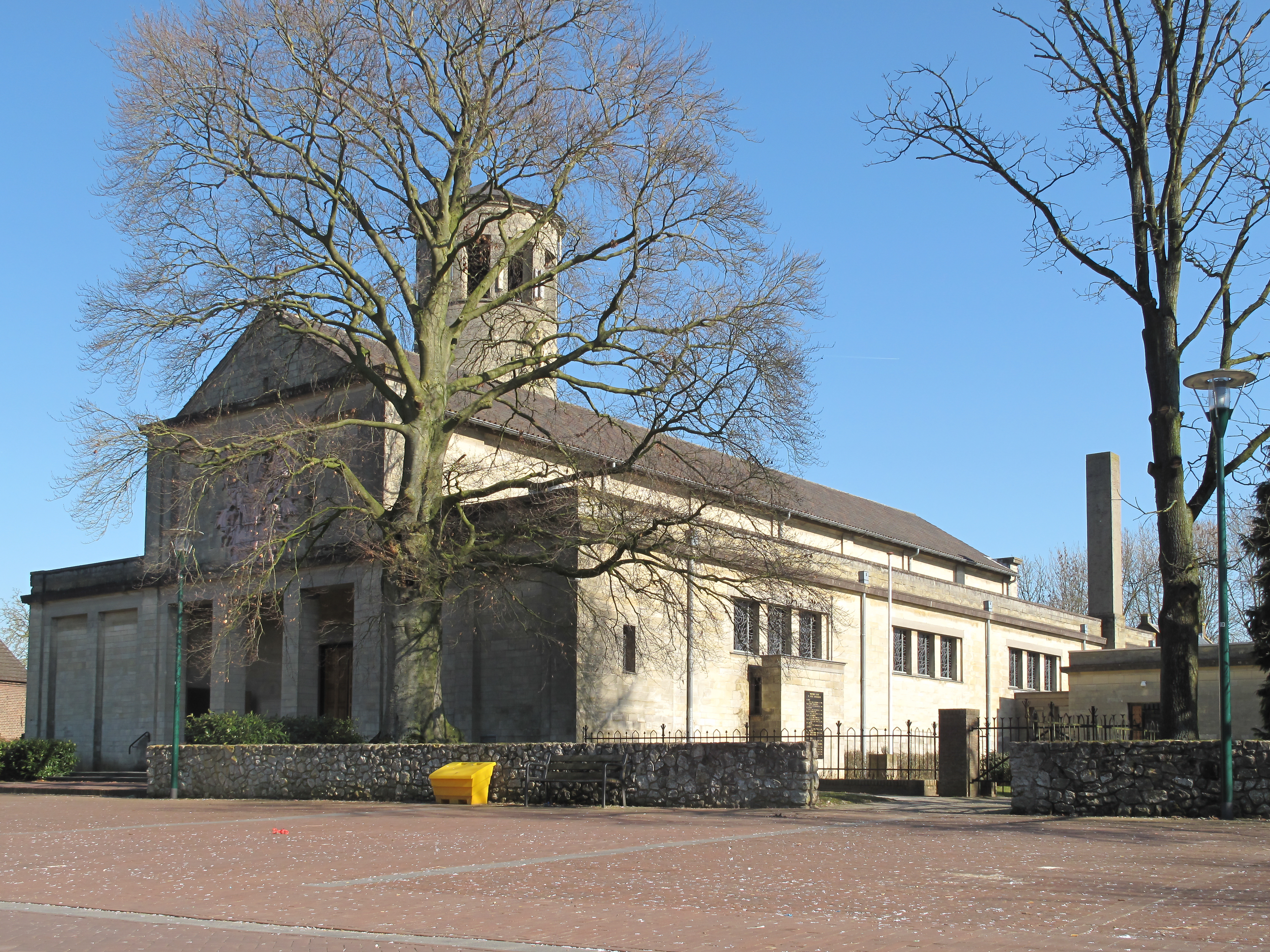
Oeffelt, church

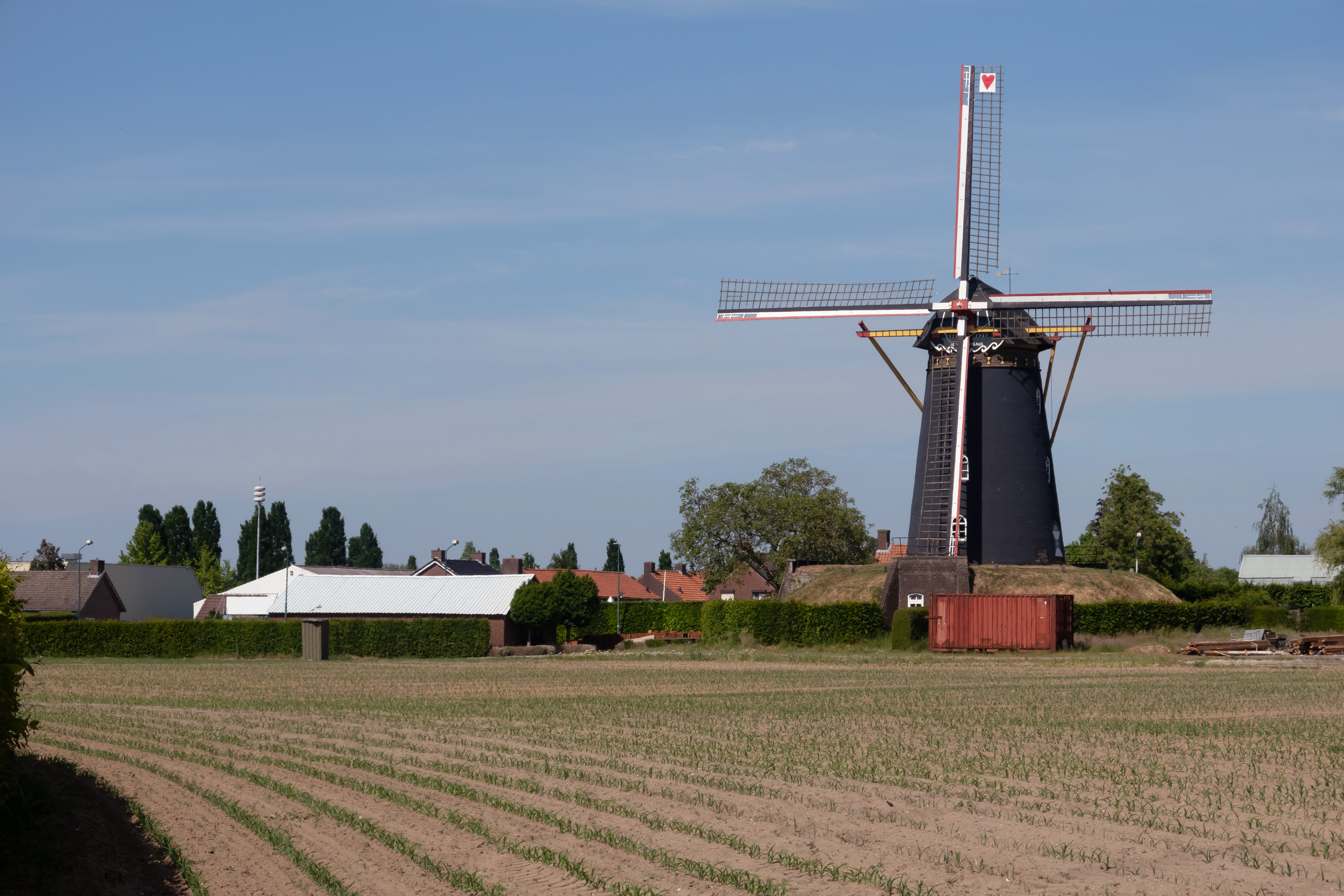
Oeffelt, windmill: molen de Vooruitgang

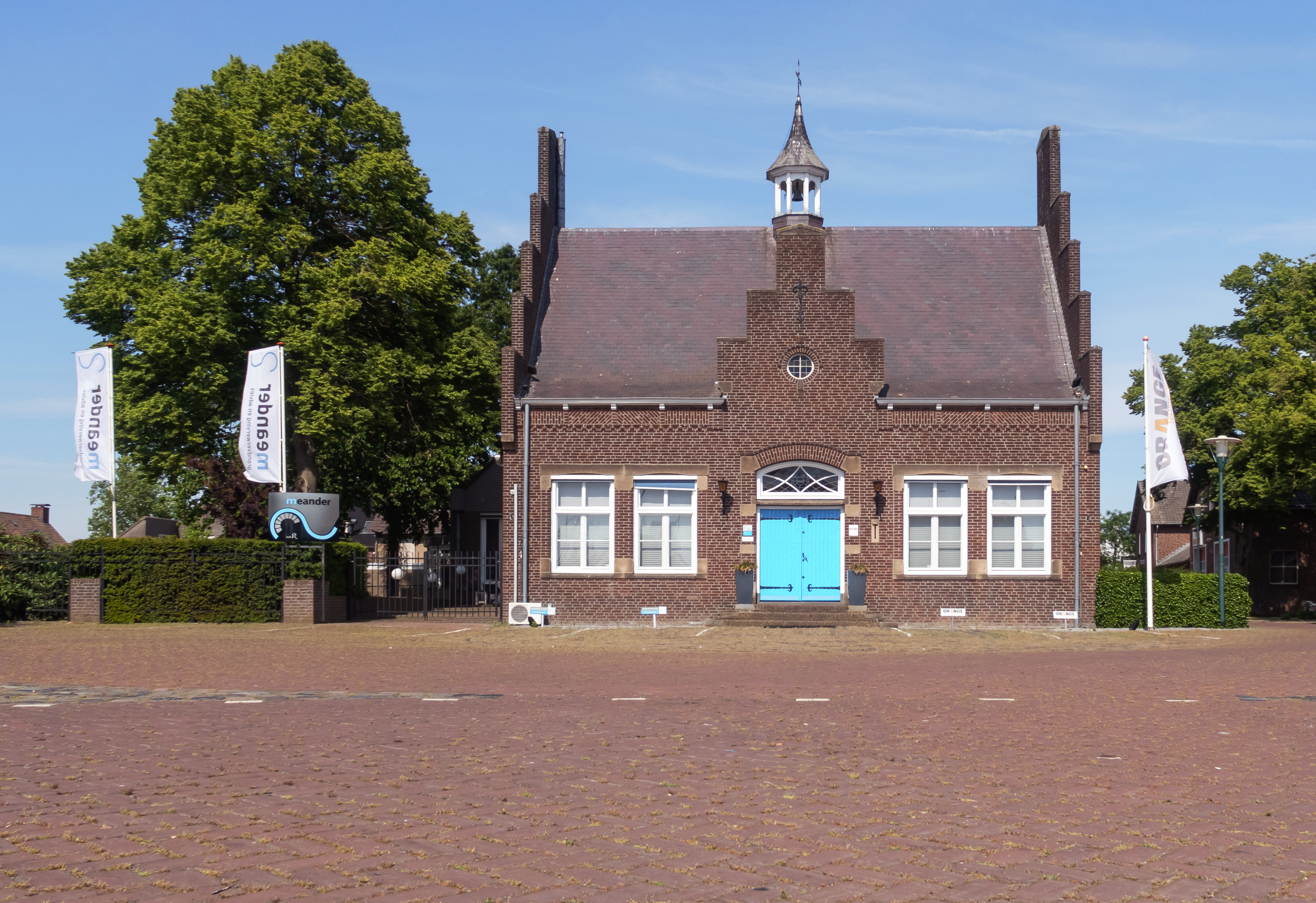
Oeffelt, monumental house

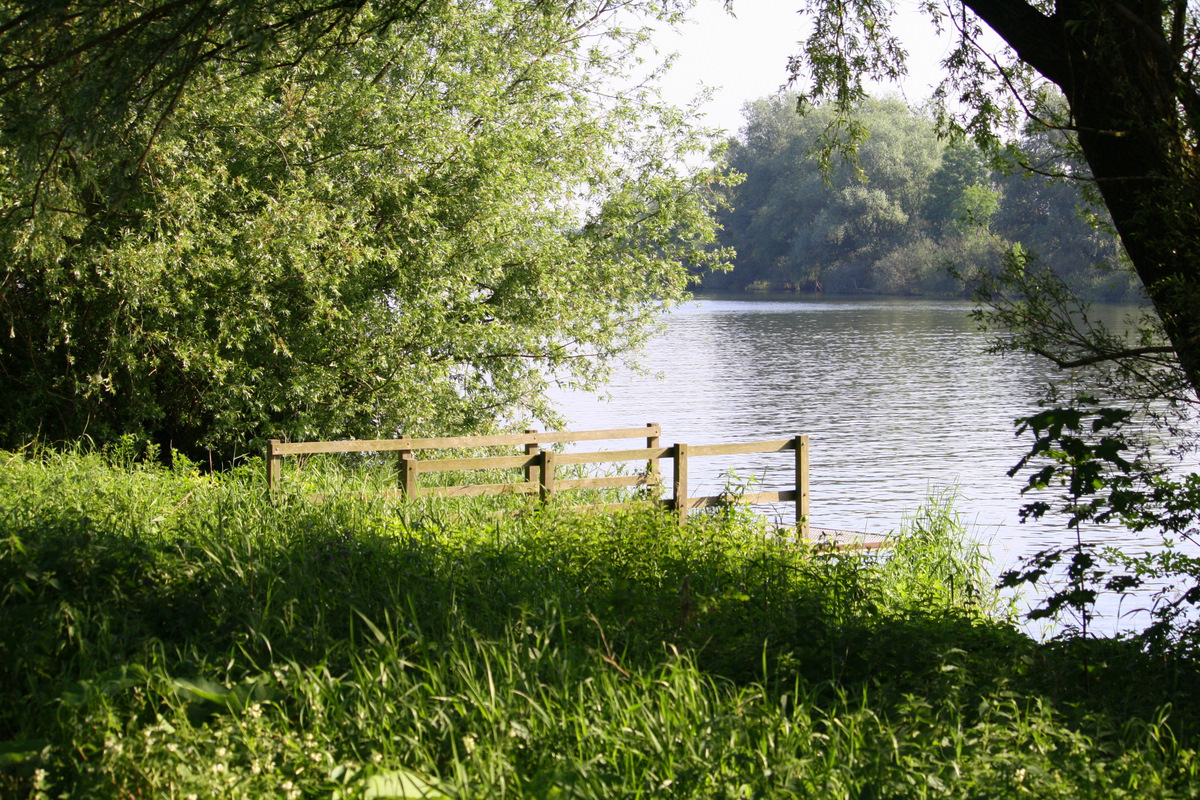
View on the Meuse
