= Munsterplein =

Coordinates: 51.1932°N 5.988°E

The Munstersquare (or Munsterplein in Dutch) is the main square in the city of Roermond. Its most prominent features are the bandstand and the Munster church (or "De Onze Lieve Vrouwe Munsterkerk" in Dutch), one of the most beautiful remnants of Romanesque architecture in the Netherlands. Next to the church is a statue of architect Pierre Cuypers, responsible for an extensive restoration of the church and also the designer of the bandstand. The south-east side of the square is closed by a block of houses designed by his son Joseph.

The square hosts a World War II monument which was revealed by queen Wilhelmina of the Netherlands in 1948. In the winter of 2023–2024 part of the square was covered for a multifunctional Christmas arena, which covered criticism for covering the "soul" of Roermond.
