= Frans-Andries Durlet =

Belgian architect, sculptor and printmaker

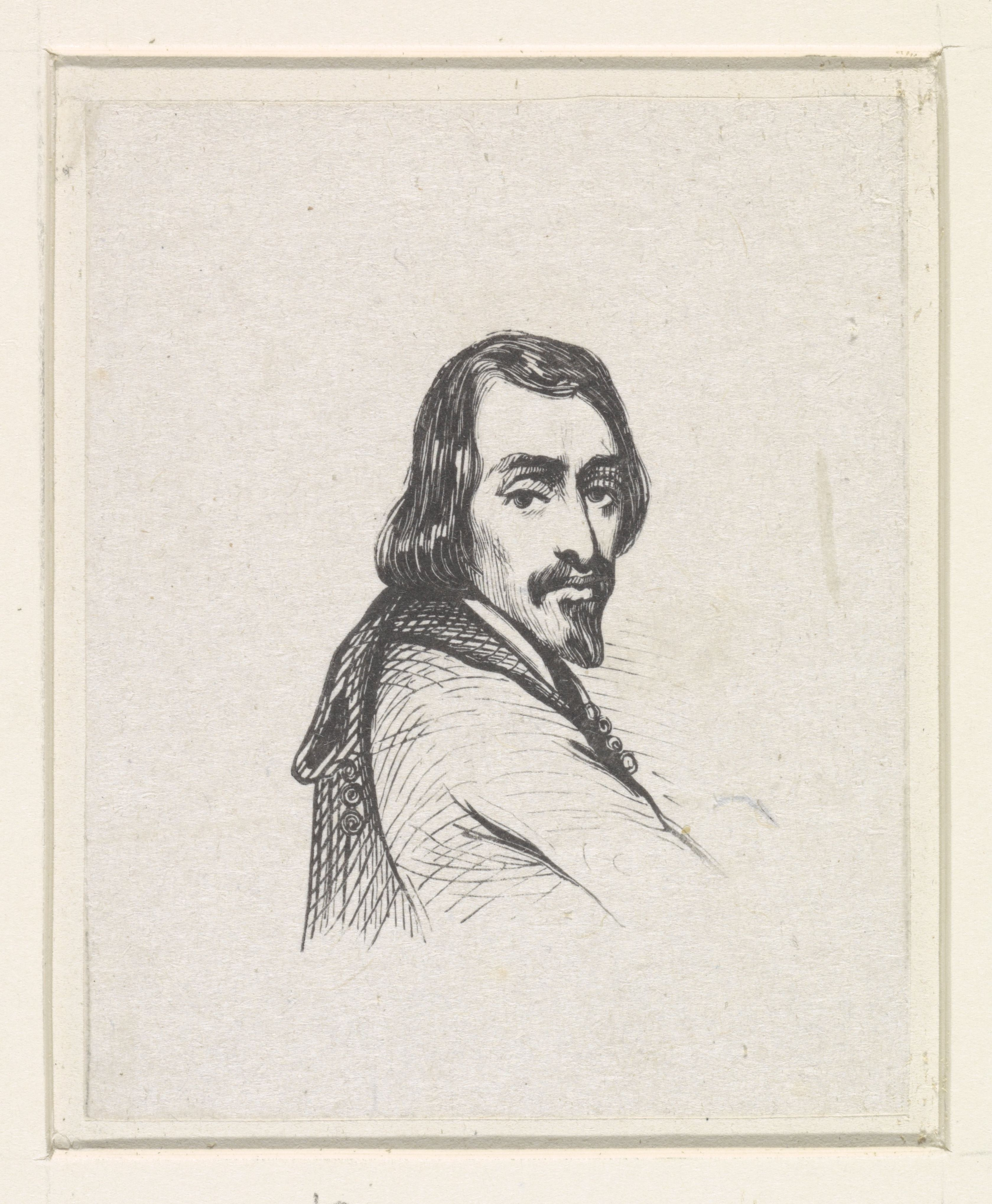
- Self-portrait
- Born: 11 July 1816; Antwerp
- Died: 2 March 1867 (aged 50); Antwerp
- Education: Royal Academy of Fine Arts Antwerp
- Known for: architecture, sculpture, printmaking

Frans-Andries aka François André or Franciscus Andreas Durlet, (11 July 1816 – 2 March 1867) was a Belgian architect, sculptor and printmaker.

Durlet was born and died in Antwerp. He taught at the Royal Academy of Fine Arts Antwerp and was a founding restorer of its Steen Museum. Pierre Cuypers was one of his students. He led the restoration works of the Cathedral of Our Lady in Antwerp and designed its choir stalls. He is considered a patron of Belgium's Gothic Revival architecture. The Durletstraat (Durlet street) in his native city is named in honor of him.

Durlet was married to Jeanne Steveniers (1826–1900). His son Frans (1855–1931) was also an architect, and his grandson Emmanuel became a well-known pianist and composer.

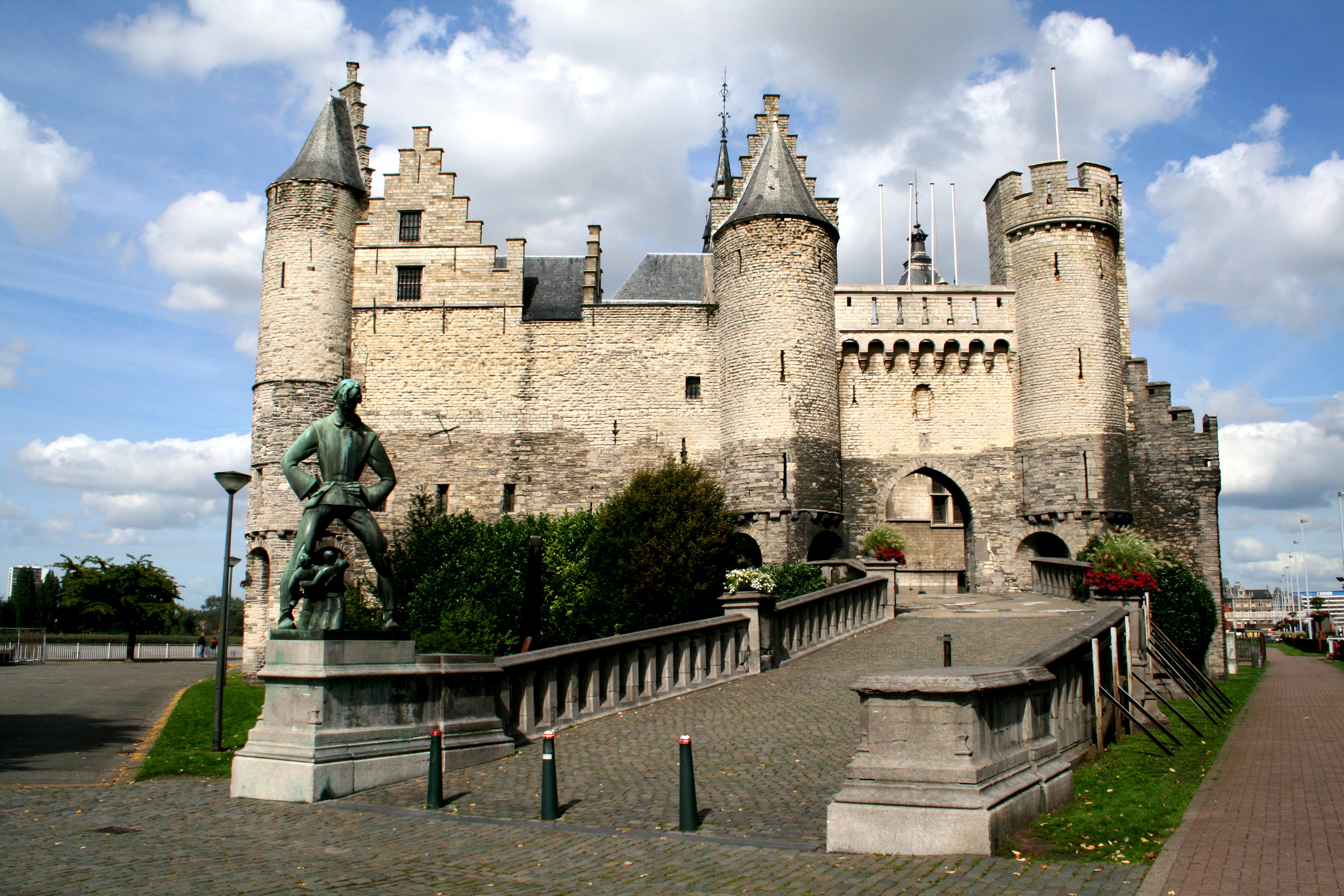
Het Steen, Antwerp

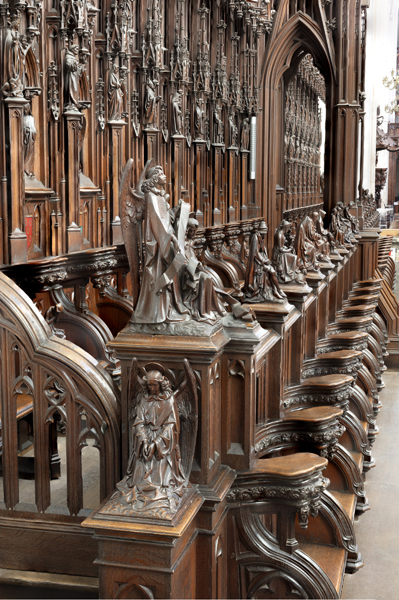
Choir, Cathedral of Our Lady (Antwerp)

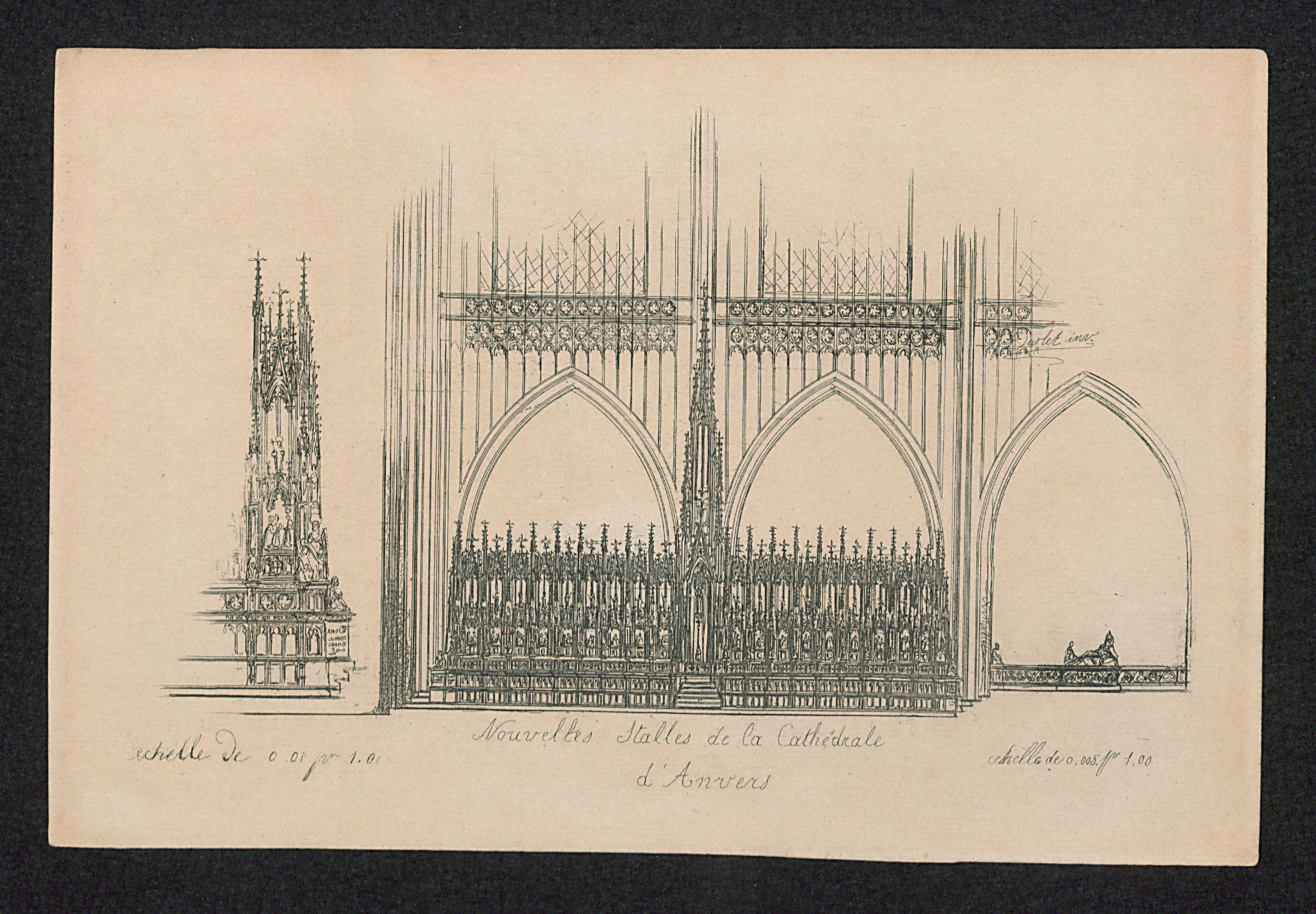
Choir, Cathedral of Our Lady (Antwerp)
