= Joseph Cuypers =

Dutch architect (1861–1949)

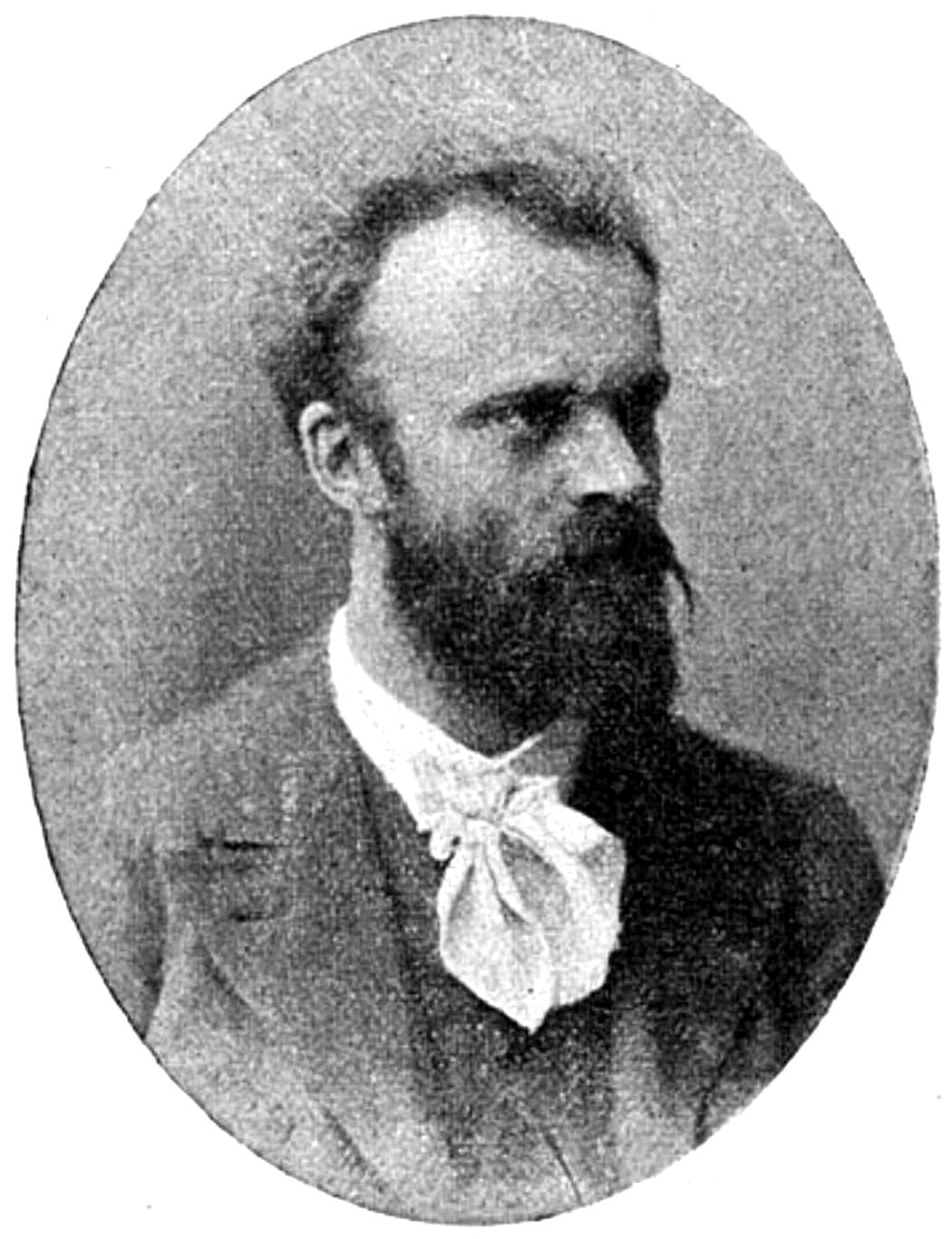
Joseph Cuypers (c. 1917)

Josephus Theodorus Joannes Cuypers (10 June 1861, Roermond – 20 January 1949, Meerssen) was a Dutch architect; primarily known for his Catholic churches.

== Life and work ==
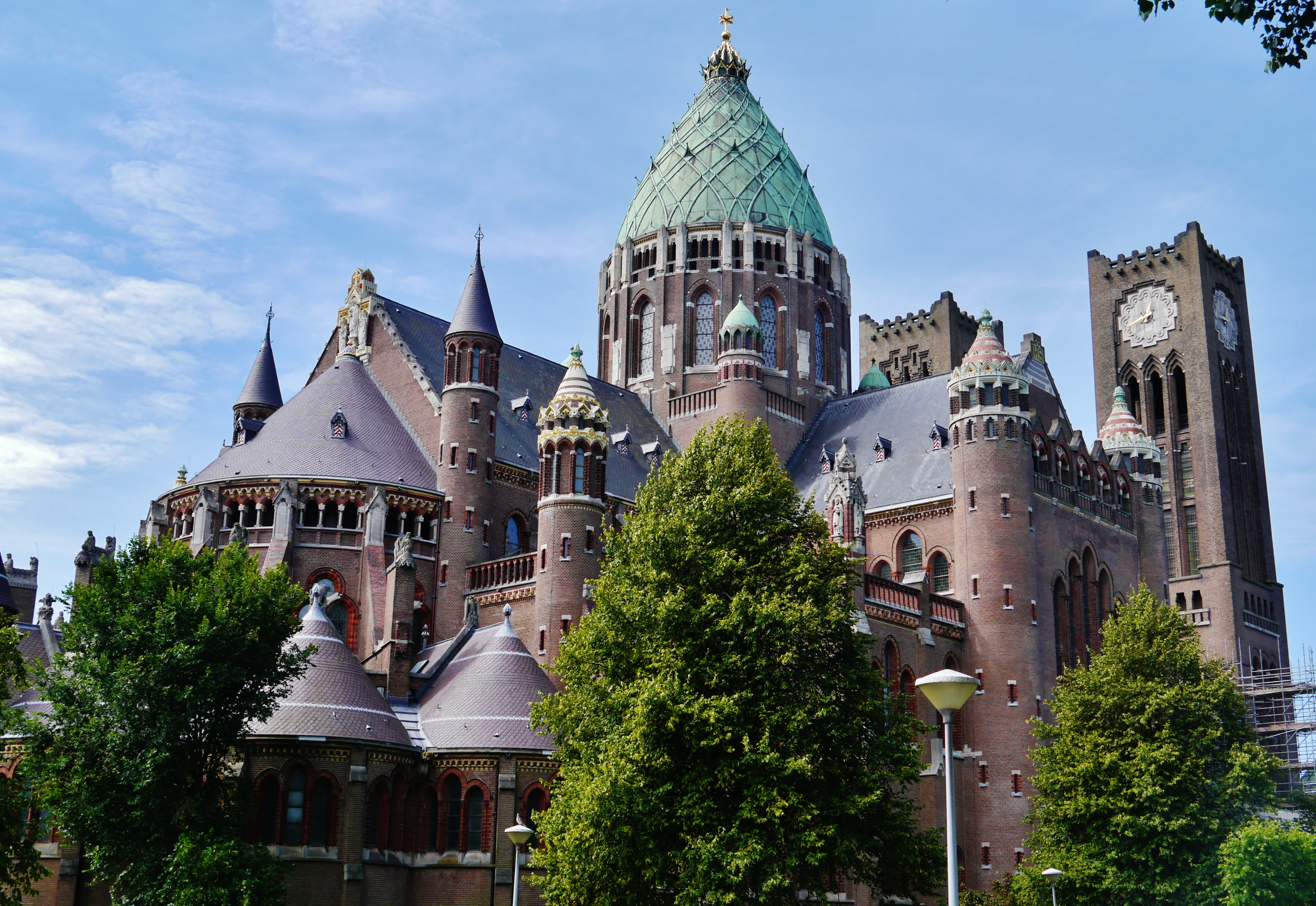
St. Bavo Cathedral, Haarlem

He was born to the architect, Pierre Cuypers, and his wife, Antoinette née Alberdingk Thijm. His training began at his father's firm. Later he studied at the Delft University of Technology, graduating in 1883, and becoming his father's assistant. The following year, he created his first work, a pension (guest house) on Vondelstraat. His first design for a church, Saint Urban's in Nes aan de Amstel, was completed in 1888. He also became involved in restorations, beginning with the Basilica of St Plechelm, in Oldenzaal. He married Delphine Marie Povel in 1889. They had three sons and two daughters. In 1893, he was commissioned to build the new Cathedral of St Bavo, Haarlem. The following year, he took over management of the family firm, when his father retired to Valkenburg aan de Geul. In 1898, he was selected to design another major project; St. Mary's Cathedral, in Rangoon (Yangon). His initial design incorporated Asian elements, but this was rejected in favor of a traditional Neo-Gothic style.

From 1900 to 1908, he worked with Jan Stuyt, at "De Violier", a Catholic-oriented architects' group. Under the influence of this group, and Stuyt, the public taste gradually changed from Neo-Gothic to Neo-Romanesque. He was also a member of several other associations, including Architectura et Amicitia, an offshoot of the artists' group, Arti et Amicitiae. Occasionally, he acted as a judge for their competitions, and served on committees; notably one delegated with helping to plan the Museumplein, a park with three museums and a concert hall. For a brief time, he served as Chairman of a Catholic trade union known as "Gildebond".

In 1908, his partnership with Stuyt was voluntarily terminated, when Stuyt expressed his intention to get married. He went back to working independently, rather than find a new partner. A relatively unproductive period followed, although he completed his largest secular project; the Amsterdam Stock Exchange.

Many years later, in 1920, he began working with his son, Pierre Cuypers jr., who had been employed by the French architect, Paul Bellot, and favored the Expressionist style. Together, they designed two domed churches in that style; in Beverwijk and Bussum. They also created more traditional designs, such as the Berchmanianum in Nijmegen. Another important project involved restoring the Basilica of the Holy Sacrament in Meerssen, which was accomplished from 1936 to 1938.

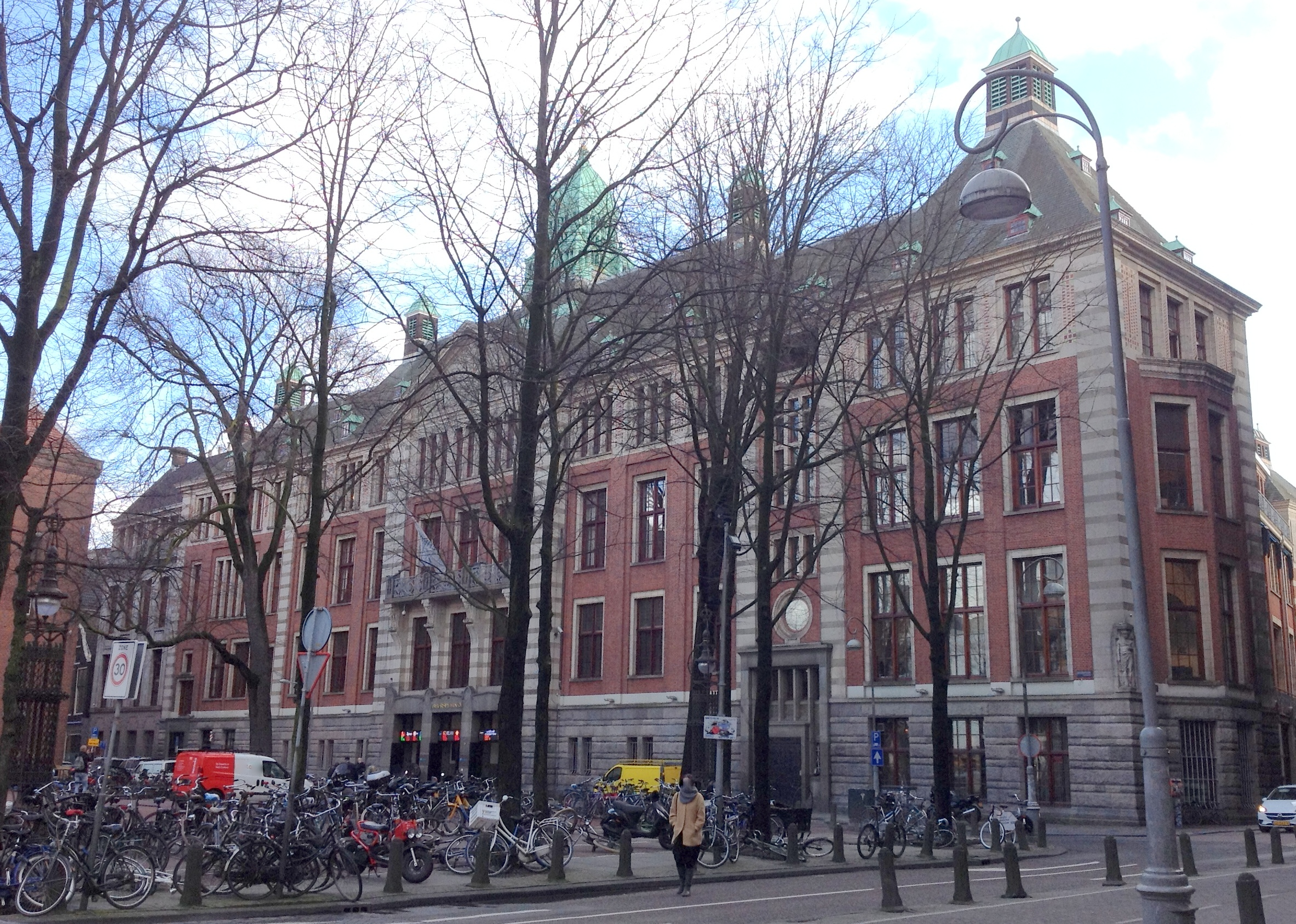
Amsterdam Stock Exchange

During World War II, in 1944, his home in Roermond was destroyed by a bomb. He went to live in the rectory at the Basilica, and remained there until his death in 1949, at the age of eighty-seven.
