= Koningsbosch =

- Village
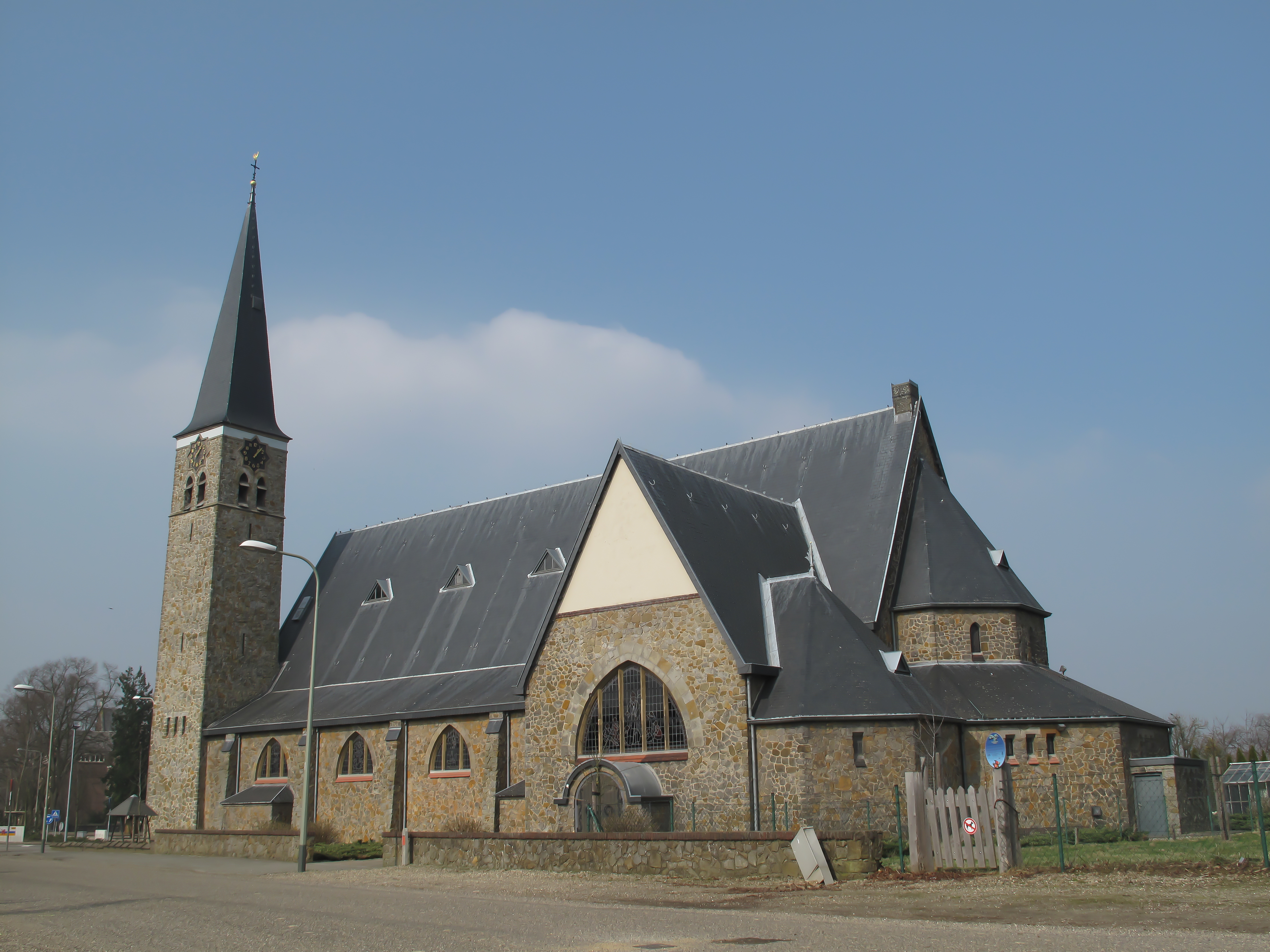
- Church of Koningsbosch

- Location in the Netherlands Location in the province of Limburg in the Netherlands
- Coordinates: 51°3′N 5°57′E
- Country: Netherlands
- Province: Limburg
- Municipality: Echt-Susteren

Area
  - Total: 15.21 km^{2} (5.87 sq mi)
- Elevation: 55 m (180 ft)

Population (2021)
  - Total: 1,655
  - Density: 108.8/km^{2} (281.8/sq mi)
- Time zone: UTC+1 (CET)
  - Summer (DST): UTC+2 (CEST)
- Postal code: 6104
- Dialing code: 0475
- Major roads: N274

Koningsbosch (Dutch pronunciation: [ˈkoːnɪŋzbɔs], Limburgish: De Boesj [də ˈbuːʃ]) is a village within the municipality of Echt-Susteren, in the Dutch province of Limburg. Koningsbosch is located next to the German border, approximately 10 kilometres east of the town of Echt.

The neighbourhood of Koningsbosch, which also includes the hamlets Echterbosch, Spaanshuisken, Aan Reijans and the surrounding countryside, covers an area of 0.27 km², has 1.711 inhabitants (as of 1 May 2005) and consists of some 700 houses. The village is slowly growing with the younger generation moving in and the recent construction of additional playgrounds and a community center.

== History ==
The name Koningsbosch, "King's Forest", dates back from the time of Charles V, Holy Roman Emperor. Charles V had some possessions in the region, including some forests, hence the name Koningsbosch.

In those days the forests were guarded by a Spanish forest keeper. The house he lived in was called Spaanshuisken, "Spanish House". The hamlet Spaanshuisken evolved around this house.

The parish of Koningsbosch was founded in 1861. The first priest was Petrus Antonius Kelleners. The first church was built in 1863, designed by the famous Dutch architect Pierre Cuypers. However, this church soon proved to be too small. Therefore, a new church was built by Cuypers' former employee Jan Stuyt in 1926. This church still exists today.

In 1873 a nunnery was built, which was abandoned in 1995. At the moment the nunnery, which has monumental status, is empty.

Until today the church and the nunnery dominate the skyline of Koningsbosch.

Patron Saint of the parish of Koningsbosch is Saint Godehard.

== Associations ==
The village of Koningsbosch has a thriving association culture. In 1992 the local shooting club (Schutterij St. Joseph) won the OLS. The local mixed choir Mes Amis became provincial champion in 1992 and 1993 and the local wood-wind and brass band (Harmonie St. Cecilia) became national champion in 1997. Successes of the local male choir "Koninklijk erkend mannenkoor St. Caecilia" are from earlier days. Periodically events are organised where various local associations perform together. In sept 2006 Mes Amis, the male choir and Harmonie St. Cecilia celebrated the 85th anniversary of the Harmonie in the Bürger-Treff in Waldfeucht, Germany. Every second week of December Mes Amis, the male choir, Harmonie St. Cecilia and the local church choir St. Caecilia perform together in a Christmas concert. Together with Maria Hoop, Koningsbosch is home to the football club Conventus '03.
