= Pierre Cuypers =

Dutch architect (1827–1921)

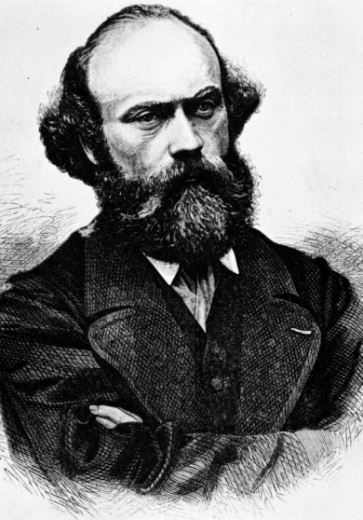
- Cuypers
- Born: Petrus Josephus Hubertus Cuypers; 16 May 1827; Roermond, Limburg, Netherlands
- Died: 3 March 1921 (aged 93); Roermond, Limburg, Netherlands
- Education: Royal Academy of Fine Arts (Antwerp)
- Occupation: Architect
- Awards: Royal Gold Medal (1897)
- Buildings: Rijksmuseum; Amsterdam Centraal station De Haar Castle

Petrus Josephus Hubertus "Pierre" Cuypers (16 May 1827 – 3 March 1921) was a Dutch architect, designer and restoration architect. A leading figure in nineteenth-century Dutch Gothic Revival architecture, he is best known for the Rijksmuseum and Amsterdam Centraal station in Amsterdam. Much of his career, however, was devoted to Roman Catholic churches, ecclesiastical furnishings and the restoration of historic monuments.

A catalogue of Cuypers's oeuvre records at least 94 churches, in addition to chapels, monasteries, schools, houses and other buildings. He also had a major role in the development of Dutch monument conservation, although his reconstructive approach to restoration later became controversial.

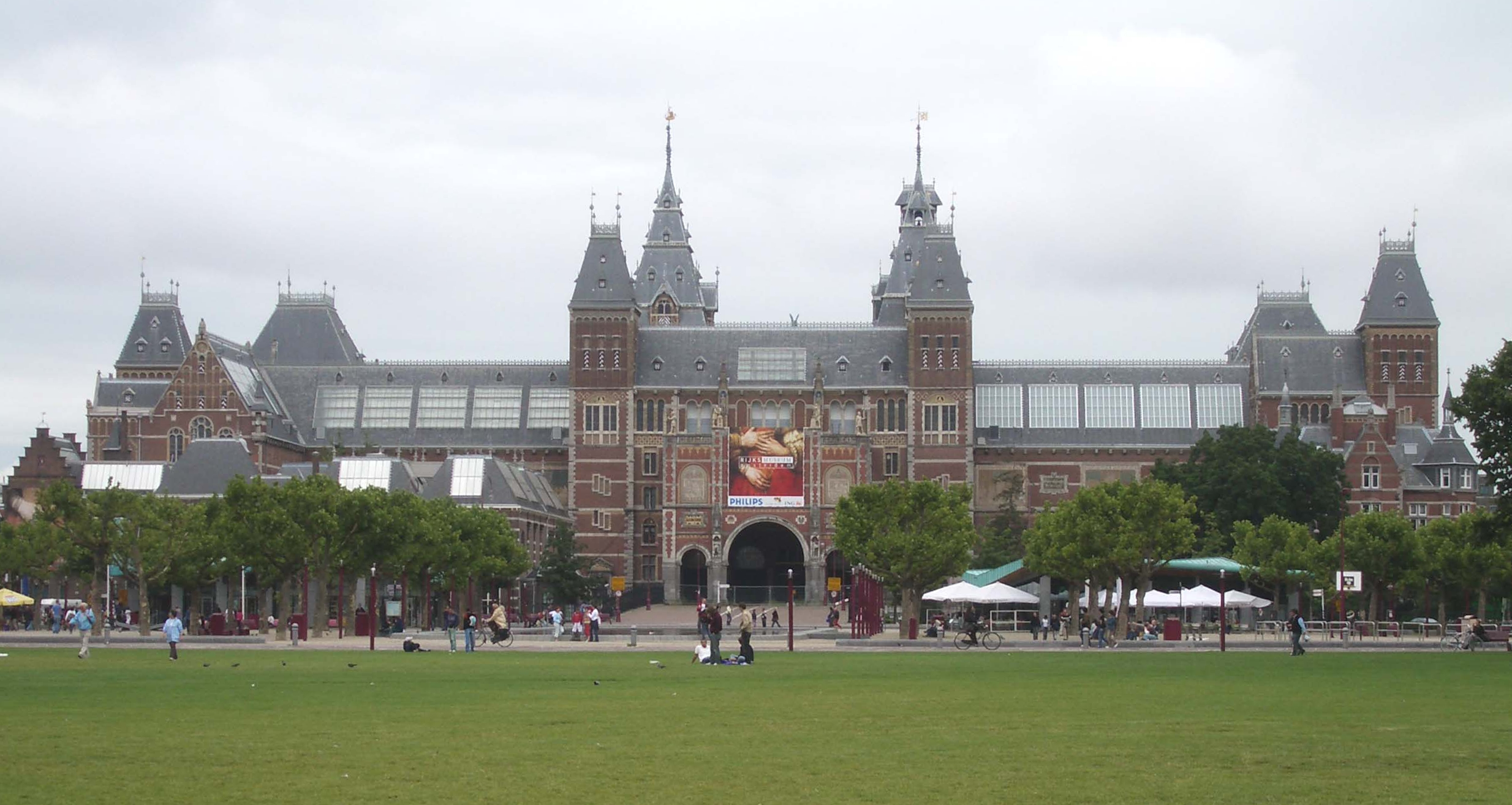
The Rijksmuseum, built between 1876 and 1885. Cuypers deliberately combined Gothic and Renaissance forms; in 1885, Max Rooses described the building as combining motifs from Gothic church architecture and Renaissance civic architecture.

== Early life and education ==
Cuypers was born in Roermond on 16 May 1827, the ninth and youngest child of Joannes Hubertus Cuypers and Maria Joanna Bex. His father was a house and church painter. After attending the Stedelijk College in Roermond, Cuypers went to Antwerp in 1844, aged seventeen, to study architecture at the Royal Academy of Fine Arts.

His teachers included Frans-Andries Durlet, Frans Stoop and Ferdinand Berckmans. In 1849 he received the academy's Prix d'Excellence. After his studies, Cuypers travelled through the German Rhineland, where he studied medieval architecture and saw the continuing construction of Cologne Cathedral. He returned to Roermond and was appointed municipal architect there in 1851.

== Workshop and early career ==
In the early 1850s Cuypers established a business for ecclesiastical art in Roermond with the manufacturer François Stoltzenberg. Sources differ slightly in dating the enterprise: accounts place its establishment in 1852 or describe the formal Cuypers–Stoltzenberg firm as beginning in 1853. The workshops produced sculpture, wall painting, stained glass, church furniture, metalwork and other decorative elements, allowing Cuypers to design churches and their interiors as integrated ensembles.

In 1853 he built a combined house and workshop complex in Roermond. The complex, later enlarged and altered, survives as the Cuypershuis museum.

== Architecture ==
=== Structural Gothic and church architecture ===
Cuypers's early ecclesiastical work was strongly influenced by thirteenth-century French Gothic architecture. His architectural thought was also shaped by Eugène Viollet-le-Duc and by his close association with the Catholic writer and art theorist J. A. Alberdingk Thijm.

His first church was the Roman Catholic St Salvator Church at Oeffelt, built in 1853–1854 and destroyed during the Second World War in 1944. At Oeffelt Cuypers experimented with masonry rib vaults. He developed the approach on a substantially larger scale at the Sint-Lambertuskerk (Veghel) in Veghel, built in 1858–1862, which is generally regarded as his first important church with brick vaulting. The Veghel church was explicitly based on thirteenth-century French Gothic precedents, and its furnishings were largely produced by the Cuypers and Stoltzenberg workshop.

The use of actual masonry vaults rather than lightweight imitations reflected Cuypers's interest in the structural principles of medieval Gothic architecture rather than its decoration alone. This structurally oriented approach became an important feature of his Gothic Revival work.

Other important early churches included the Sint-Catharinakerk (Eindhoven) in Eindhoven (1859–1867). From the mid-1860s onward, Cuypers increasingly supplemented French High Gothic precedents with Dutch and other regional medieval traditions and developed a more individual architectural language.

Not all his churches were Gothic. At Oudenbosch he directed construction of the Basilica of Saints Agatha and Barbara between 1865 and 1880. At the request of its patron, the church was modelled on St. Peter's Basilica in Rome on a reduced scale; its later façade, completed under G. J. van Swaay in 1892, was modelled on St John Lateran.

=== Amsterdam and the Vondelstraat ===
Cuypers moved to Amsterdam in 1865, where his connections with Alberdingk Thijm and other Catholic intellectuals provided access to a wider national network of patrons.

He also became directly involved in urban development. In 1864 he had bought a property near the recently created Vondelpark. In 1866 he submitted a plan for a picturesque villa development beside the park. Amsterdam's municipal authorities instead required a conventional straight street, resulting in a compromise with detached and semi-detached villas along the park side and continuous urban houses on the opposite side. Cuypers participated as landowner, developer and architect and designed several of the houses himself.

The Vondelkerk formed the architectural focus of the development. Cuypers made a design for the church in 1867; the first stone was laid on 1 March 1872, a first section came into use in June 1873, and the completed church was consecrated in 1880. It was the first free-standing Roman Catholic church constructed in Amsterdam since the Middle Ages. The building was severely damaged by fire on 1 January 2026.

=== Rijksmuseum ===
Cuypers won the commission for the new Rijksmuseum in Amsterdam in 1876. Construction began that year and the museum opened in 1885.

The design combined Gothic and Renaissance forms rather than adhering exclusively to either style. Cuypers was particularly interested in Netherlandish architecture of the transition between the late Gothic and Renaissance periods, in which Renaissance ornament could coexist with largely Gothic construction.

The mixture was recognised by contemporary observers. In 1885, Belgian art historian Max Rooses described Cuypers as having combined the principal motifs of Gothic church architecture with those of Renaissance civic architecture. Rooses associated the towers and large circular windows particularly with the Gothic component, while rectangular windows, roofs and dormers represented the Renaissance component.

The design was controversial. Critics objected that the executed museum appeared too Gothic, medieval or Roman Catholic for a national museum, despite its Renaissance elements. Cuypers also designed associated museum buildings and became closely involved with the architectural and educational institutions established around the museum.

=== Amsterdam Centraal ===
Cuypers subsequently designed the principal building of Amsterdam Centraal station with engineer and architect A. L. van Gendt. The station was built on artificial islands in the IJ, and its foundations required 8,687 piles. Construction of the monumental station building occupied much of the 1880s, and the station opened on 15 October 1889.

The station's large central block was conceived as a monumental gateway through which railway passengers entered Amsterdam. As at the Rijksmuseum, architecture, sculpture and decorative art were combined within an extensive historicising programme.

== Restoration work ==
Restoration and conservation formed a major part of Cuypers's practice. He was appointed in 1874 to the newly established College of Government Advisers for Monuments of History and Art and later held several influential governmental posts relating to architecture and monuments.

His projects included the Munsterkerk in Roermond, Rolduc Abbey, the Basilica of Saint Servatius in Maastricht, Mainz Cathedral in Germany, De Haar Castle near Utrecht, and numerous other medieval churches and civic monuments.

=== Restoration philosophy ===
Cuypers's restoration practice has long been controversial. Influenced in part by Viollet-le-Duc, he sometimes sought an architecturally coherent reconstructed state rather than simply retaining every alteration accumulated during a building's history. This could involve removing later work and reconstructing missing elements according to his interpretation of the monument's original architectural system.

His practice was not uniformly reconstructive, however, and became more cautious over time. During discussion of the leaning tower of the Oude Kerk in Delft in 1897, Cuypers argued for retaining as much original masonry as possible and stated that restoration should, so far as practicable, consist of preservation rather than renewal.

This tension between architectural reconstruction and conservation became important in later Dutch debates about monument preservation. The monument-conservation principles adopted in the early twentieth century increasingly rejected restoration to a hypothetical ideal state.

=== Munsterkerk ===
The Munsterkerk in Roermond was among Cuypers's earliest major restoration projects. He first became involved around 1850 and continued to work on the church for decades. His interventions substantially changed its appearance, including the reconstruction and alteration of its towers and the removal of later elements, eventually producing the four-towered silhouette now associated with the church.

The project became a prominent example of Cuypers's attempt to restore a monument according to what he considered its underlying stylistic and structural logic.

=== Mainz Cathedral ===
Cuypers was appointed Dombaumeister of Mainz Cathedral on 23 September 1873 and remained in that position until 1 August 1879. His work there included reconstruction of the crypt and substantial work on the eastern end and eastern tower, which he reshaped in Romanesque Revival forms based on his interpretation of the cathedral's earlier state.

=== De Haar ===
One of Cuypers's largest later projects was the reconstruction and restoration of De Haar Castle at Haarzuilens. Under his direction the surviving medieval castle was restored and partly rebuilt between 1892 and 1912 in Gothic Revival and Renaissance Revival forms, making extensive use of surviving medieval masonry.

The commission extended beyond the castle itself. Cuypers designed or supervised elaborate interiors and participated in the creation of the park, gardens and reconstructed village environment; the village church was also restored and partly rebuilt. His son Joseph Cuypers was responsible for much of the day-to-day supervision of the reconstruction.

== Government work, teaching and later designs ==
Cuypers's influence extended beyond his private architectural practice. From the 1870s he held government architectural responsibilities associated with national museum buildings and monument conservation. In 1903 he became chairman of the newly created Rijkscommissie tot het opmaken en uitgeven van een Inventaris en eene Beschrijving van de Nederlandsche monumenten van Geschiedenis en Kunst, which was charged with inventorying and describing monuments throughout the Netherlands.

In 1918, when the Dutch system of state monument conservation was reorganised, Cuypers became chairman of the newly established national monument commission.

Cuypers also taught medieval art history at the Rijkschool voor Kunstnijverheid and the Rijksnormaalschool voor Teekenonderwijzers in Amsterdam. His son Joseph succeeded him in those teaching posts in 1890.

His design activity was not limited to buildings. During the renovation of the Ridderzaal in The Hague, Cuypers designed a new Neo-Gothic interior and the throne installed there in 1904. The throne subsequently became associated with the annual Speech from the Throne on Prinsjesdag.

== Family and personal life ==
Cuypers married Rosalia van de Vin of Antwerp in 1850. They had two daughters; Rosalia and their younger daughter died of tuberculosis in 1855.

In 1859 he married Antoinette "Nenny" Alberdingk Thijm, sister of J. A. Alberdingk Thijm. Their children included Joseph Cuypers, who became an architect and increasingly collaborated with his father from the 1880s onward.

Cuypers's nephew Eduard Cuypers also trained in his architectural practice before establishing his own office in Amsterdam in 1881. Later architect members of the family included Cuypers's grandson Pierre Cuypers Jr.

Cuypers left Amsterdam in 1894. Sources differ over his principal residence immediately afterward. A Municipality of Amsterdam account describes him as returning to Roermond, while research based on the Valkenburg population register records him as resident in Valkenburg from 1894 to 1898.

Cuypers was a practising Roman Catholic and belonged to the Dominican lay order. Architectural historian Wies van Leeuwen has stated that he was buried in the habit of the Dominican lay order.

He died in Roermond on 3 March 1921 at the age of 93 and was buried in the family grave at the Oude Kerkhof.

== Selected works ==
Selected buildings, restorations and designs
Work	Location	Date	Notes
St Salvator Church	Oeffelt, Netherlands	1853–1854	Cuypers's first church and an early experiment with masonry rib vaulting. Destroyed by wartime violence in 1944.
Sint-Lambertuskerk (Veghel)	Veghel, Netherlands	1858–1862	Cuypers's first major church based on thirteenth-century French Gothic architecture; its interior has brick rib vaults.
Sint-Catharinakerk (Eindhoven)	Eindhoven, Netherlands	1859–1867	Major early Gothic Revival church.
Basilica of Saints Agatha and Barbara	Oudenbosch, Netherlands	1865–1880	Built on a reduced scale after St Peter's Basilica in Rome. The present façade was added under G. J. van Swaay in 1892.
Vondelkerk	Amsterdam, Netherlands	1872–1880	Cuypers made an initial design in 1867; the completed church was consecrated in 1880. Severely damaged by fire on 1 January 2026.
Southern abutment of the Nijmegen railway bridge	Nijmegen, Netherlands	1879	Cuypers designed the monumental southern architectural abutment; the engineering bridge itself was not his design.
Rijksmuseum	Amsterdam, Netherlands	1876–1885	National museum combining Gothic and Renaissance forms; opened in 1885.
Amsterdam Centraal station	Amsterdam, Netherlands	1880s–1889	Designed with A. L. van Gendt and opened on 15 October 1889.
St Joseph's Church	Groningen, Netherlands	1886–1887	Designed by Pierre and Joseph Cuypers; later became the cathedral of Groningen.
De Haar Castle	Haarzuilens, Netherlands	1892–1912	Extensive restoration and partial reconstruction of the medieval castle as part of a larger estate project.
St Martinus Church	Groningen, Netherlands	1895	Roman Catholic church later used as the cathedral of Groningen; demolished in 1982.
Ridderzaal interior and throne	The Hague, Netherlands	1904	Cuypers redesigned the Ridderzaal interior and designed the Neo-Gothic throne used for the annual Speech from the Throne.

== Honours and influence ==
Cuypers received the Royal Gold Medal of the Royal Institute of British Architects in 1897. The medal was presented to him at a RIBA meeting on 28 June that year.

By 1897 he was also a Commander of the Order of the Netherlands Lion, an officer of the Legion of Honour, and a commander of the Order of Isabella the Catholic, and had received an honorary doctorate from Utrecht University.

Cuypers's offices also served as a training ground for younger architects and designers. K. P. C. de Bazel worked in his office during the formative years of his career; H. P. Berlage later suggested that De Bazel's time there contributed to his ability to conceive architecture and its details as a complete design. De Bazel and J. L. M. Lauweriks were both working in Cuypers's office around the mid-1890s.

Cuypers also influenced architects who did not train directly under him. Hendrik Petrus Berlage regarded the structural logic of Cuypers's Gothic architecture and his emphasis on the truthful use of materials as an important step toward modern architecture, while rejecting Cuypers's continued dependence on historical forms and ornament.

Cuypers's work was highly contentious during his lifetime. Roman Catholic supporters regarded him as an important architect of Catholic cultural revival, while some liberal and Protestant critics associated his Gothic Revival architecture with Catholic political and cultural ambitions. During much of the twentieth century, nineteenth-century ecclesiastical architecture fell from favour and a number of his churches and interiors were demolished or substantially altered.

A renewed interest in nineteenth-century architecture and conservation emerged during the later twentieth century. The Cuypersgenootschap, founded in 1984, took its name from him and became active in protecting nineteenth- and twentieth-century architectural heritage.

Cuypers's former home and workshops in Roermond are preserved as the Cuypershuis museum.

== Cuypers Year ==
In 2007, the 180th anniversary of Cuypers's birth, Roermond declared a Cuypersjaar ("Cuypers Year"). The commemorative programme extended into 2008 and included exhibitions, publications, lectures, symposia and guided tours in several Dutch cities.

Major exhibitions were held in Roermond and at the Netherlands Architecture Institute in Rotterdam and Maastricht. The period also saw publication of major new studies and a comprehensive catalogue of Cuypers's architectural work.

== Gallery ==
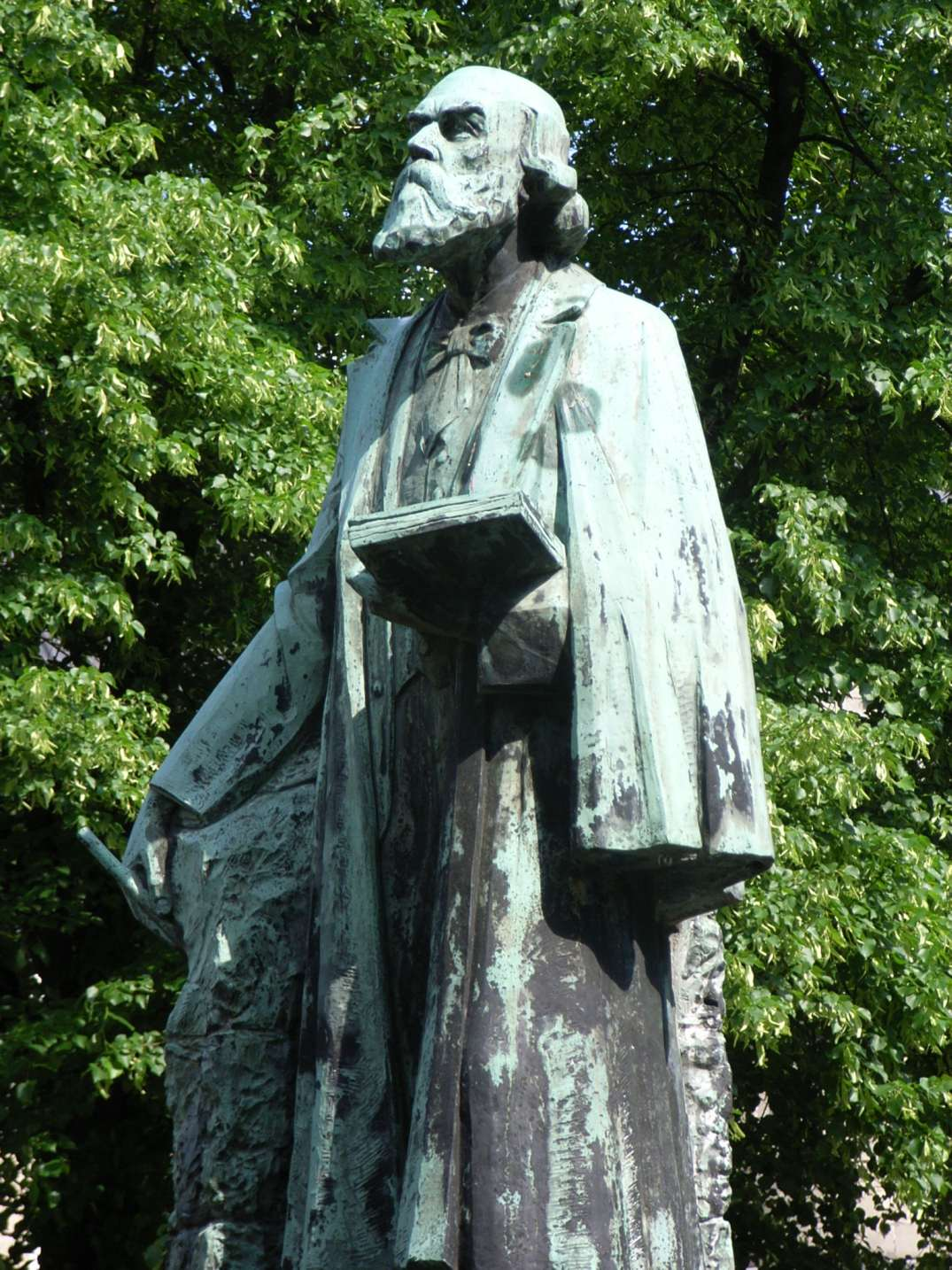
Monument to Cuypers by August Falise, Munsterplein, Roermond

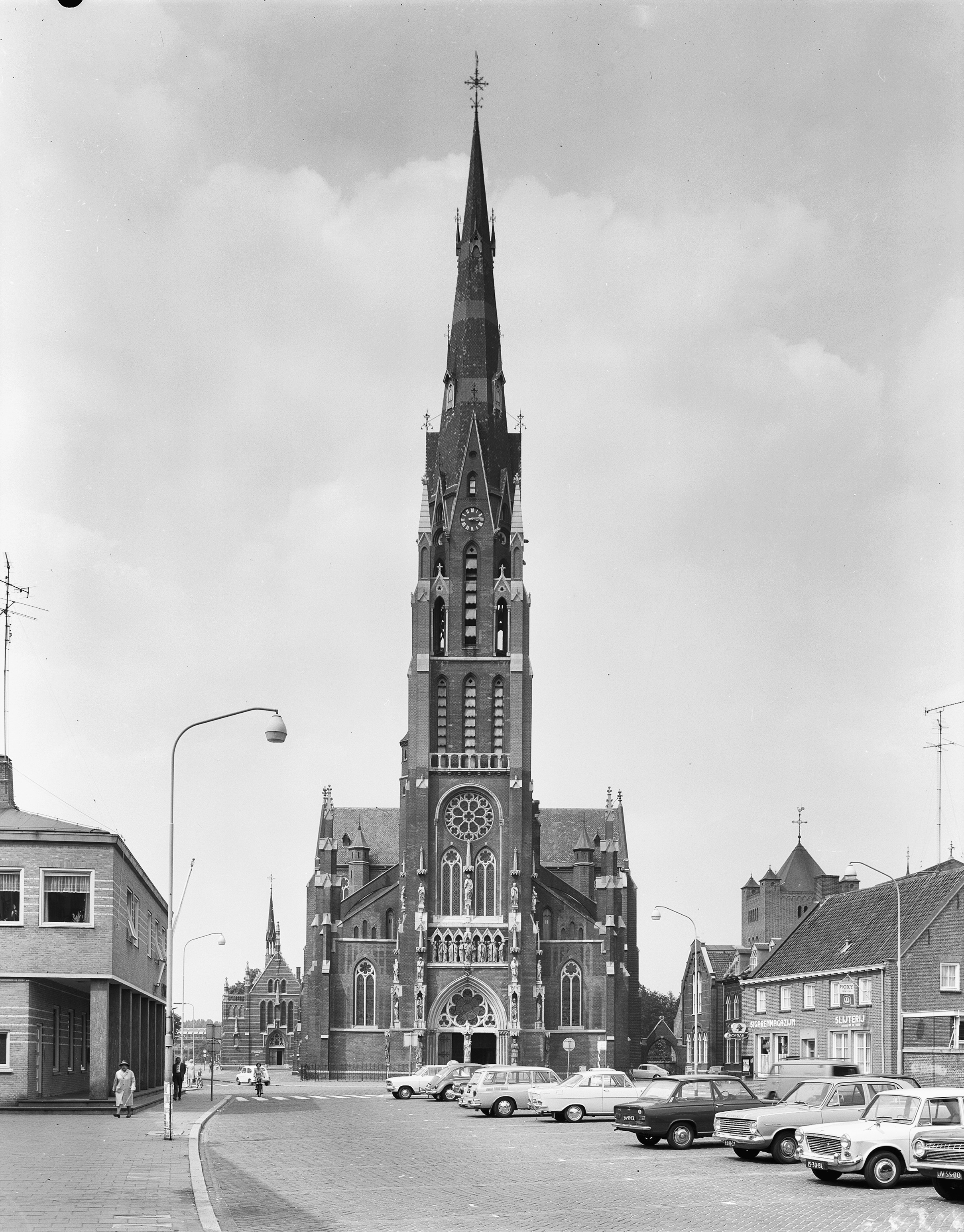
Sint-Lambertuskerk (Veghel), Veghel

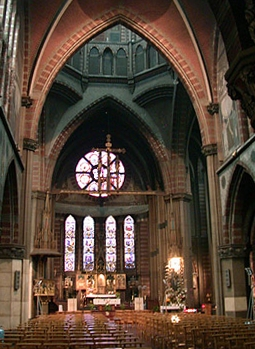
Sint-Antonius van Paduaklooster (Brussel), Brussels

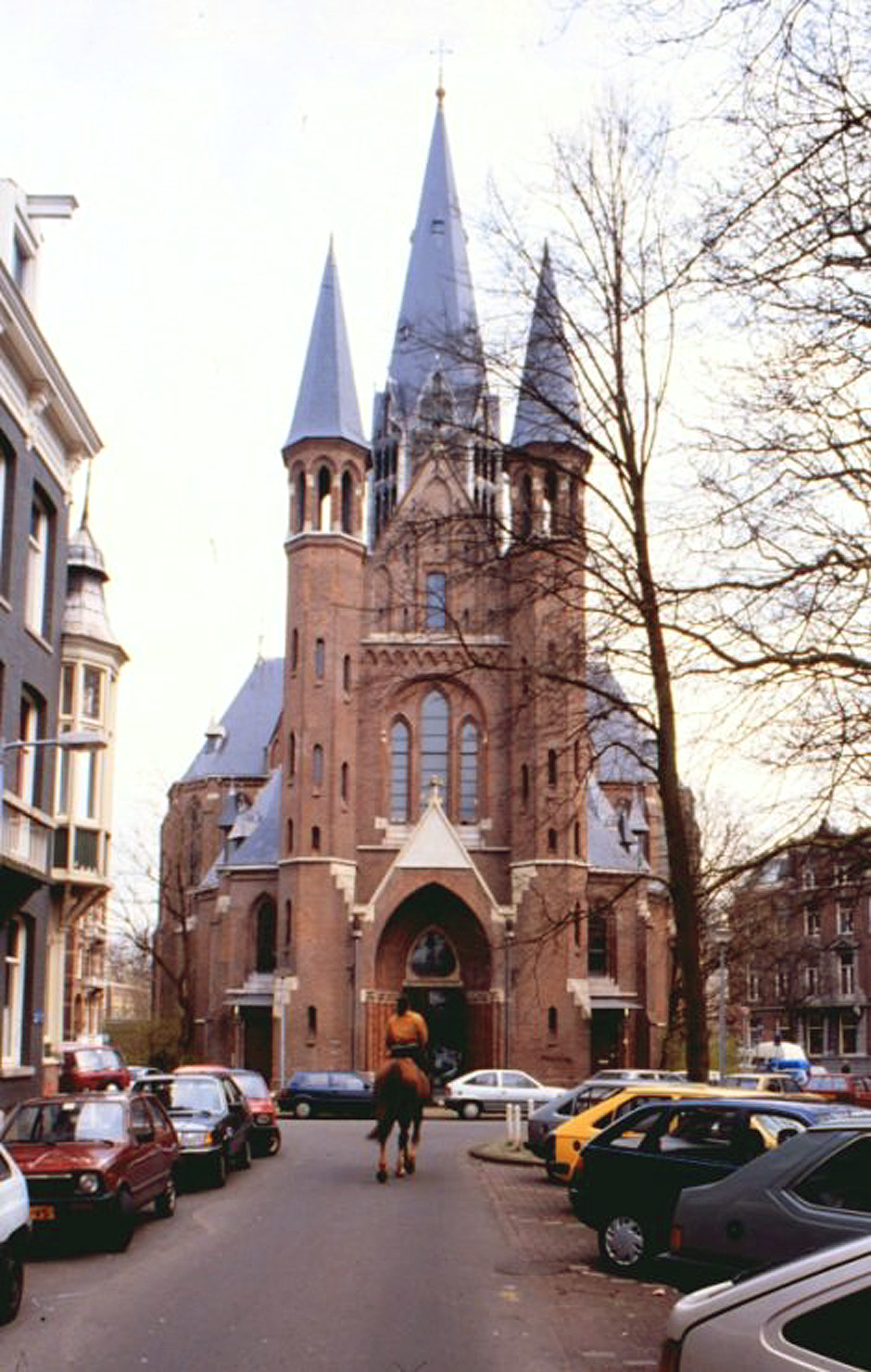
Vondelkerk, Amsterdam, completed in 1880 and severely damaged by fire in 2026

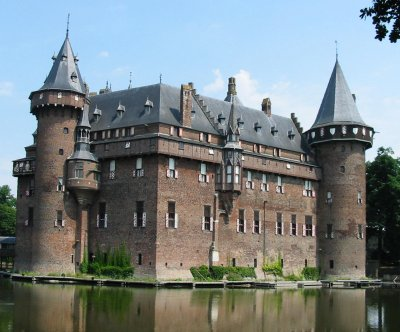
De Haar Castle, restored and partly rebuilt under Cuypers between 1892 and 1912

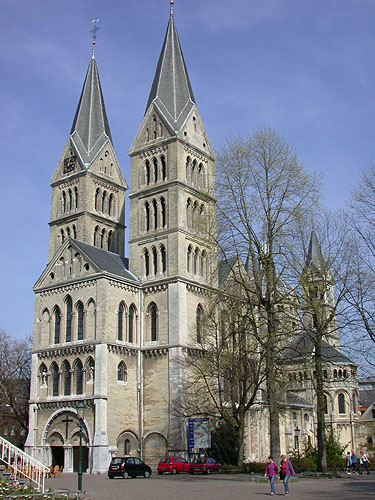
Munsterkerk, Roermond, extensively restored and altered under Cuypers

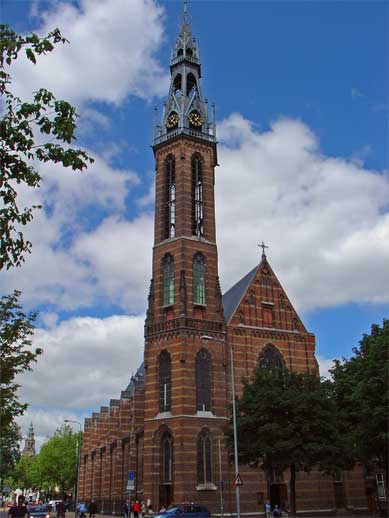
St. Joseph Cathedral, Groningen, designed by Pierre and Joseph Cuypers

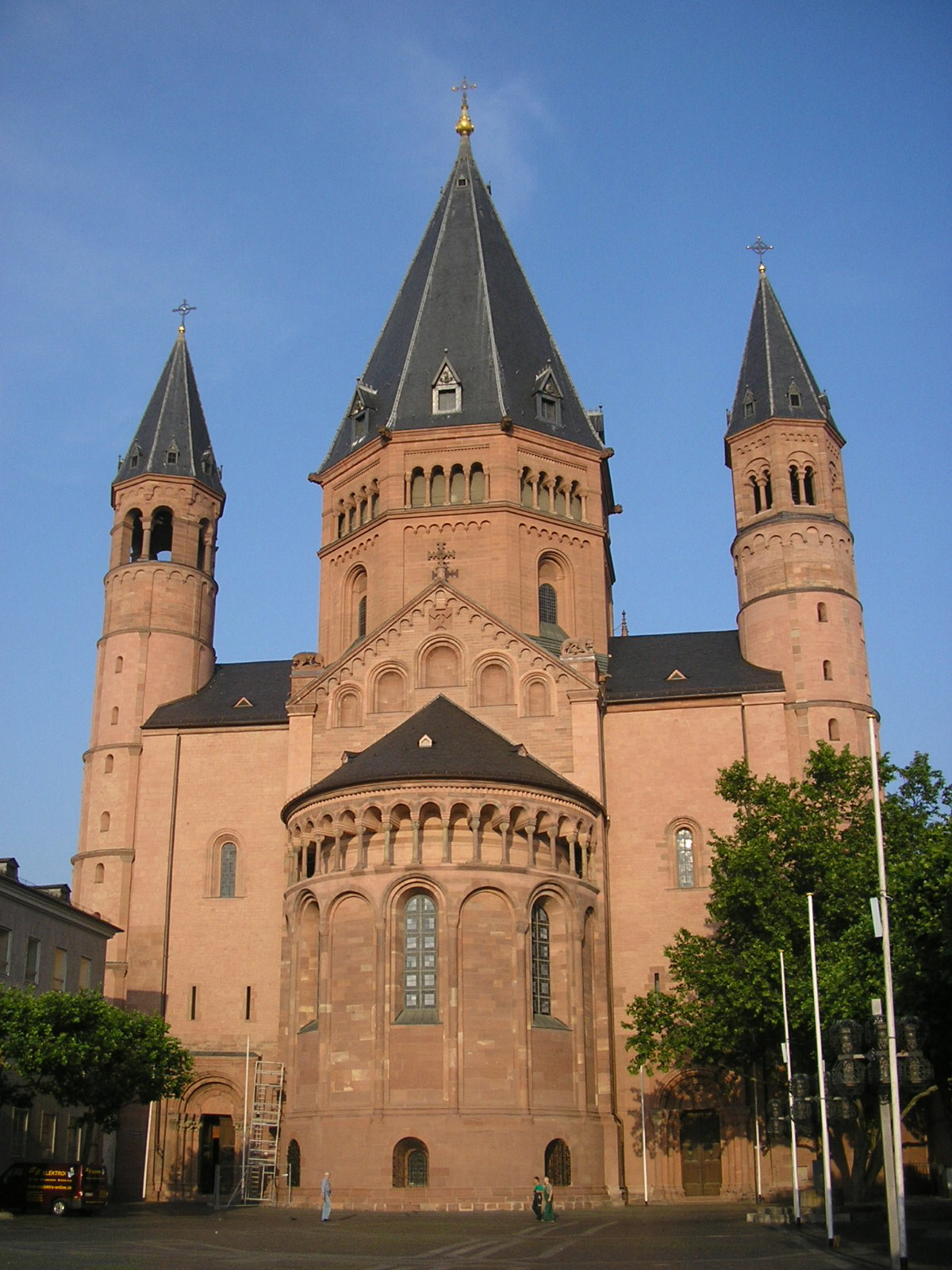
Eastern end of Mainz Cathedral, where Cuypers directed major restoration and reconstruction work in the 1870s

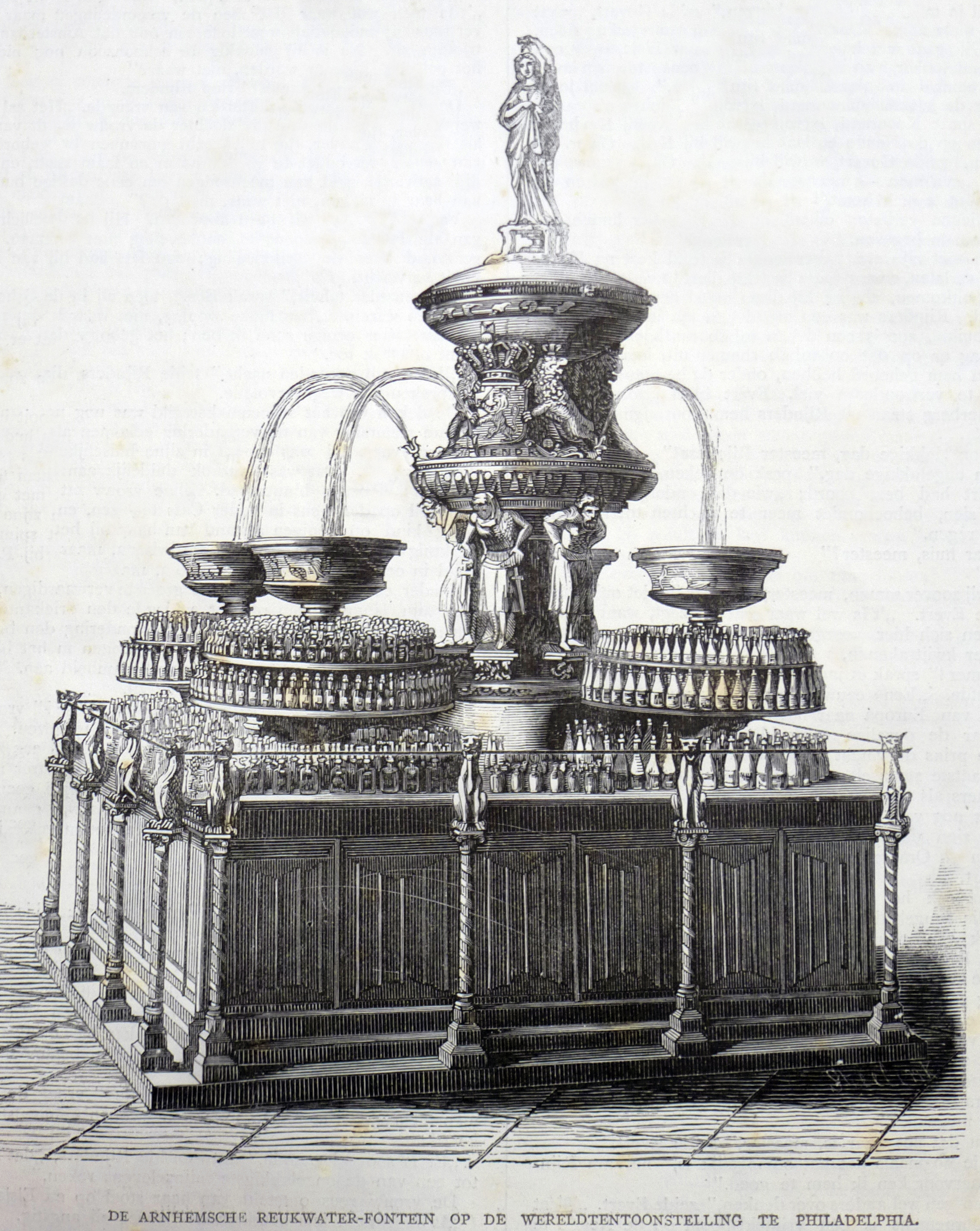
Design for the Arnhem perfume fountain exhibited as part of the Dutch contribution to the Centennial Exposition in Philadelphia in 1876

== See also ==
- Chief Government Architect of the Netherlands
