= Echt-Susteren =

Echt-Susteren Ech-Zöstere
- Municipality
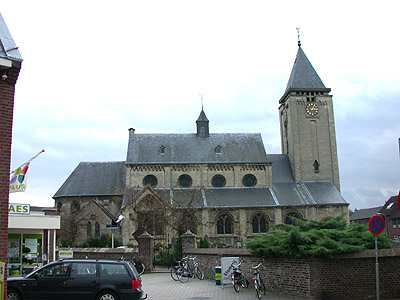
- Church in Nieuwstadt

- Flag Coat of arms

- Location in Limburg

- Location in the Netherlands
- Coordinates: 51°6′N 5°52′E
- Country: Netherlands
- Province: Limburg
- Established: 1 January 2003

Government
  - Body: Municipal council
  - Mayor: Jos Hessels (CDA)

Area
  - Total: 104.62 km^{2} (40.39 sq mi)
  - Land: 103.07 km^{2} (39.80 sq mi)
  - Water: 1.55 km^{2} (0.60 sq mi)
- Elevation: 30 m (98 ft)

Population (January 2021)
  - Total: 31,751
  - Density: 308/km^{2} (800/sq mi)
- Time zone: UTC+1 (CET)
  - Summer (DST): UTC+2 (CEST)
- Postcode: 6100–6118
- Area code: 046, 0475
- Website: www.echt-susteren.nl

Echt-Susteren (Dutch: [ˌɛxt ˈsʏstərə(n)]; Limburgish: Ech-Zöstere [ˌæx ˈsœstəʀə]) is a municipality in the southeastern Netherlands. Echt-Susteren was created in 2003 by merging the former municipalities of Echt and Susteren.

Echt-Susteren is situated in a Euregional area. In the west the municipality borders to Belgium and in the east to Germany. The narrowest is only 4.8 km wide. It is possible to walk from Germany to Belgium via Netherlands in under an hour. The area of Echt-Susteren is a green municipality also known as the green waist of Limburg.

== Population centres ==
Aasterberg, Baakhoven, Berkelaar, Dieteren, Echt, Echterbosch, Gebroek, Heide, Hingen, Illikhoven, Kokkelert, Koningsbosch, Maria-Hoop, Nieuwstadt, Oevereind, Ophoven, Oud-Roosteren, Pey, Pepinusbrug, Roosteren, Schilberg, Sint Joost, Slek, Susteren, Visserweert.

=== Echt ===
Echt is a former municipality. It received city rights in 1343.

=== Susteren ===
Susteren is a former municipality. It received city rights in 1276.

=== Maria-Hoop ===
Maria-Hoop is a small village in the neighbourhood of the hamlets Echterbosch and Putbroek and the village Koningsbosch. Originally named Diergaarde, the village's named was changed to Maria-Hoop in 1953, after the local church Moeder der H. Hoop.

=== Roosteren ===
The name of the village of Roosteren (population circa 1600, including Kokkelert and Oevereind) was derived from a combination of the Rode Beek (Red Brook) and the town of Suestra (Susteren) leading to the name Roosteren. The village has two 'castles', the Castle Ter Boch and the Castle Eyckholt and a number of Lord Manors. It is located in between the river Meuse (Maas) and the Juliana Canal (Julianakanaal) with a small part of the village separated from the main population centre by the canal: Oud Roosteren (Old Roosteren). The main church is located in Roosteren whereas the cemetery is located near the site of the former church in Old Roosteren.

== Topography ==
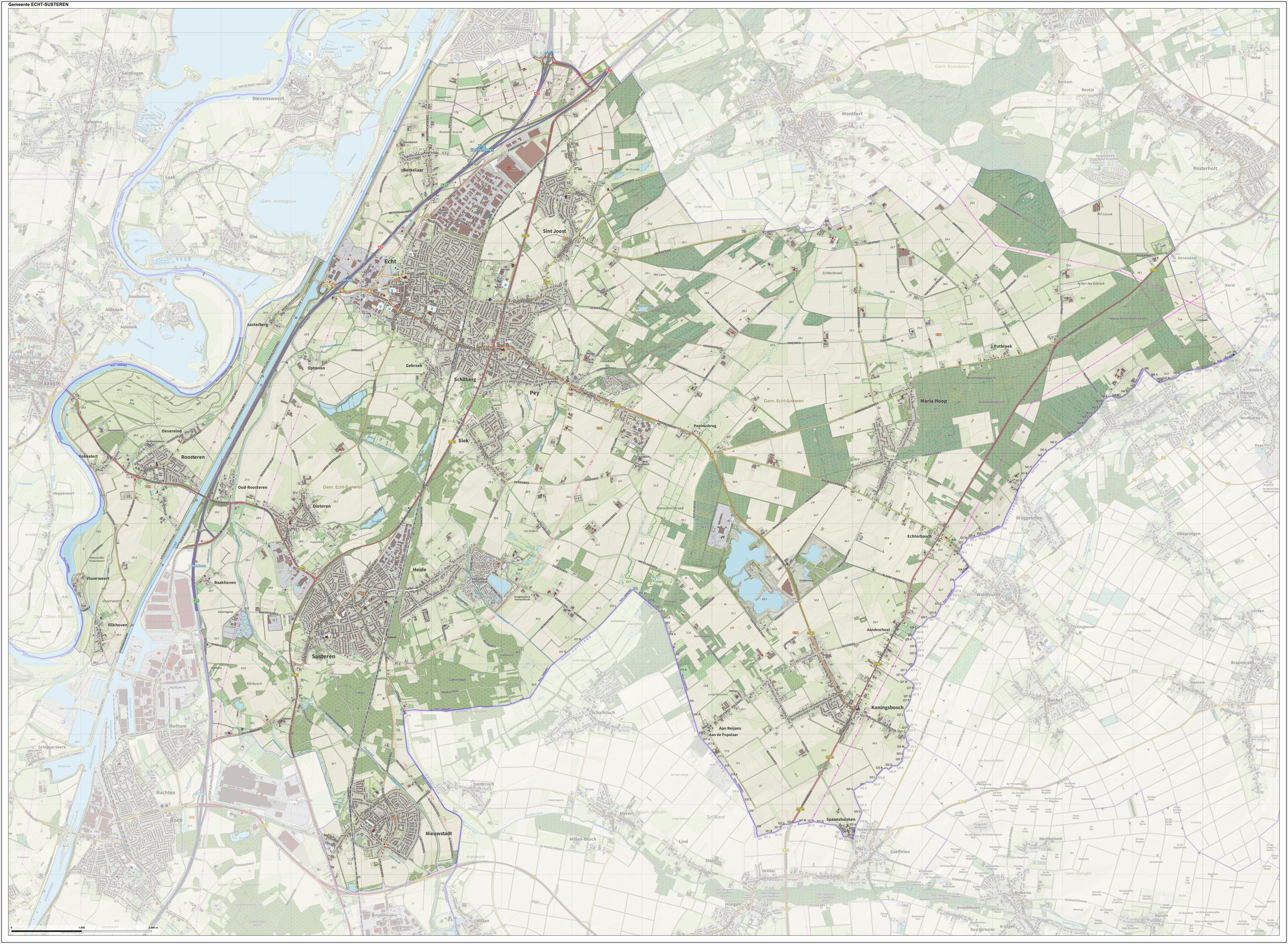

Dutch Topographic map of the municipality of Echt-Susteren, June 2015

== Notable people ==
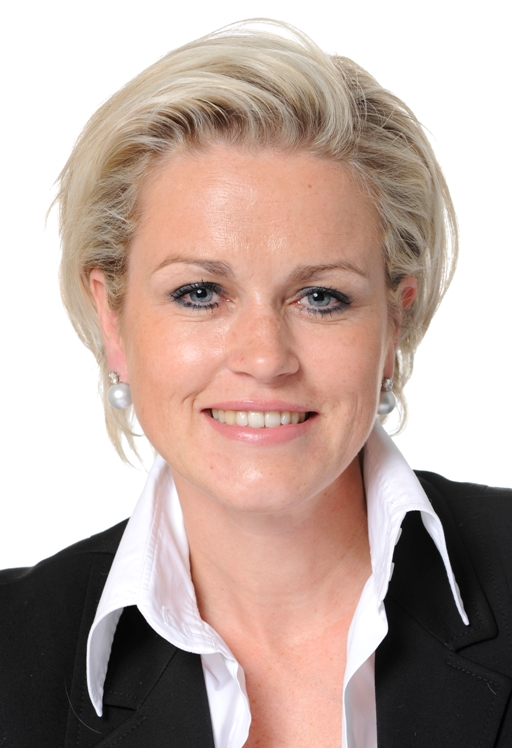
Laurence Stassen, 2009

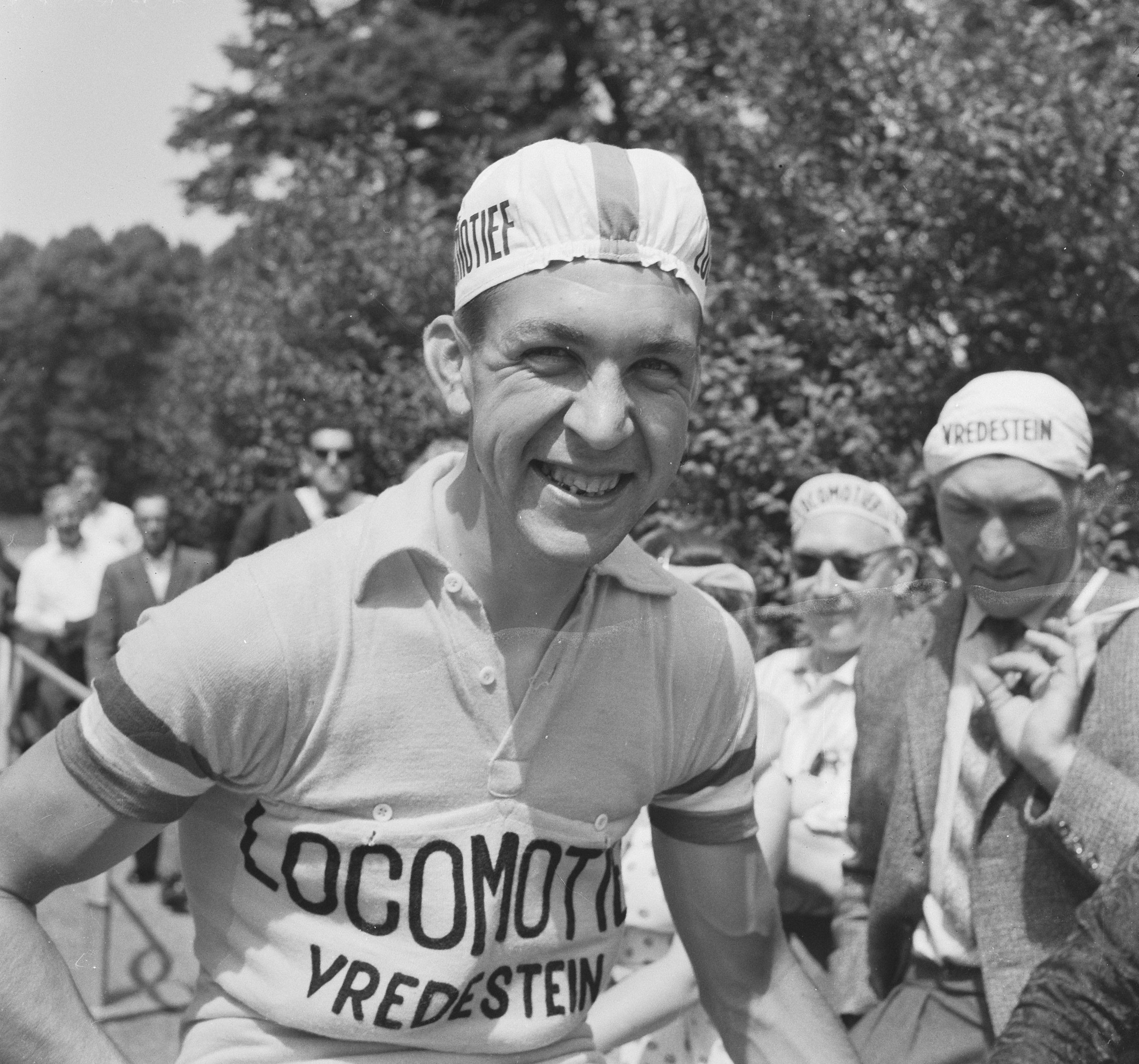
Martin van der Borgh, 1959

- Edith Stein (1891–1942) German Jewish philosopher who converted to Catholicism and became a nun. She is canonized as a martyr and saint of the Catholic Church. Lived in Echt
- Emeri Johannes van Donzel (1925 in Nieuwstadt − 2017) historian of the Middle East, particularly Ethiopia
- Frans Wackers (born 1939 in Echt) medical doctor, research scientist into nuclear cardiology
- Ria Oomen-Ruijten (born 1950 in St Joost) politician
- Ien Lucas (born 1955 in Echt) visual artist of abstract paintings on canvas or wood
- Adrian van Hooydonk (born 1964 in Echt) automobile designer, BMW Group's Design Director
- Roland van Vliet (born 1969 in Susteren) independent politician
- Laurence Stassen (born 1971 in Sittard) independent politician, former freelance TV presenter

=== Sport ===
- Martin van der Borgh (1934 in Koningsbosch – 2018) racing cyclist
- Jan Schröder (1941 in Koningsbosch – 2007) professional road and track cyclist.
- Sef Vergoossen (born 1947 in Echt) former football manager
- Demi Schuurs (born 1993 in Nieuwstadt) professional tennis player
- Perr Schuurs (born 1999 in Nieuwstadt) professional footballer
- Reno Francot (born 2007), racing driver

== Gallery ==
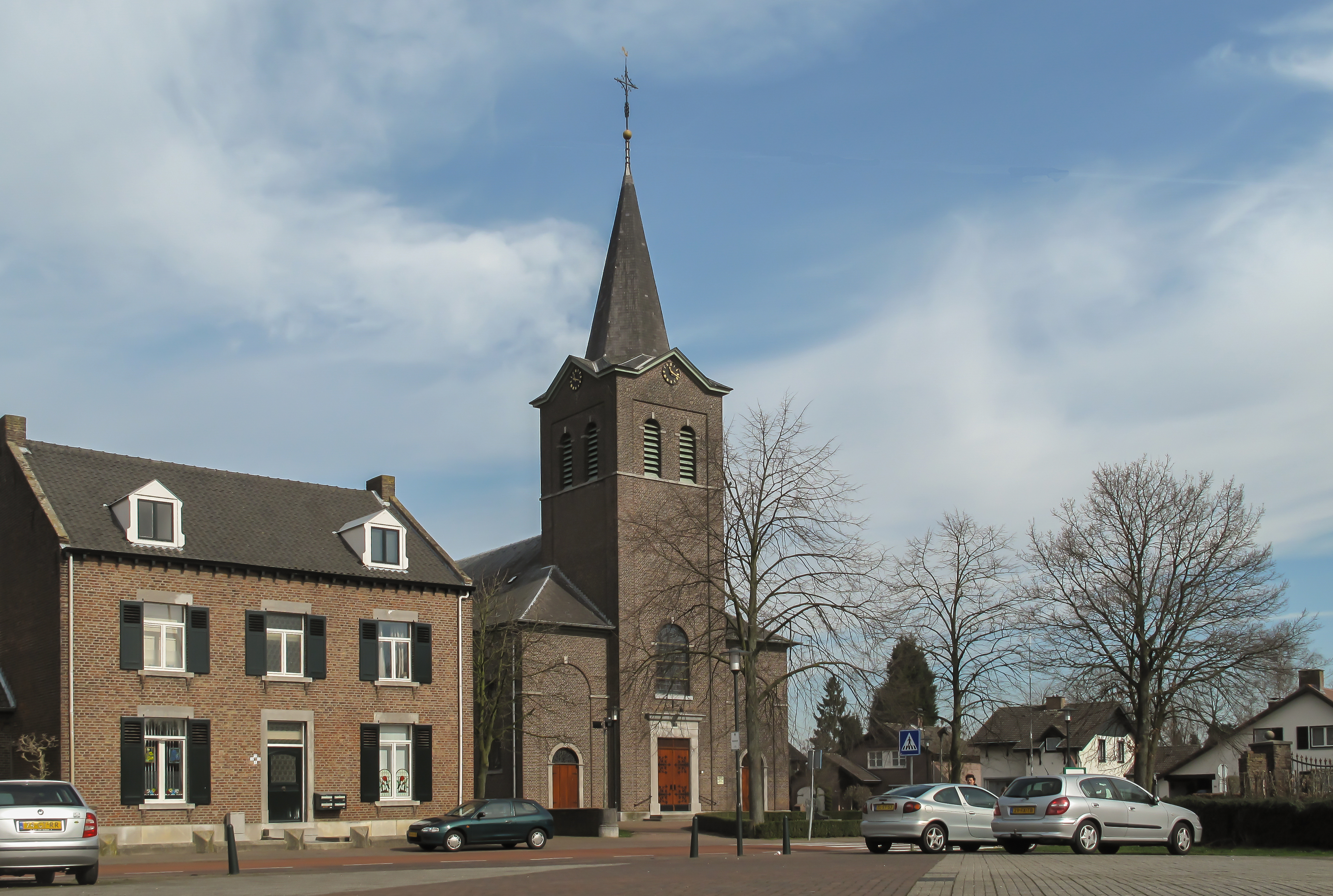
Roosteren, Kerk in straatzicht

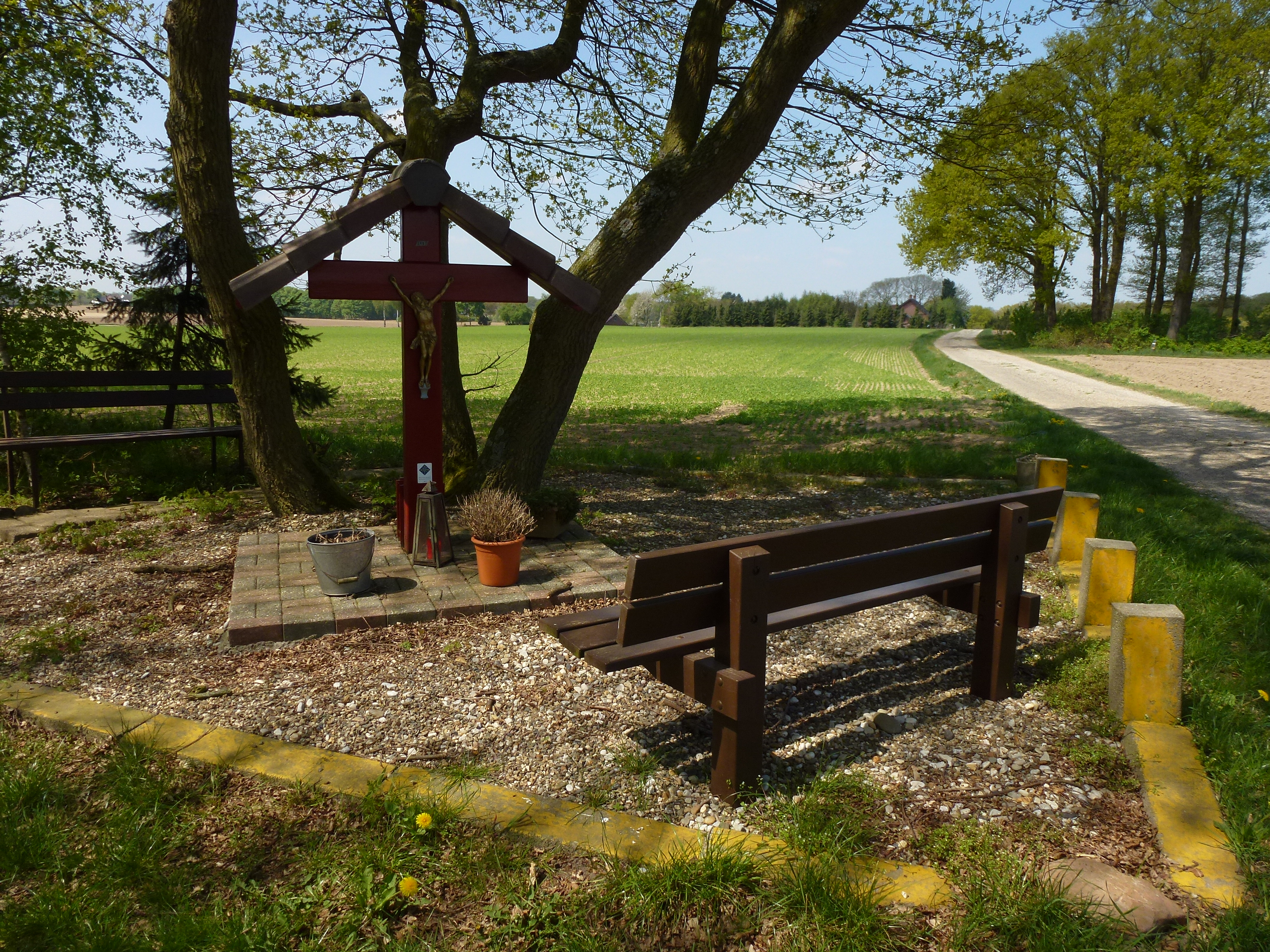
Maria-Hoop (Echt-Susteren) wegkruis Springweg

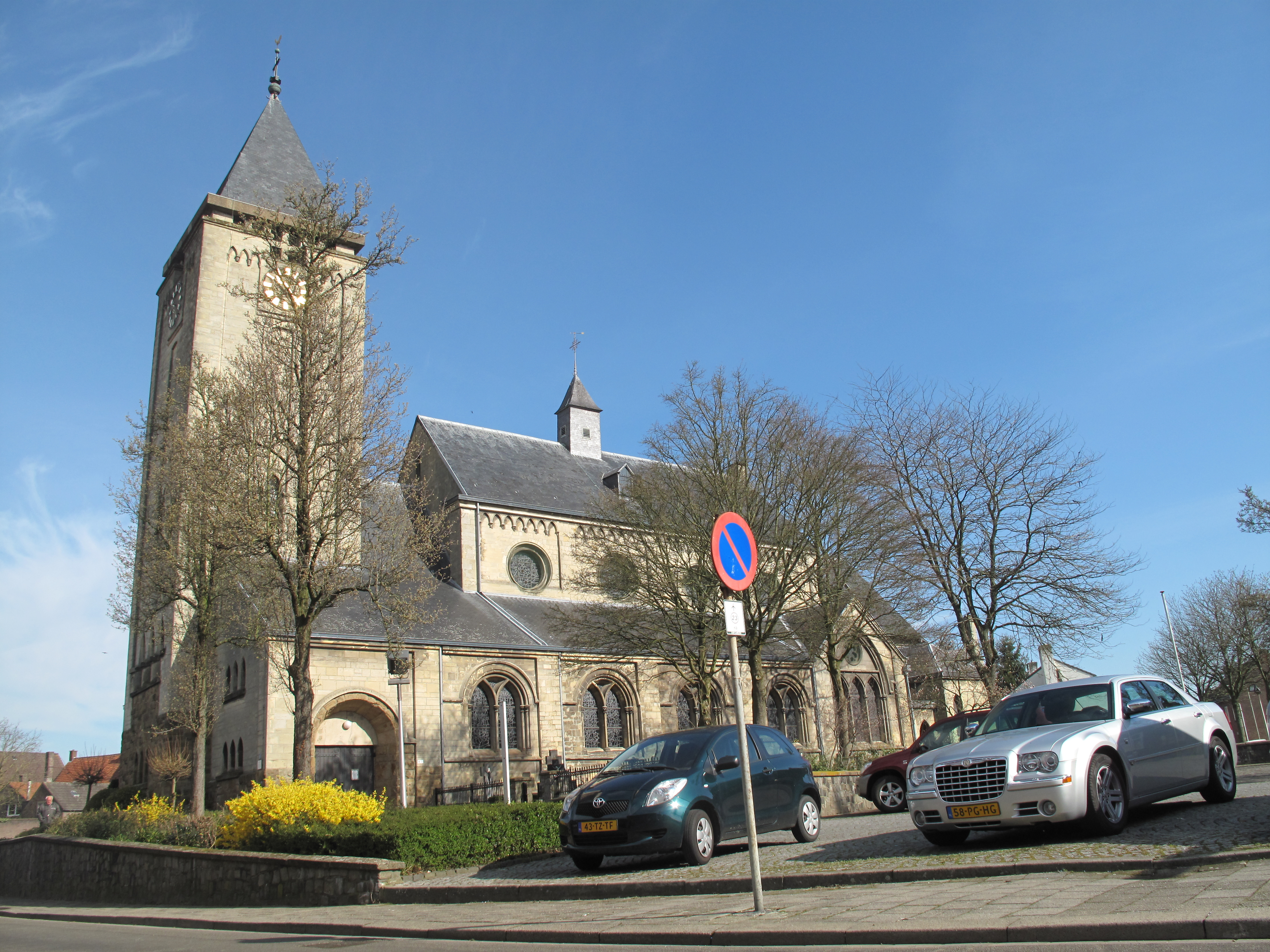
Nieuwstadt, kerk
