= Pepinusbrug =

- Hamlet
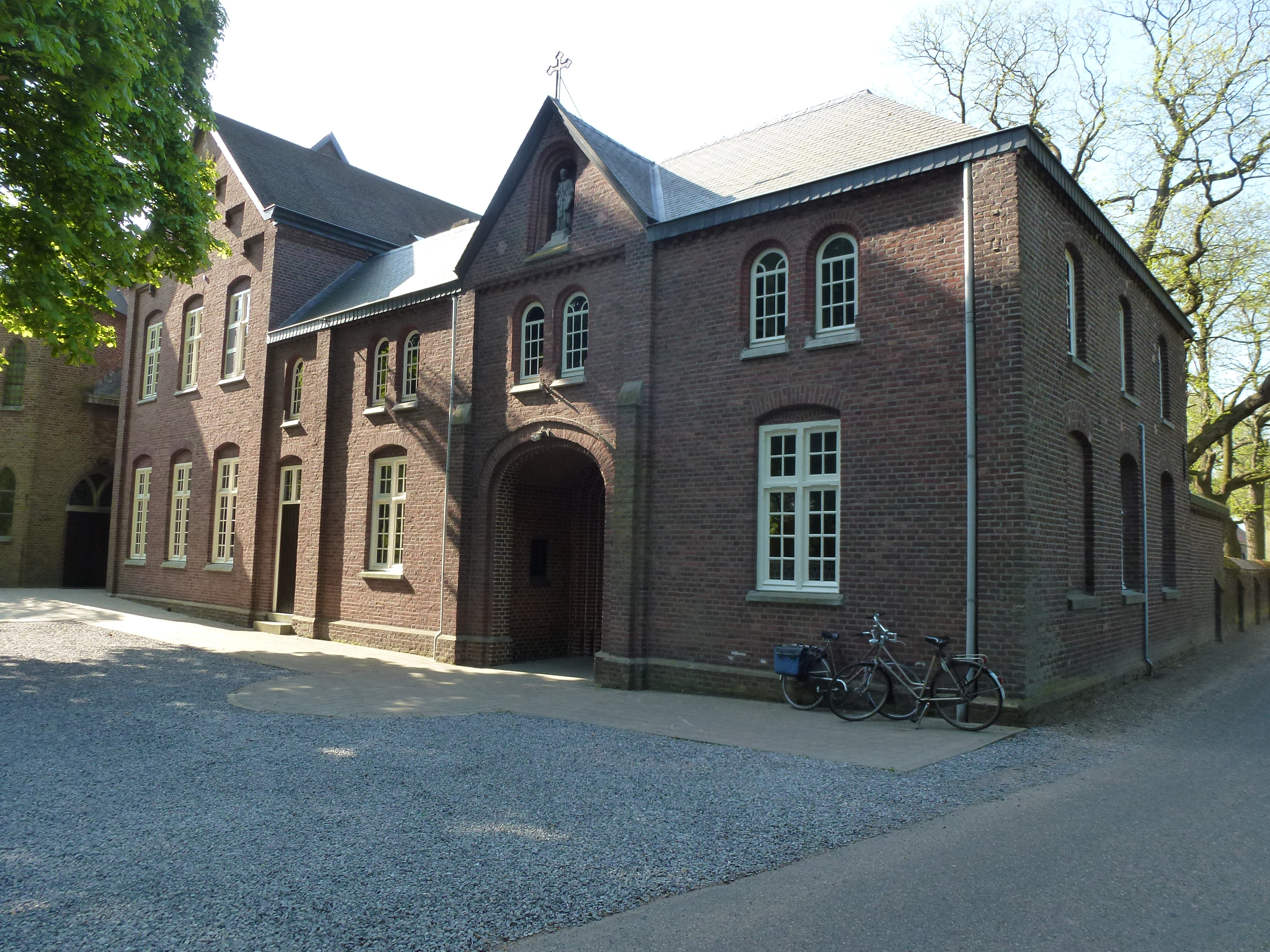
- Lilbosch Abbey in Pepinusbrug

- Location in the Netherlands Location in the province of Limburg in the Netherlands
- Coordinates: 51°05′12″N 5°55′30″E
- Country: Netherlands
- Province: Limburg
- Municipality: Echt-Susteren
- Time zone: UTC+1 (CET)
  - Summer (DST): UTC+2 (CEST)

Pepinusbrug is a hamlet south-east of Pey in the Dutch municipality Echt-Susteren.

The name Pepinusbrug originates from a legend about Pepin of Herstal, who was the lord of the Frankish kingdom. According to this legend, he went on an annual pilgrimage from his hometown of Herstal to the monastery on Mount Petrus (nowadays known as Sint Odiliënberg), which was supposedly founded by saints Wiro of Roermond, Plechelmus, and Otgerus. On his way to this monastery, Pepin got stuck in the vast swamps south of Echt, but a few neighbors saved him from drowning. Pepin was so grateful to the inhabitants of Echt that he donated a large piece of land and had a dyke and bridge built across the swamp.

Nowadays the reliability of this legend is doubted. It was first recorded in 1477 in the 'Cleernis van de gemeynte van Echt'. In this document the people of Echte ask their lord, the duke of Gelre, for protection against attacks from the neighbouring duke of Gulik. In return for the protection offered, the Duke of Gelre stipulated that the citizens of Echt should receive one third of the land from the donation of Pepin of Herstal, thus acknowledging the donation of Pepin of Herstal. In November 1940, the legend was also told to the Reich Commissioner of the occupied Netherlands, Arthur Seyss-Inquart, during his visit to the province of Limburg. The latter was so interested in the story that he commissioned architect Hendrik Willem Valk to design a new Pepinus bridge decorated with episodes from the legend, but this design was never executed.

In 1883, a Cistercian monastery opened in Pepinusbrug. In 1912, it was elevated to Lilbosch Abbey. Pepinusbrug does not have place name signs, and consists of about 40 houses excluding the care facility Pergamijn which is home to about 200 people.
