= Schilberg, Echt-Susteren =

Neighborhood in the Dutch Limburgish village of Pey

Schilberg
- Neighbourhood
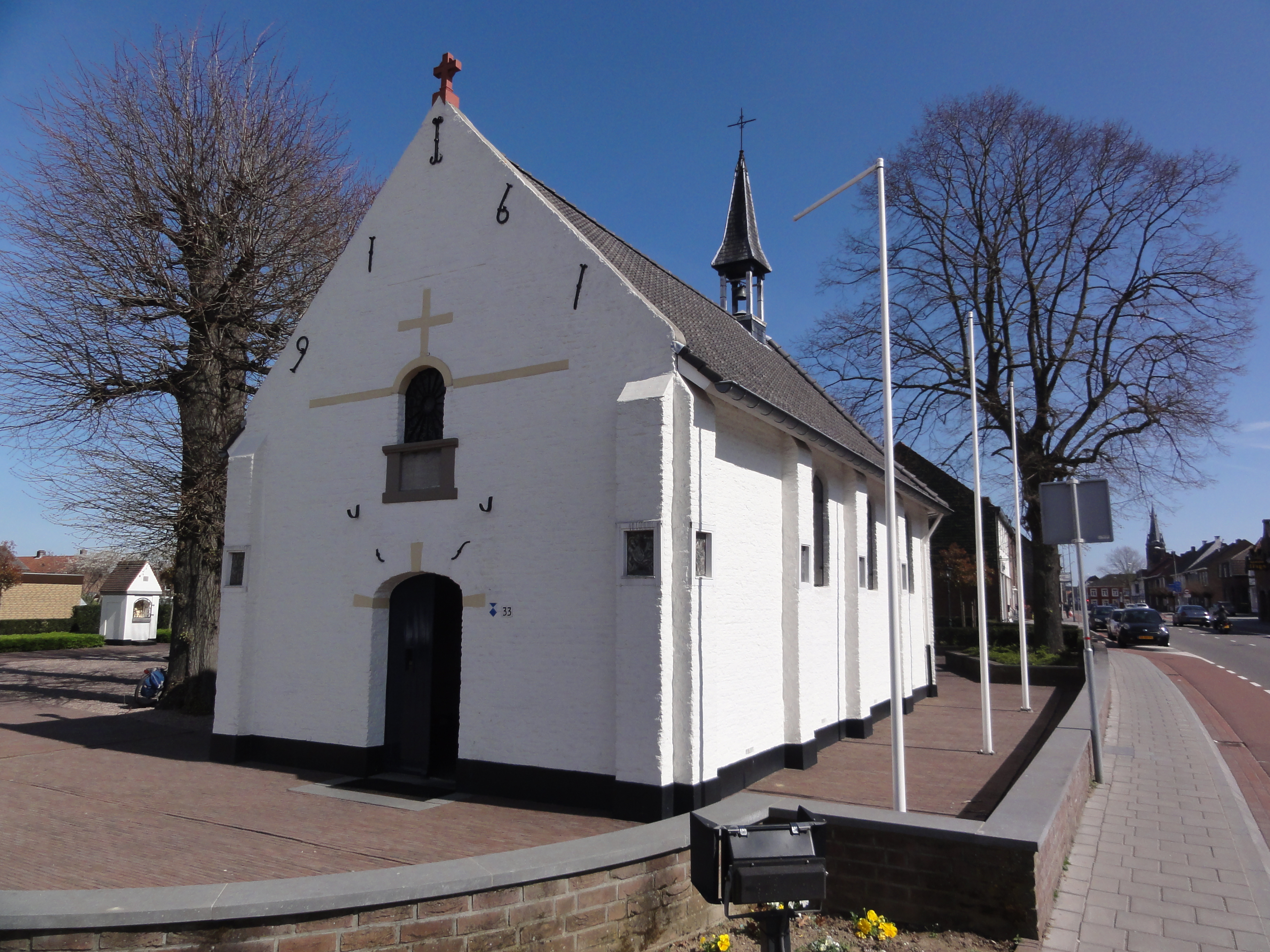
- The Onze Lieve-Vrouw Chapel in Schilberg

- Location in the Netherlands Location in the province of Limburg in the Netherlands
- Coordinates: 51.1010°N 5.8786°E
- Country: Netherlands
- Province: Limburg
- Municipality: Echt-Susteren
- Town: Pey

Area
  - Total: 0.88 km^{2} (0.34 sq mi)

Population (2021)
  - Total: 1,870
  - Density: 2,100/km^{2} (5,500/sq mi)
- Time zone: UTC+1 (CET)
  - Summer (DST): UTC+2 (CEST)
- Postal code: 6101
- Dialing code: 0475

Schilberg (Limburgish: Sjaelberg) is a neighborhood in the Dutch Limburgish village of Echt. It is home to Our Lady of Schilberg, a chapel and pilgrimage site. It was home to 1,870 people in 2021.

== Etymology ==
Schilberg was first mentioned around 1300 as Scheylberg, and means "leaning hill".

== Description ==
The neighborhood lies west of Pey village center and the N276 and east of Echt and the Roermond-Sittard railroad line. In the southeast lies the hamlet of Slek, in the northeast lies the residential area of Hingen. Schilberg is partly surrounded by agricultural fields, within walking distance from nature reserves. When the neighborhood was still rural, it consisted mainly of farmhouses and small houses for miners and employees of neighboring tile factories. The buildings were concentrated on the junction of Bosstraat and Heerweg. Most of the small houses have now disappeared. The buildings now vary from blocks of flats in the north, terraced houses just south of them, many detached and semi-detached houses and a few rows of terraced houses in the rest of the district.

It used to be a hamlet with a population of 63 people in 1840, but has become part of the town of Echt. The Chapel of Our Lady has been a site of pilgrimage since the 16th century. It used to be an independent parish until 1932 when it was merged into Echt.
