= Chapel of Our Lady, Echt =

- Onze-Lieve-Vrouwekapel in Echt (Dutch)
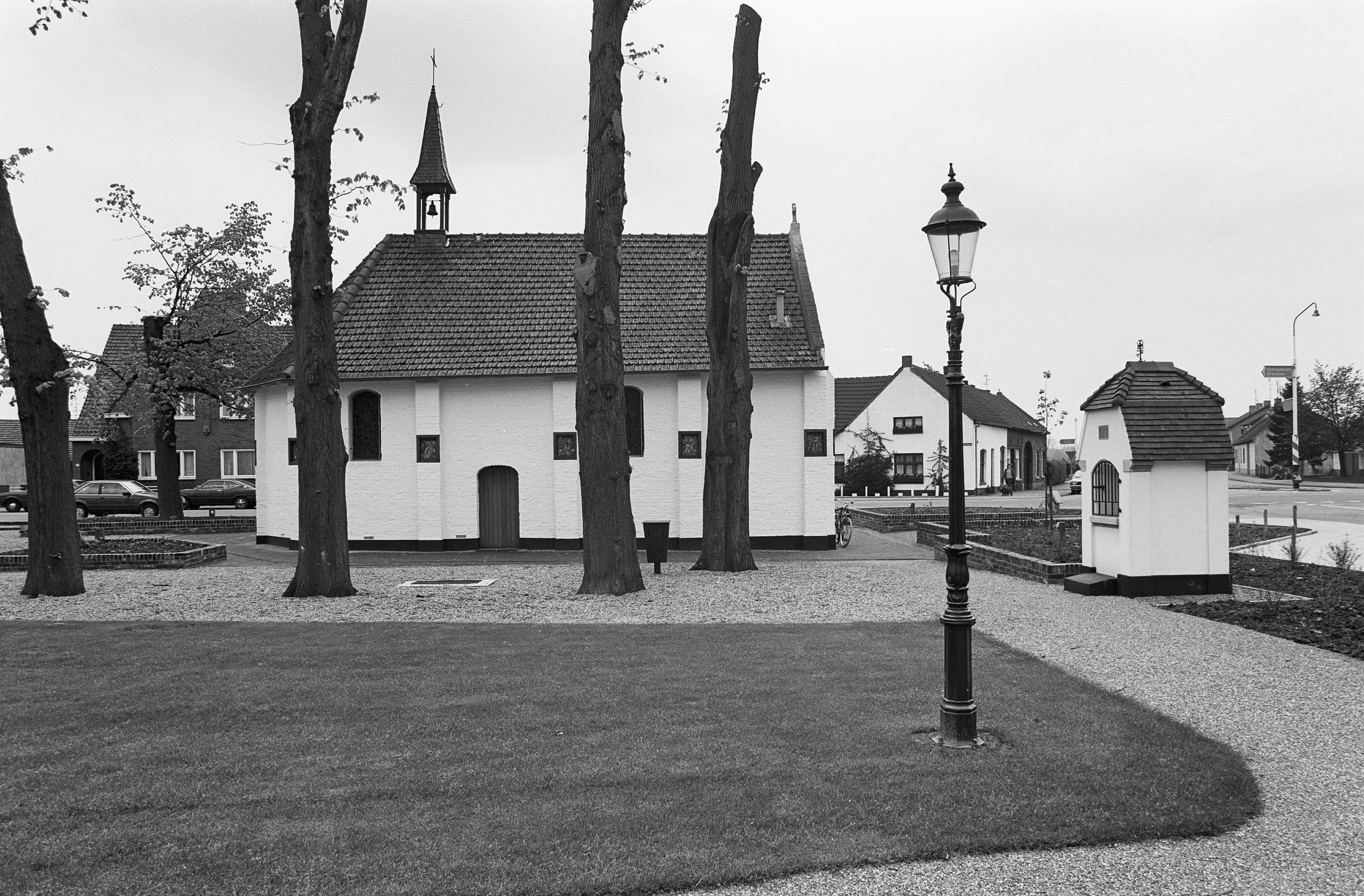
- North wall, Onze-Lieve-Vrouwekapel, Echt

- Location within Netherlands
- 51°05′53″N 5°52′53″E
- Location: Schilberg, Limburg

History
- Built: 1691

Rijksmonument
- Official name: Onze Lieve-Vrouwekapel in Echt

The Onze-Lieve-Vrouwekapel in Echt is a 17-century chapel in Schilberg, a hamlet between Pey and Echt in the Dutch province of Limburg. The chapel was declared a national monument. It is a pilgrimage site for the celebration of the Nativity of Mary.

== Description ==
The brick chapel bears a plaque commemorating its construction in 1691.

The stained-glass windows were replaced after World War II by Jacques Verheyen in 1947. The chapel also houses a 15th-century polychrome statue of the Virgin Mary, its patron. The Stations of the Cross were also made by Verheyen in 1947, and are located on the outside of the chapel. A wooden crucifix from about 1700 is found on the chapel's exterior.

In 1981, four small voetvallen (field chapels) with mansard roofs were moved from various places in the town to the chapel square. They are numbered I, II, III and VII. Originally there were at least seven, but only four remain. These structures date back to 1670 and are included in the designation as a national monument. The reliefs depicting the passion of the Christ are more recent.

== Pilgrimage site ==
The Chapel is a pilgrimage site for the celebration of the Octave of the Nativity of Mary. Pope Gregory XVI authorized the celebration on November 14, 1834 and promised indulgence to the pilgrims who attended. In the 19th century, several thousand people were in attendance of the open-air mass. The celebration, known as the Octaaf van Schilberg, is currently held in large tents next to the chapel. In 2015 a special mass to commemorate Saint Edith Stein was held in the context of the celebration.

The Foundation Onze Lieve Vrouw van Schilberg (Our Lady of Schilberg) was created in 1962 to promote the devotion of its patron, mainly through the organization of the Octave, and to maintain the chapel.

== See also ==
- List of Rijksmonuments
