= Zaret =

Zaret is a surname. Some notable people with the surname include:

- Barry L. Zaret (1940-2022), American nuclear cardiologist
- Daniel Zaret (1891–1984), Russian-born American citizen and educator
- Eli Zaret (born 1950), American sports broadcaster and journalist
- Hy Zaret (1907–2007), American lyricist and composer
- Kenneth Zaret, American biologist
