= Sint-Landricuskerk, Echt =

Church in Echt, Netherlands

Coordinates: 51°06′25″N 5°52′03″E

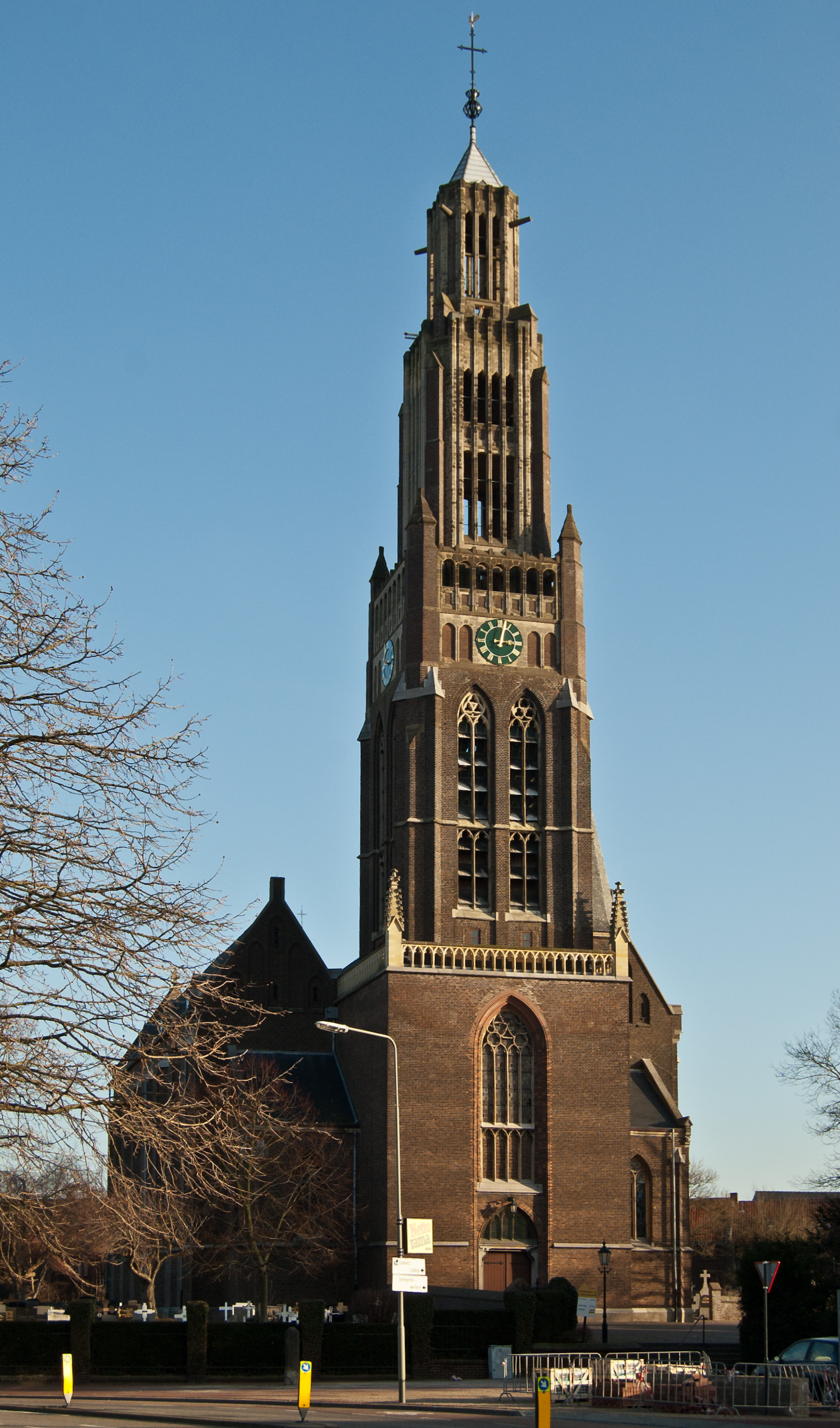
Saint Landricuskerk in Echt, Netherlands

Sint-Landricuskerk is the Roman Catholic parish church of Echt, dedicated to Saint Landry of Soignies.

== History ==
The origin of the parish of Echt goes back to the period 400–700, but the oldest written document mentioning a church is from 928. Then patronage rights and tithing rights of the parish were donated to the Saint Servatius Chapter in Maastricht.

This church was dedicated to Saint Anne and possibly also Saint Remigius, the bishop of Reims. Later, Saint Landry became the second patron saint and after 1722 the sole one. The church was built in marlstone in the Romanesque style. In 1477 the Romanesque church was replaced by a Late Gothic structure, keeping the choir that dates back to 1400.

In 1873, Dutch architect Pierre Cuypers was tasked with the renovation of the church. His intervention included enlarging the bays and the demolition, and replacement of the Romanesque tower with the current Neo-Gothic tower.

The church and the bell tower sustained heavy damage during World War II, particularly in 1944. The church was restored in 1946 save its spire. The roof was restored to its original design. The tower crown was designed by H. Tillman, and made of concrete in 1958. During the post-war restoration, In 1966 the church was badly damaged by fire, and was again restored. In 1992 the church sustained damage as a result of an earthquake, and was repaired in 1994.

== Location ==
Sint-Landricuskerk borders the historical center of Echt, situated on a low hill. In front of the church is a traffic-free square, and it is surrounded by a cemetery.

== Architecture, interior and relics ==
Sint-Landricuskerk is a three-aisled hall Neo-Gothic church with a three-sided closed choir. It has an annexed sacristy and an articulated tower with a stair turret and a high, modern crown. The ceiling is of simple rib vaults. The spaces between the inwardly built buttresses at the side aisles are covered with narrow cross vaults. The interior was painted by Dutch painter Hubert Hendrik Jacob Kurvers during the 1994 restoration.

The church contains a number of historical items and relics. Two oak choir stalls date to the 17th century; it also has four 18th-century confessionals. The marble baptismal font is from the 2nd half of the 17th century. A wooden crucifix is roughly dated to the 16th century, and a wooden statue of Saint Martin and a terracotta statue of Saint Francis date to the 17th century. The church tower was restored with its clock that is believed to have been made my master clockmaker Henricus in the 13th century.

In 2014, the church became an official pilgrimage site for Saint Edith Stein, a Jewish-Catholic philosopher nun from the Carmelite convent in Echt. The church has a memorial dedicated to the saint, it consists of a lectern and a triptych by artist Karin Deneer, and a display case housing the choir robe of Stein, which she wore when she was deported in 1942.

== Sources ==
- "Kerkgebouwen in Limburg". www.kerkgebouwen-in-limburg.nl.
- Stenvert, Ronald; Kolman, Chris; Van Ginkel-Meester, Saskia; Broekhoven, Sabine; Stades-Vischer, Elisabeth; Venner, Jos (2003). "Monumenten in Nederland - Limburg" (PDF). Digitale bibliotheek voor de Nederlandse letteren. Zwolle: Waanders Uitgevers. Archived (PDF) from the original on 2022-01-21.
