= Ulingsheide Abbey =

Trappist monastery in the Netherlands

Coordinates: 51°20′8.5554″N 6°10′34.4634″E

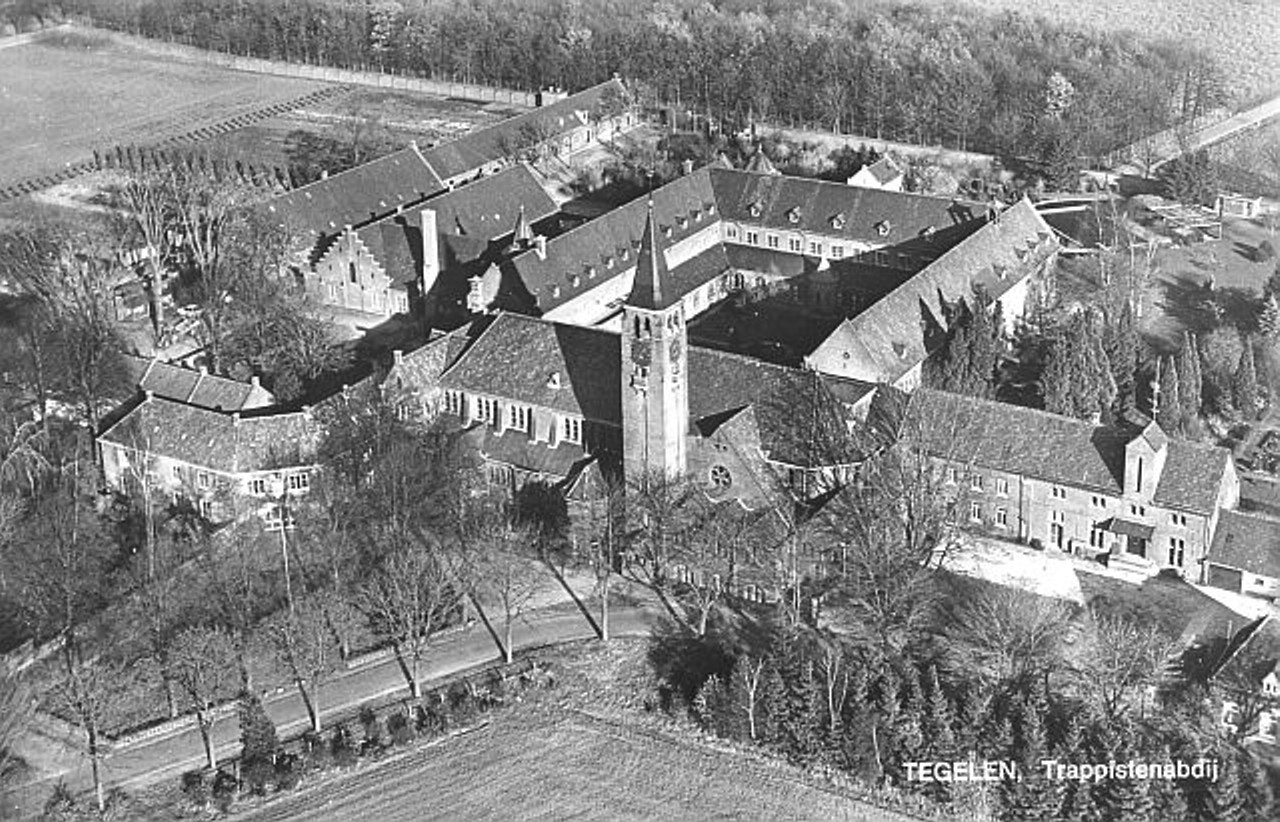
Ulingsheide Abbeynn - 1920

Ulingsheide Abbey was a Trappist monastery in Tegelen, Venlo, the Netherlands, very close to the Dutch border with Germany. It was founded in 1884 as a daughter house of Westmalle Abbey in Belgium, to receive German novices in the wake of the Kulturkampf. The community was merged to that of Lilbosch Abbey in 2002, the house becoming an annex of Lilbosch. As of summer 2020 negotiations were ongoing for the sale of the property to developers.

The monastery was built in the years 1888–1892 to designs by Caspar Franssen (a pupil of Pierre Cuypers). In 1926 a chapel was added, designed by Frans Stoks in a Traditionalist style influenced by Expressionism and Art Deco. The chapel's interior was restyled in 1980.
