= Nieuwstadt =

- City
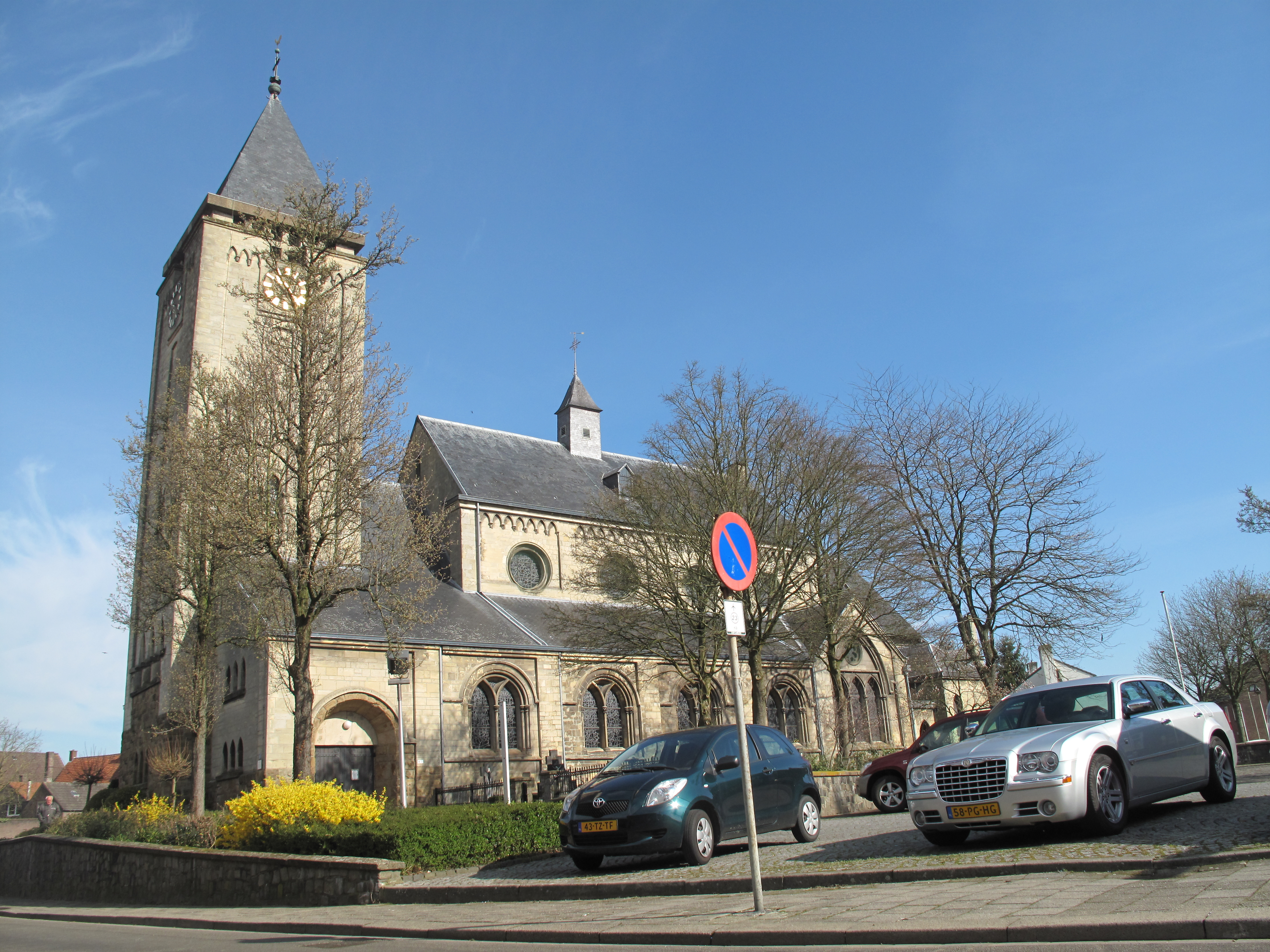
- Nieuwstadt, church: Sint Johannes de Doperkerk (En: Saint John the Baptist church)

- Flag Coat of arms

- Location in the Netherlands Location in the province of Limburg in the Netherlands
- Coordinates: 51°2′N 5°52′E
- Country: Netherlands
- Province: Limburg
- Municipality: Echt-Susteren

Area
  - Total: 3.96 km^{2} (1.53 sq mi)
- Elevation: 34 m (112 ft)

Population (2021)
  - Total: 3,260
  - Density: 823/km^{2} (2,130/sq mi)
- Time zone: UTC+1 (CET)
  - Summer (DST): UTC+2 (CEST)
- Postal code: 6118
- Dialing code: 046
- Major roads: N276, N297

Nieuwstadt (Limburgish: De Nuujsjtad, German: Neustadt) is a town in the Dutch province of Limburg. It is part of the municipality of Echt-Susteren, and lies about 5 km north of Sittard.

== History ==
Nieuwstadt was first mentioned in 1242 as "Novo Opido" which means "new (fortified) city", and received city rights in 1277. Nieuwstadt was a border city of the Duchy of Guelders and received city walls. In 1383, it was severely damaged and a more compact settlement was developed. In 1573, the walls were demolished and Nieuwstadt started to stagnate.

The Catholic St John the Baptist Church has a nave from the 13th century. The choir added in the 14th century is slightly crooked. The church was restored in 1862 by Pierre Cuypers and repaired in 1946 after being damaged in World War II.

Millen Castle is located to the south-east of Nieuwstadt. There is still a ruin of the medieval castle which probably had its origins in the 13th century. In 1365, a ring wall with two towers were added. Around 1450, a second ring was added. The castle was demolished from 1650 onwards. In the late-17th century, an estate was built near the former castle.

Nieuwstadt was home to 830 people in 1840. It was a separate municipality until 1982, when it was merged into Echt-Susteren.

== Gallery ==
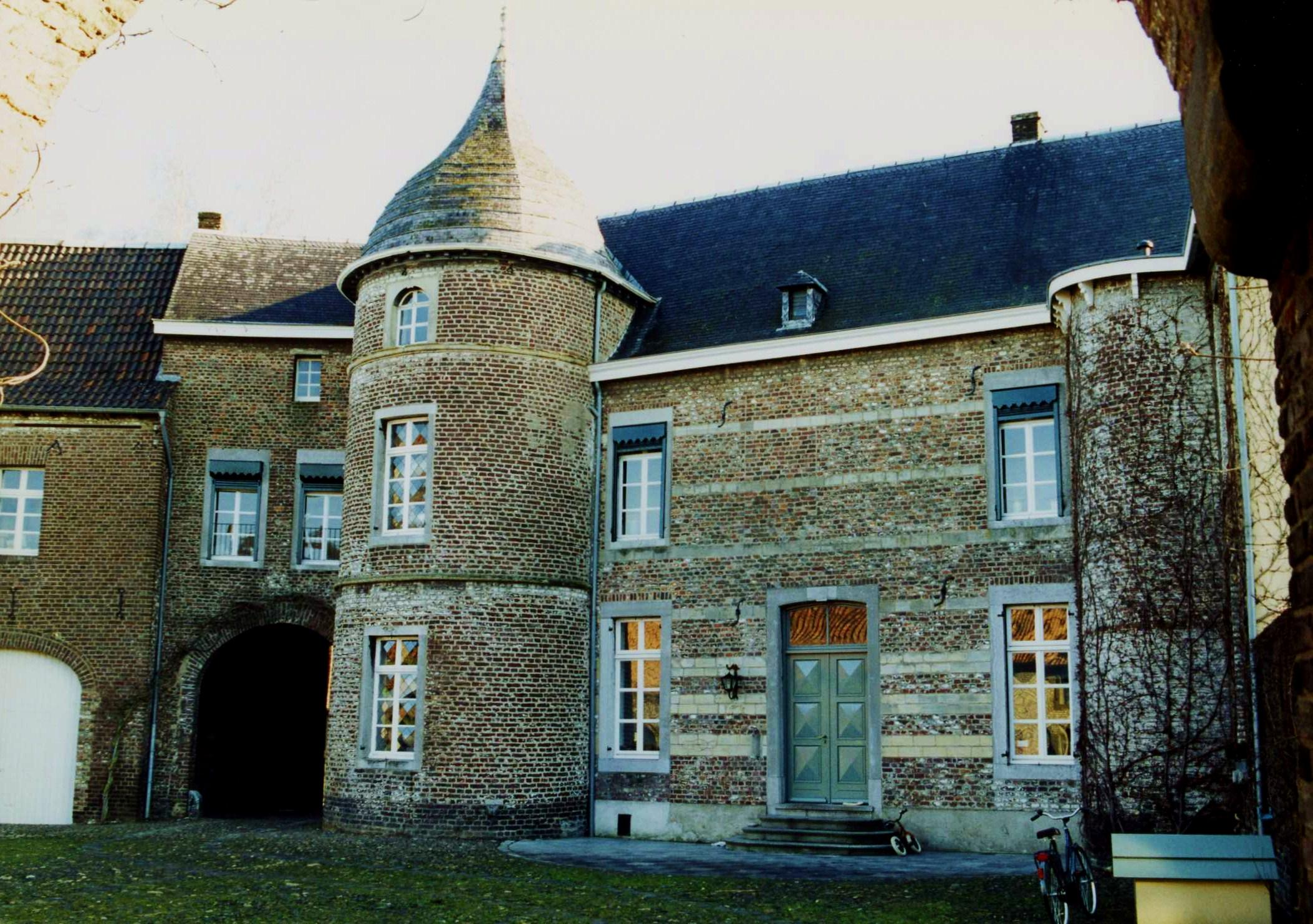
Millen Castle

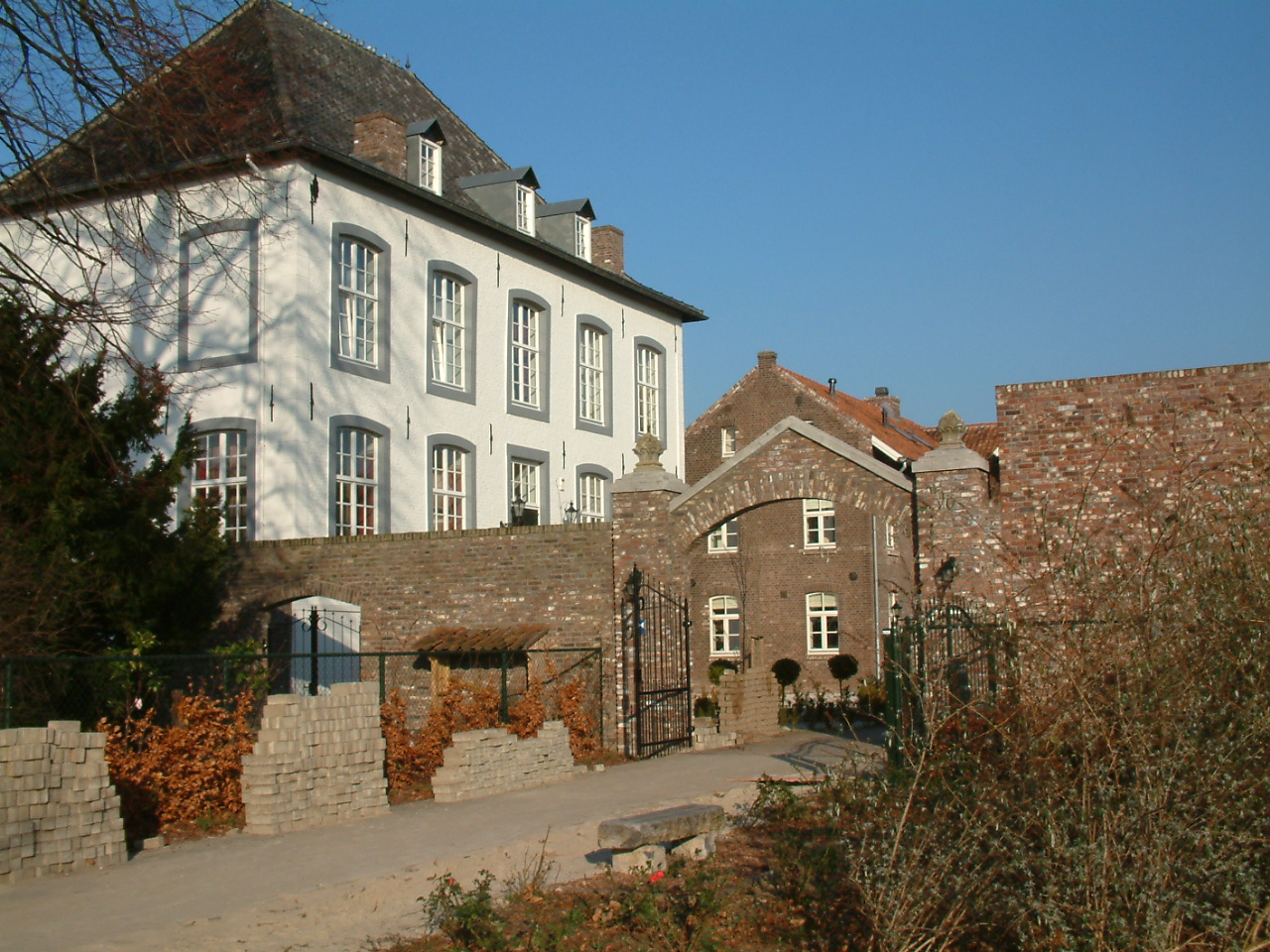
Estate Huis Witham

== Notable people ==
- Emeri Johannes van Donzel (1925–2017), historian
- Martijn van Helvert (born 1978), politician
- Demi Schuurs (born 1993), tennis player
- Perr Schuurs (born 1999), footballer
