= Frans Wackers =

Dutch American cardiologist

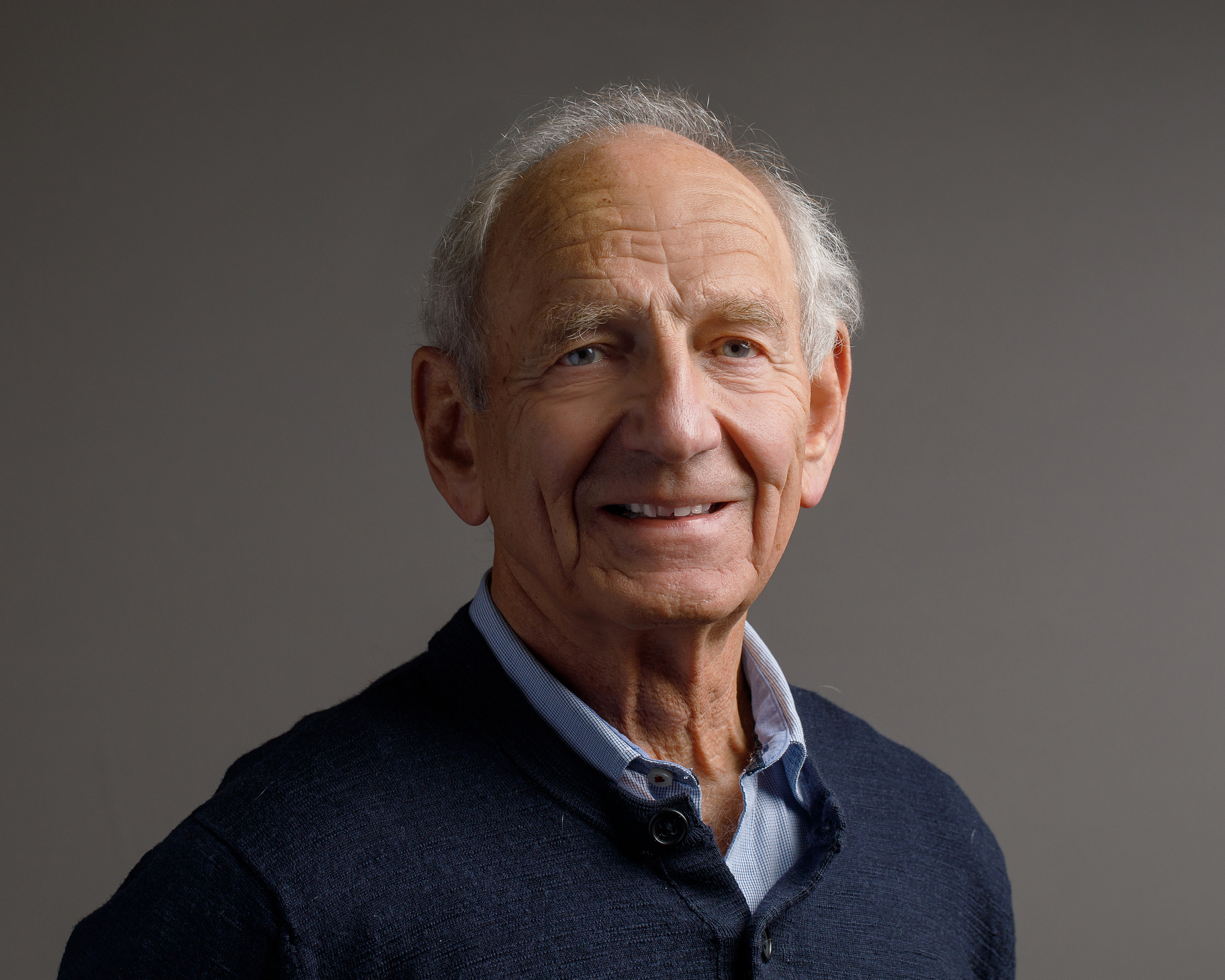
- Born: Frans Jozef Thomas Wackers; 1939 (age 86–87); Echt, Limburg, Netherlands
- Citizenship: Dutch
- Education: University of Amsterdam (M.D./Ph.D., 1970)
- Occupation: Cardiologist
- Known for: Visualizing heart disease with radioisotope thallium-201 for heart imaging
- Medical career
- Institutions: Yale University School of Medicine
- Research: Nuclear cardiology
- Notable works: Clinical cardiac imaging applications with radiotracers

Frans Jozef Thomas Wackers (born 1939) is a Dutch American clinical cardiologist and research scientist known for his contributions to nuclear cardiology. In 1974, he explored a new way of visualizing heart disease. He pioneered using the radioisotope thallium-201 for heart imaging, which started a new cardiology sub-specialty, later called Nuclear Cardiology. Wackers was the director of the Cardiovascular Nuclear Imaging and Stress Laboratories at Yale School of Medicine for 22 years. In 2008, he became a Professor Emeritus at Yale University. On January 1, 2013, Wackers fully retired from clinical and scientific responsibilities.

== Early life ==
Wackers was born on May 29, 1939, in Echt, Limburg, a rural town in the south of the Netherlands. His father, Thomas F. J. Wackers, from Maasniel, Limburg, was a urologist-surgeon in The Hague. His mother, Miep Koopman, from Amsterdam, died at age 44 when Frans was 16 years old.

In Limburg, Wackers saw the beginning of World War II and five years of German Nazi occupation. In January 1945, Frans as a young boy, also experienced the fierce fighting and bloody battle between British and German troops during Operation Blackcock in the Roermond Triangle, in the middle of which the Germans evacuated Frans' family.

== Education and positions held ==
After the liberation of the Netherlands from the Nazi occupation, his family moved in September 1945 to Amsterdam. Wackers attended elementary school in Amsterdam, High School (Jesuit Aloysius College) in The Hague, and Medical School at the University of Amsterdam (UvA).

While a medical school student, Wackers began research in 1963 as a student-research-assistant in the UvA Anatomical Pathology Laboratory under the mentorship of Professor Jan Hampe. Frans' research involved the investigation of the microanatomy of the female mammary gland. In 1966, Wackers continued his research during a 6-month scholarship at the cancer center, Institut Gustave Roussy, in Paris France. Wackers' description of a histological localized bionecrosis in breast tissue was later recognized as an early description of apoptosis.

In 1970, Wackers earned his Ph.D. from the University of Amsterdam. He graduated with an M.D. from the Amsterdam School of Medicine in the same year.

From 1972 to 1974, Wackers pursued his Internal Medicine Residency at the Wilhelmina Gasthuis University Hospital in Amsterdam and subsequently continued with a Cardiology Fellowship at the same institution from 1974 to 1977.

His career in the United States began in 1977 with the recruitment as an Assistant Professor by the Section of Cardiovascular Medicine at Yale University School of Medicine, New Haven, CT. Later, he was appointed Associate Professor at the University of Vermont College of Medicine (1981–1984). He returned to Yale University School of Medicine and became a full professor with tenure in diagnostic radiology and medicine (cardiology) in 1986. Wackers continued his clinical research and published more than 350 scientific publications in medical journals.

== The evolution of nuclear cardiology ==
Wackers was a pioneer in exploring and advancing new clinical cardiac imaging applications with radiotracers, particularly thallium-201, for detecting coronary artery disease. In 1974, he was the first physician to administer the radioisotope thallium-201 to patients with acute heart disease. His 1976 publication with images of patients with acute heart attacks contributed to the widespread acceptance of clinical thallium -201 imaging. He strongly advocated digitizing and quantifying cardiac images and standardization of imaging protocols.

Wackers was involved with the clinical introduction of new radiopharmaceuticals labeled with technetium-99m (sestamibi and tetrofosmin); the transitioning from planar imaging to three-dimensional imaging with Single Photon Emission Computerized Tomography (SPECT). In 1993, along with a core group of clinical investigators, he founded the American Society of Nuclear Cardiology (ASNC). He established the Certification Board of Nuclear Cardiology (CBNC) in 1996 and the Intersocietal Commission for Accreditation of Nuclear Laboratories (ICANL) in 1997.

== Affiliations ==
- Fellow of the American College of Cardiology
- Fellow of the American Heart Association, Council on Clinical Cardiology
- Founding member and Master of the American Society of Nuclear Cardiology (President, 1994–1995)
- Member of the Society of Nuclear Medicine (President of Cardiovascular Council, 1992–1995)
- Member of the European Society of Cardiology (2003)
- Founding member of the Certification Board of Nuclear Cardiology (President, 1996–1997)
- Founding member of the Intersocietal Commission for Accreditation of Nuclear laboratories (1997–2005)

Wackers also co-chaired the 2003 and 2005 International Conference of Nuclear Cardiology in Florence and Lisbon.

== Awards ==
- Rescar Award of the University of Maastricht, The Netherlands (1988),
- Herrman L Blumgart Award of the Society of Nuclear Medicine, New England Chapter (1995)
- Homi Baba Award of the Indian Nuclear Cardiological Society (1997).
- Eugene Drake Award of the American Heart Association, New England Affiliate (1999)
- Distinguished Service Award of the Society of Nuclear Cardiology (1999).
- Third Mario Verani Memorial Lecturer of the American Society of Nuclear Cardiology (2004)
- Wenckebach Lecturer of the Dutch Society of Cardiology (2005)
- Mario Verani Lecturer of Methodist Hospital, Houston, Texas (2006).

== Publications ==
He was on the editorial board of the Journal of the American College of Cardiology, the American Journal of Cardiology, and Journal of Nuclear Cardiology.

He has published more than 340 articles on nuclear cardiology and clinical cardiology.

=== Selected articles ===
- Wackers, Frans J. Th; Young, Lawrence H.; Inzucchi, Silvio E.; Chyun, Deborah A.; Davey, Janice A.; Barrett, Eugene J.; Taillefer, Raymond; Wittlin, Steven D.; Heller, Gary V.; Filipchuk, Neil; Engel, Samuel; Ratner, Robert E.; Iskandrian, Ami E.; Detection of Ischemia in Asymptomatic Diabetics Investigators (2004). "Detection of silent myocardial ischemia in asymptomatic diabetic subjects: the DIAD study". Diabetes Care. 27 (8): 1954–1961. doi:10.2337/diacare.27.8.1954. ISSN 0149-5992. PMID 15277423.
- Wackers, F. J.; Sokole, E. B.; Samson, G. (1 July 1976). "Value and limitations of thallium-201 scintigraphy in the acute phase of myocardial infarction". The New England Journal of Medicine. 295 (1): 1–5. doi:10.1056/NEJM197607012950101. ISSN 0028-4793. PMID 1272283.
- Wackers, F. J.; Berman, D. S.; Maddahi, J.; Watson, D. D.; Beller, G. A.; Strauss, H. W.; Boucher, C. A.; Picard, M.; Holman, B. L.; Fridrich, R. (1989). "Technetium-99m hexakis 2-methoxyisobutyl isonitrile: human biodistribution, dosimetry, safety, and preliminary comparison to thallium-201 for myocardial perfusion imaging". Journal of Nuclear Medicine. 30 (3): 301–311. ISSN 0161-5505. PMID 2525610.
- Young, Lawrence H.; Wackers, Frans J. Th; Chyun, Deborah A.; Davey, Janice A.; Barrett, Eugene J.; Taillefer, Raymond; Heller, Gary V.; Iskandrian, Ami E.; Wittlin, Steven D.; Filipchuk, Neil; Ratner, Robert E.; Inzucchi, Silvio E.; DIAD Investigators (2009-04-15). "Cardiac outcomes after screening for asymptomatic coronary artery disease in patients with type 2 diabetes: the DIAD study: a randomized controlled trial". JAMA. 301 (15): 1547–1555. doi:10.1001/jama.2009.476. ISSN 1538-3598. PMC 2895332. PMID 19366774.
- Brush, J. E.; Brand, D. A.; Acampora, D.; Chalmer, B.; Wackers, F. J. (1985-05-02). "Use of the initial electrocardiogram to predict in-hospital complications of acute myocardial infarction". The New England Journal of Medicine. 312 (18): 1137–1141. doi:10.1056/NEJM198505023121801. ISSN 0028-4793. PMID 3920520.
- Wackers, F. J.; Lie, K. I.; Sokole, E. B.; Res, J.; Van der Schoot, J. B.; Durrer, D. (1978). "Prevalence of right ventricular involvement in inferior wall infarction assessed with myocardial imaging with thallium-201 and technetium-99m pyrophosphate". The American Journal of Cardiology. 42 (3): 358–362. doi:10.1016/0002-9149(78)90928-1. ISSN 0002-9149. PMID 210648.

== Books ==
- If My Memory Serves Me Right, An Autobiography (2023)
- The Wackers from Echt, The Koopmans from Brecklenkamp, A Genealogical Exploration (2023)
