= Carmelite Monastery, Echt =

Carmelite monastery in the Netherlands

Coordinates: 51°06′13″N 5°51′59″E

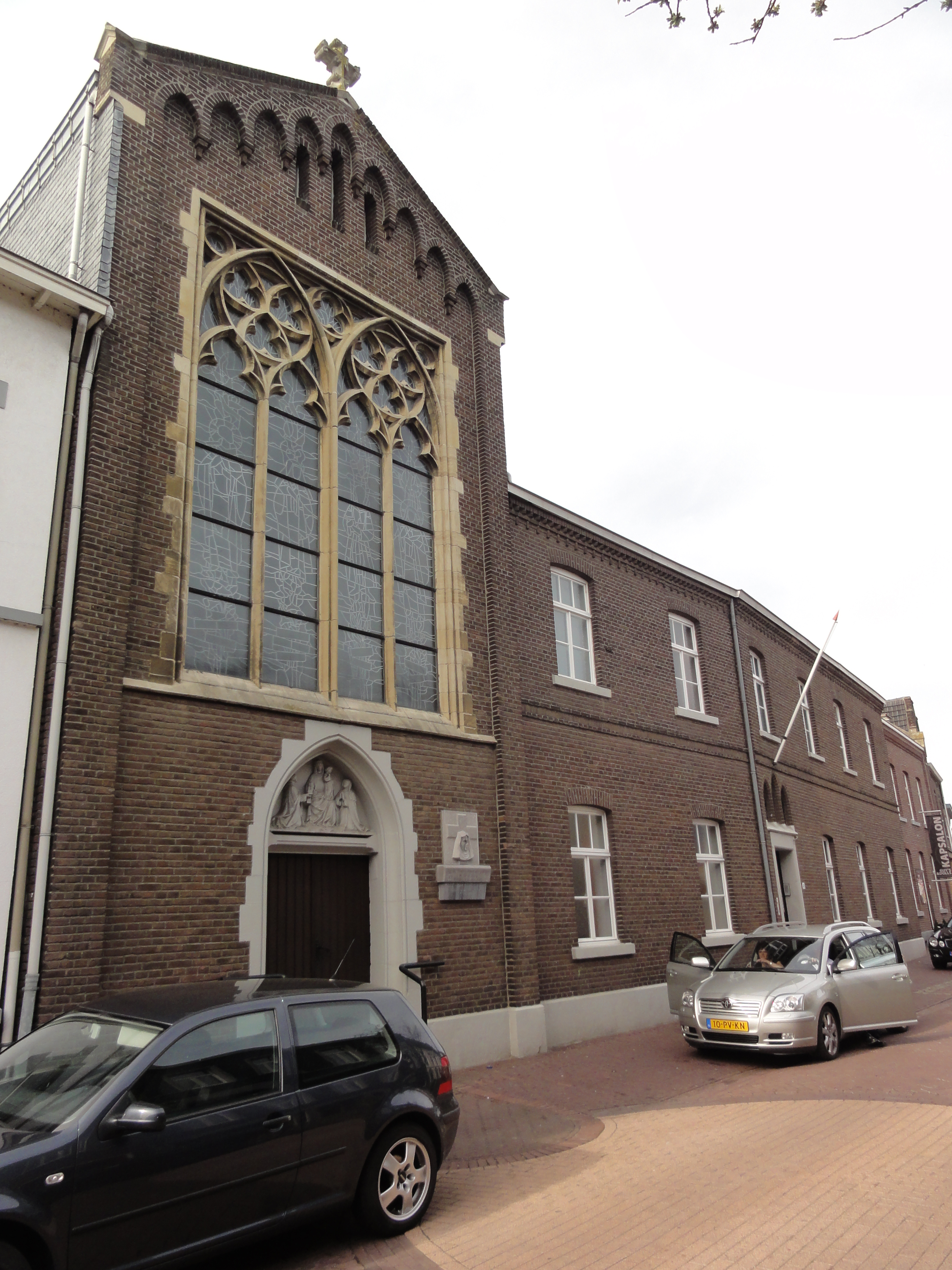
The Carmelite monastery in Echt

The Carmelite Monastery in Echt (Dutch: Karmelitessenklooster te Echt), in the province of Limburg, the Netherlands, also known as the Echt Carmel, is a community of Discalced Carmelite nuns established in 1879.

== History ==
In 1875, 20 Carmelite nuns from the monastery of Saint Joseph near St. Gereon's Basilica in Cologne settled in Echt because of the Kulturkampf in Germany. In 1879–80, the convent, including a neo-Gothic chapel, was built by Pierre Cuypers.

The site consists of four buildings within a rectangular courtyard. There is also a walled garden surrounded by vaults. The chapel is characterized by a large rectangular window on the street side with sandstone tracery. Above the door is a tympanum depicting Mary with the Infant Jesus being adored by a Carmelite priest and nun. Nearby is a monument to Edith Stein (Saint Theresa Benedicta of the Cross) who lived here from 1938 to 1942, when she was murdered by the Nazis in Auschwitz concentration camp.

The monastery is registered as a rijksmonument.
