= Ien Lucas =

Dutch visual artist

- Born: 1955 (age 70–71); Echt, the Netherlands
- Education: De Academie voor Beeldende Vorming (Tilburg); Jan van Eyck Academie (Maastricht); Banff Art Centre (Banff, Canada)
- Occupation: Visual artist
- Known for: Abstract painting

Ien Lucas (born 1955, Echt, the Netherlands) is a Dutch visual artist.

Lucas creates her abstract paintings on canvas or wood using acrylic paint and a range of other materials regularly used in modern art. Her series of works called 'notes' depicts her research-driven approach in which she first runs trials of new designs on a small scale. Most of the larger pieces can directly be related to the research and paintings from the 'notes' series.

== Education ==
Ien Lucas studied visual arts at:

- De Academie voor Beeldende Vorming, Tilburg, the Netherlands
- Jan Van Eyck Academie, Maastricht, the Netherlands
- Banff Art Centre, Banff, Canada

Whilst at the various art schools, Ien Lucas was a student of some notable artists such as René Daniëls and Jan Dibbets. During her studies she focused on paintings but also experimented with textiles and other more experimental graphical techniques. This knowledge is reflected in her works as many are made using a range of different materials and techniques. Most paintings are without a title but some series have one single title that relates them to the materials or methods involved.

== Work ==
After completing her education, Ien Lucas was presented by the gallery Lambert Tegenbosch in Heusden aan de Maas, the Netherlands. “It is the peculiarity of abstract art and at the same time its justification: the meaning of a piece of art is not in what it represents, it is in its form, a form with no connection to the outside world but full of meaning” is what Lambert Tegenbosch wrote on Ien Lucas' work.

Her works can be found in the collection of the Bonnefanten Museum in Maastricht, the Dutch Ministry of Foreign Affairs and the Ministry of the Interior, the ABP, the Cees Dam collection, and at many companies in the Netherlands and abroad.

She is currently represented by galleries in the Netherlands and France, including:

- Galerie Ramakers, the Hague, the Netherlands
- Priveekollektie, Heusden aan de Maas, the Netherlands
- Galerie La Ferronniere, Paris, France

Lucas works and lives in two buildings of Lilbosch Abbey in Echt, Limburg, in the Netherlands.
