= Barry L. Zaret =

Nuclear cardiologist

Dr. Barry Lewis Zaret
- Born: October 3, 1940; Brooklyn, New York City, U.S.
- Died: October 22, 2022 (aged 82); Torrington, Connecticut, U.S.
- Employer: Yale School of Medicine
- Title: Chief of Cardiology
- Website: www.barryzaret.com

Barry Lewis Zaret (1940-2022) was an American cardiologist who helped to establish the specialism of non-invasive nuclear cardiology, and was the founding editor of the Journal of Nuclear Cardiology. He was also a painter and a poet.

== Early life and education ==
Zaret was born on October 3, 1940, in Brooklyn, New York City. He was born to Jewish parents who had, at the time, recently fled Europe and started a new life in New York. He went to a public high school before pursuing medicine at Queens College, now known as part of the City College of New York. After graduating in 1962, he went to the New York University School of Medicine.

== Career ==
=== Cardiology ===
In 1969, Zaret accepted a cardiology fellowship at Johns Hopkins Hospital and started studying under Richard Ross and Dick Conti. A major person involved in Zaret's career was Bill (William) Strauss. He met Strauss at Bellevue Hospital where they became good friends and later went on to complete their fellowships at Johns Hopkins Hospital together. As said in the Journal of Nuclear Cardiology, "Zaret and Strauss collaborated initially on a research project measuring coronary blood flow after the intracoronary injection of radioactive Xenon. While waiting for software to quantify coronary blood flow data, they realized that an ECG gating circuitry used for other purposes would allow for gated cardiac blood pool imaging in diastole and systole, using Tc-99m labeled albumin. This then would permit assessment of regional ventricular wall motion and measurement of global ejection fraction." This, being first published in 1971, was one of many breakthroughs these two would make together.

==== Military service ====
The same year this research was published, Zaret was drafted to the hospital at Travis Air Force Base in Sacramento Valley, CA. Strauss had started work there the previous year and continued their research together.

==== Career at Yale ====
Zaret completed his military service in 1973 and was recruited to the Yale University School of Medicine as an assistant professor of medicine and diagnostic radiology. He was then promoted to associate professor in 1976 and, in 1978, to full professor. In 1984, Zaret became the Robert W Berliner Professor of Medicine. He later served as chief of cardiology for 26 years, until 2004 and as associate chair of clinical affairs in the Department of Internal Medicine at Yale from 1994 to 2004.

=== Art and poetry ===
Zaret was also passionate about painting. After retiring as a cardiologist in 2017, he was able to lean into his love for the arts and his paintings have been displayed in the DaSilva Art Gallery.

Additionally, Zaret was an avid poet who often wrote about cardiology. His poetry was also described as being "refracted through a Jewish lens".

== Accomplishments ==
This is a non-exhaustive list of some of the accomplishments of Zaret.

- Founding editor-in-chief of the Journal of Nuclear Cardiology
- Credited with being one of the founders of the field of Nuclear cardiology
- One of the longest serving chiefs of cardiology at any U.S university hospital
- Published four poetry books
- Completed at least three marathons
- He was one of the founders and the second president of the Association of Professors of Cardiology

=== Awards and honors ===
- 1998 Solomon A. Berson Medical Alumni Achievement Award in Clinical Science
- 2007 Distinguished Service Award of the American Society of Nuclear Cardiology
- Earned the honor of Phi Beta Kappa in 1961

== Death ==
Zaret died at age 82 in a car accident on Route 8 in Torrington, Connecticut, in October 2022. His car plummeted off the overpass above Winthrop Street and crashed into a concrete wall, leading to him being pronounced dead at the scene.
