= Lilbosch Abbey =

Monastery near Echt, Netherlands

Coordinates: 51°5′0″N 5°54′53″E

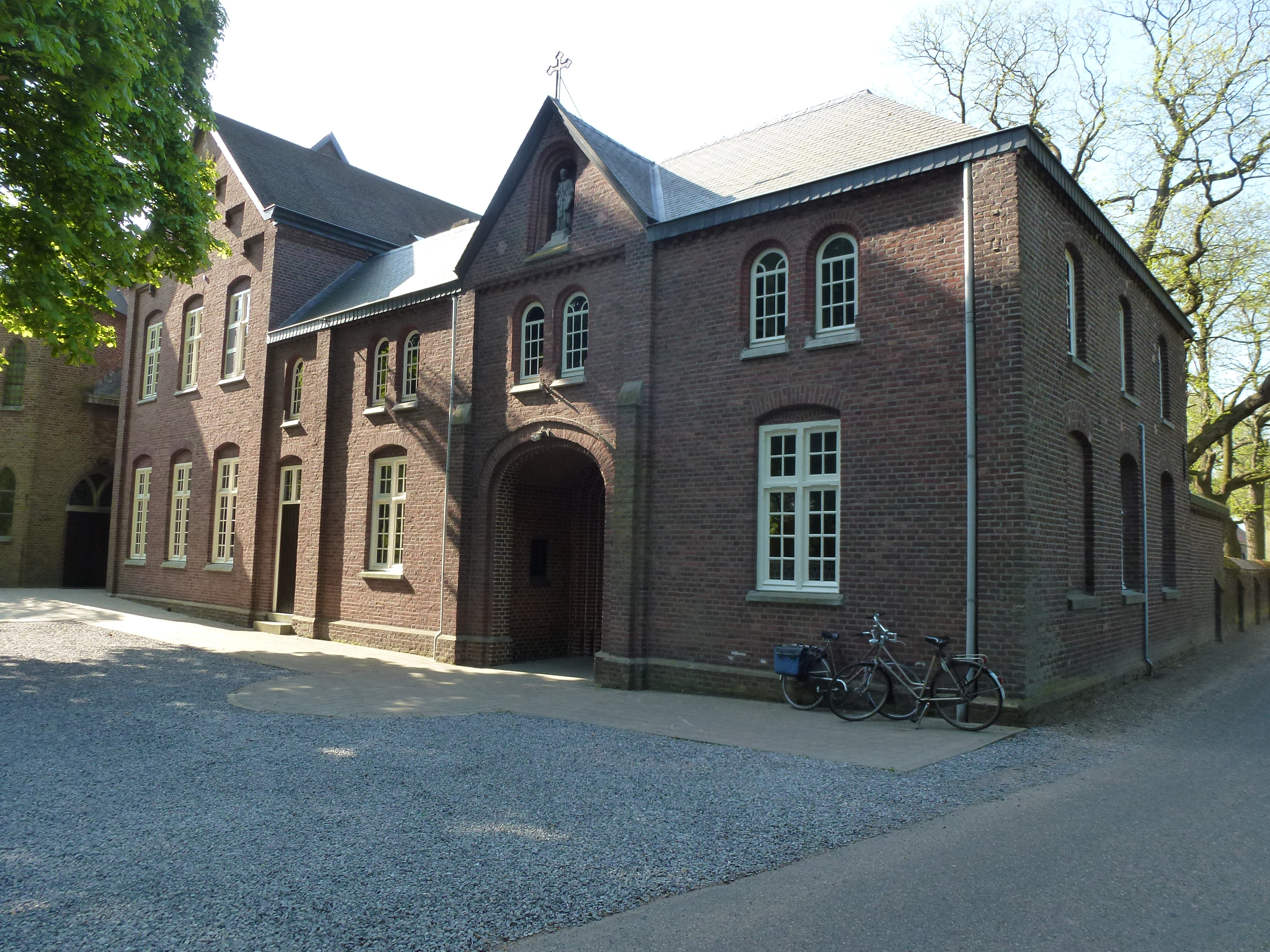
Main entrance, with the guest wing to the right

Lilbosch Abbey (Dutch: Abdij Lilbosch) is a monastery of the Trappists (Cistercians of the Strict Observance) founded in 1883 and located in Lilboscherveld in Pepinusbrug, Echt, Limburg, in the Netherlands.

The abbey is largely self-sufficient thanks to its own farm, which has an area of 110 hectares and supports not only the cultivation of crops but also free-range pig-keeping, calf-rearing and bee-keeping. The farming techniques are organic, as far as possible. Apart from the farmland the abbey has another 30 hectares or so of natural uncultivated land.

== History ==
Lilbosch Abbey was founded from Achel Abbey which at the time was receiving many applicants for admission. The third abbot of Achel, Dom Bernardus Maria van der Seyp, therefore looked for a new location for expansion. The choice fell on an area of marshy ground in the district of Echt. The founding group arrived in 1883. The new foundation flourished, and in 1912 Lilbosch was elevated to the status of an abbey.

Lilbosch owned a guest house built in 1890, which is now the Hof van Herstal restaurant.

The abbey has a chapel in a bunker and an aeroplane monument as memorials to World War II. In September 1942, a British Short Stirling bomber crashed into the nearby marshy land. Excavations to recover the remains of crew, retrieve surviving parts of the bomber, and potentially clear unexploded ordnance began in September 2019.

In 2003 another Cistercian monastery nearby, Ulingsheide Abbey in Tegelen, became an annex to Lilbosch Abbey. As of summer 2020 negotiations were ongoing for the sale of the property.

Lilbosch Abbey church was renovated in 2012–2013.

As of 2013 the community numbered 13 monks.

== Natura 2000 ==
The abbey is part of the Natura 2000 area "Abdij Lilbosch & voormalig Klooster Mariahoop" because of the colonies of bats.

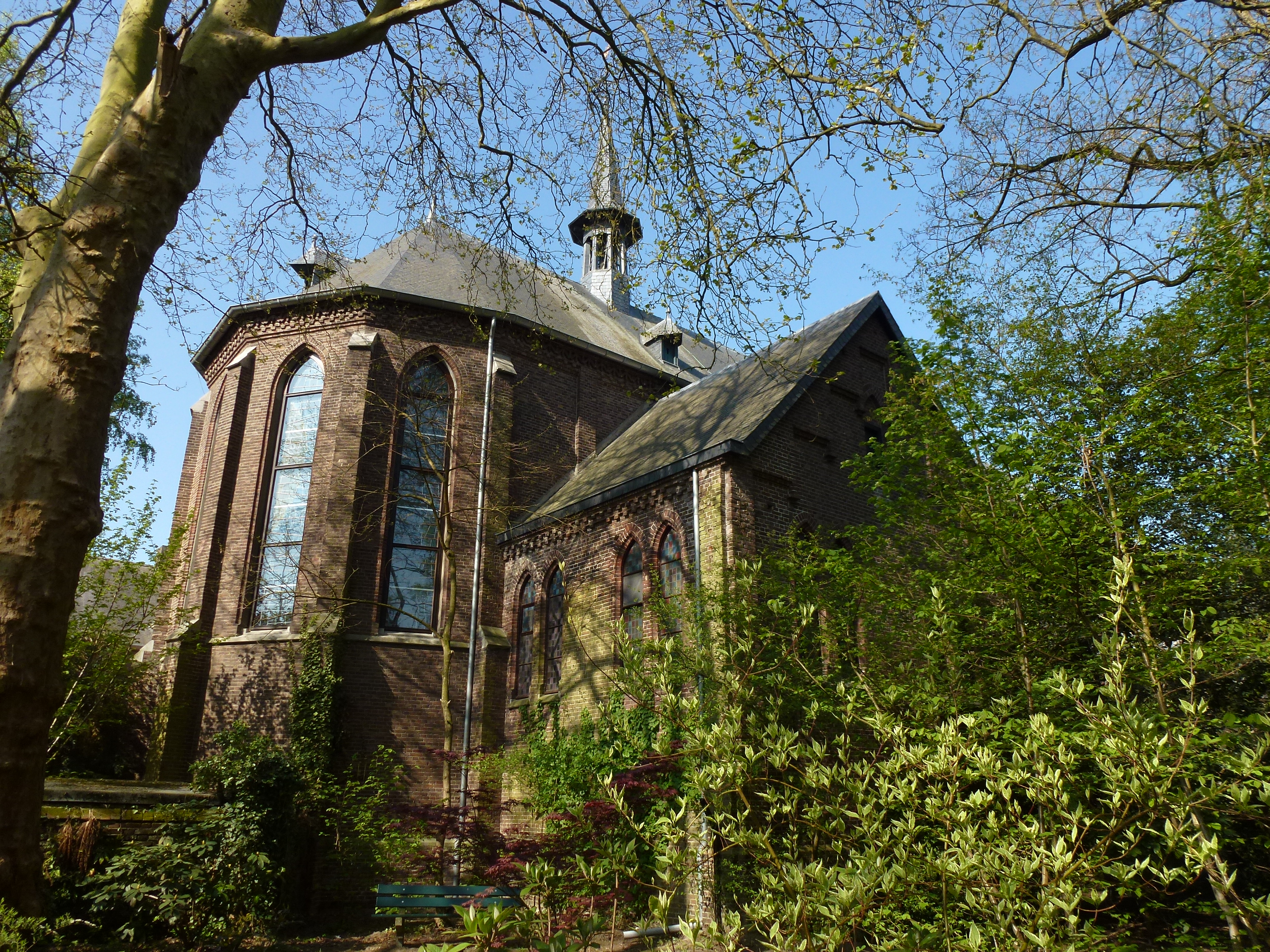
Abbey church (priests' choir)

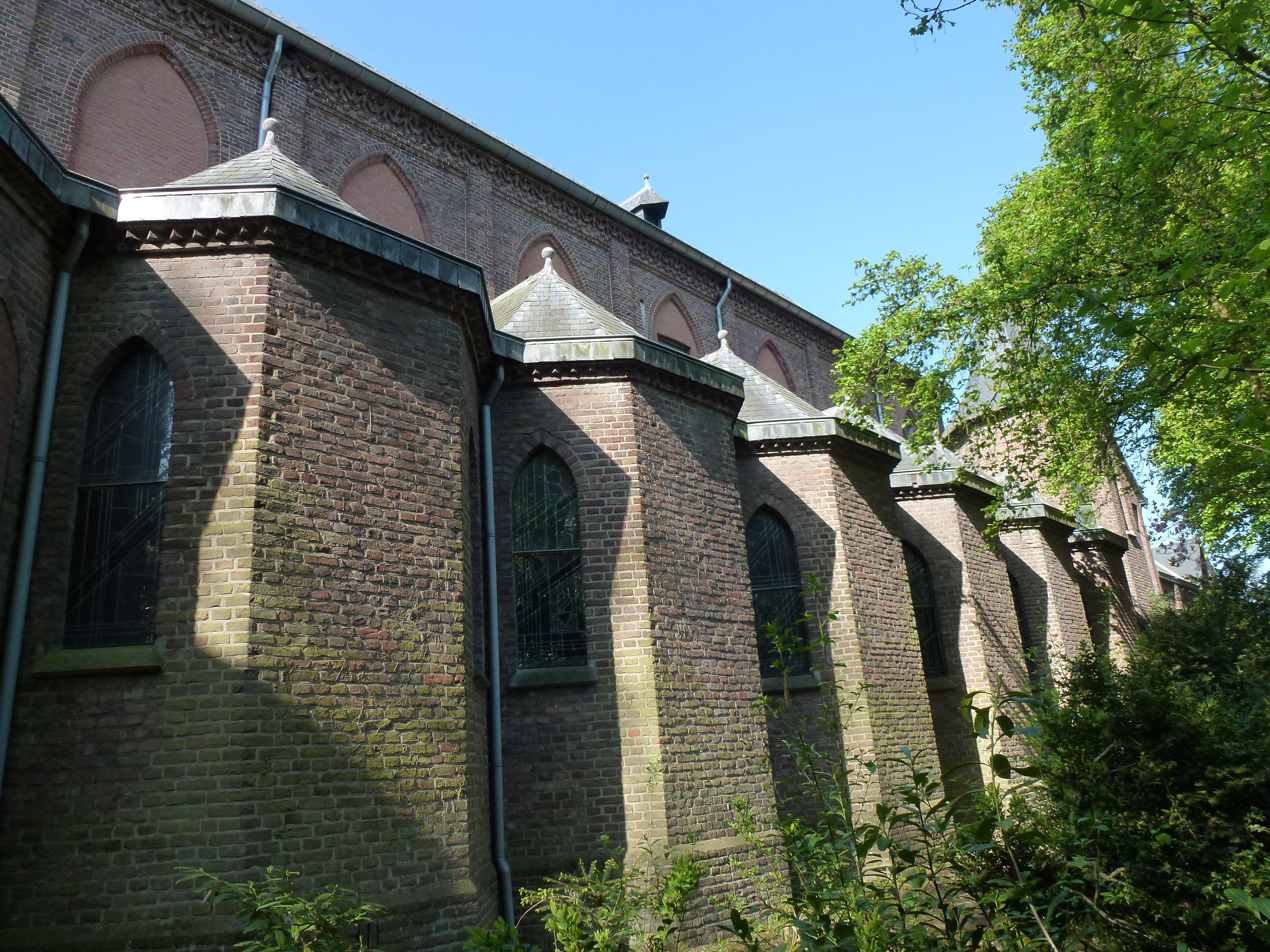
Abbey church (side chapels)

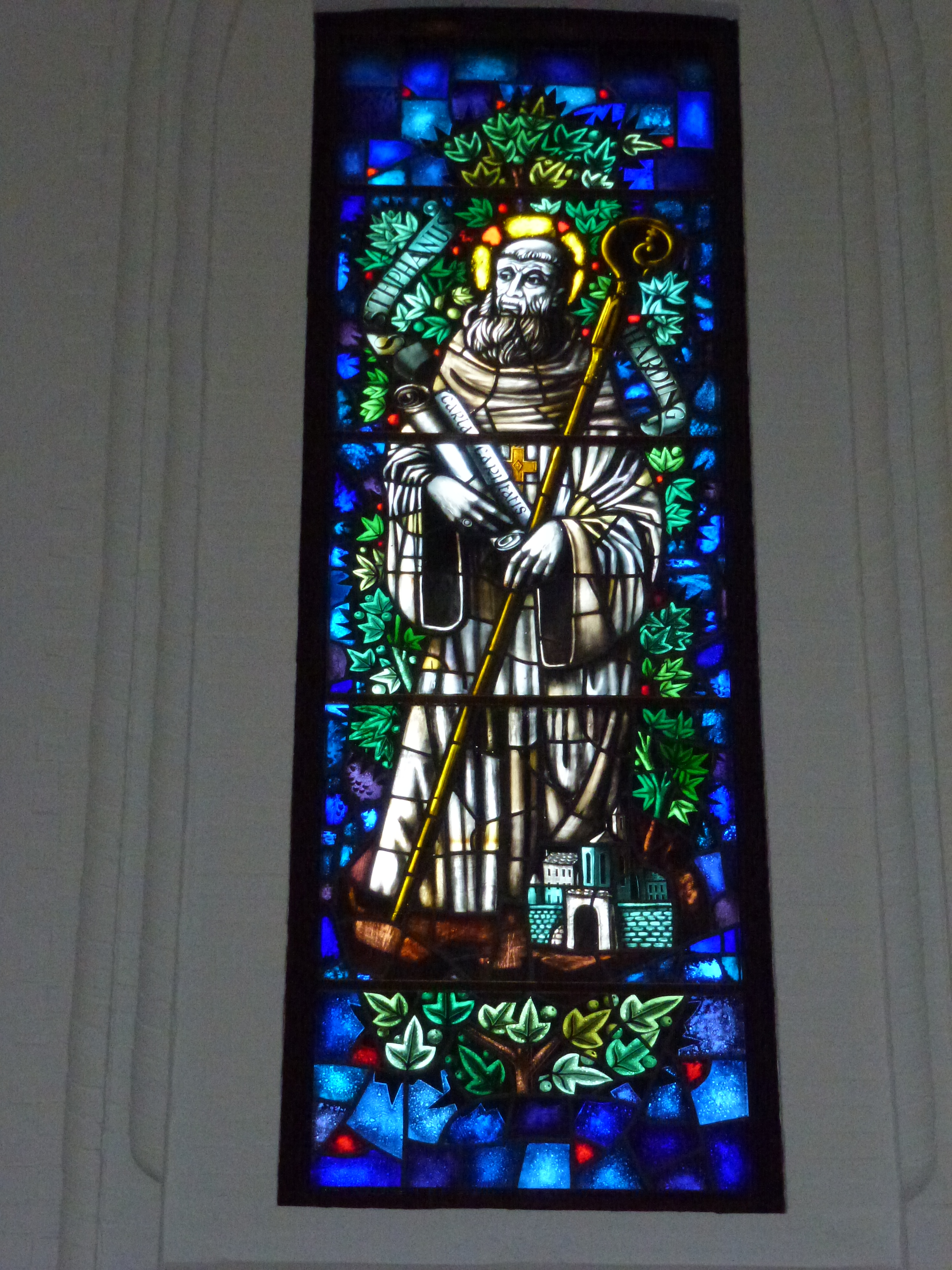
Abbey church (stained glass window)

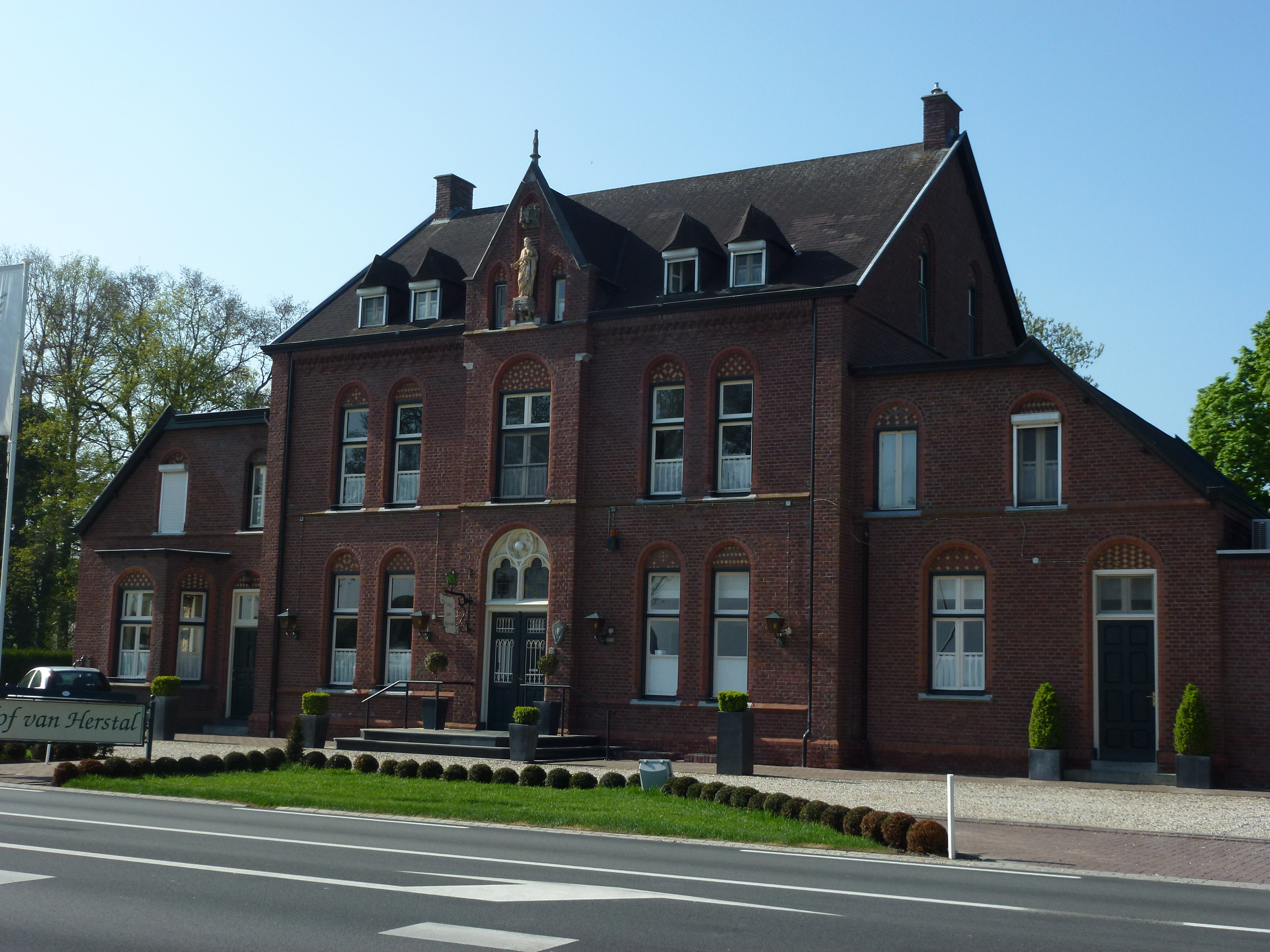
Hof van Herstal, the former guesthouse
