= Journal of Nuclear Cardiology =

- Discipline: Nuclear cardiology
- Language: English
- Edited by: Marcelo Di Carli

Publication details
- History: 1994-present
- Publisher: Elsevier
- Frequency: Monthly
- Impact factor: 2.7 (2024)

Standard abbreviations
- ISO 4: J. Nucl. Cardiol.

Indexing
- CODEN: JNCAE2
- ISSN: 1071-3581 (print); 1532-6551 (web)
- OCLC no.: 644625161

Links
- Journal homepage; Online archive; Journal page at society website

The Journal of Nuclear Cardiology is a peer-reviewed medical journal covering research in nuclear cardiology. It is published by Elsevier and is the official journal of the American Society of Nuclear Cardiology. The editor-in-chief is Marcelo Di Carli (Brigham and Women's Hospital). The founding editor was Barry L. Zaret (Yale University School of Medicine). According to the Journal Citation Reports, the journal has a 2025 impact factor of 3.0.

== Abstracting and indexing ==
This journal is abstracted and indexed by:

- Science Citation Index Expanded
- PubMed/MEDLINE
- Scopus
- Embase
- CINAHL
- Current Contents/Clinical Medicine
