= Echt, Netherlands =

Echt Ech (Limburgish)
- City
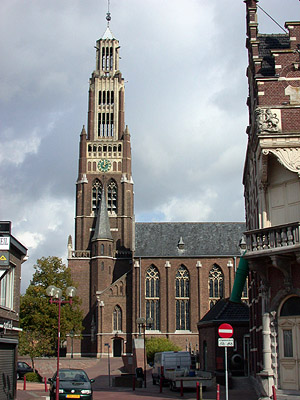
- The Sint-Landricuskerk

- Flag Coat of arms

- Location in the Netherlands Location in the province of Limburg in the Netherlands
- Coordinates: 51°06′N 5°53′E
- Country: Netherlands
- Province: Limburg
- Municipality: Echt-Susteren

Area
  - Total: 12.35 km^{2} (4.77 sq mi)
- Elevation: 26 m (85 ft)

Population (2021)
  - Total: 7,655
  - Density: 619.8/km^{2} (1,605/sq mi)
- Time zone: UTC+1 (CET)
  - Summer (DST): UTC+2 (CEST)
- Postal code: 6101
- Dialing code: 0475

Echt (Dutch: [ɛxt]; Limburgish: Ech [ˈæx]) is a city in the Dutch municipality of Echt-Susteren in the province of Limburg, Netherlands. It was a municipality itself until it merged with the municipality of Susteren on 1 January 2003.

The municipality of Echt had about 19,300 inhabitants and an area of about 75,13 square km.

== History ==
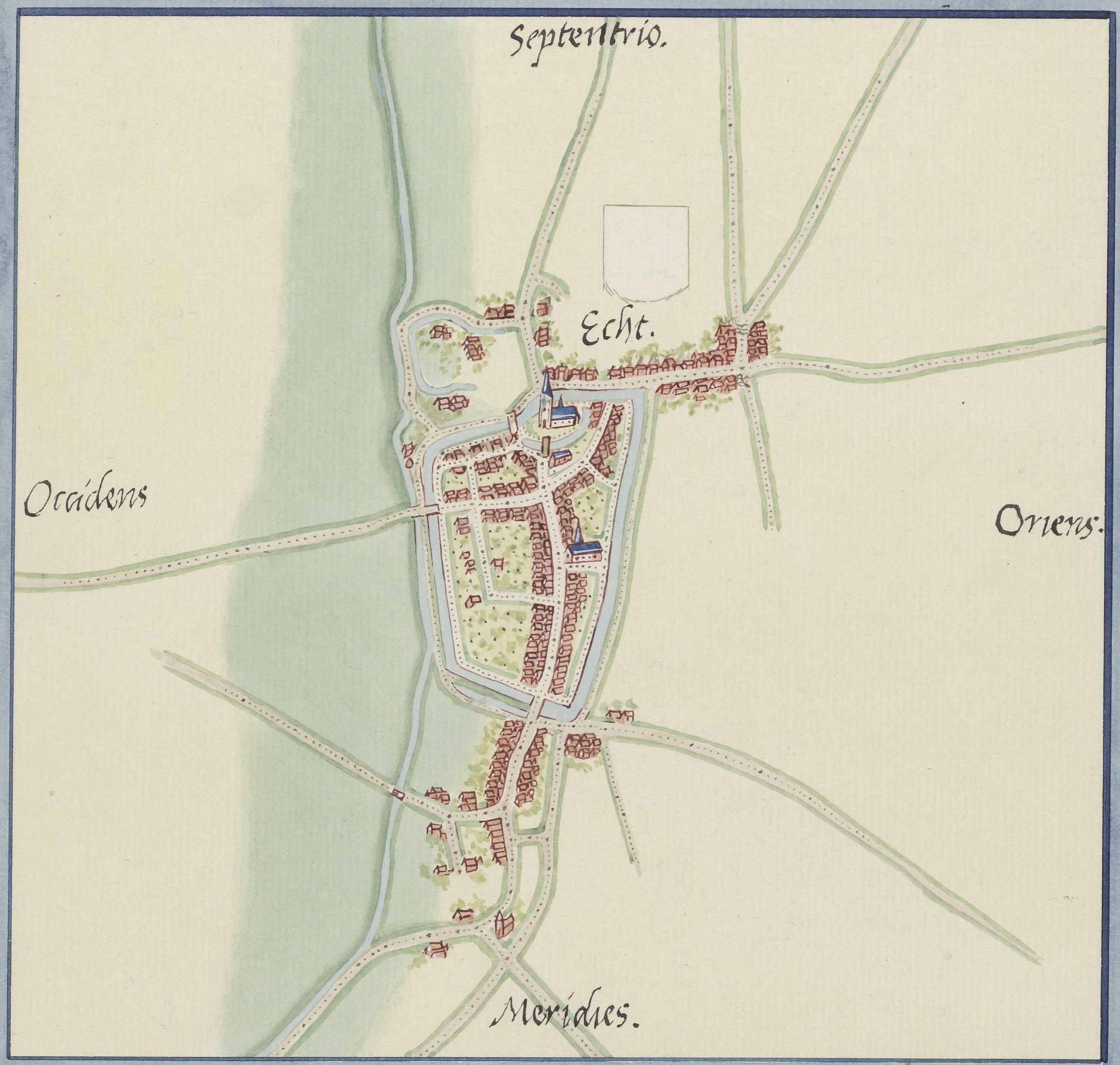
Map of Echt by Jacob van Deventer, c. 1550

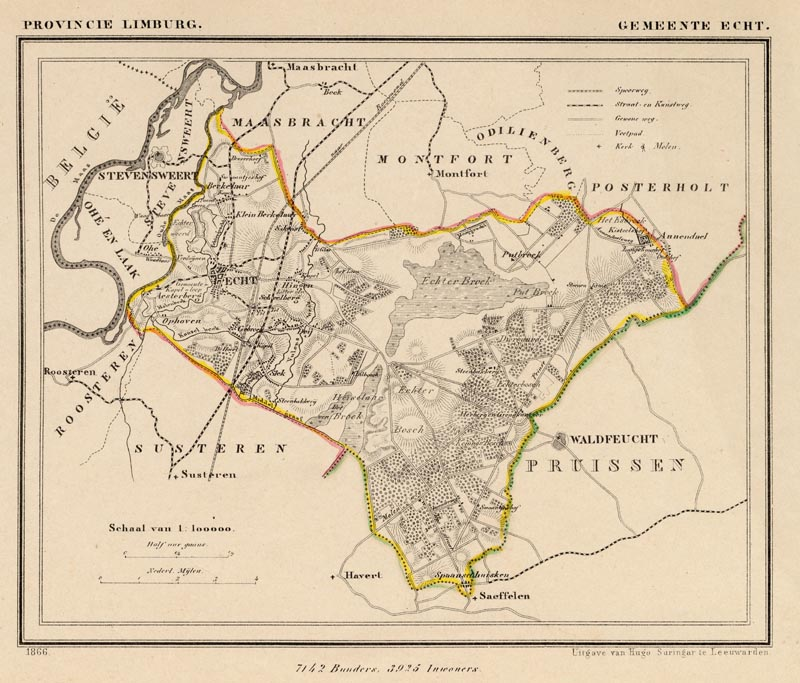
Echt in 1866

First recorded in the 7th century, Echt was a village, then within the County of Loon. Between 928 and 939 Gerberga of Saxony gave the estate of "Ettha" and its church to the St Servatius community in Maastricht.

In 1075/1076 Gerard I of Guelders, received the estate of Echt on loan from Albert III, Count of Namur and deputy duke of Lower Lorraine. However, a charter from Emperor Henry IV from 1087 gives a different picture of this donation: according to the Godschalk van Aken, Gerard I of Guelders is said to have illegally taken possession of the church of Echt ("Echta") ("invaserat"), while this belonged to the St. Servatius Chapter. By judgment of the imperial court of Aachen ("Aquisgrani") the church of Echt was returned to the Maastricht chapter.

The aldermen of Echt, who had their own seal, are mentioned first on 29 June 1259. A source from 1590 shows Echt as a "Minderstädteof" (small town) within the States of Upper Guelders. Small towns were legally and economically less privileged than large cities such as Roermond. Nevertheless, it had a wall with gates, a hospital and cloth hall. A city moat was constructed after the second half of the 13th century. In May 1397, during a war between Brabant and Gelderland, the people of Liège destroyed the fortified town. In 1473 the city was conquered by Charles the Bold, while in 1497 Maximilian I took its castle. However, the city was recaptured by Guelders shortly thereafter. In 1556, during the Eighty Years' War, it was looted by mercenaries in the Spanish army. It then changed occupiers several times and suffered waves of destruction. Of the old fortifications only the canals were left by the end of the war.

After significant depopulation caused by wars and plagues, Echt was usually considered to be a village. Only after 1630 was it again consistently referred to as city, even by its own aldermen.

At the Treaty of Utrecht, ending the War of the Spanish Succession in 1713, Echt became part of the United Provinces together with Venlo and Montfort. In 1795 Guelders was finally conquered and incorporated by the French First Republic, and partitioned between the départements of Roer and Meuse-Inférieure

== Sights ==
- Sint Landricuskerk, a Catholic hall church in Gothic style.
- Lilbosch Abbey (Dutch: Abdij Lilbosch) a monastery of the Trappists.
- Carmelite Monastery, founded 1879, known for Edith Stein
- Huis Verduynen, a moated mansion first mentioned in 1400 and rebuilt in 1667
- Sint-Rochus chapel, founded in 1686 and rebuilt in 1910
- Chapel of Our Lady, a 17h-century chapel
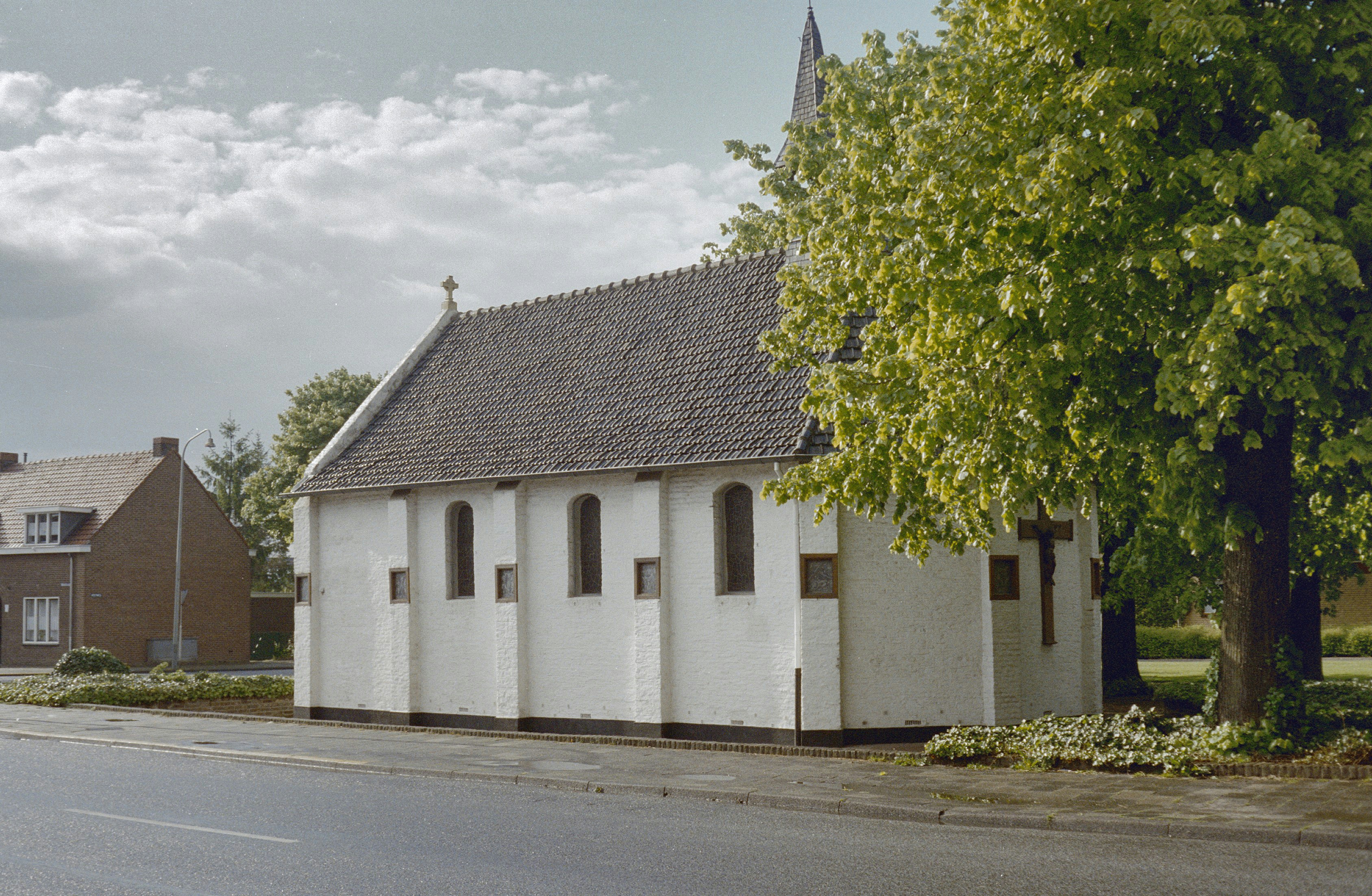
Chapel of Our Lady

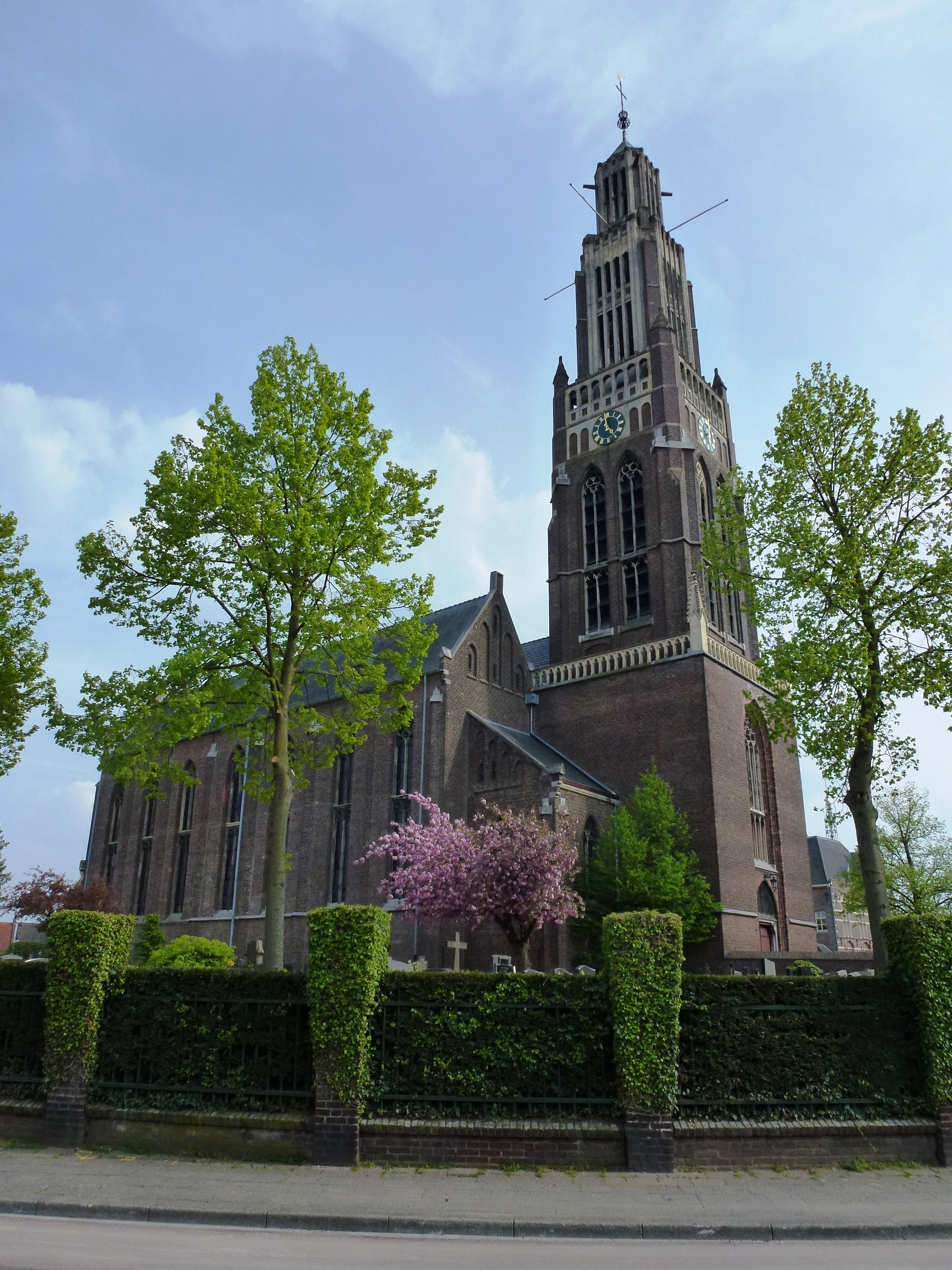
Northwest side of the Saint Landricuskerk

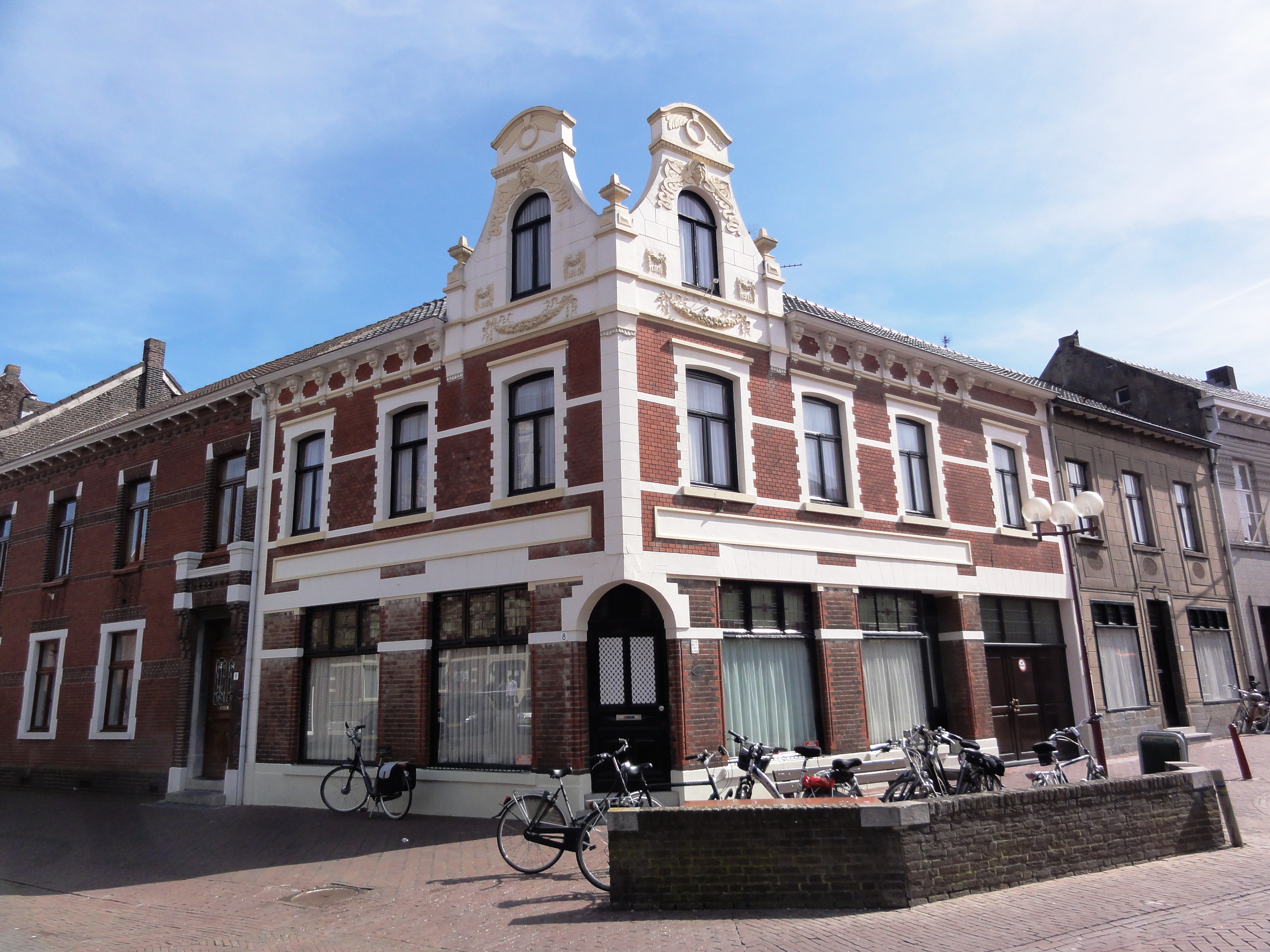
Corner house in Echt

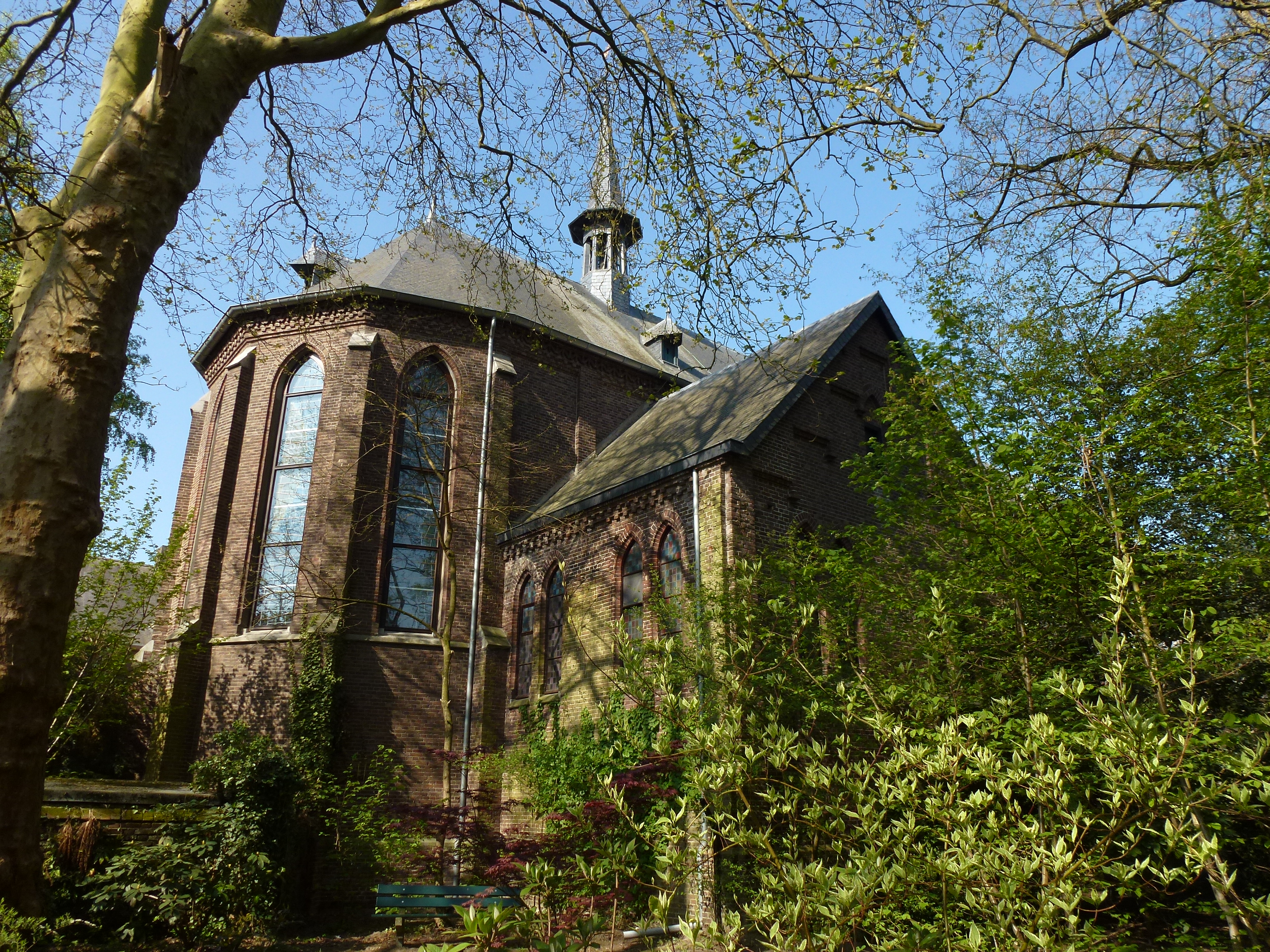
Priests' choir in Lilbosch Abbey

== Economy ==
From the late 19th century, Echt was the centre of an important roof tile industry.

There are two business parks in Echt, namely De Berk, and De Loop.

== Nature and landscape ==
Echt is located on the Maas river, at a height of about 28 meters. To the west of Echt are industrial estates, a motorway and the Juliana Canal. To the east, the hamlets of Schilberg and Hingen and the church village of Pey are attached to Echt. Other nearby hamlets include Gebroek, Slek and Ophoven to the south, Aasterberg to the west, and Berkelaar to the north.

== Transportation ==
- Echt is near the A2 and A73 highways.
- Echt railway station is served by NS: Dutch Railways (Dutch: Nederlandse Spoorwegen)
- Echt has its own quay on the Juliana Canal.

== Notable people ==
- Piet van den Brekel (1932–1999) a Dutch racing cyclist
- Annefleur Bruggeman (born 1997) a Dutch handball player
- Rob Ehrens (born 1957) a Dutch equestrian
- Maud Hawinkels (born 1976) a Dutch TV presenter
- Adrian van Hooydonk (born 1964) a Dutch automobile designer
- Theo van der Leeuw (born 1949) a Dutch racing cyclist
- Ien Lucas (born 1955) a Dutch visual artist
- Ria Oomen-Ruijten (born 1950) a Dutch politician
- Ben Scheres (born 1960) a Dutch developmental biologist
- Laurence Stassen (born 1971) a Dutch politician
- Edith Stein (1891–1942) a German Jewish philosopher who converted to Catholicism and became a nun
- Sef Vergoossen (born 1947) a Dutch football manager
- Jacques Verheyen (1911–1989) a Dutch glazier and painter
- Frans Wackers (born 1939) a medical doctor and research scientist

== See also ==
- Echt-Susteren
