= Pey, Netherlands =

Pey Pej Peij
- Village
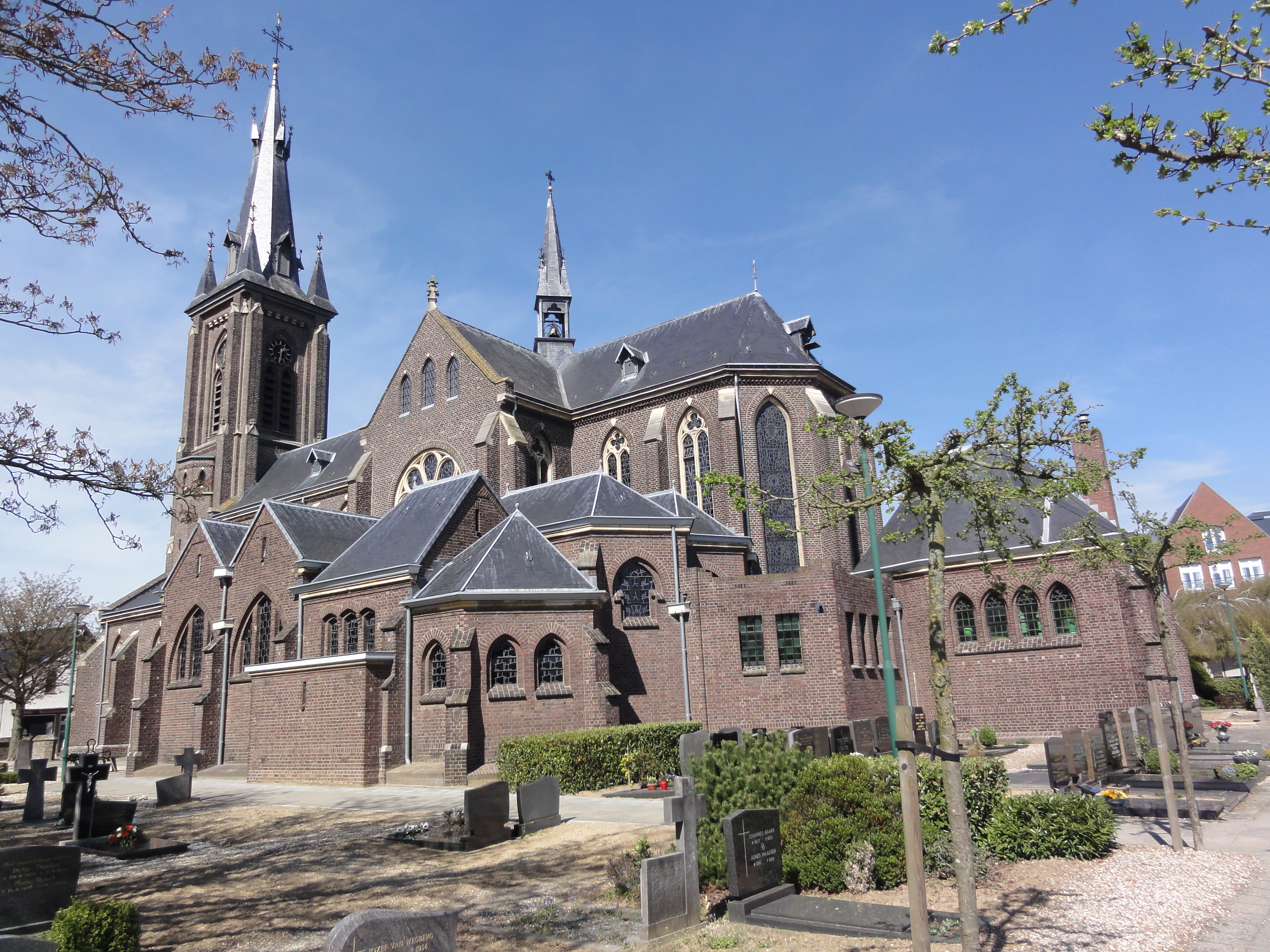
- Our Lady of Immaculate Conception Church

- Location in the Netherlands Location in the province of Limburg in the Netherlands
- Coordinates: 51.0988°N 5.8844°E
- Country: Netherlands
- Province: Limburg
- Municipality: Echt-Susteren

Area
  - Total: 7.28 km^{2} (2.81 sq mi)
- Elevation: 30 m (98 ft)

Population (2021)
  - Total: 6,045
  - Density: 830/km^{2} (2,150/sq mi)
- Time zone: UTC+1 (CET)
  - Summer (DST): UTC+2 (CEST)
- Postal code: 6102
- Dialing code: 0475

Pey (also: Peij; Limburgish: Pej) is a village in the Dutch province of Limburg. It is a part of the municipality of Echt-Susteren. It is located to the east of the Echt and is separated from Echt by the railway line. It is located about 11 kilometres (6.8 mi) north of Sittard.

== History ==
The village was first mentioned in 1403 as Pede, and means "swamp". The popular interpretation as peace is not correct. The official spelling of the village is Pey, but Peij is still often used. Pey is a road village which started to develop in the 19th century on the road from Echt to Waldfeucht, Germany.

The Catholic Our Lady of Immaculate Conception Church is three aisled basilica church in Gothic Revival style. It was built between 1856 and 1861, and was designed by Pierre Cuypers. Between 1927 and 1928, annexes were added to the church and were designed by Joseph Cuypers. The war damage was repaired between 1947 and 1948.

Pey was home to 434 people in 1840. It has formed a single urban area with neighbouring Echt. Even though it is still considered an independent village, the place name signs were changed in 2012 to Echt on top and Pey below, and the village started to disappear from the directional signs. The inhabitants have been protesting, because they are fearing an annexation. In 2018, a community house was built in Pey.

== Transport ==
In 1862, the Echt railway station opened on the Maastricht to Venlo railway line.
