= Walem =

Walem may refer to:

- Walem, Belgium, village in the municipality of Mechelen
- Walem, Netherlands, hamlet near Valkenburg in Limburg
- Johan Walem, football player
