= Valkenburg Castle =

Ruined castle in Valkenburg aan de Geul, Netherlands

Castle of Valkenburg
- Valkenburg, the Netherlands
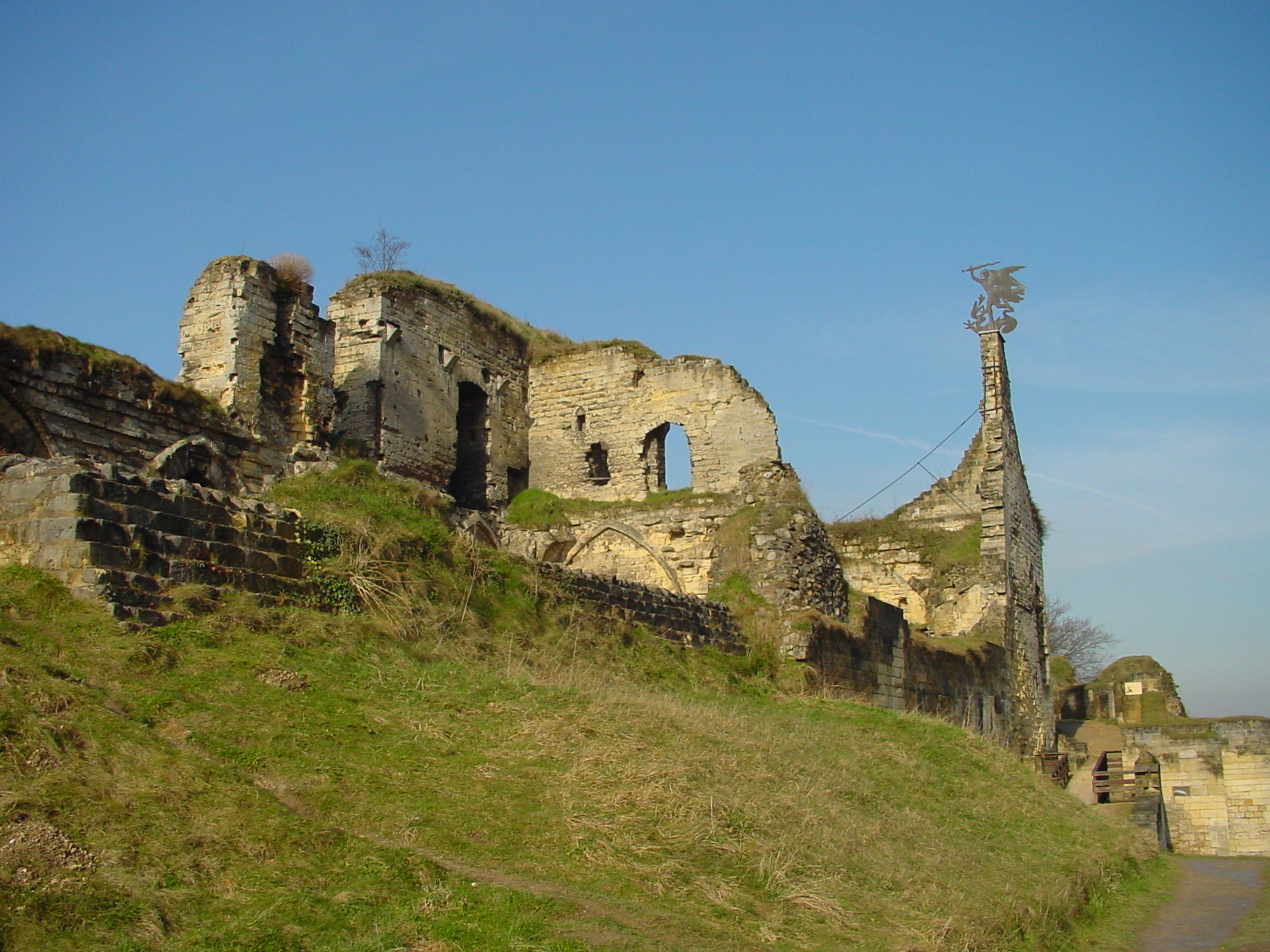
- Ruined castle of Valkenburg

Site information
- Type: Castle
- Owner: Foundation Velvet caves and Castle ruins Valkenburg
- Open to the public: Yes
- Condition: Ruine

Location
- The Netherlands
- Location within Netherlands
- Coordinates: 50°51′43″N 5°49′52″E

Site history
- Built: 1115, 14th century
- Built by: Lord van Suilen en Anholt
- Materials: Dutch Marlstone (mergel) and wood.
- Demolished: 1122 & 1672

Valkenburg Castle is a ruined castle in Valkenburg aan de Geul, Netherlands. It is unique in the Netherlands in that it is the only castle in the Netherlands built on a hill. The ruins suggest that the castle was once surrounded by a moat. The castle is listed in the top hundred of Dutch cultural monuments.

== History ==
In the year 1115, fortifications were erected at the site by Gosewijn I, Lord of Valkenburg. This original wooden keep survived until 1122 when it was destroyed under siege by Henry V, Holy Roman Emperor. The castle was rebuilt in the following centuries but was again destroyed in a siege, this time by John III, Duke of Brabant. The current ruins are those of the castle destroyed in 1672.

In 1937 during restorations of the castle it was discovered that there are secret passageways below the castle. These passages were used for knights during sieges. The Velvet Cave is a major attraction of the Valkenburg castle. The cave was hidden below Valkenburg castle. The cave was used by the block cutters to mine out the marlstone. There were multiple uses for the cave in the 11th and 12th century, later the cave was used as a shelter and hideout for the villagers in World War Two. The castle also has its very own chapel in the cave. The chapel was one of the places where Mass would be held. The cave also would have escape routes from the castle the routes where created for to be able to escape during the sieges that had happened twice to the castle. The routes were also used to store food.

The castle suffered heavily in the Dutch Spanish war as it wasn't built to withstand the new heavy duty cannons and mortars. The Spanish armies severely crippled the defensive walls of Valkenburg and left the castle in a far state of disrepair with its magnificent towers now collapsed and its roofs burned to ashes. The Dutch armies attempted to repair the castle but were unsuccessful due to the ongoing wars with the Spaniards and the French.

The castle had takeovers from sieges in 1465, 1568, 1632, and 1672 from King Stadtholder Willem lll. This was the last destruction of the castle. The castle was slighted during the Franco-Dutch War, in 1672, by the army of Stadtholder Willem III (the later King of England) to prevent it falling into French hands. Excavation of the site has revealed various rebuild periods through the centuries that can be tracked by color and materials changes in the structure. The history of the ruins can be traced through these phases of rebuilding.

After the destruction in 1672, the castle was in ruin until growing tourism pushed officials to consider reconstruction and preservation. Efforts were inspired by the push to rebuild the country after World War 2, which continued through the 20th century.

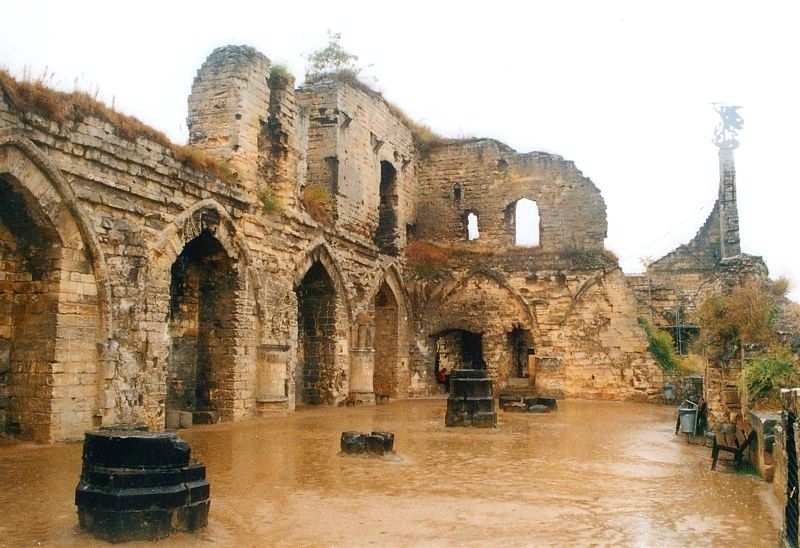
knights hall

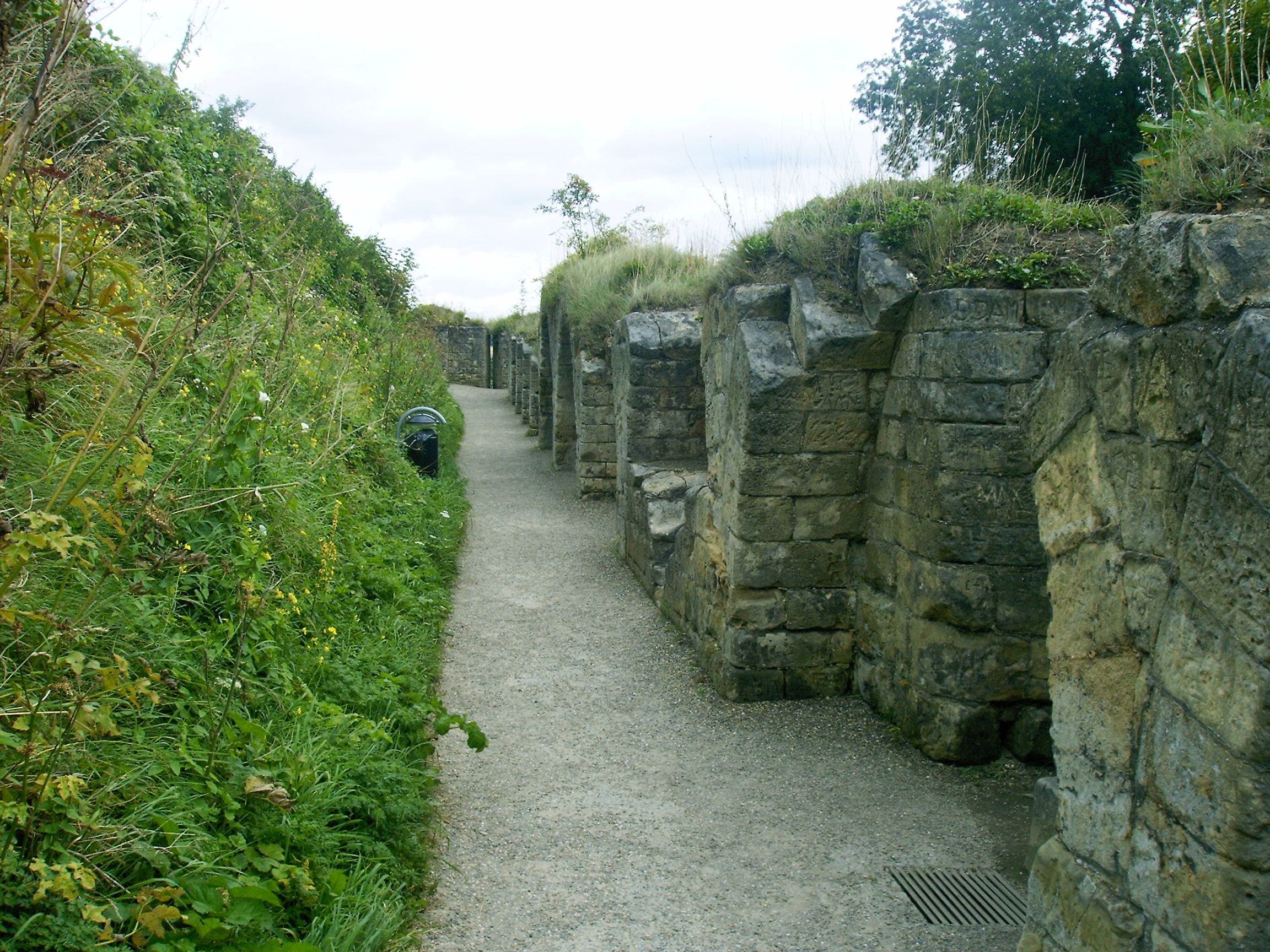
Castle Valkenburg

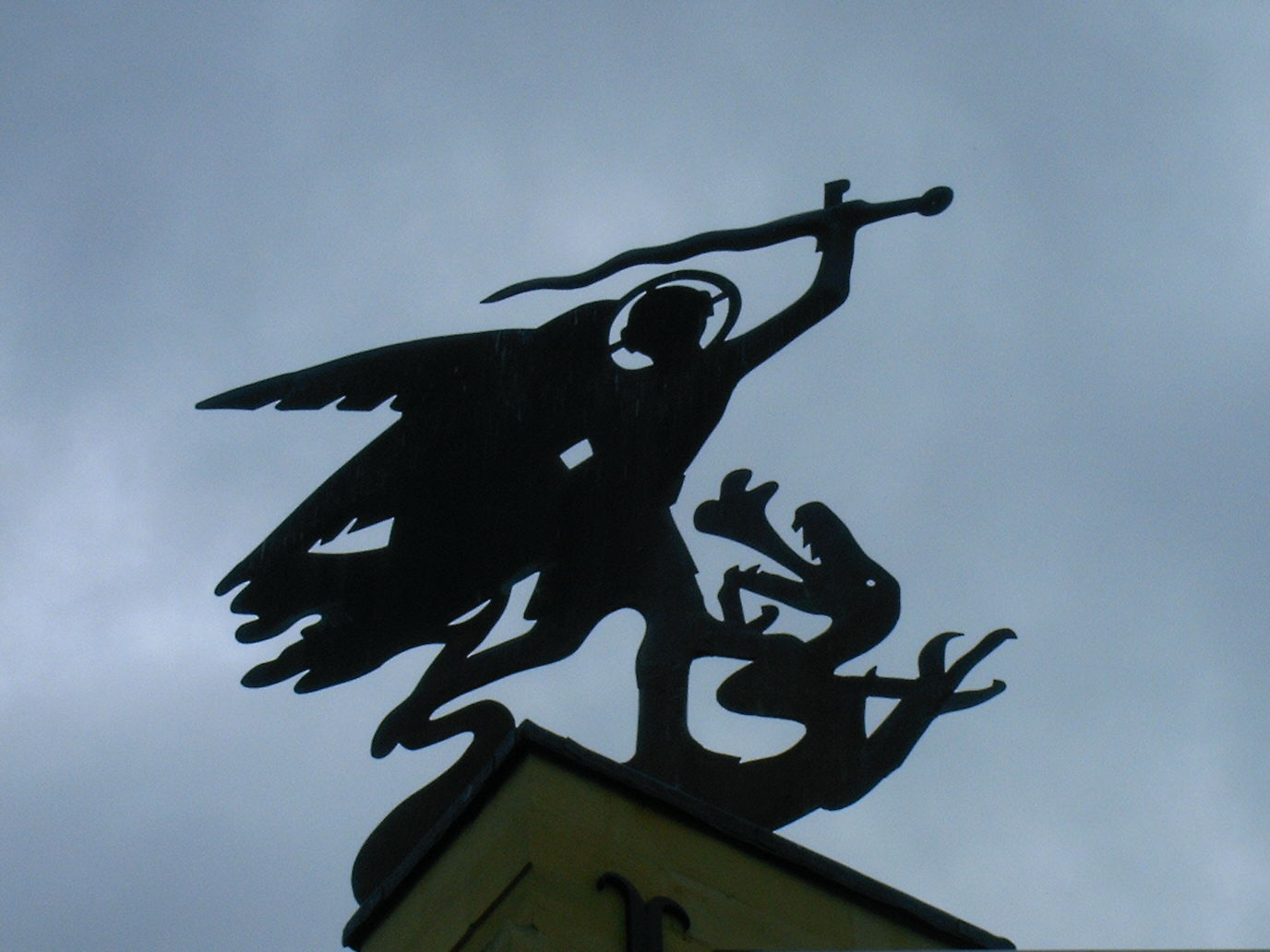
Castle Valkenburg

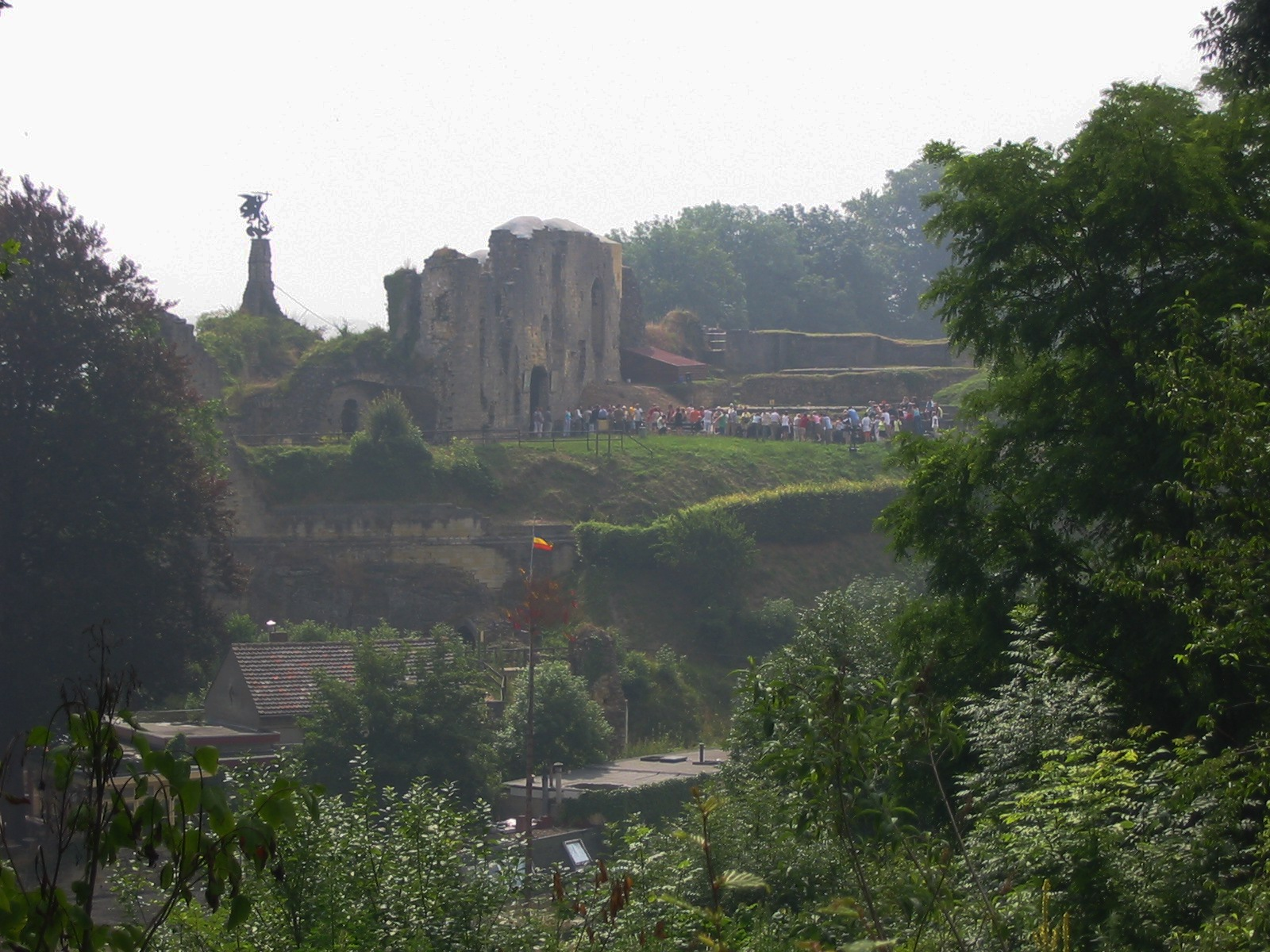
Castle Valkenburg

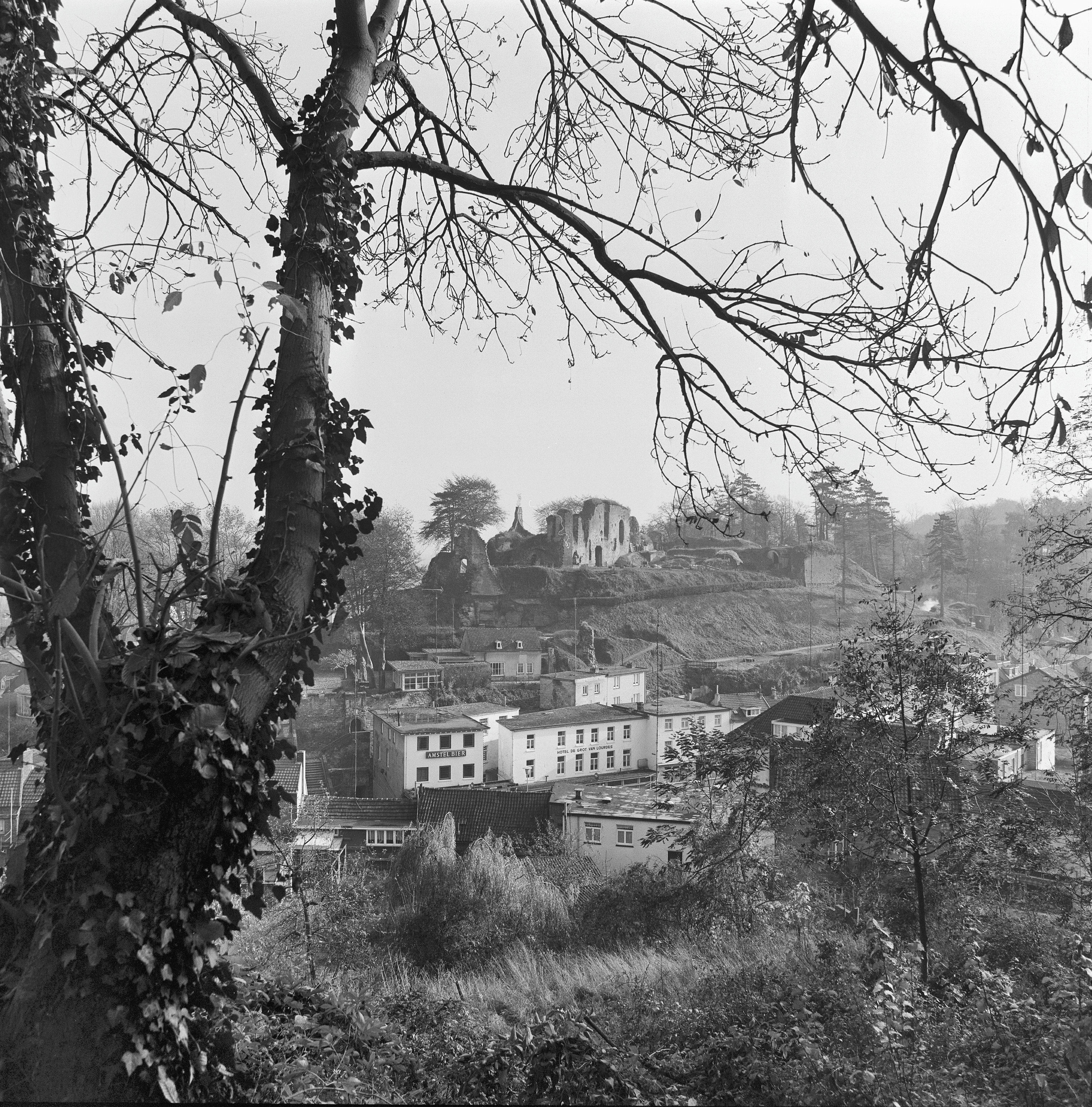

== See also ==
- List of castles in the Netherlands
