= Raymond Barion =

Dutch painter

Raymond Barion (born 1946, Valkenburg aan de Geul) is a Dutch artist who lives and works in Antwerp, Belgium. For the past 40 years he has been making art in the form of paintings, sculptures and work on paper.

== Biography ==
Barion studied sculpture at the National Institute for Fine Arts in Antwerp and earned his master's degree in Art History at Ghent University. After he graduated in 1974, he became a professor of contemporary art at the Academy of Art and Design St. Joost in Breda, the Netherlands. Barion worked here until his retirement in 2010.

Alongside his role as a professor, Barion has created numerous drawings, sculptures, and paintings. His paintings are usually very large and created with the airbrush technique. His paintings incorporate multiple spatial perspectives and other architectural elements.

In the 1980s Barion exhibited at the Technical University of Delft, the Technical University of Eindhoven, Freidus/Ordover Gallery in New York City and the International Cultural Center in Antwerp. In 2014 he had a solo exhibition at Extra City Kunsthal in Antwerp. His solo exhibition Isometric Landscapes (2016) at Upstream Gallery in Amsterdam received attention in the Dutch media.

== Selected exhibitions ==
- 'Parallel Perspectives', Kunstfort bij Vijfhuizen (2017)
- 'Less is a Bore', KAI 10, Arthena Foundation, Düsseldorf (2016)
- 'Isometric Landscapes', Upstream Gallery Amsterdam (2016)
- 'Machines Célibataires: 100 jaar later', Pictura Tekengenootschap, Dordrecht (2015)
- 'Of Lenses and Arenas', Extra City Kunsthal, Antwerpen (2014)
- 'Isometrische Landschappen', Technische Universiteit Eindhoven (1984)
- 'Machinale Metamorfosen', Technische Universiteit Delft (1983)
