= Geulhem =

- Hamlet
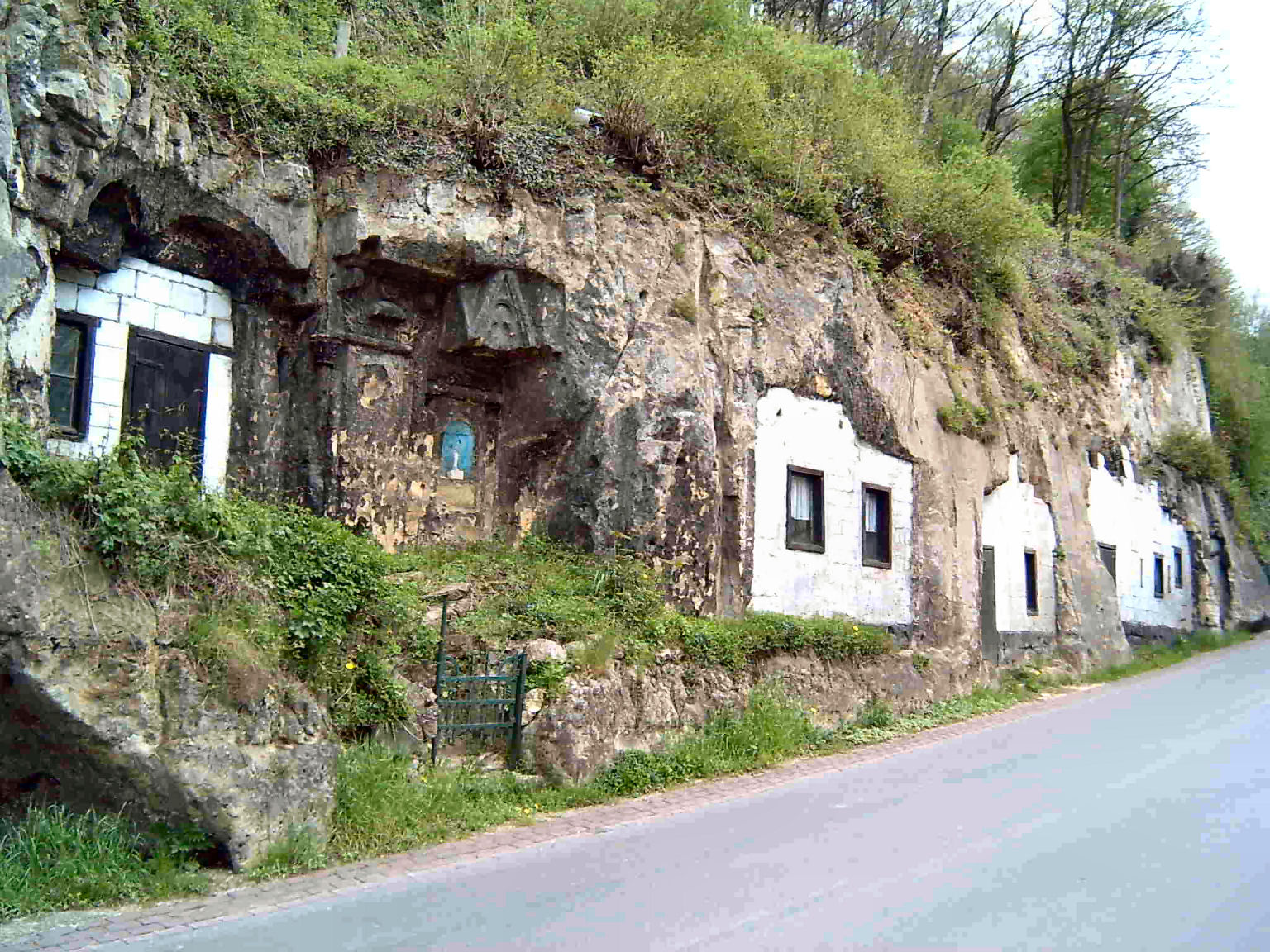
- Cave dwellings in Geulhem

- Location in the Netherlands Location in the province of Limburg in the Netherlands
- Coordinates: 50°52′6″N 5°47′0″E
- Country: Netherlands
- Province: Limburg
- Municipality: Valkenburg aan de Geul

Area
  - Total: 0.99 km^{2} (0.38 sq mi)
- Elevation: 123 m (404 ft)

Population (2021)
  - Total: 60
  - Density: 61/km^{2} (160/sq mi)
- Time zone: UTC+1 (CET)
  - Summer (DST): UTC+2 (CEST)
- Postal code: 6325
- Dialing code: 043

Geulhem is a rural hamlet in the south-eastern Netherlands, part of the former Berg en Terblijt council, now Valkenburg aan de Geul council. It is situated between Houthem and Berg en Terblijt.

== History ==
The name Geulhem was first mentioned in an act dating from 1360. The interpretation of the name is "hamlet on the river Geul". At the centre of Geulhem is its oldest building - the Geulhemmer watermill. This watermill existed before 1306. Geulhem is situated partially in a valley and partially on a hillside known as the Geulhemmerberg.

== Places of interest ==
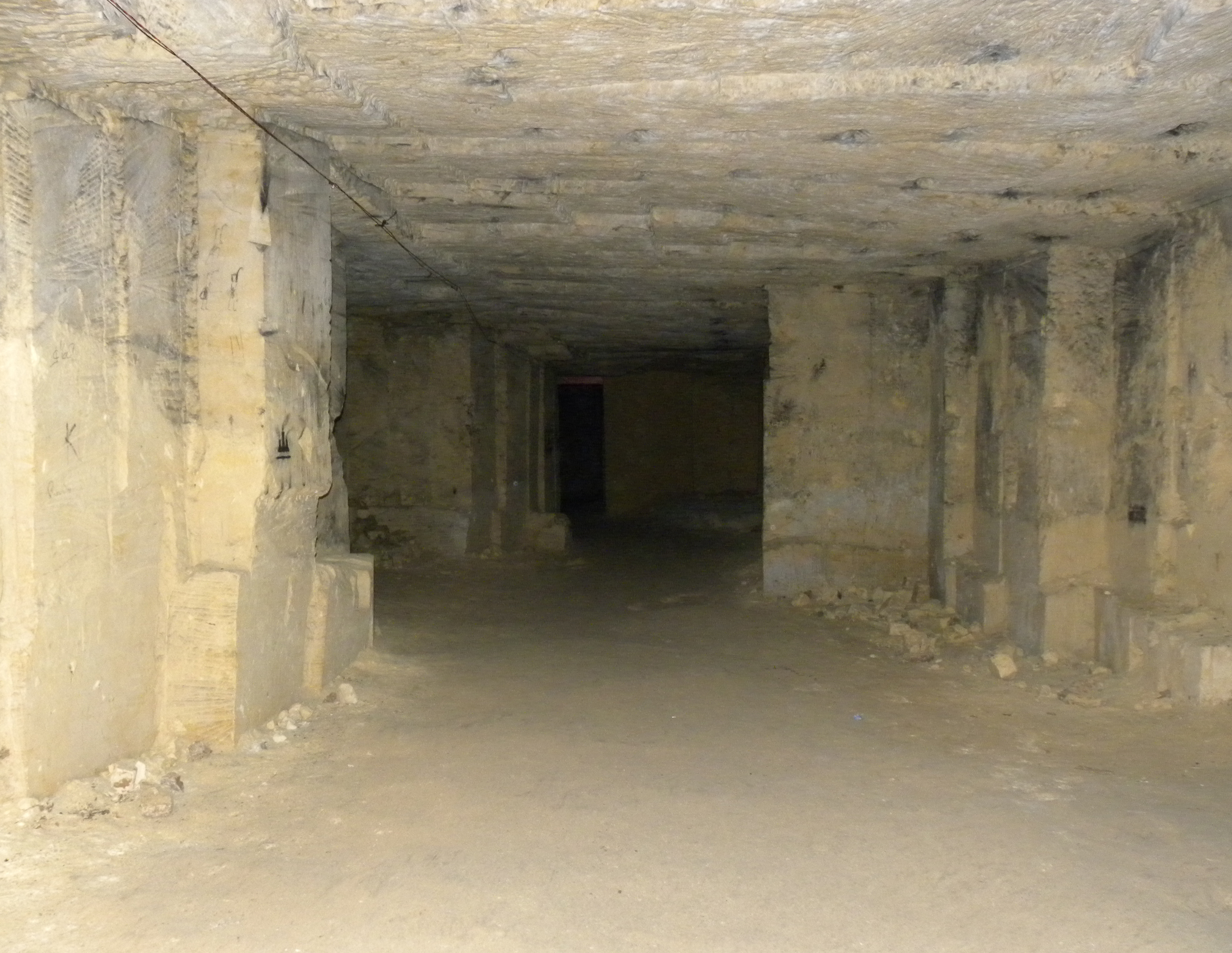
Geulhemmergroeve tunnels near Geulhem, The Netherlands.

Next to the Geulhemer watermill, which is now in use as a cafe, one finds themself in the environs of an underground network of corridors under the "Geulhemmerberg" hill. In the past, parts of this network were used as cave dwellings due to marl excavation. Part of the cave dwellings were restored and can be viewed on a group tour. At the entrance of the Geulhemmercave there is a marlstone statue of a 'block breaker' - the craftsman who, in the past, excavated blocks of marlstone with the help of primitive tools.

In Geulhem there is also a romantic castle - Castle Geulzicht - which was built at the end of the nineteenth century and is now in use as a hotel. It was developed by the architect Henri Reek and commissioned by Zuyderhoudt; its design is in the English Neo-Gothic style.

Geulhem is a popular holiday destination due its closeness to the sloped woods and the availability of many different hotels.

== Literature ==
Fons Heijnens, Houthem en St. Gerlach in de literatuur : een geannoteerde bibliografie over Houthem, Broekhem en Geulhem, hun inwoners en Sint Gerlach en zijn verering, Houthem 1993

Jan G.M. Notten, Geulhem has always been small, available to read via the link http://www.houthem.info
