= Oud-Valkenburg =

- Village
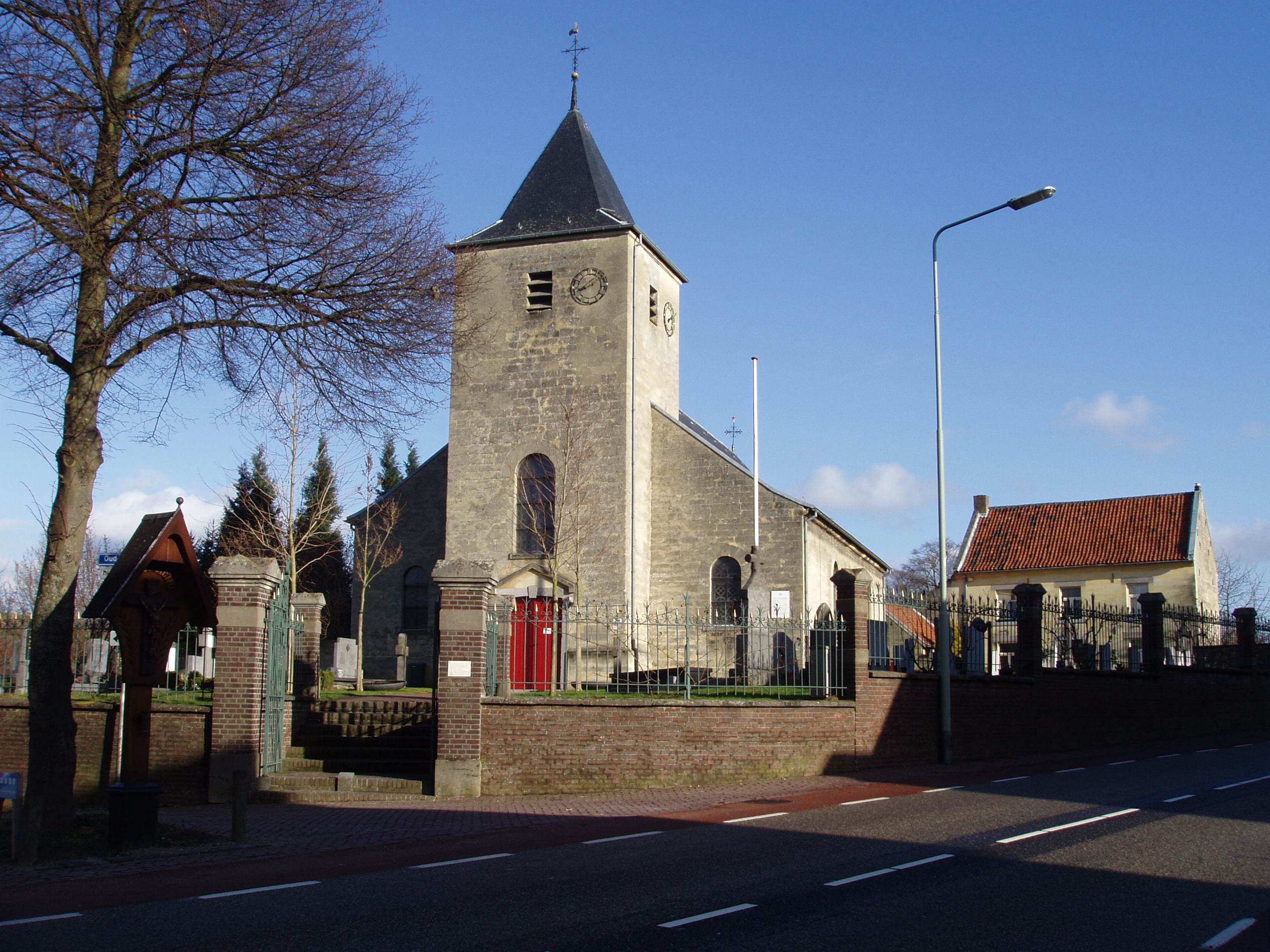
- Church of Saint John the Baptist

- Coat of arms

- Location in the Netherlands Location in the province of Limburg in the Netherlands
- Coordinates: 50°51′17″N 5°51′16″E
- Country: Netherlands
- Province: Limburg
- Municipality: Valkenburg aan de Geul

Area
  - Total: 1.03 km^{2} (0.40 sq mi)
- Elevation: 75 m (246 ft)

Population (2021)
  - Total: 115
  - Density: 112/km^{2} (289/sq mi)
- Time zone: UTC+1 (CET)
  - Summer (DST): UTC+2 (CEST)
- Postal code: 6301 & 6305
- Dialing code: 043

Oud-Valkenburg (English: Old-Falkenburg) is a village in the Dutch province of Limburg. It is located in the municipality of Valkenburg aan de Geul, and has about 115 inhabitants.

Although small, Oud-Valkenburg counts several monuments, among which are two medieval castles: Genhoes and Schaloen. Noteworthy is also the Roman Catholic church of Saint John the Baptist (medieval nave; choir and baroque altar inside by Johann Joseph Couven).

== History ==
The village was first mentioned in 1041 as Falchenberch, and is named after the castle. Around 1100, a new castle was built further to the west. The settlement which developed around the new castle is called Valkenburg, and the old settlement Oud-Valkenburg.

Genhoes Castle is a castle surrounded by a moat which was called Alden-Valkenburg in 1241. It was damaged by war in 1575, and restored in 1620. The U-shaped front building dates from the 18th century but burnt down in 1860.

The Catholic John the Baptist Church is a three aisled church with 11th century elements. The tower was added in the 14th century. It was enlarged several times and restored in 1984.

Oud-Valkenburg was a separate municipality until 1940, when it was merged with Valkenburg. The municipality included the villages Sibbe and IJzeren. In 1982, it became part of the municipality of Valkenburg aan de Geul.
