= Valkenburg aan de Geul =

Valkenburg aan de Geul Valkeberg aan de Geul
- Municipality
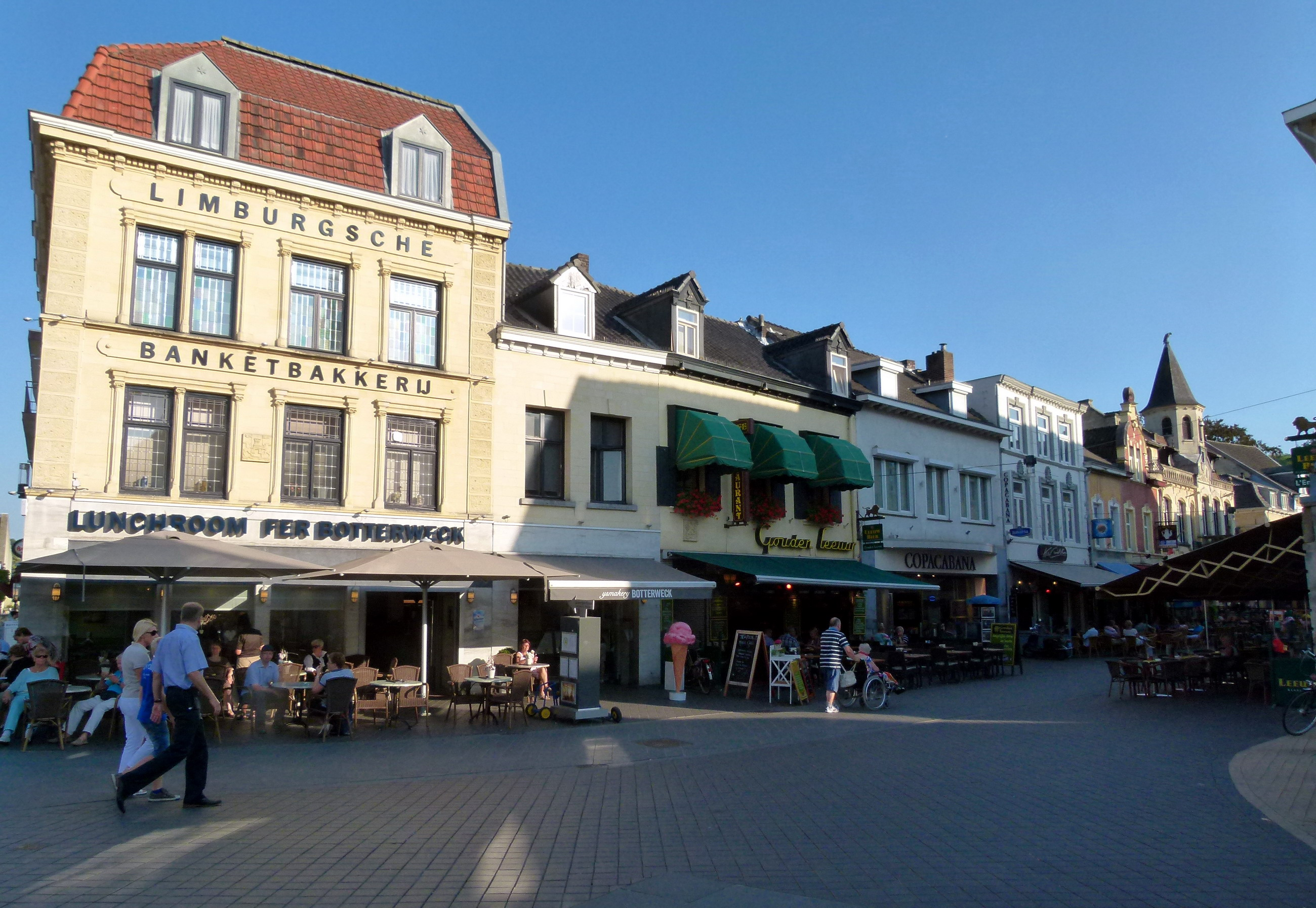
- Valkenburg city centre

- Flag Coat of arms

- Location in Limburg
- Coordinates: 50°51′54″N 05°49′52″E
- Country: Netherlands
- Province: Limburg

Government
  - Body: Municipal council
  - Mayor: Daan Prevoo

Area
  - Total: 36.92 km^{2} (14.25 sq mi)
  - Land: 36.73 km^{2} (14.18 sq mi)
  - Water: 0.19 km^{2} (0.073 sq mi)
- Elevation: 73 m (240 ft)

Population (January 2021)
  - Total: 16,365
  - Density: 446/km^{2} (1,160/sq mi)
- Demonym: Valkenburger
- Time zone: UTC+1 (CET)
  - Summer (DST): UTC+2 (CEST)
- Postcode: 6300–6305, 6325, 6340–6342
- Area code: 043
- Website: www.valkenburg.nl

Valkenburg aan de Geul (Dutch: [ˈvɑlkə(m)bʏr(ə)x aːn də ˈɣøːl]; Limburgish: Valkeberg [ˈvɑl˦əkəˌbæʀ˦əx]) is a municipality situated in the southeastern Dutch province of Limburg. The name refers to the central town in the municipality, Valkenburg, and the small river Geul passing through it.

== History ==
Sieges and conquests have been the recurrent theme in the history of Valkenburg, especially in connection with Valkenburg castle, seat of the counts of Valkenburg (or Falkenburg). In December 1672 the castle was once again destroyed by Dutch troops led by William III, trying to prevent the armies of Louis XIV of France from capturing it, this time not to be rebuilt.

In the 19th century, because of the natural environment of the area, Valkenburg became a holiday destination for the well-to-do in the Netherlands. Tourism developed, especially after in 1853 the railway from Maastricht to Heerlen and Aachen opened. Valkenburg railway station is the oldest surviving station in the Netherlands. In the beginning of the 20th century, Dutch architect Pierre Cuypers lived in Valkenburg for several years. He helped develop tourism by designing a hotel, an open-air theater and a copy of the catacombs of Rome. He also restored the medieval church and designed several tombs and a chapel in Gothic Revival style in a graveyard situated on Cauberg, a steep hill outside the town center.

During the Second World War Valkenburg was occupied by Nazi-Germany for four years, four months and one week. The town was liberated on 17 September 1944 by the American 30th Infantry Division. They were greeted with tulips and bread. For an overview of the resistance movement in Valkenburg during the war, see Valkenburg resistance.

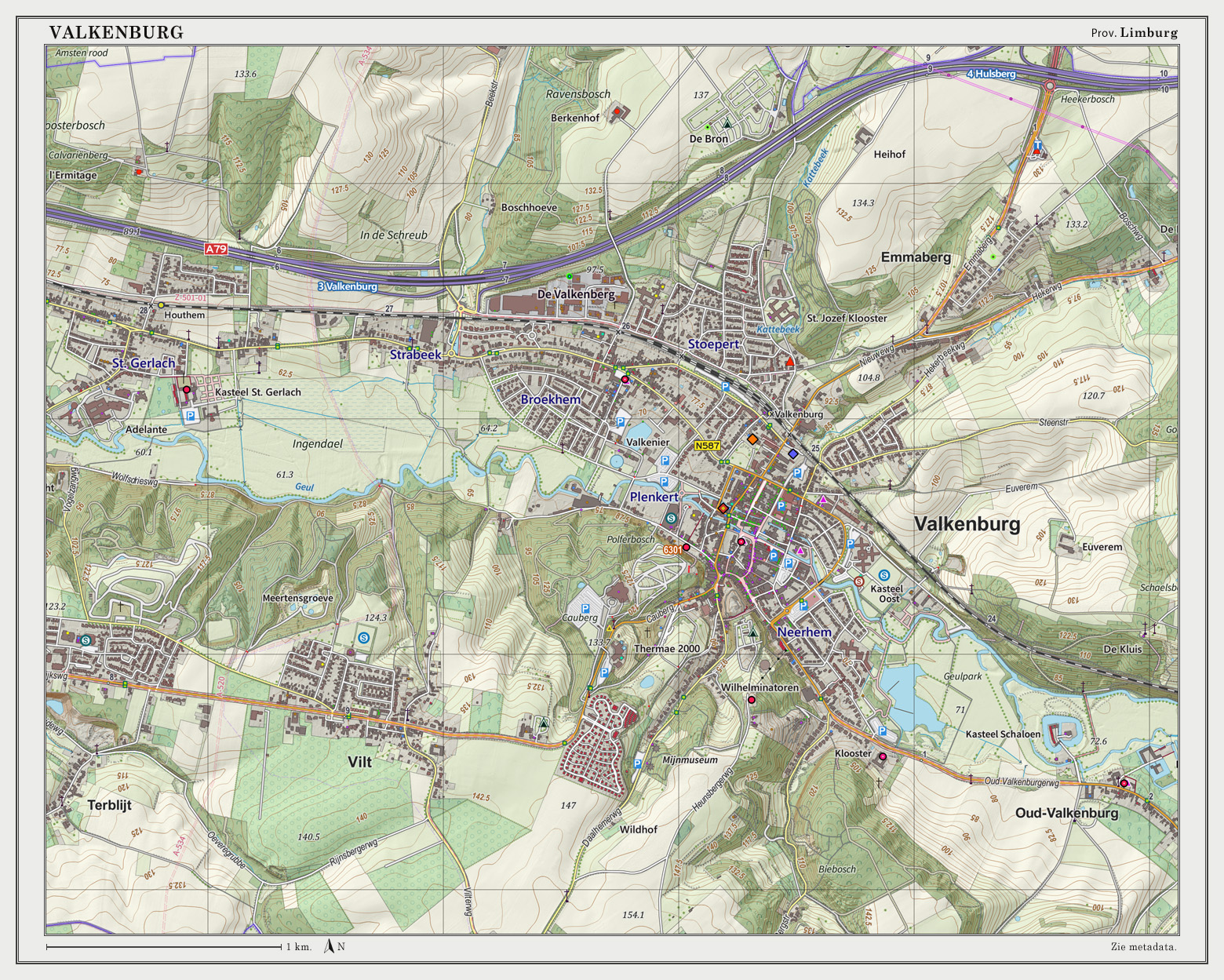
Topographic map of Valkenburg, as of March 2014

Valkenburg is no longer a fortified town but it has largely retained its historical charm, although the town suffered heavily from mass tourism in the 1960s, 70s and 80s. The municipality of Valkenburg aan de Geul still hosts more than 1 million overnight stays a year. The present aim of the council of Valkenburg is to move away from mass tourism and emphasize "the natural and historical beauty of the town". In order to attract more "quality tourism" a plan was made called Vestingstad Valkenburg (Fortification Town Valkenburg). Included in the plan were the restoration of two surviving city gates, the rebuilding of Geulpoort, a 14th-century city gate that was demolished along with the castle in the 17th century, and the reconstruction of the defensive moat along the Medieval wall in Halderpark. More or less simultaneously initiated was the redevelopment of the town's shopping district, finished around 2017.

The river Geul flooded its banks on 15 July 2021, causing considerable damage to bridges and buildings in the entire town centre.

== Main sights ==
These days Valkenburg is known for its tourist attractions, chalk houses (locally called mergel or marl) and the hilly countryside. The main sight are:

- Valkenburg castle, of which only a ruin remains;
- several other castles, castle farms and stately homes, mostly situated along the Geul river;
- Oud-Valkenburg, a small village along the Geul with a particularly picturesque ensemble of a gothic church, two castles (Genhoes and Schaloen) and several historic farmsteads, all in local marlstone;
- several watermills, two in the old town;
- parts of the city walls and two of three city gates survived (Berkelpoort and Grendelpoort; the third gate, Geulpoort was rebuilt in 2014);
- old court building (Spaans Leenhof);
- Saint Nicolas church, a Gothic church in Valkenburg with some late Medieval wood carvings;
- Saint Gerlachus church in nearby Houthem Sint-Gerlach, with Baroque frescos by Johann Adam Schöpf, painted on marl;
- several former marl quarries (locally called 'caves', although they are largely man-made), offering guided tours; some have interesting charcoal drawings and marl sculptures, one has been recreated as the catacombs of Rome (designed by Pierre Cuypers), another one as a coal mine; in the winter Christmas markets are held in some quarries;
- a 30-metre-high (98-foot) viewing tower (Wilhelminatoren) atop a hill (collapsed 16 March 2025), connected to the town below by aerial lift;
- Thermae 2000, a sauna and wellness resort;
- a Holland Casino branch, as well as a large park around it (Kuurpark);
- two amusement parks; one focusing on popular fairy tales (Sprookjesbos);

Valkenburg is situated in a part of the Netherlands that is known for its natural environment and historical buildings. The area, although quite hilly, is perfectly suited for walks or (mountain) bike tours.

=== Listed buildings in Valkenburg ===
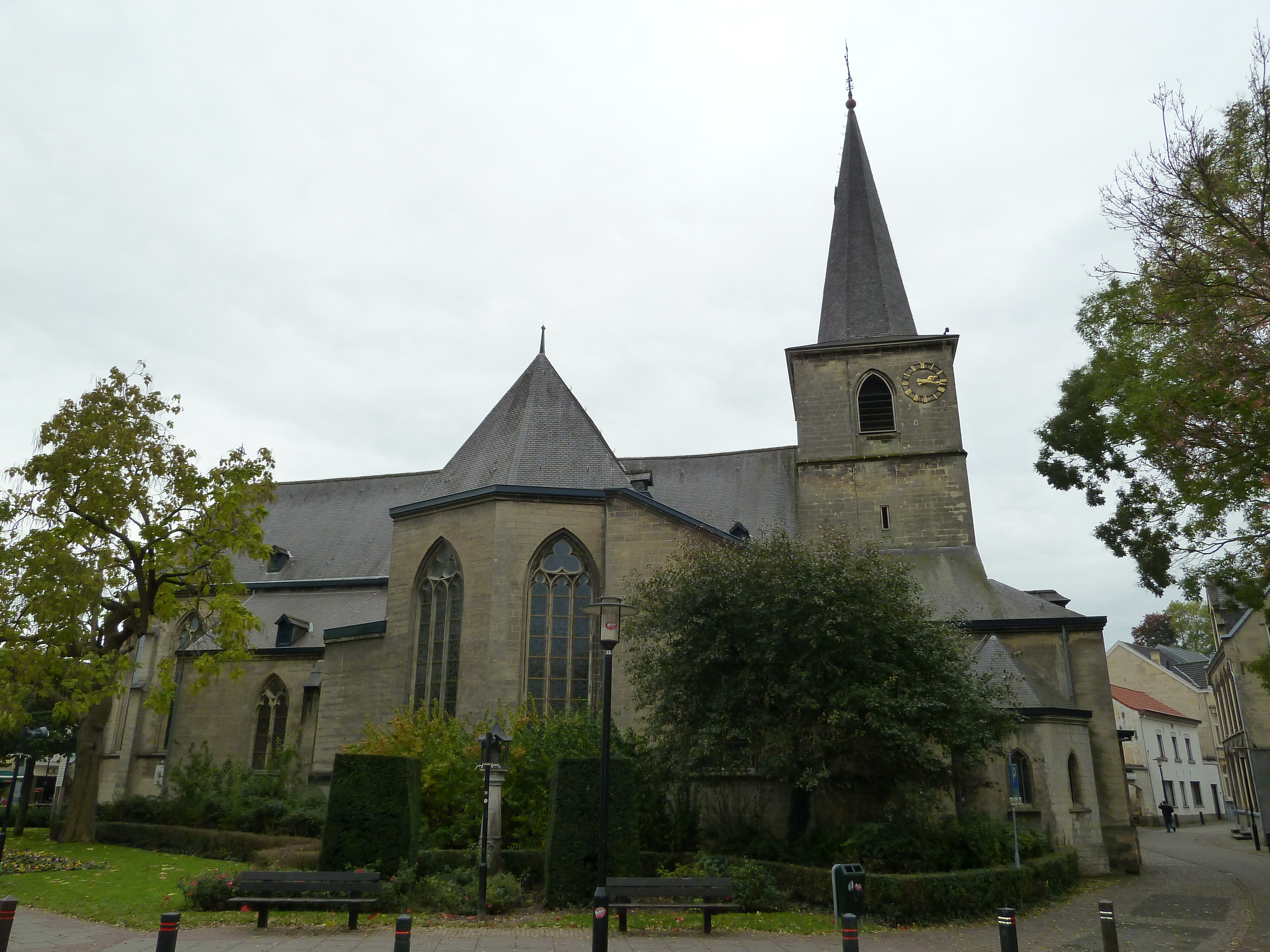
St Nicholas church

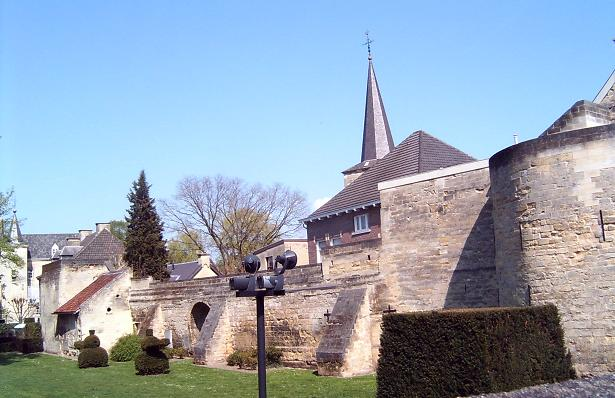
City walls

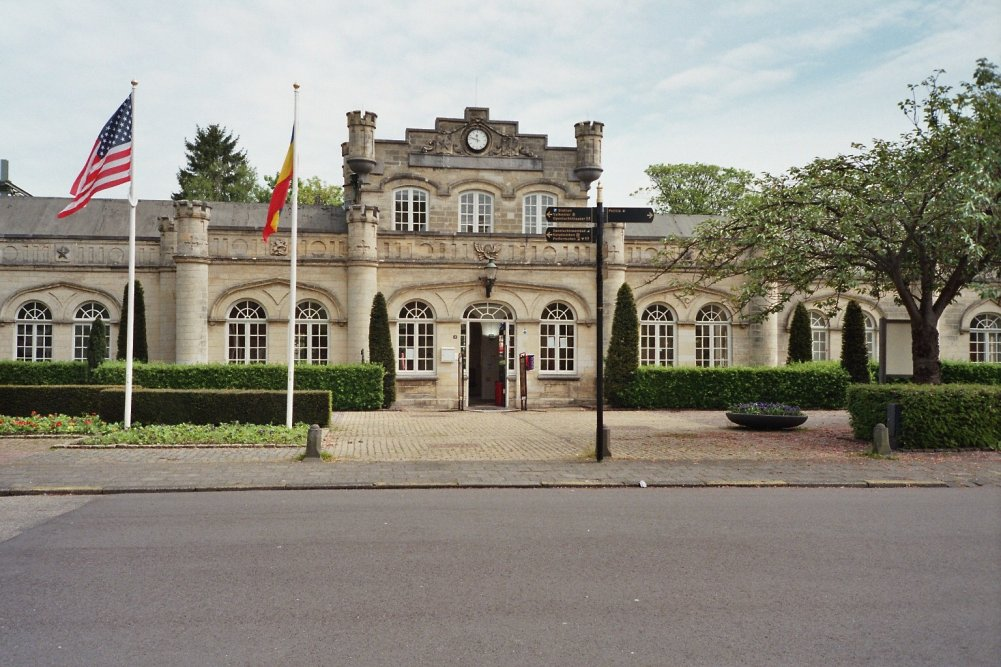
Railway station

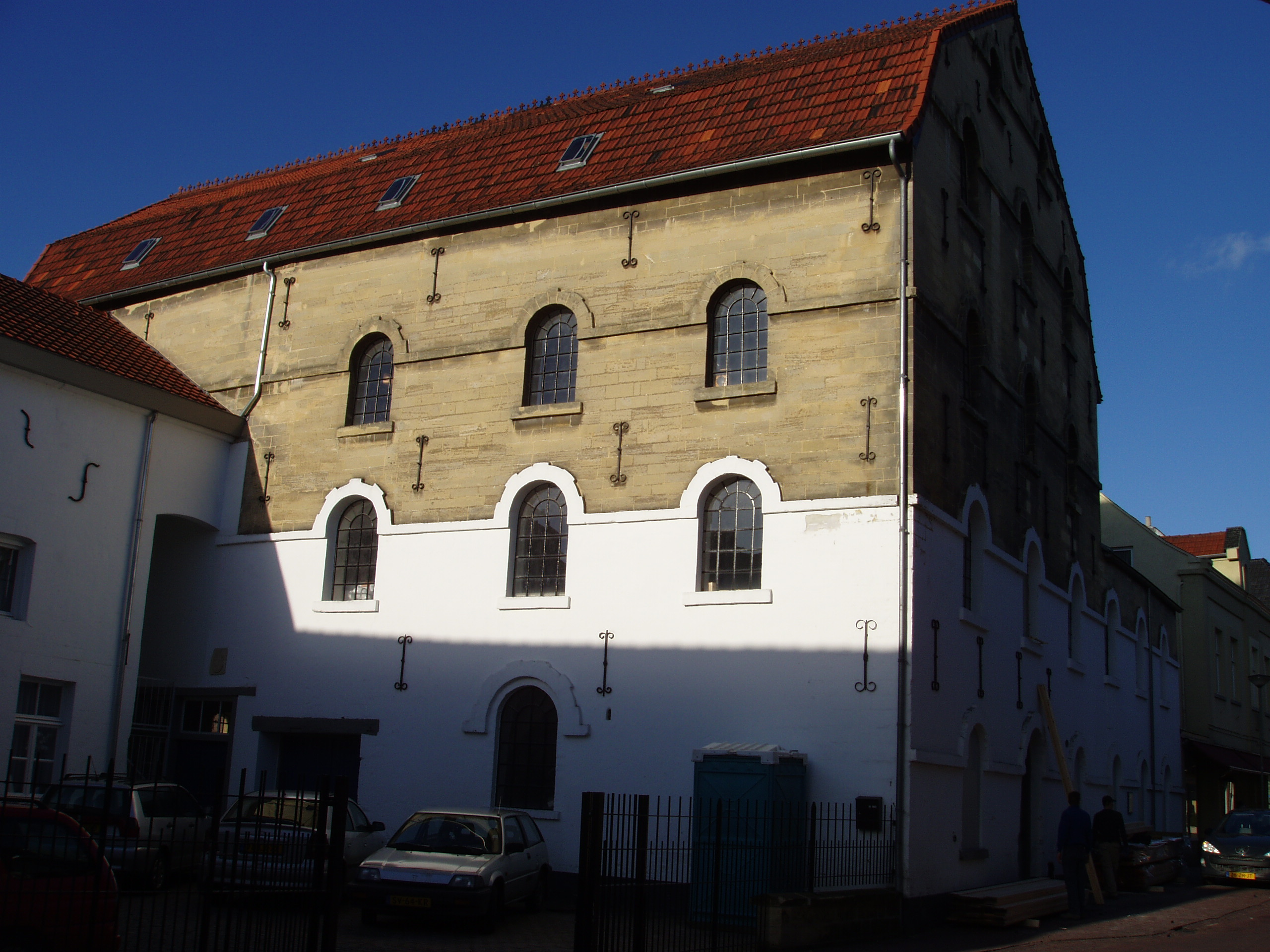
Watermill

=== Castles and stately homes in Valkenburg ===
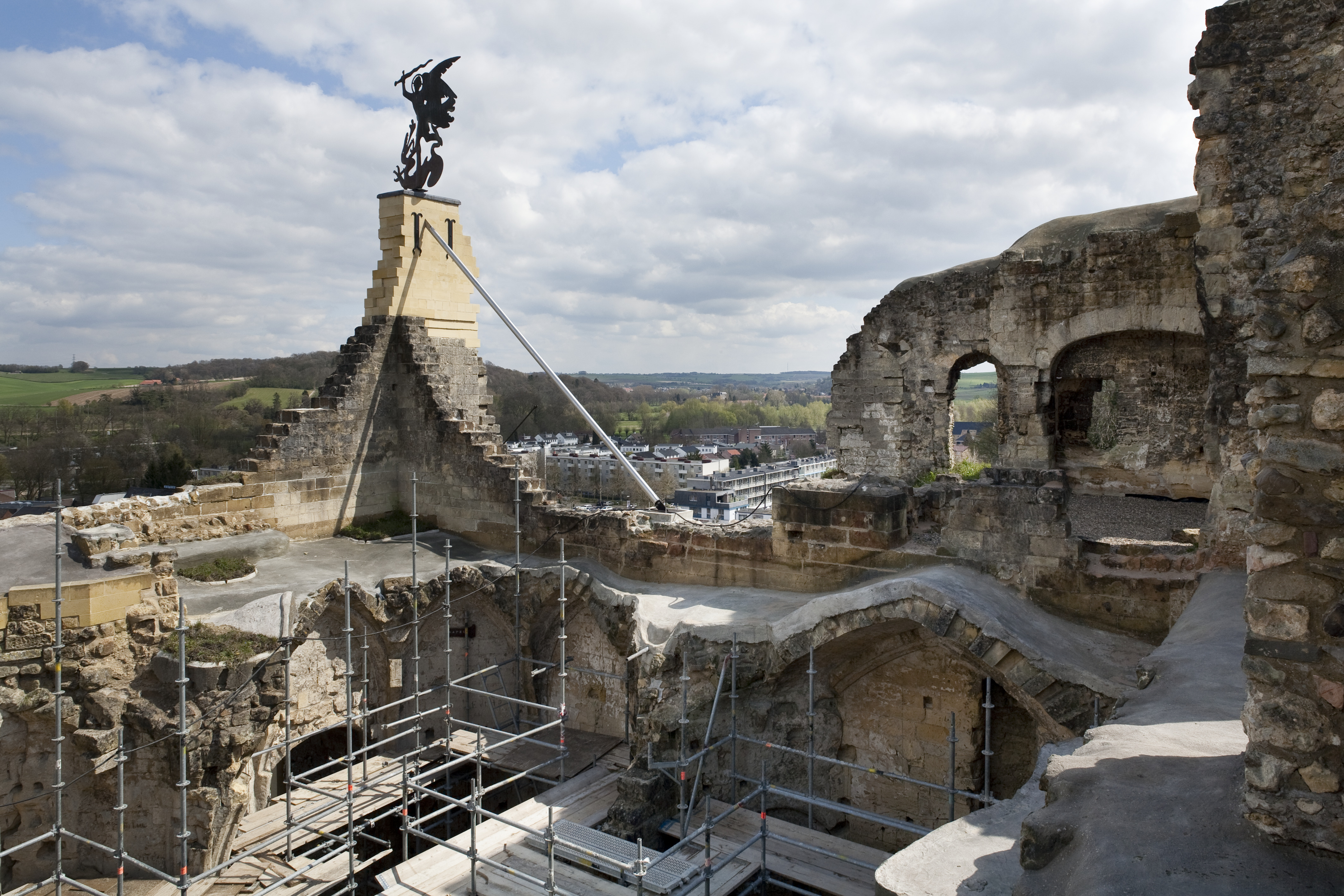
Ruined castle

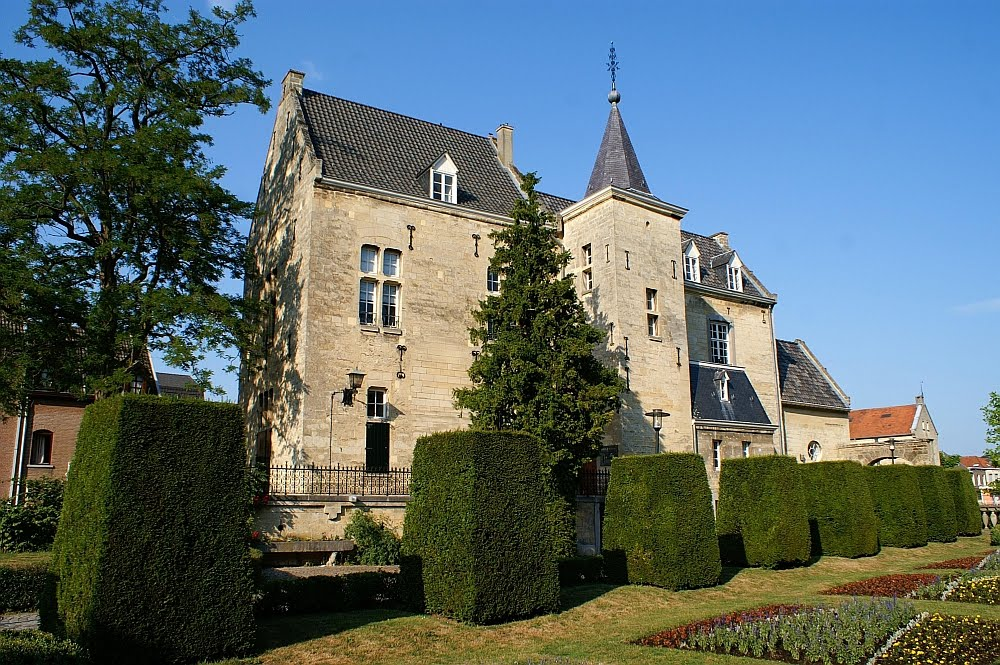
Den Halder castle

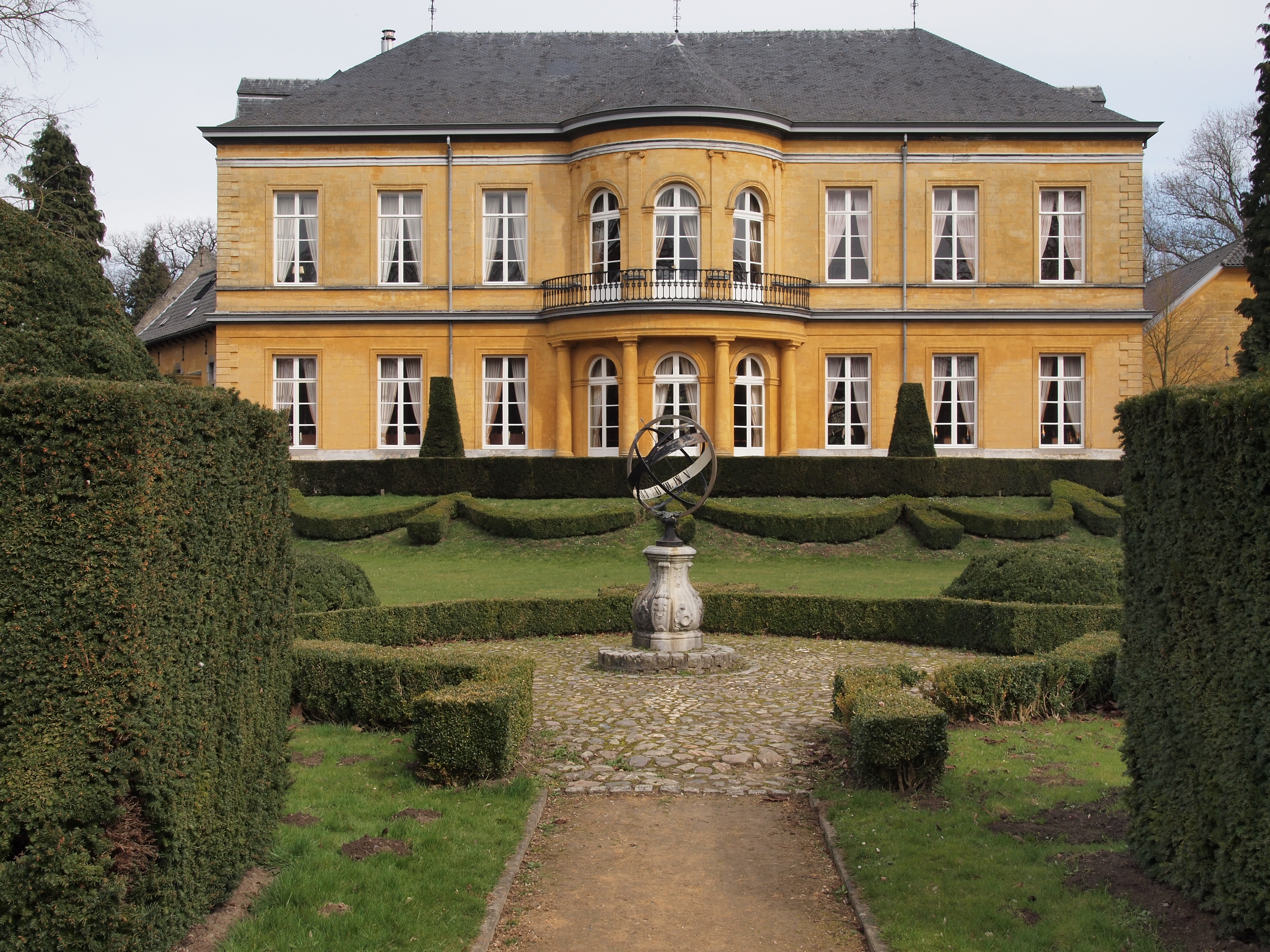
Oost castle

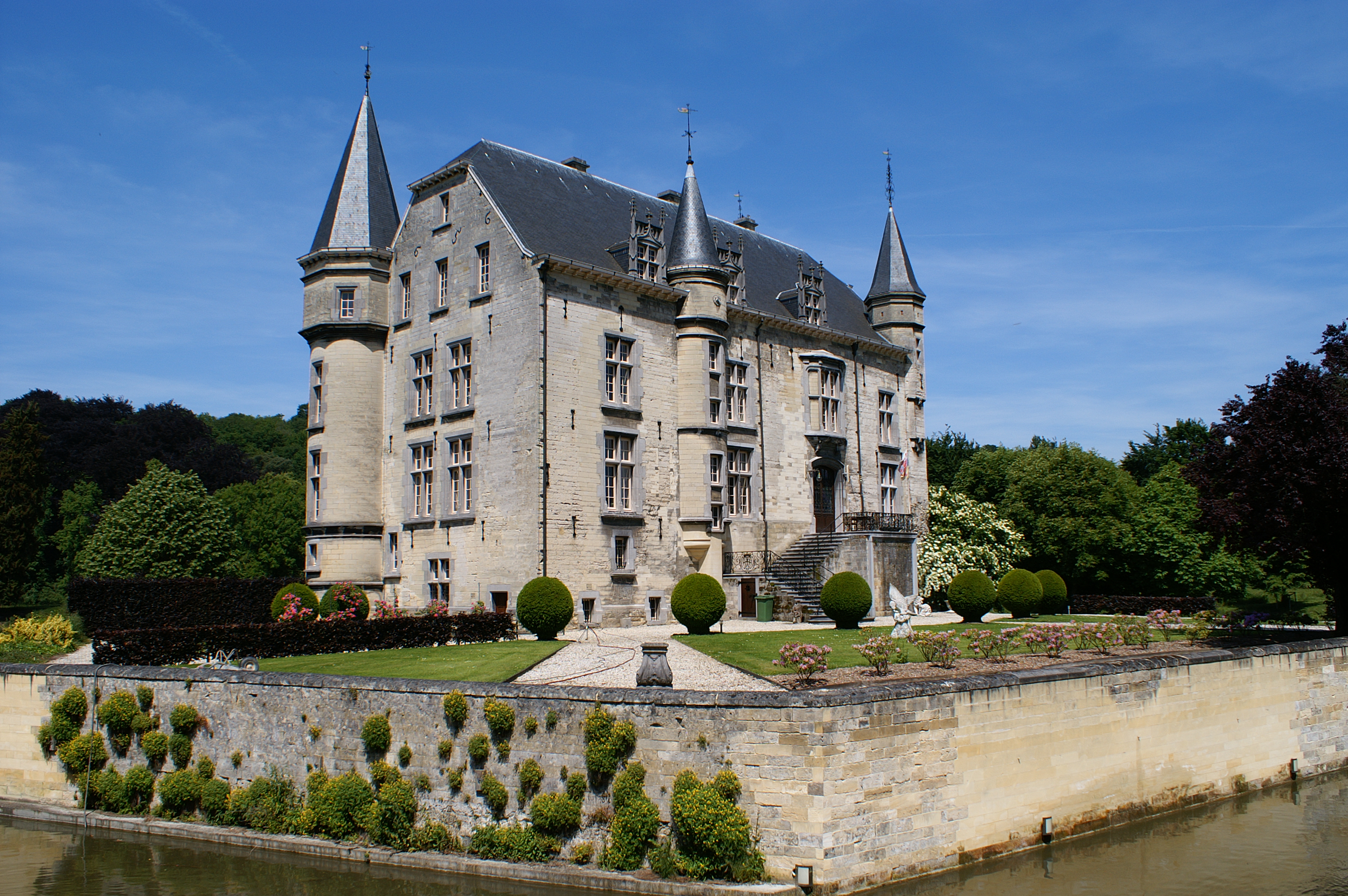
Schaloen castle

=== Tourist attractions in Valkenburg ===
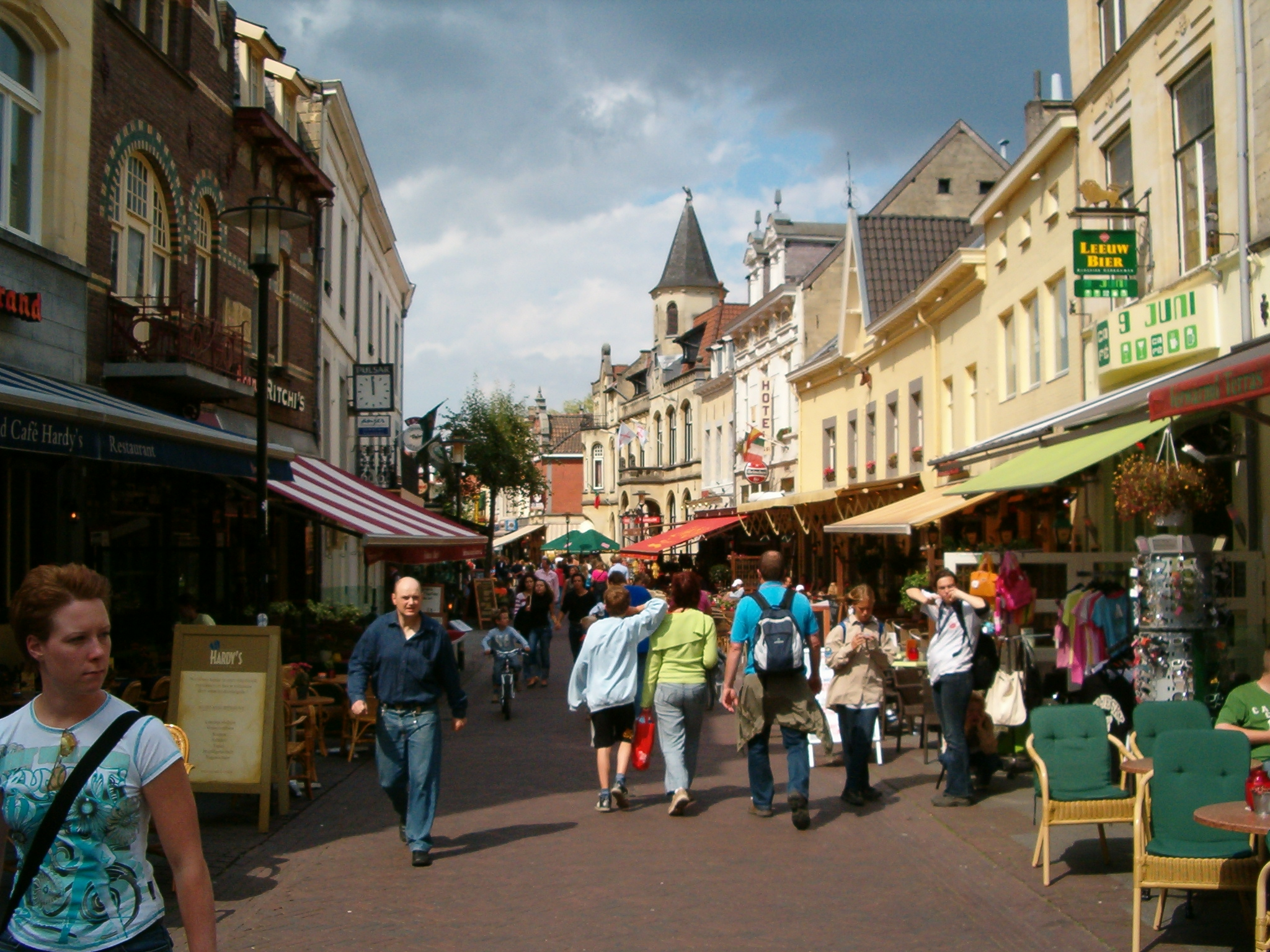
Grotestraat, Valkenburg mainstreet

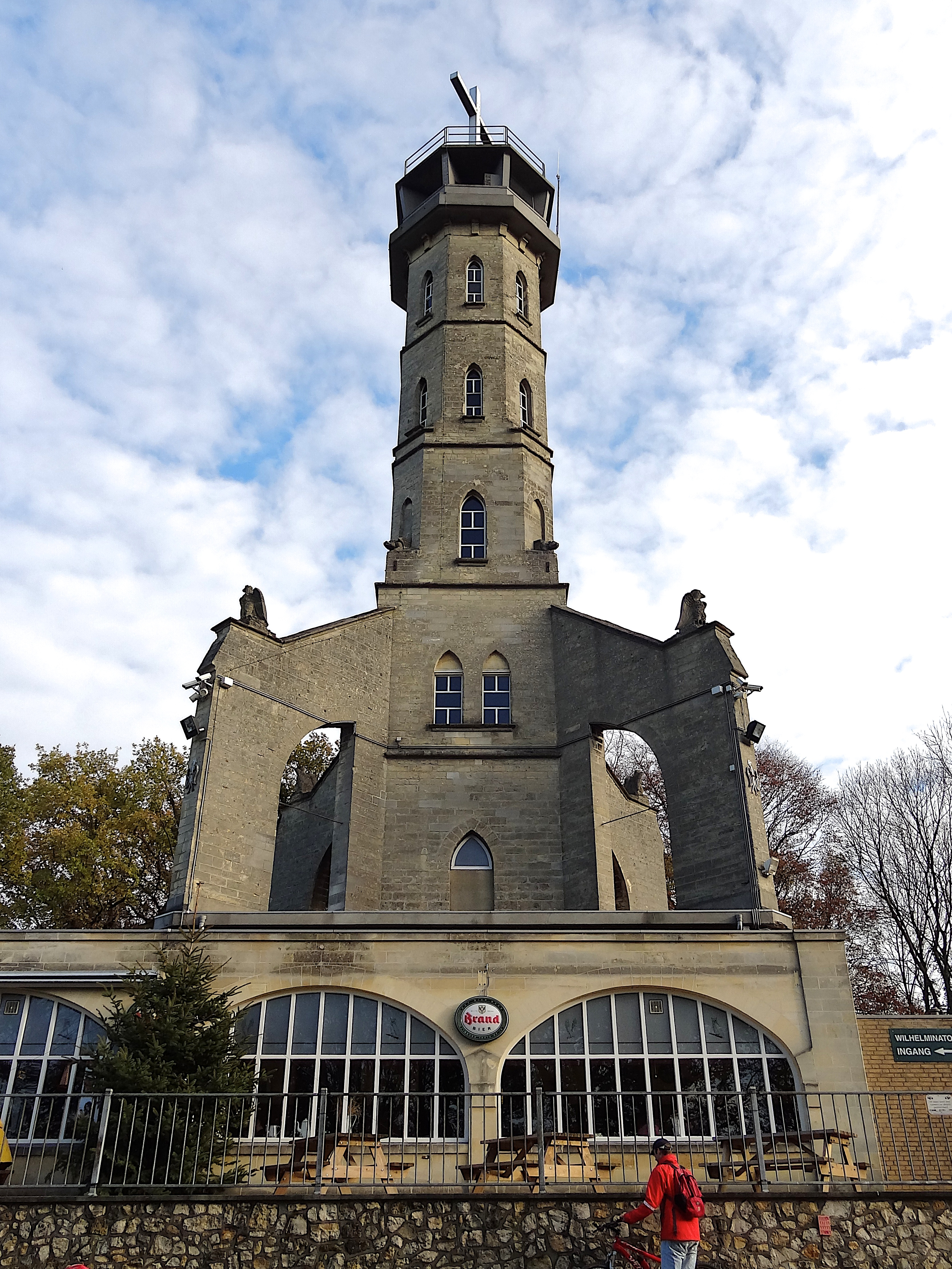
Wilhelmina tower

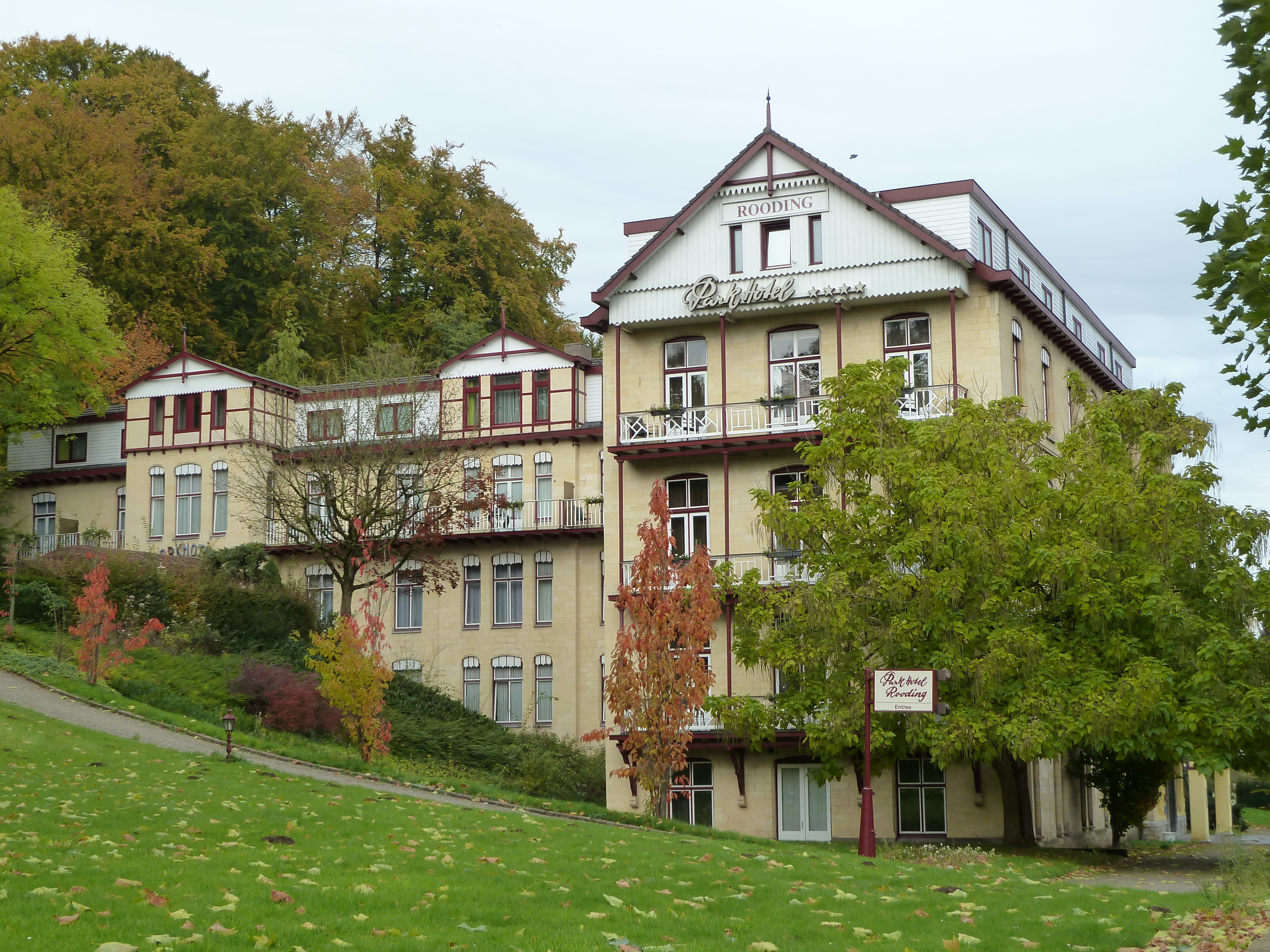
Hotel built by Cuypers

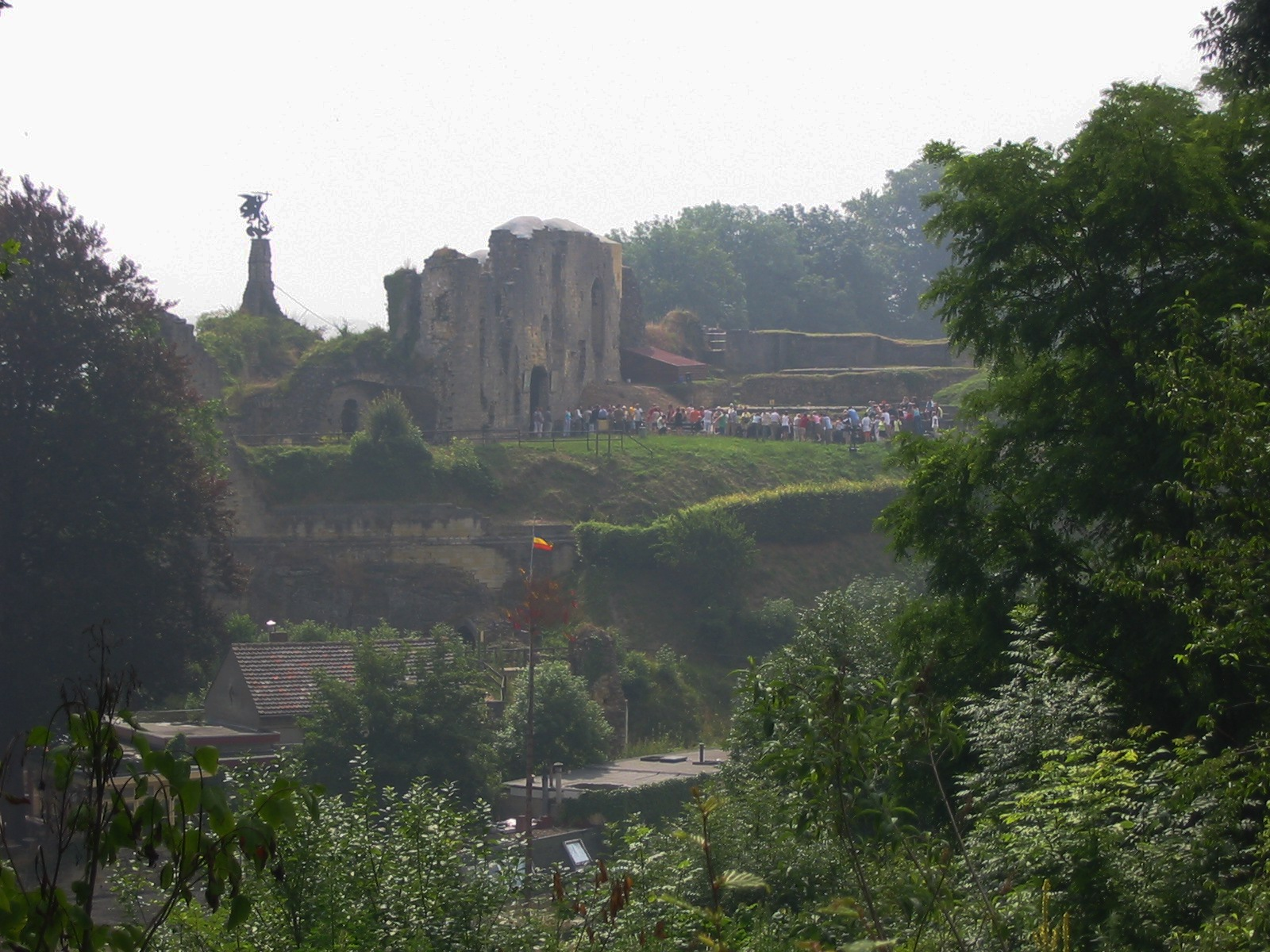
Tourists queueing at Valkenburg castle

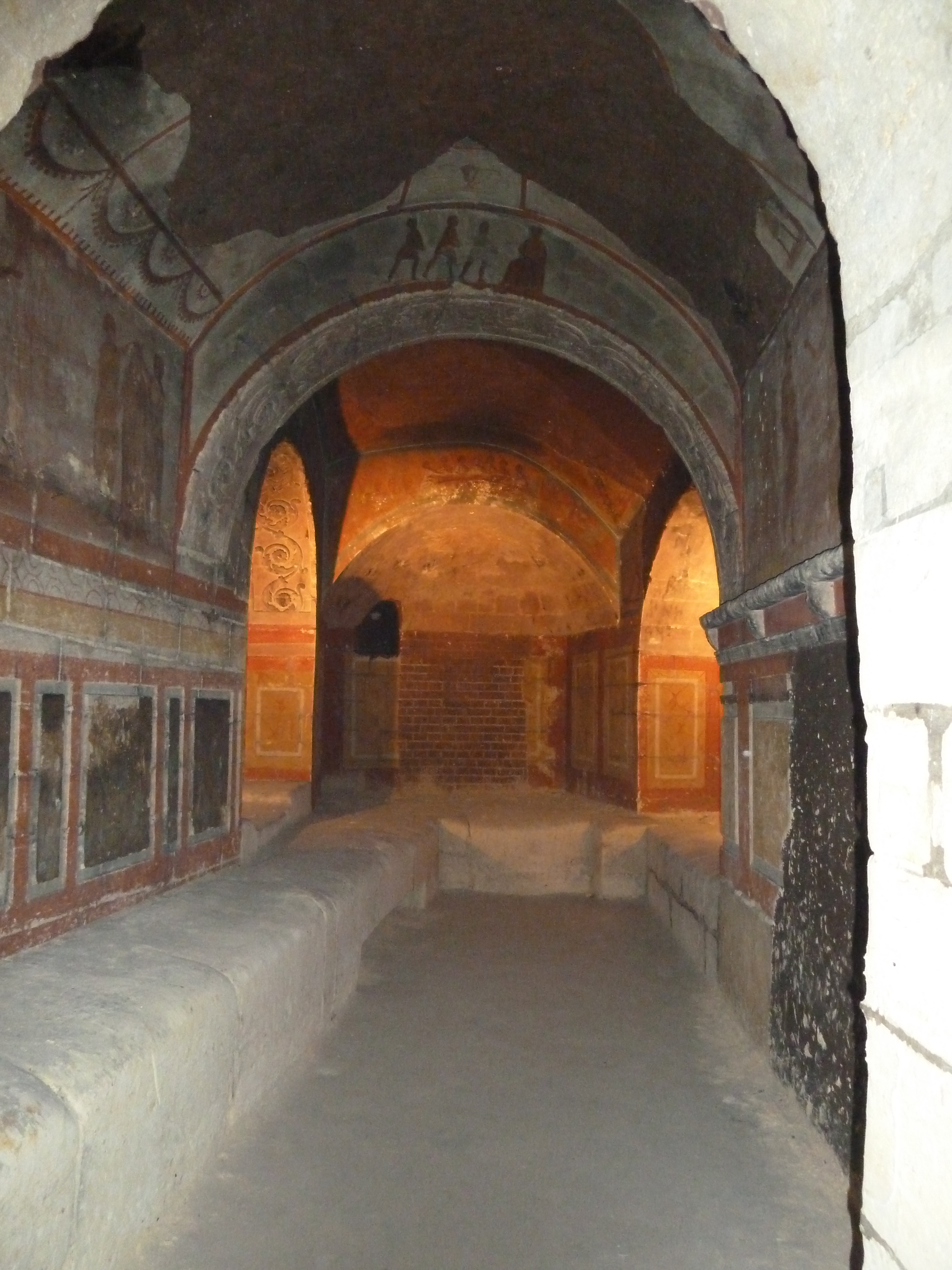
Roman catacombs (Cuypers)

=== Cycling ===
Valkenburg aan de Geul is famous for its cycling events. The city has hosted the UCI Road Cycling World Championship a record five times, in 1938, 1948, 1979 and 1998 and again in 2012. Since 2003, the city's Cauberg hill has been the finish of the Amstel Gold Race, and since 2017 is in the last 10km distance from the finish. The Tour de France had a stage finish in Valkenburg in 1992 and in 2006.

The Cauberg Cyclo-cross is a cyclo-cross race and a part of the UCI Cyclo-cross World Cup.

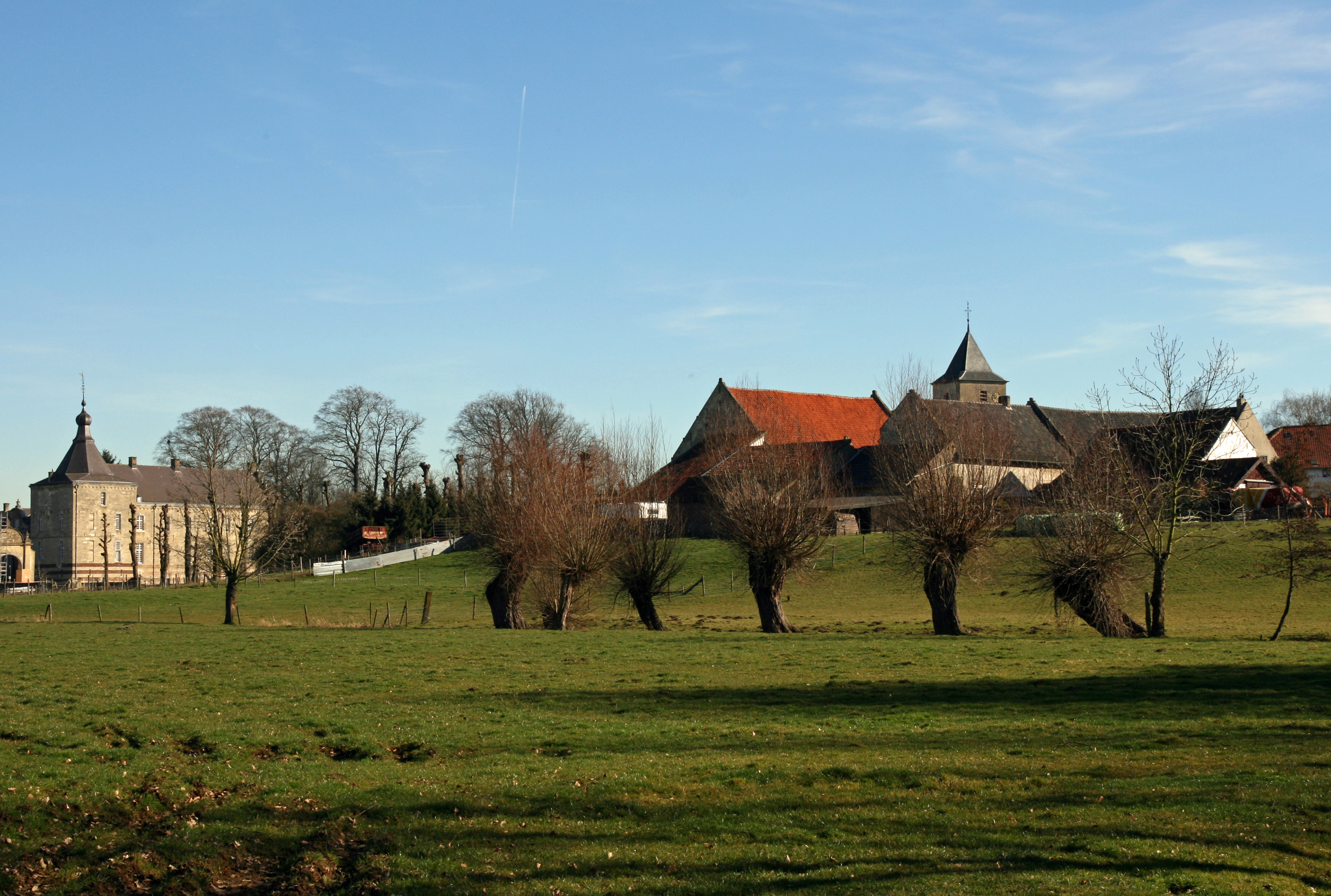
The village of Oud-Valkenburg

== Population centres ==
Apart from the city of Valkenburg (including the neighbourhood of Broekhem), the municipality of Valkenburg aan de Geul comprises the following villages and hamlets: Berg en Terblijt, Vilt, Geulhem, Houthem, Sibbe, IJzeren, Oud-Valkenburg, Schin op Geul en Walem.

== Transport ==
=== By car ===
Valkenburg aan de Geul is served by the A79 motorway, this motorway runs from Maastricht to Heerlen.

=== By train ===
Valkenburg aan de Geul has three train stations Valkenburg, Houthem-Sint Gerlach and Schin op Geul, operated by Arriva.

=== By bus ===
Valkenburg aan de Geul is served by Arriva buses

== Notable residents ==
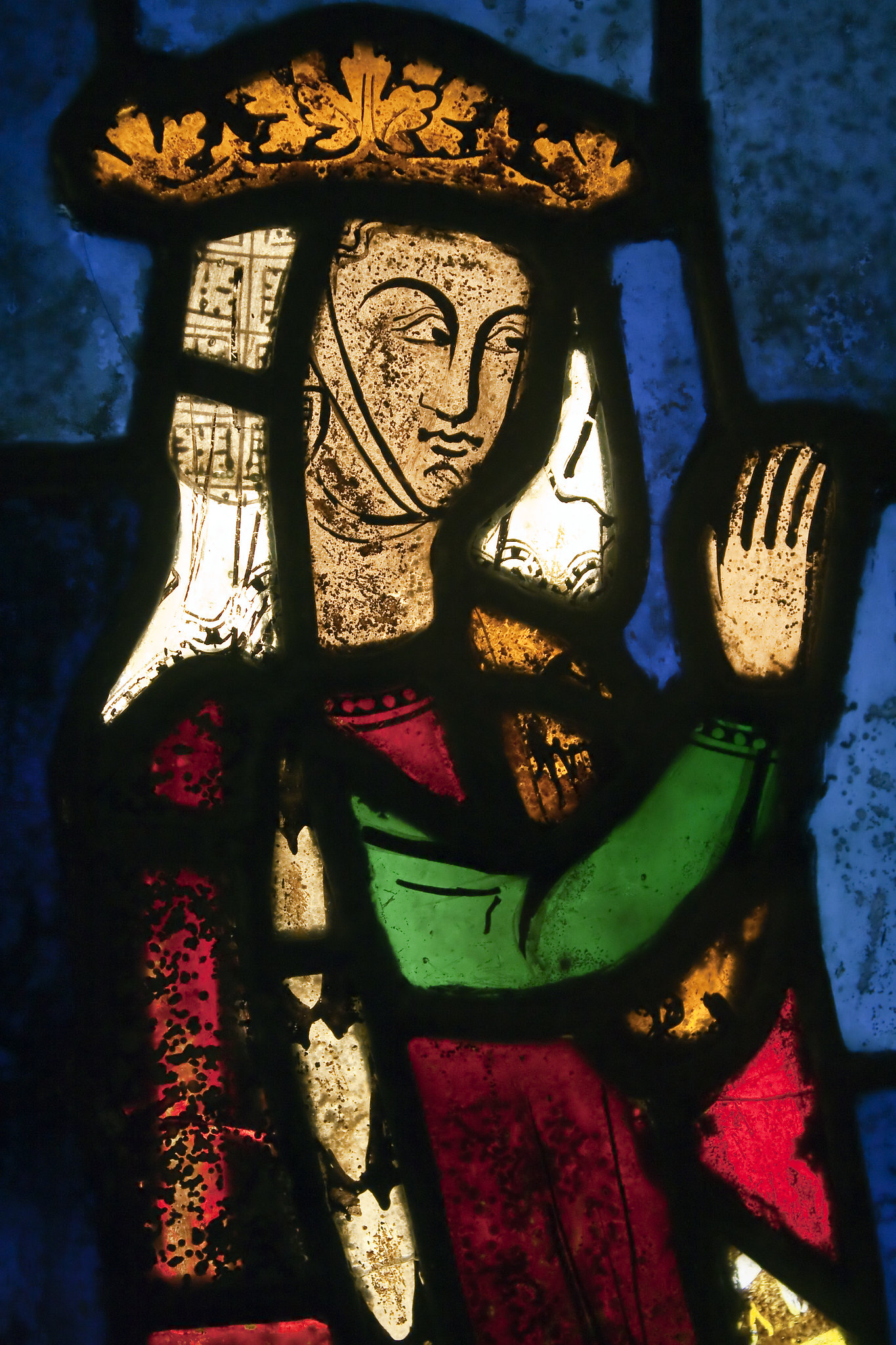
Beatrice of Valkenburg, 13th C.

- Saint Gerlach (died c. 1170), hermit
- Beatrice of Valkenburg (c. 1254 - 1277), queen of Germany
- Pierre Cuypers (1827 – 1921), architect; spent a few years in Valkenburg
- Erich Wasmann (1859 - 1931), Austrian-born entomologist
- Jan Hanlo (1912 - 1969), poet and writer, grew up in Valkenburg
- Raymond Barion (born 1946) a Dutch artist, made in the form of paintings, sculptures and on paper
- Gerlach Cerfontaine (born 1946), business leader, CEO of Schiphol Group
- Marjon Lambriks (born 1949), soprano
- Rob Delahaye (born 1959) a Dutch former professional footballer with 359 club caps
- Camiel Eurlings (born 1973), politician, business leader, corporate director for KLM
- Rob Ruijgh (born 1986), racing cyclist

== Panorama ==
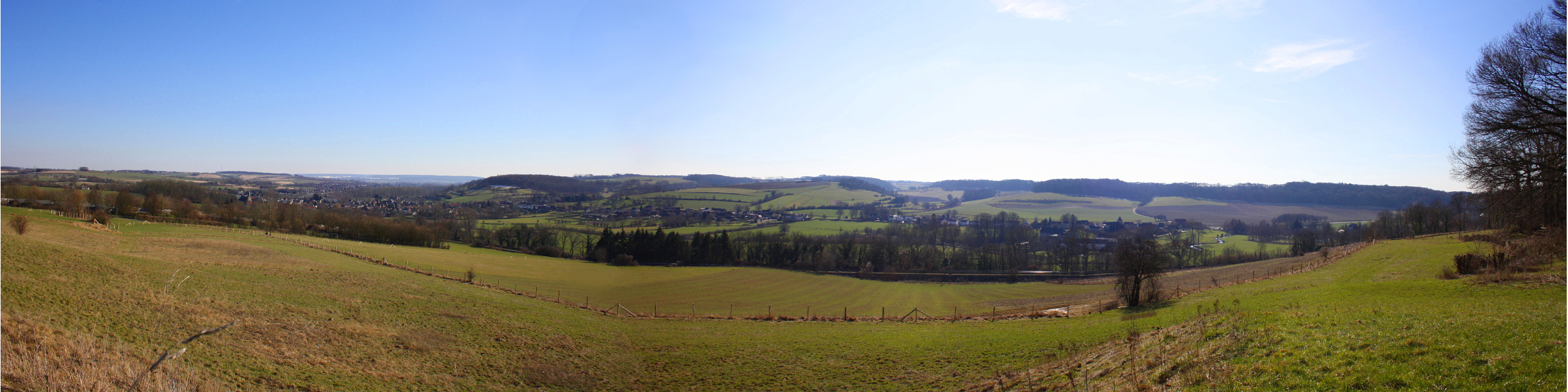
Panorama of hilly landscape in Valkenburg aan de Geul, between Oud-Valkenburg and Schin op Geul
