= Sibbe =

- Village
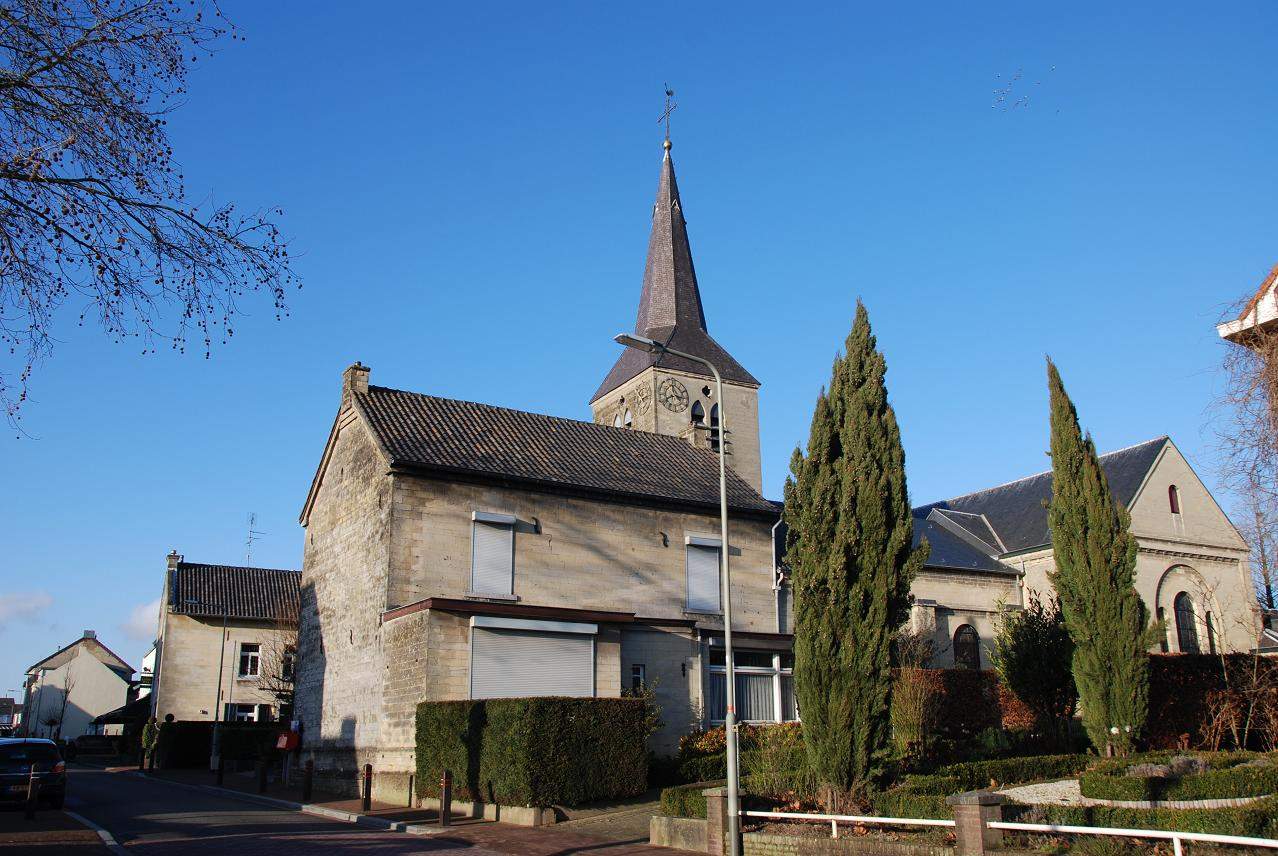
- Church of Saint Rose of Lima at Kerkstraat

- Location in the Netherlands Location in the province of Limburg in the Netherlands
- Coordinates: 50°50′36″N 5°49′32″E
- Country: Netherlands
- Province: Limburg
- Municipality: Valkenburg aan de Geul

Area
  - Total: 2.72 km^{2} (1.05 sq mi)
- Highest elevation: 160 m (520 ft)
- Lowest elevation: 120 m (390 ft)

Population (2021)
  - Total: 1,015
  - Density: 373/km^{2} (966/sq mi)
- Time zone: UTC+1 (CET)
  - Summer (DST): UTC+2 (CEST)
- Postal code: 6301
- Dialing code: 043

Sibbe (Limburgish: Sub or Süp) is the official Dutch name of a village in the municipality of Valkenburg aan de Geul in the province of Limburg in the southern part of the Netherlands.

== History ==
It has been proposed that the name of the village derives from the German word sippe, meaning a clan of a limited number of families. Another possibility is that the name derives from the Latin cippus, meaning young forest. However, both explanations do not fit with the local pronunciation Süp.

It is not known when the first inhabitants settled here. It is assumed that the Plateau of Margraten, at the edge of which Sibbe is situated, was gradually deforested and settled after the year 1000. The village was first mentioned ('Cybde') in a document in 1307. Until 1940 Sibbe was part of the municipality of Oud-Valkenburg.

== Population: economy, leisure, religion ==
In spite of some small-scale building projects, population has decreased over the last decades. This is the case for most parts of South Limburg, caused by population ageing, low birthrates and negative migration.

Sibbe is situated at the edge of the Plateau of Margraten, a fertile loess plain at 160 meters above NAP. Until recently, agriculture was the main means of life on the Plateau. Nowadays, most villagers commute to work in nearby towns like Valkenburg, Maastricht and Heerlen. Being close to tourist hotspot Valkenburg, the village offers some bed and breakfast accommodation, as well as a camping site. The last operating marl quarry in the Netherlands is situated in Sibbe. Tours on mountain bikes and quads are offered in the underground labyrinth in parts of the quarry that are no longer used for mining.

Sibbe has a very active community life with various sports clubs (football, handball, table tennis, billiards), a concert band, a mixed choir, a young adults club (Jonkheid), and a carnival club.

Although church-going has steeply declined in recent years, most of the inhabitants of Sibbe are still, at least nominally, members of the Roman Catholic Church. The first church was built here in 1840. Before, villagers had to walk the two miles to the parish church of Oud-Valkenburg. Until 1948 the church of Sibbe remained dependent on the church in Oud-Valkenburg.

== Sights ==
- Sibberhüske or Villaertshof. Manor house with a moat and a defensive tower, first mentioned in 1381. Parts of the tower may be medieval but most of the existing house dates from the 17th century, built in the local Mosan Renaissance architectural style, with alternating layers of brick and marlstone. The outbuildings are partly 18th century, partly rebuilt after a damaging fire in the 1930s.
- Various imposing carré farms (German: Vierkantshof), mainly along Dorpsstraat. The 17th/18th century carré farm Hellinxhof stands at Klein Linde.
- Church of Saint Rose of Lima. Neo-Romanesque parish church, begun in 1840 and enlarged in 1866 and 1927. The nave is original from the 1840s and was designed by the Maastricht architect Matthias Soiron.
- The 140 kilometer long underground maze of the Sibberberg, the marlstone quarry, parts of which date from the 15th century.
- French chapel inside the Sibberberg. Probably built during the years of the French First Republic, when Catholic priests that did not swear allegiance to the Republic, were restricted in their religious freedom. Some of the charcoal wall drawings date from around 1865.
- Neo-Gothic churchyard chapel.
- Modern glass chapel dedicated to Saint Rose of Lima, containing the processional altar built of thousands of pieces of wood, ceramic and shells by a former mayor of the village.
- Chapel Daalhemerweg and other small road chapels and crosses, dotted around the village.

== Gallery ==
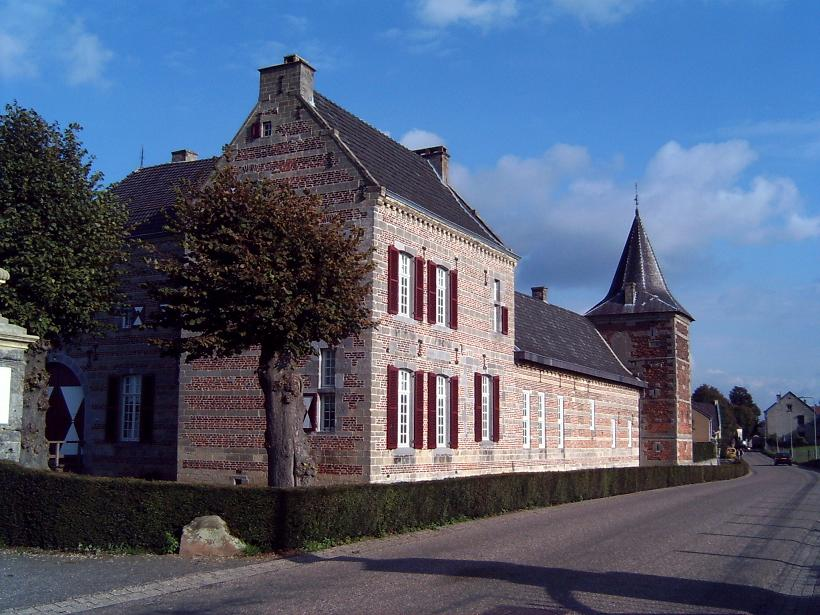
Villaertshof or Sibberhüske

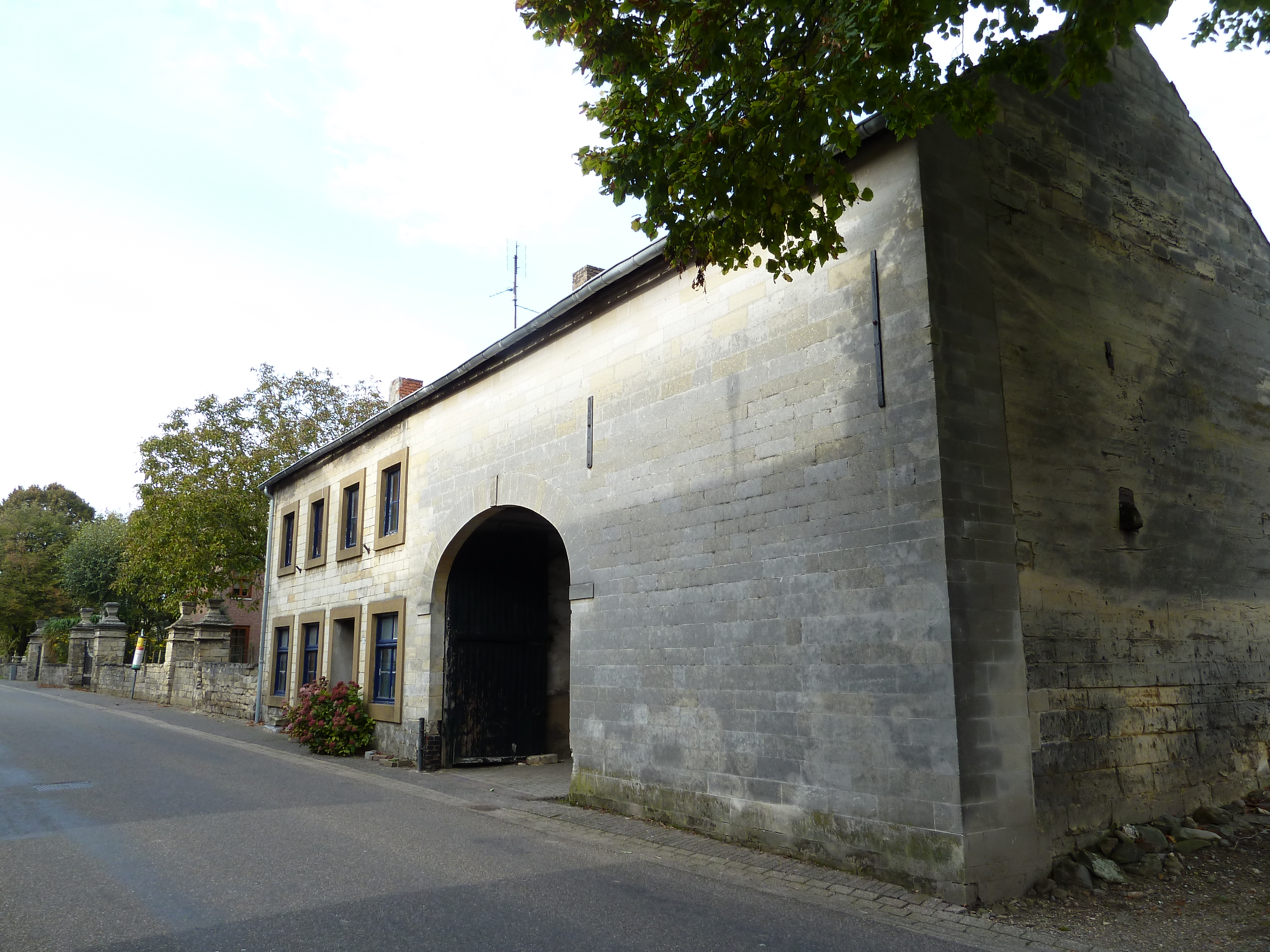
Carré farm and gates belonging to Villaertshof

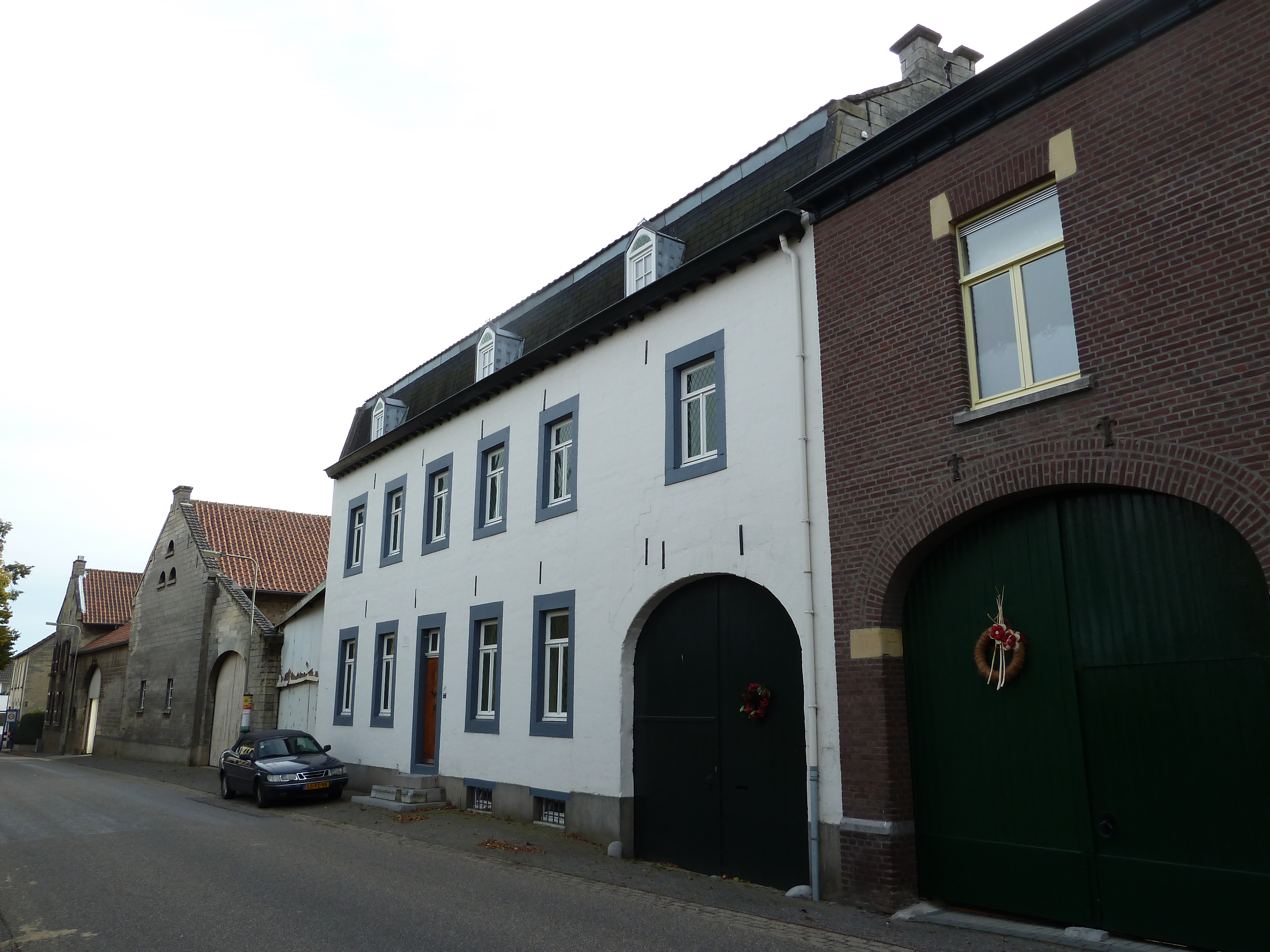
Carré farms Dorpsstraat

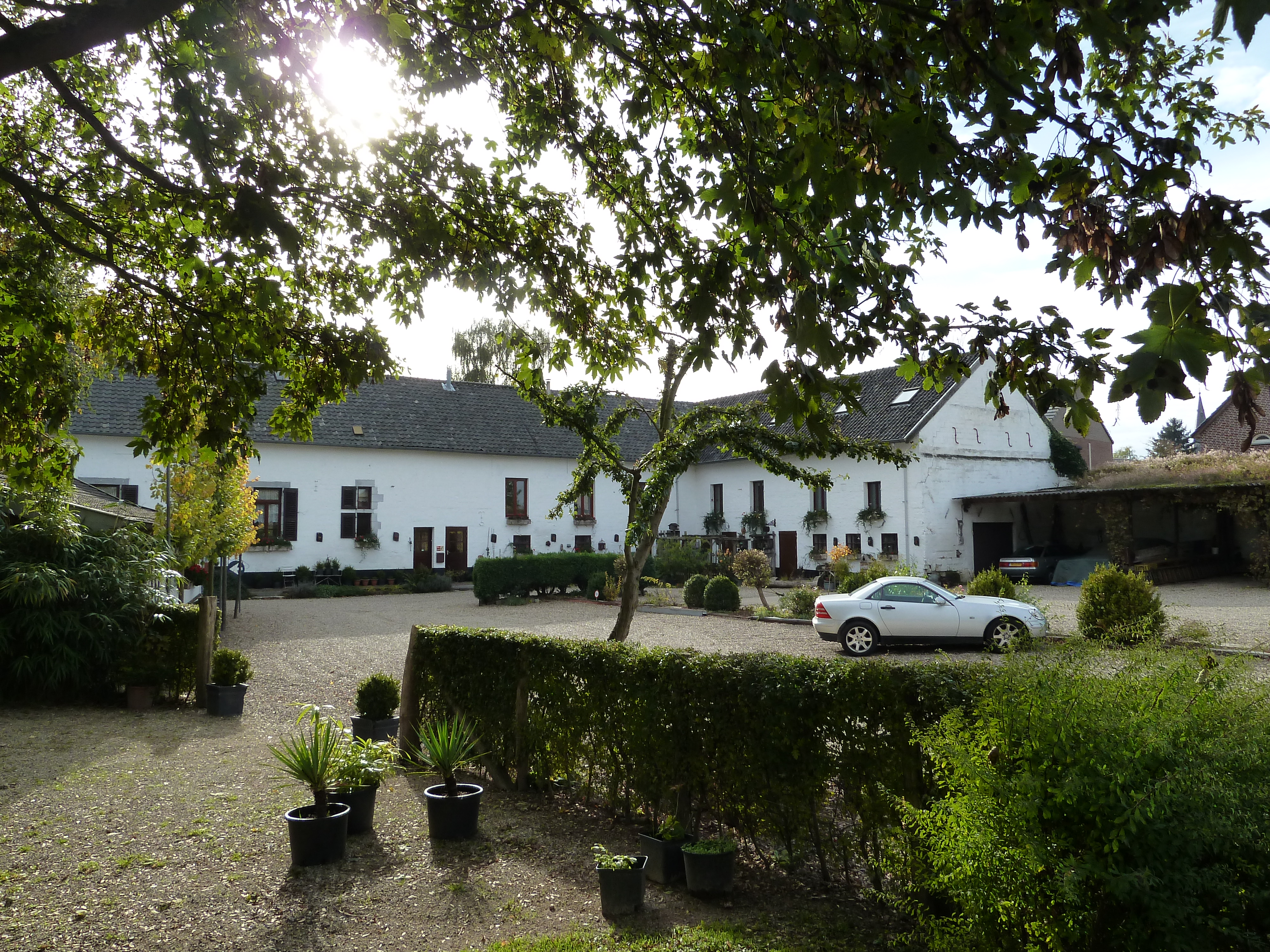
Hellinxhof

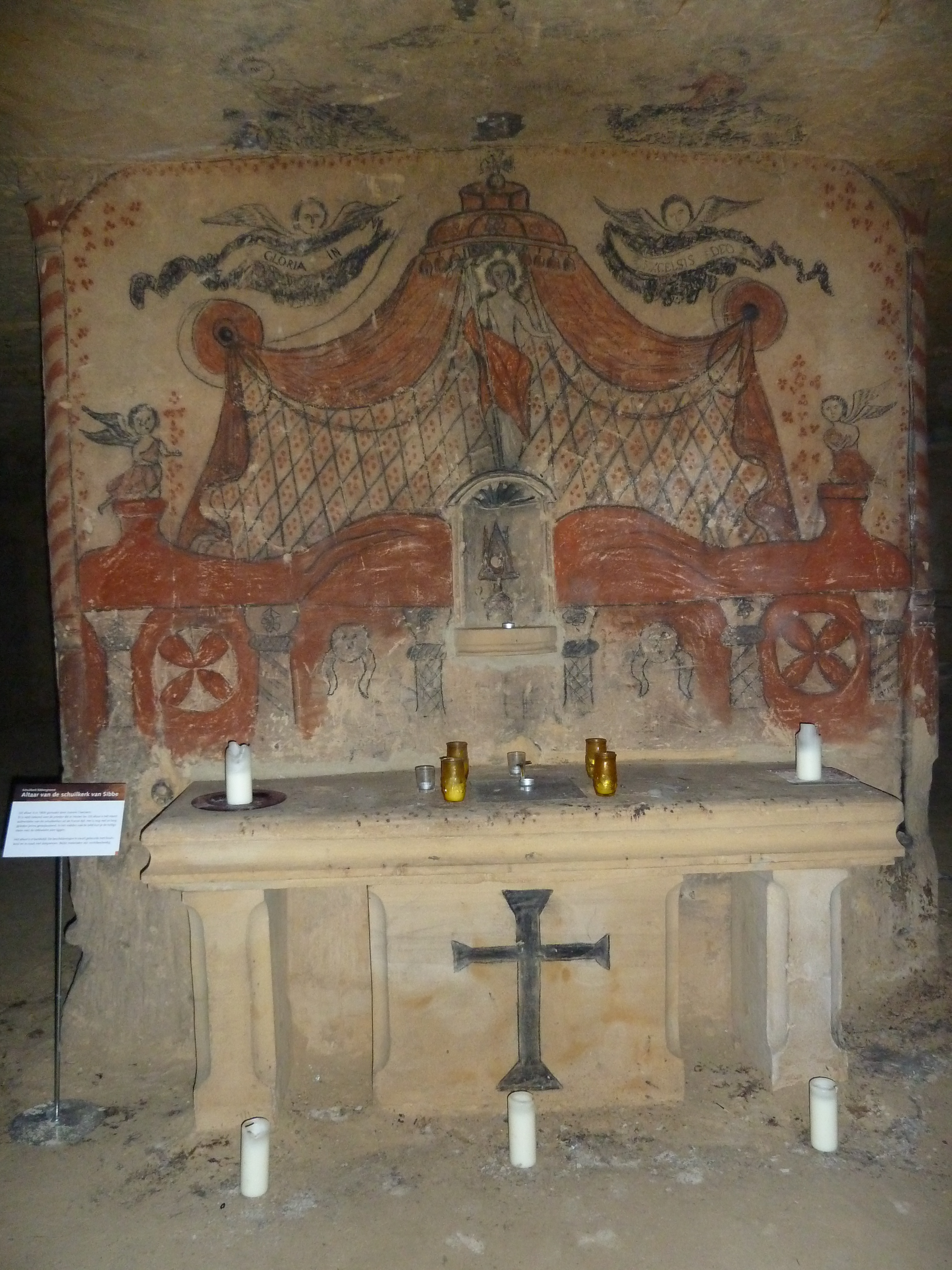
Sibberberg: French chapel

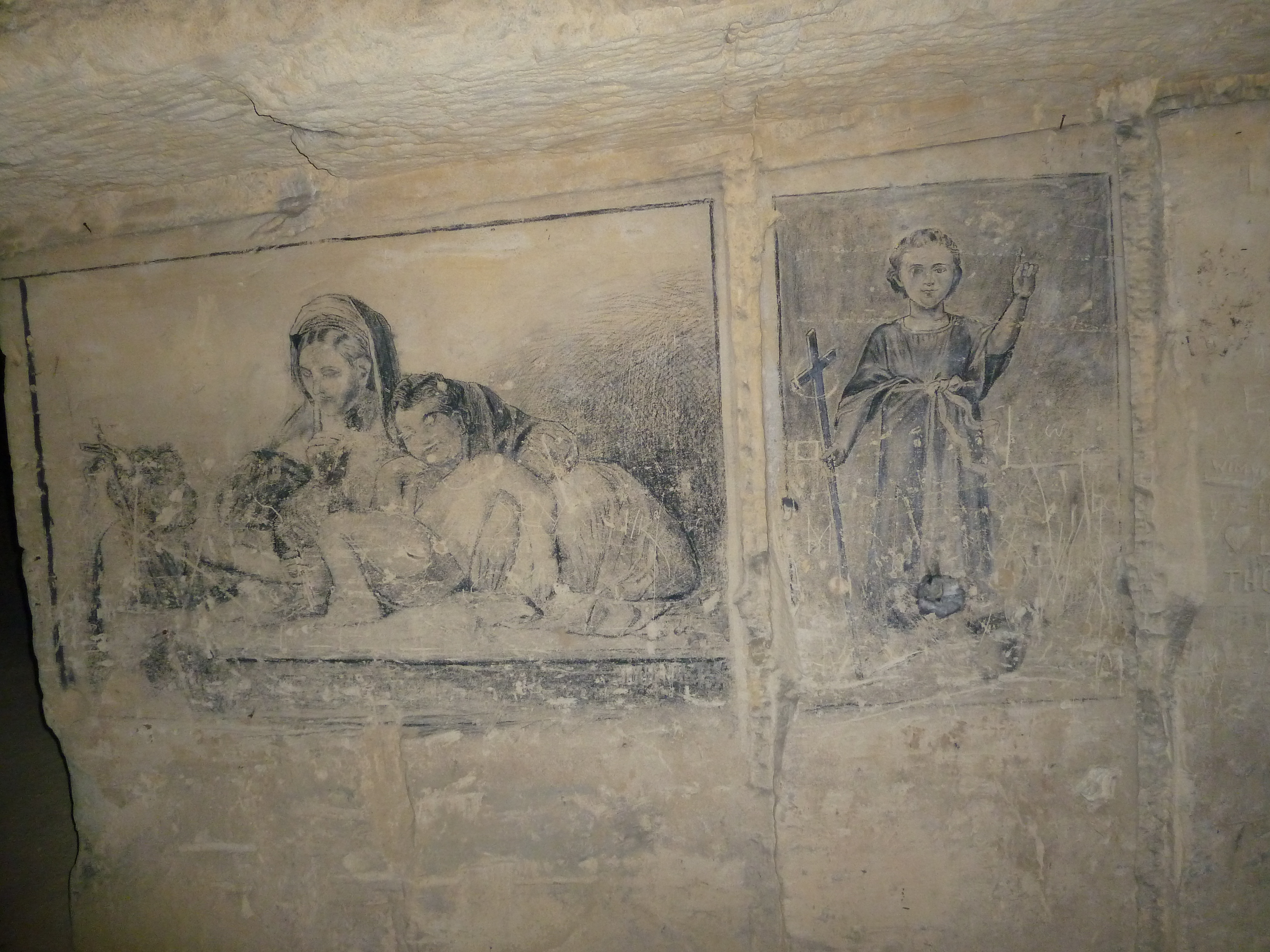
Sibberberg: charcoal drawings

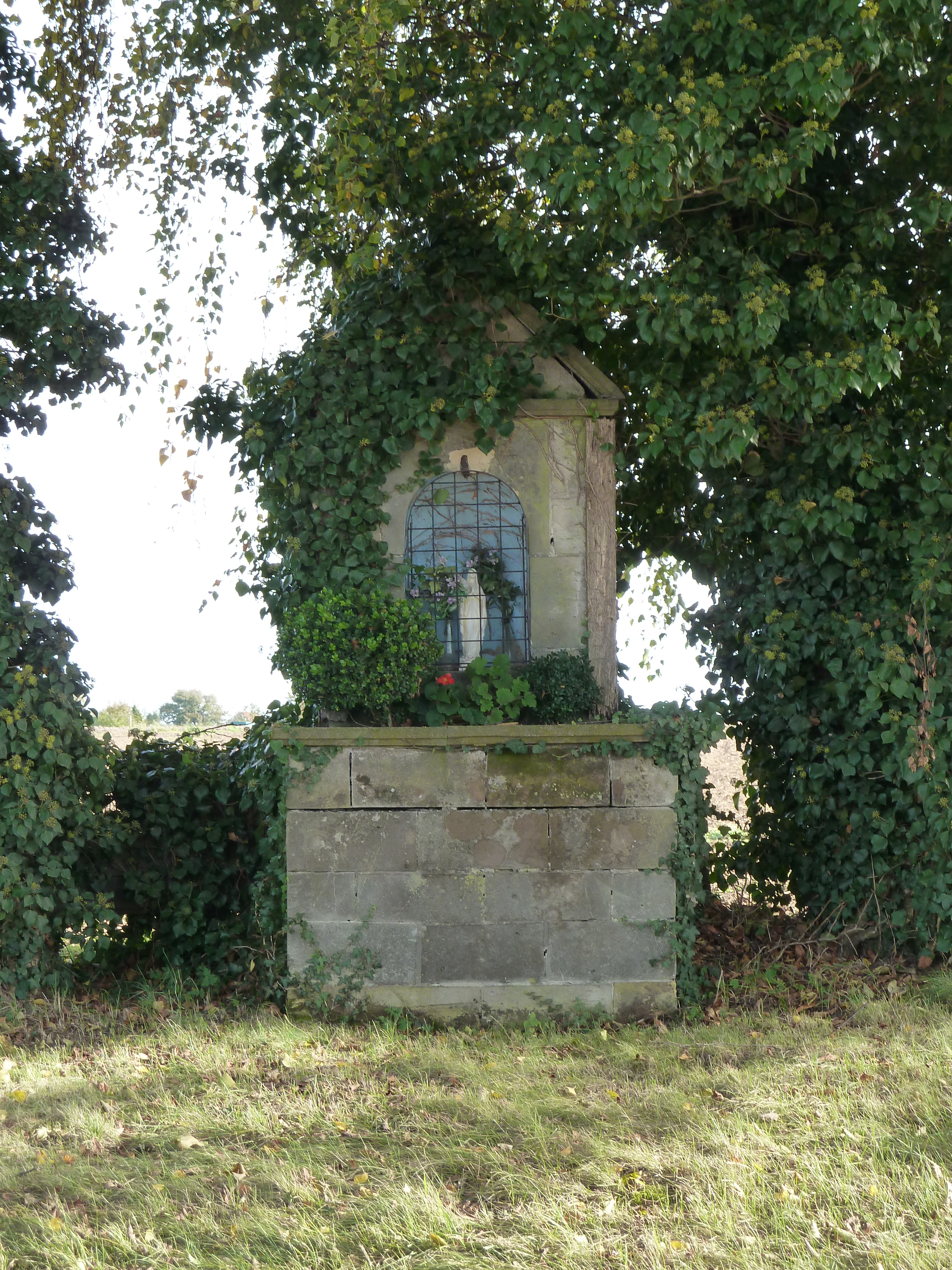
Chapel Daalhemerweg
