= Walem, Netherlands =

Walem
- Hamlet
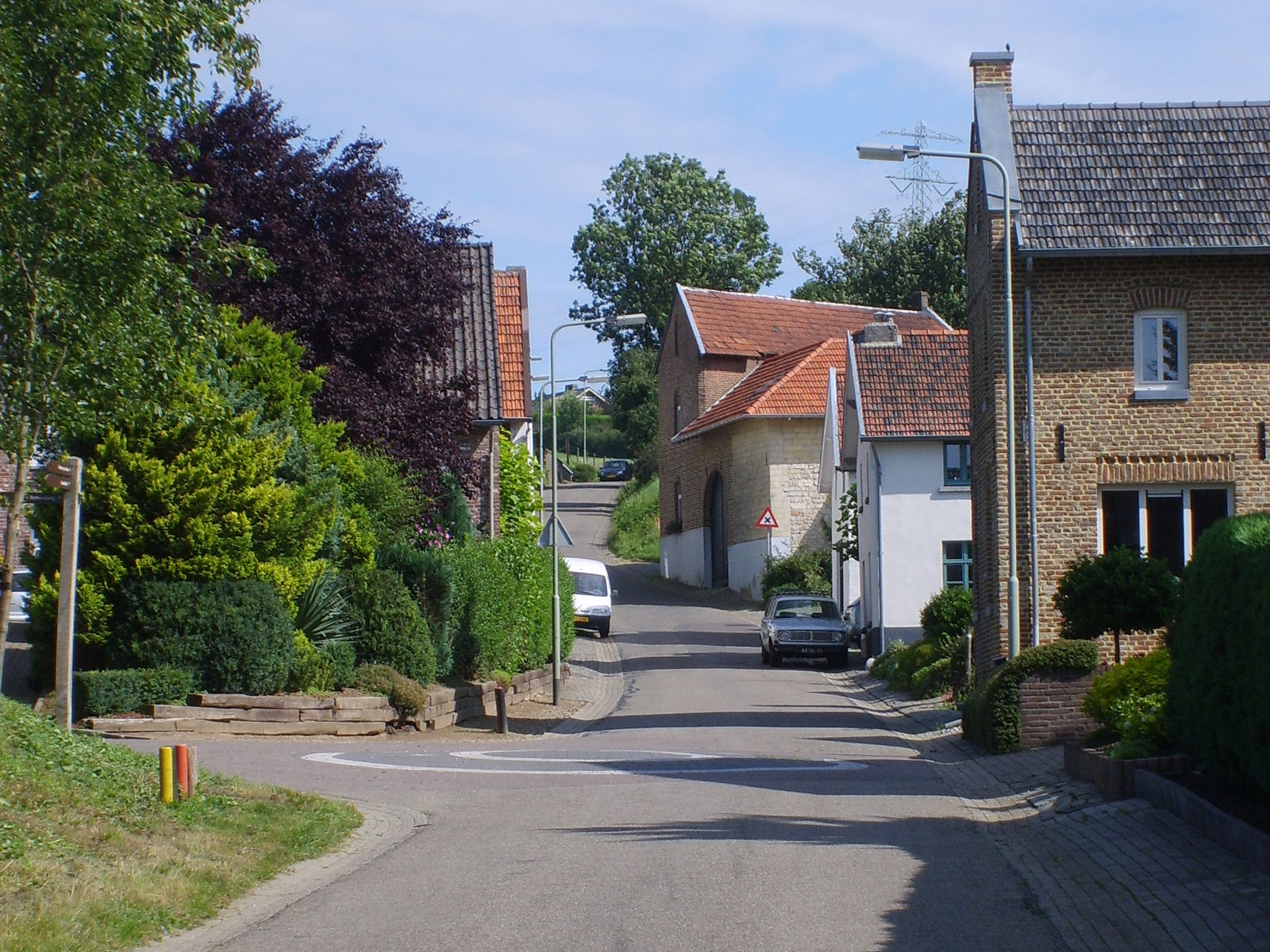
- Street view

- Location in the Netherlands Location in the province of Limburg in the Netherlands
- Coordinates: 50°52′7″N 5°52′7″E
- Country: Netherlands
- Province: Limburg
- Municipality: Valkenburg aan de Geul

Area
  - Total: 0.86 km^{2} (0.33 sq mi)
- Elevation: 115 m (377 ft)

Population (2021)
  - Total: 160
  - Density: 190/km^{2} (480/sq mi)
- Time zone: UTC+1 (CET)
  - Summer (DST): UTC+2 (CEST)
- Postal code: 6342
- Dialing code: 043

Walem is a hamlet with about 200 inhabitants in the Dutch province of Limburg. It is largely in the municipality of Valkenburg aan de Geul, but a small part lies in Voerendaal.

It was first mentioned in 1360 as Walheym, and means "settlement of the Walloons".

Walem has place name signs. It was home to 167 people in 1840.

== Gallery ==
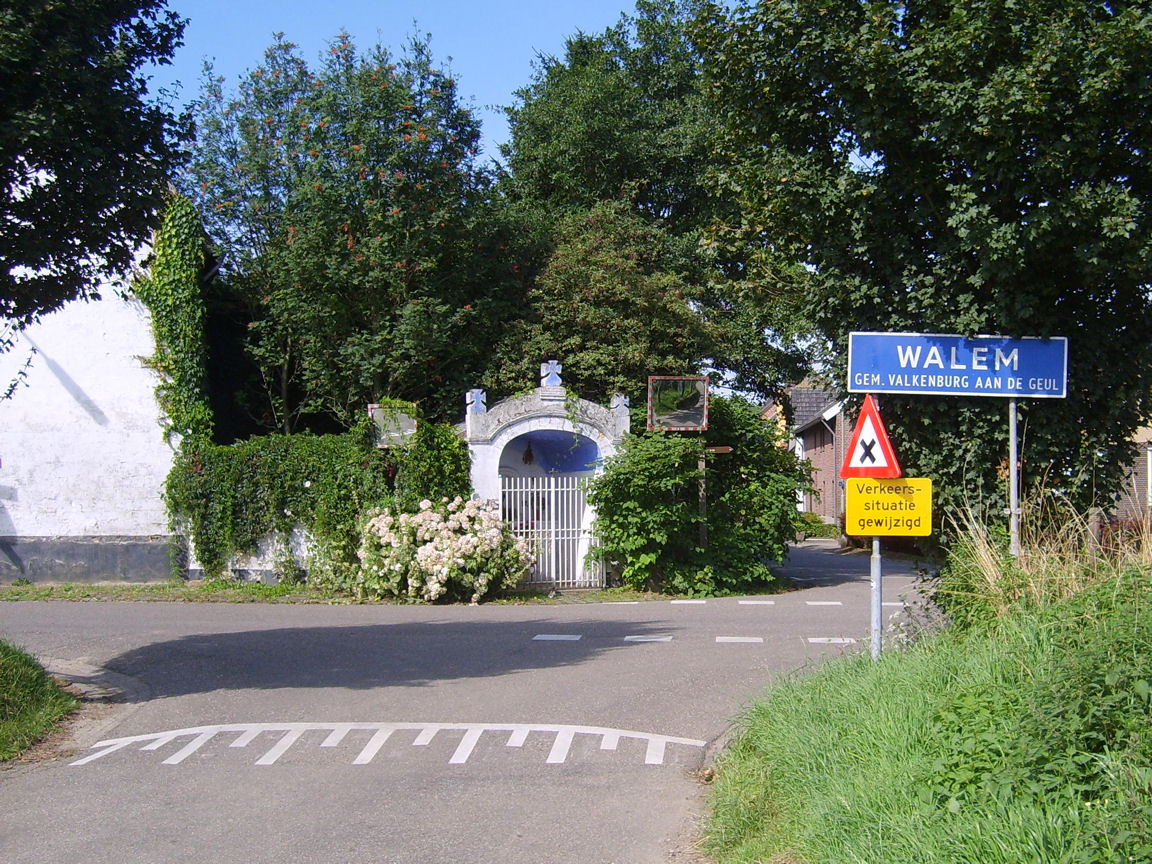
Place name, with in the background the Mary Chapel.
