= 2025 in architecture =

This article covers 2025 in architecture.

== Events ==
- January 7 onwards - Several architecturally significant buildings are destroyed in the January 2025 Southern California wildfires.
- March 16 - The 1906 Wilhelminatoren in Valkenburg suddenly and unexpectedly collapses. Nobody is hurt. It raises concerns about maintenance of national monuments in the Netherlands.
- November 3 - The medieval Torre dei Conti in Rome partially collapses while under conservation with one fatality.

== Buildings and structures ==
=== Cambodia ===
- Techo International Airport, in Phnom Penh, opened 9 September 2025

=== Hong Kong ===
- Kai Tak Sports Park, opened 1 March 2025

=== Italy ===
- Milan Olympic Village completed in June 2025.

=== Japan ===
- Naoshima New Museum of Art, opened 31 May 2025
- Tottori Prefectural Museum, in Tottori: opened 30 March 2025

=== Netherlands ===
- Fenix Museum, in Rotterdam: opened 16 May 2025

=== United States ===
- Doris Duke Theatre, in Becket, Massachusetts: expected to reopen after renovations on 9 July 2025
- Universal Epic Universe, in Orlando, Florida: opened 22 May 2025

== Awards ==
- AIA Gold Medal – Deborah Berke
- Pritzker Prize – Liu Jiakun
- Stirling Prize – Witherford Watson Mann for Appleby Blue Almshouse, Southwark, London

== Deaths ==
- January 3 - Hiroshi Hara, 88, Japanese architect (Kyōto Station, Umeda Sky Building, Sapporo Dome) (born 1936)
- February 2 - Luce Eekman, French architect (born 1933)
- February 4 (announced) - Adrian Snodgrass, Australian architect (born 1931)
- February 9 - David E. Sellers, American architect (born 1938)
- February 15 - M. Paul Friedberg, American landscape architect (born 1931)
- February 18 - Howard Burns, British architectural historian (born 1939)
- March 2 - Bruno Dias Souza, Indian architect (born 1925)
- March 6 - Ricardo Scofidio, American architect (High Line, MoMA) (born 1935)
- March 23 - Barbara Neski, American architect (born 1928)
- March 26 - David Childs, American architect (One World Trade Center) (born 1941)
- March 26 - Tamás Wachsler, Hungarian architect and politician (born 1965)
- March 29 - Harrison Fagg, American architect (born 1931)
- March 29 - Shelly Kappe, American architectural historian (born 1928)
- April 10 - Christoph Kohl, Italian-German architect and urban planner (Brandevoort) (born 1961)
- April 16 - Artak Ghulyan, Armenian architect (born 1958)
- April 20 - Kristin Feireiss, German architectural and design curator, writer, and editor (born 1942)
- April 22 - Zurab Tsereteli, Russian-Georgian sculptor (Birth of the New World, To the Struggle Against World Terrorism), painter, and architect (born 1934)
- April 29 - Robert Campbell, American architect and architecture critic (The Boston Globe) (born 1937)
- May 28 - Heliodoro Dols, 91, Spanish architect (Shrine of Torreciudad) (born 1933)
- May 30 - Alenka Kham Pičman, 93, Slovenian architect (born 1932)
- June 6 - Graham Gund, 84, American architect (born 1940)
- June 17- Léon Krier, 79, Luxemborgish architect (born 1946)
- July 29 - Helmut Swiczinsky, 81, Austrian architect (Coop Himmelb(l)au) (born 1944)
- September 14 - Sir Nicholas Grimshaw, 85, English architect (125 Park Road, Oxford Ice Rink, National Space Centre) (born 1939)
- September 28 - Sir Terry Farrell, 87, British architect and urban designer (MI6 Building, KK100) (born 1938)
- November 27 - Robert A. M. Stern, 86, American architect (15 Central Park West, 220 Central Park South) (born 1939).
- December 5 - Frank Gehry, 96, Canadian-American architect (Guggenheim Museum Bilbao, Gehry Residence, Louis Vuitton Foundation) (Pritzker Prize winner 1989) (born 1929).

== See also ==
- Timeline of architecture
- Category:Buildings and structures destroyed by the January 2025 Southern California wildfires
