= Kirchsteigfeld =

Urban district of Potsdam, Germany

- Stadtteil of Potsdam
- Interactive map of Kirchsteigfeld
- Location within Germany Location within Brandenburg
- Coordinates: 52°21′43″N 13°08′06″E
- Country: Germany
- State: Brandenburg
- District: Urban district
- City: Potsdam

Population (2024-12-31)
  - Total: 5,051
- Time zone: UTC+01:00 (CET)
  - Summer (DST): UTC+02:00 (CEST)

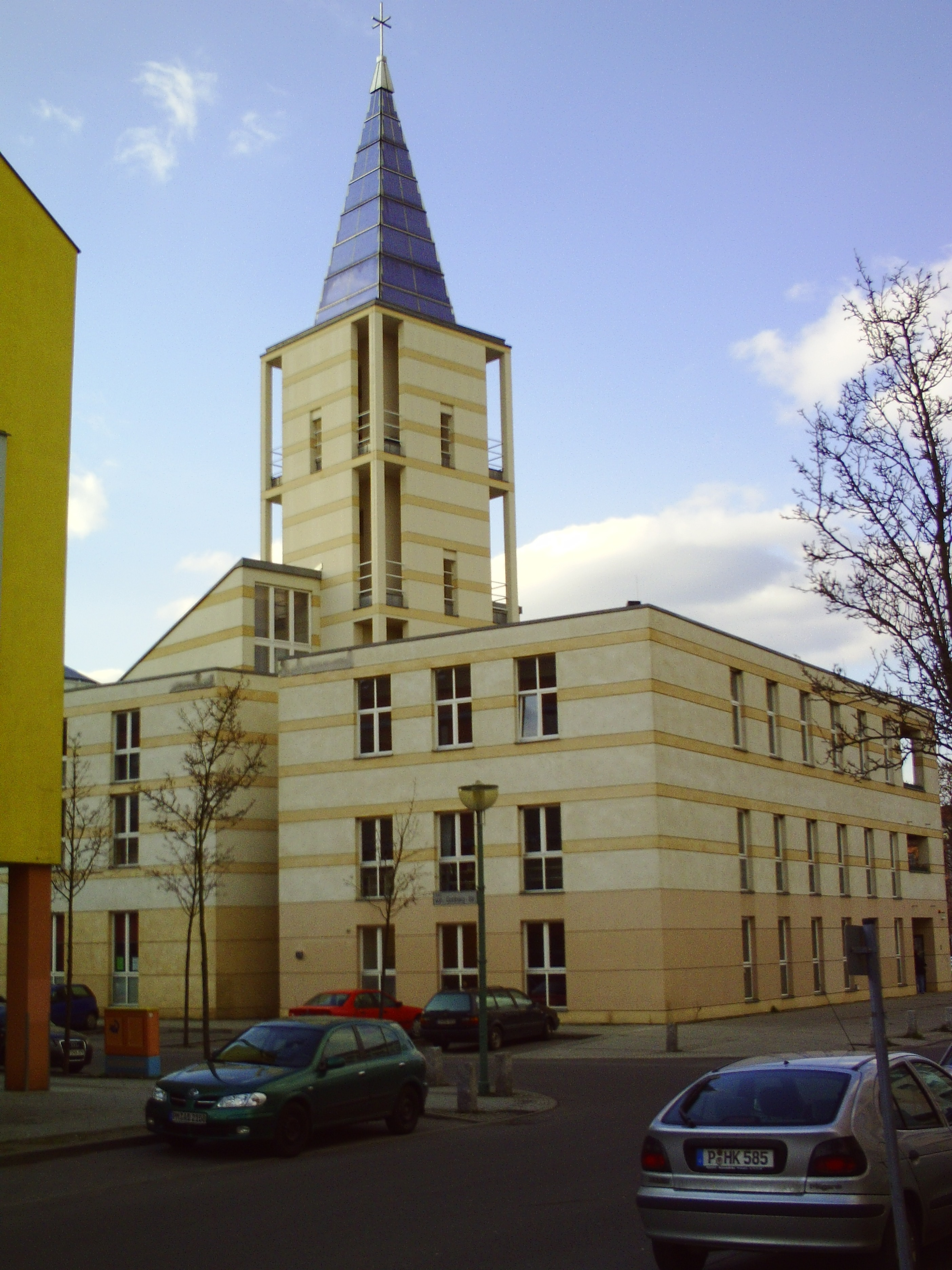
The futuristic church by Augusto Romano Burelli

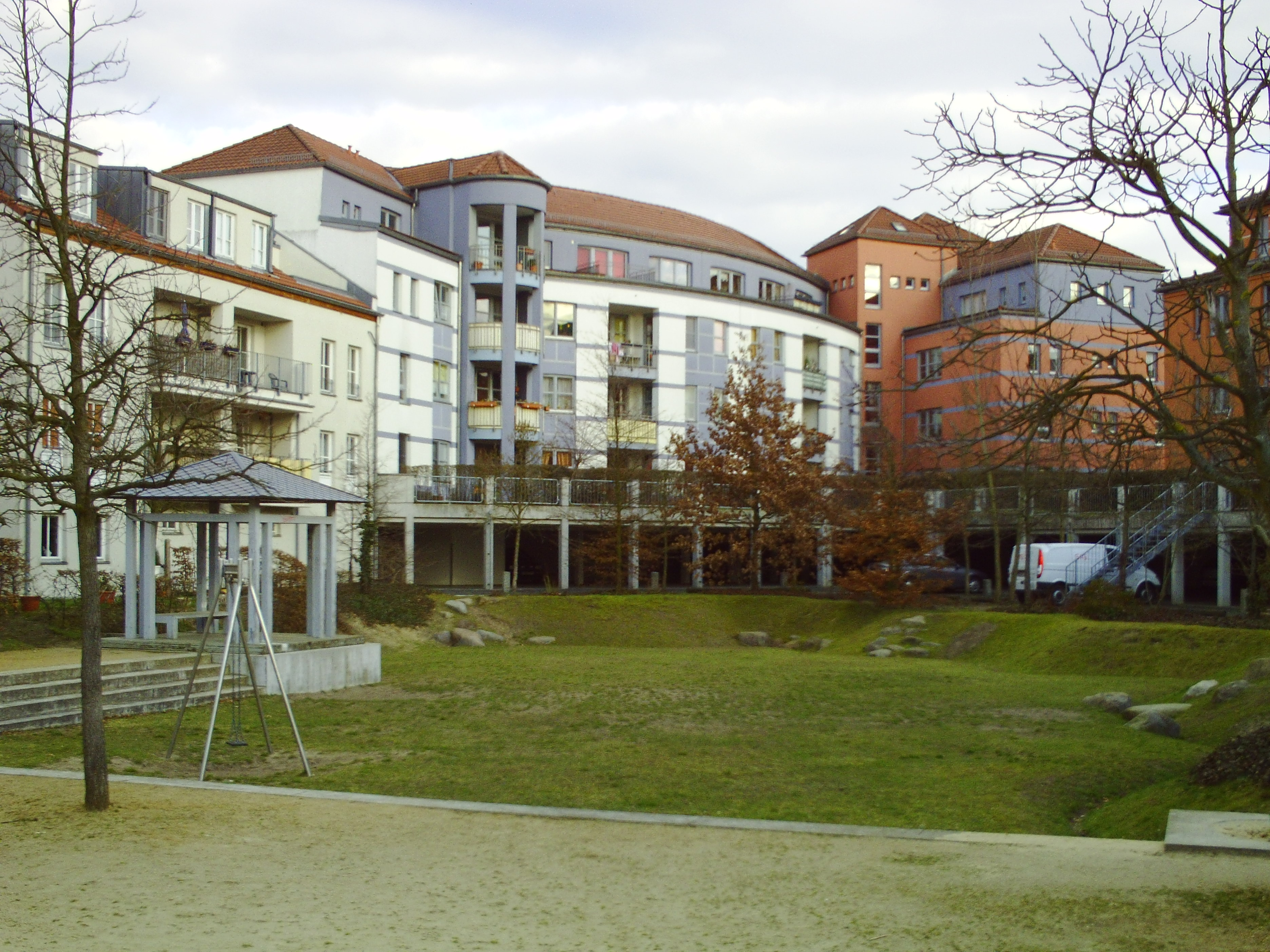
An inner courtyard

Kirchsteigfeld is a district (Stadtteil) of the city of Potsdam, Germany. As of December 2024, it had 5,051 inhabitants. The suburb, located in the southeasternmost part of Potsdam, is one of the largest and most ambitious housing projects realized in the new federal states after German reunification. The new quarter was developed between 1993 and 1998 and is considered a prominent example of Postmodern architecture. Led by the architectural firm Krier-Kohl (Rob Krier and Christoph Kohl) and with the participation of 25 other architects, one of the largest construction projects in East Germany at the time created a new urban district for 4,900 residents.

The initiative for the project came from the Berlin developer Groth + Graalfs, who purchased the land in 1991. The developer signed an urban development contract with the local government, which ensured public funding and required a commitment to social housing and infrastructure. The plan was to create an urban district that combined all functions of urban life. Areas for living, working, and leisure, as well as a range of amenities and short walking distances were all intended to be integrated, to keep traffic low and the streets lively throughout the day. Located approximately 24 km from Berlin and 5 km from Potsdam's historic center, the district spans 60 hectares and includes 2,680 apartments, schools, daycare centers, sports and leisure facilities, offices, and a church.

== Architecture and urban design ==
Krier and Kohl's master plan, which won the architectural competition, was inspired by traditional European urban models while also being influenced by the area's topography. The design emphasized a block perimeter development approach with different variations—open, semi-open, and closed blocks—comprising similar, terraced individual houses on separate plots with quiet courtyards and active streets. The urban layout transitions from a strict grid structure near the forest and the A 115 motorway in the east, expanding towards the west. This layout also intentionally integrates with the neighboring Plattenbau housing estate "Am Stern" and the village of Drewitz. The design of the individual buildings was handled by Krier · Kohl and 22 other architectural teams, leading to a diverse and distinctive urban landscape.

The landscape-defining elements, such as the Hirtengraben (a small stream) with its riparian vegetation and the "Priesterweg" nature monument—an alley of century-old oaks—were integrated into the urban concept as structuring elements. A wide park strip was created along the Hirtengraben, which flows from the Parforceheide forest into the Nuthe river. It includes a newly dammed small lake that serves as a protected biotope at the western edge of the settlement. The vibrant design, featuring individual and harmoniously coordinated units with a "striking colorfulness," is widely considered a success, although one critic described it as a "competition of cuteness." Signposts in front of the residential units indicate the lead architectural firm for each building. A functional infrastructure with commerce, services, and public facilities, including a futuristic-looking church by Italian architect Augusto Romano Burelli at a central square, has contributed to a high level of residential satisfaction. The Wiener Zeitung quoted Krier from a presentation at the Vienna University of Technology:

On the question of residential satisfaction in the new, lushly green and visibly 'human-scaled' project, Krier responded with a coquettish challenge that it was 'disgustingly positive for architecture critics.' Then he was off to the buffet.

— Wiener Zeitung

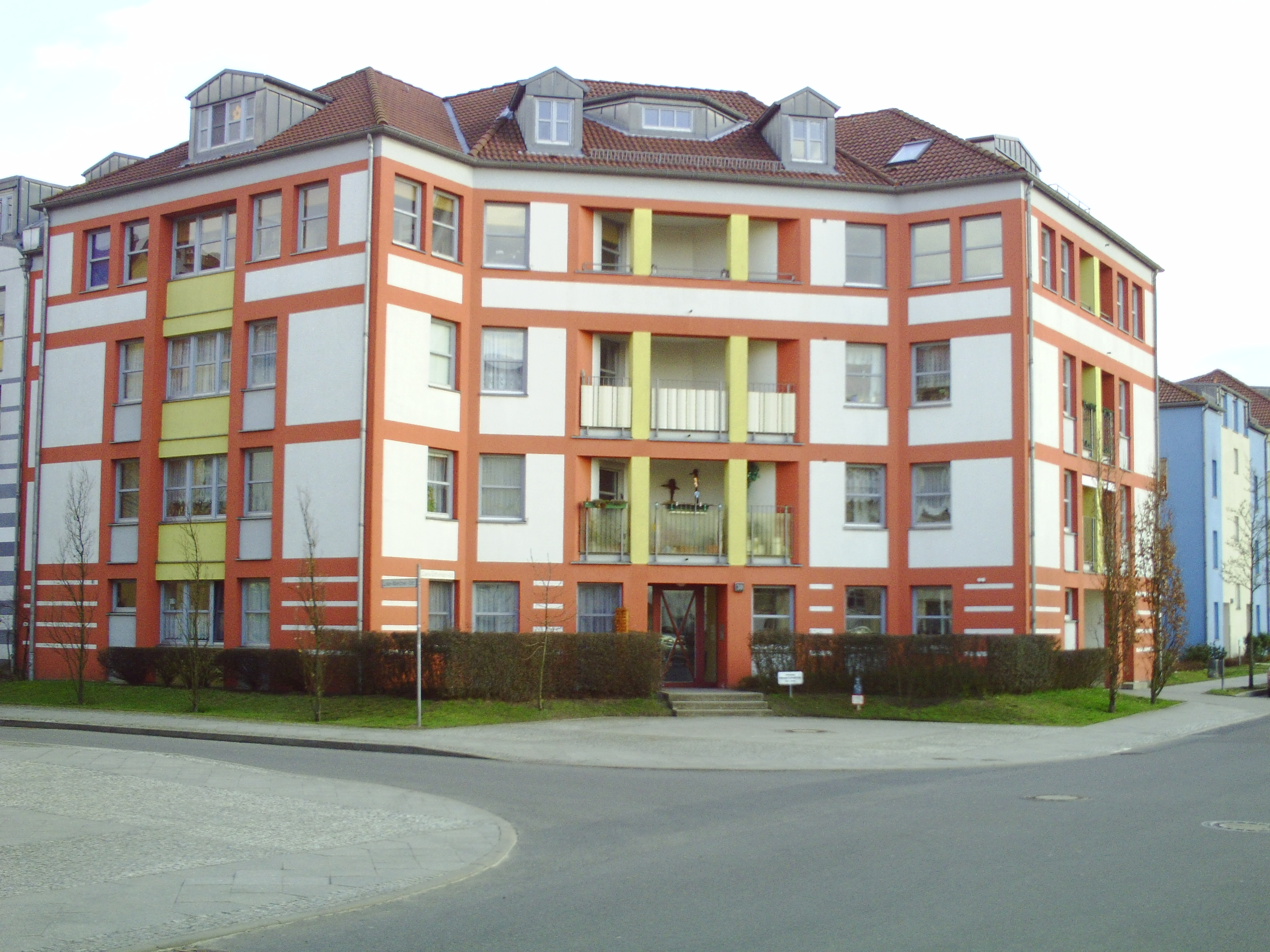

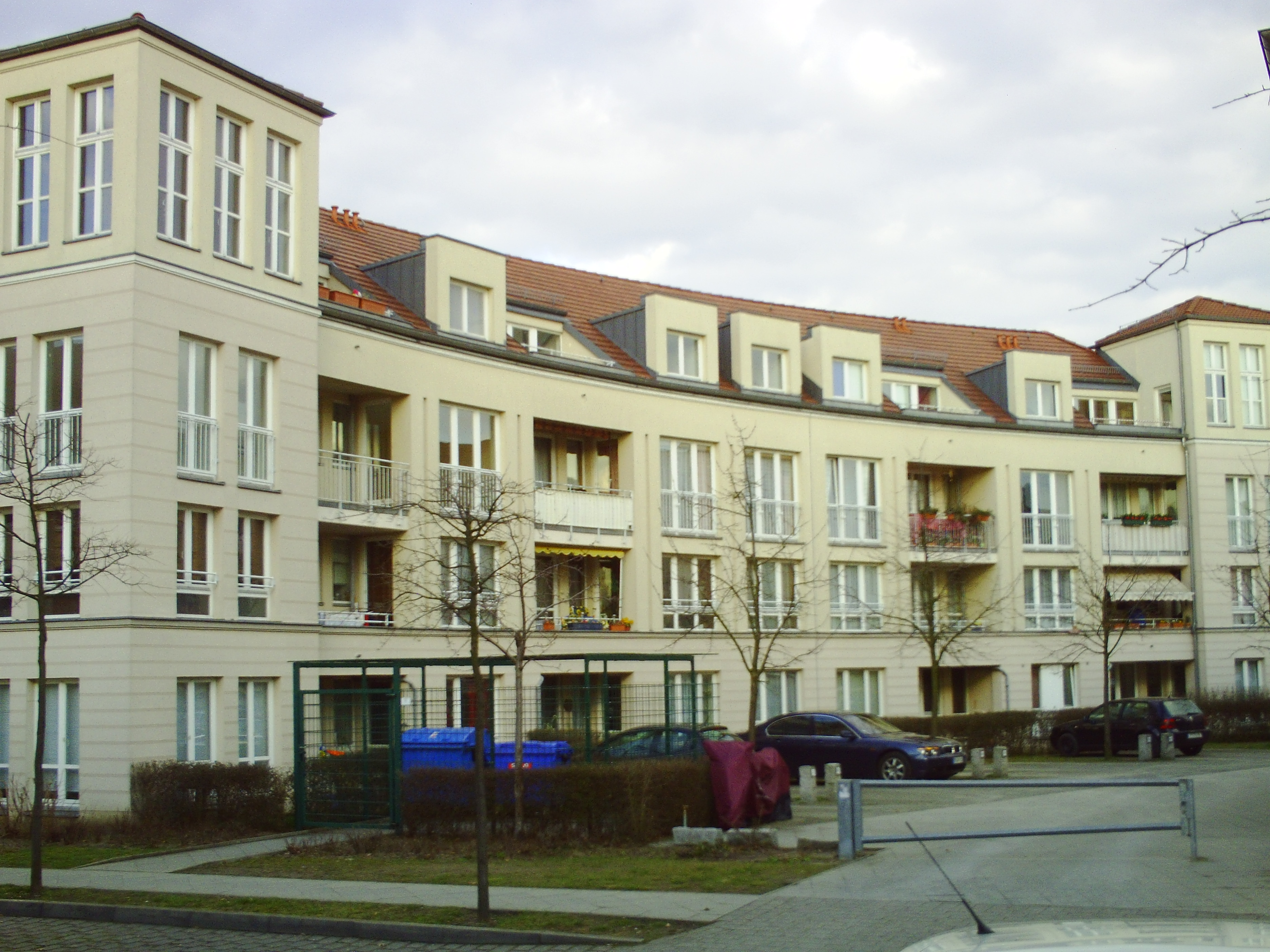

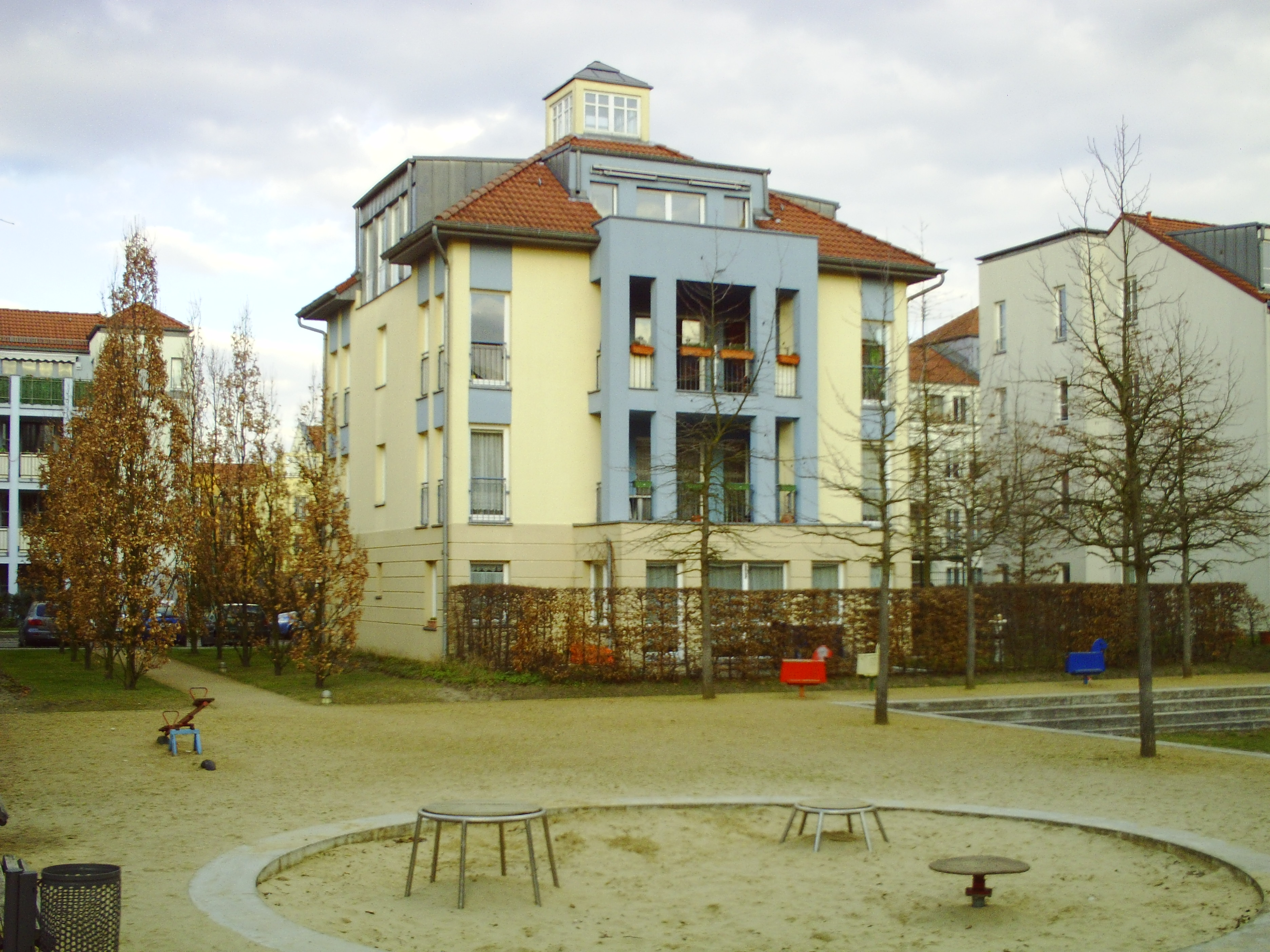

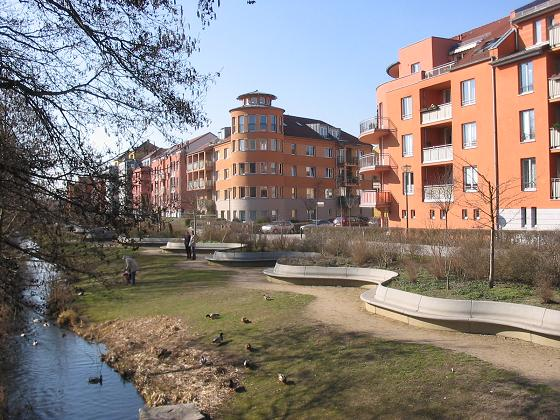

== Expansion plans ==
Despite the initial goal of creating a "mixed-use city of short distances," the planned commercial area with 5,000 jobs was never realized due to a lack of demand for multi-story office spaces in the mid-1990s. As a result, the district primarily functions as a commuter town, which has led to some dissatisfaction among residents. This discontent led to the formation of a residents' initiative in 2018 and, separately, the Anwohnerinitiative Kirchsteigfeld (Kirchsteigfeld Residents' Initiative) in 2024, both of which advocate for greater transparency in city politics and increased citizen participation.

New plans for the undeveloped area between Ricarda-Huch-Straße and the A 115 motorway were developed in 2023. This new concept, created by the city administration, property owners, and external planners, aims to create an urban area with a mix of commercial, residential, and social facilities, strengthening the existing district center. The plans, which are subject to a city council resolution in mid-2024, include the construction of up to 1,000 apartments for an estimated 1,900 residents and commercial buildings with up to 1,600 jobs by the 2030s.
