= Judiciary City =

Coordinates: 49°36′29″N 6°08′01″E

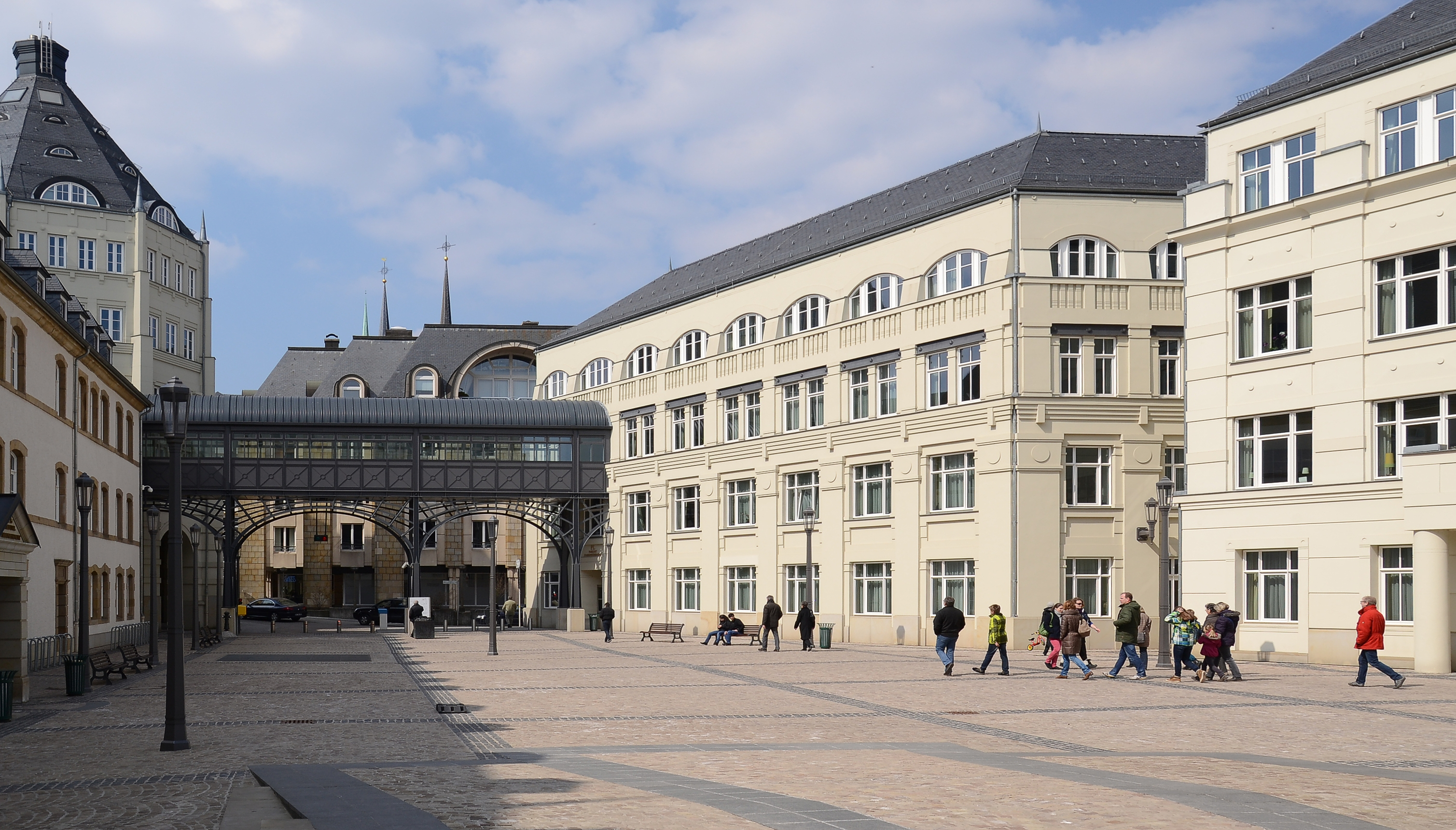
Judiciary City - Plateau St. Esprit

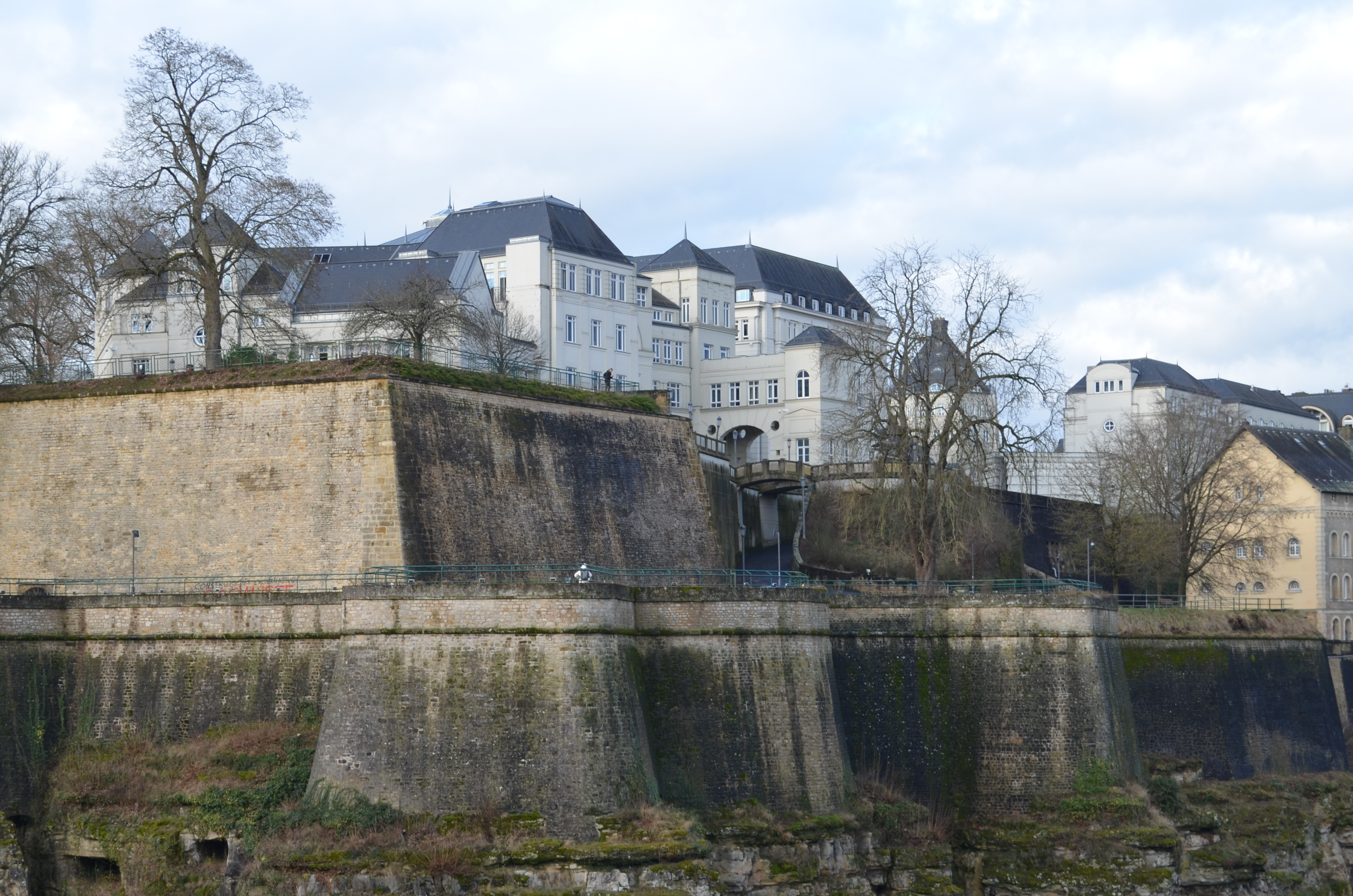
The Judiciary City seen from Fort Verlorenkost

The Judiciary City (French: Cité judiciaire) is a site in Luxembourg City, in southern Luxembourg, that houses a number of courts and legal offices. It consolidates all of Luxembourg City's judicial buildings, except those related to the institutions of the European Union, on one site, and greatly expands their capacity.

The City sits on the Saint-Esprit plateau, sandwiched between the Alzette and the Pétrusse, in the southern part of the central Ville Haute district. Its buildings are built in modern Moselle Baroque, to match the surrounding area, and were designed by Robert Krier. Planned since 1991, the first stone of the City was laid on 7 October 2003, and it was officially inaugurated five years later, on 6 October 2008. The buildings contain 43,000 square metres (460,000 sq ft) of floor space, including 300 offices and sixteen courtrooms.
