= Heunsberg =

Dutch hill

Coordinates: 50°51′27″N 5°49′54″E

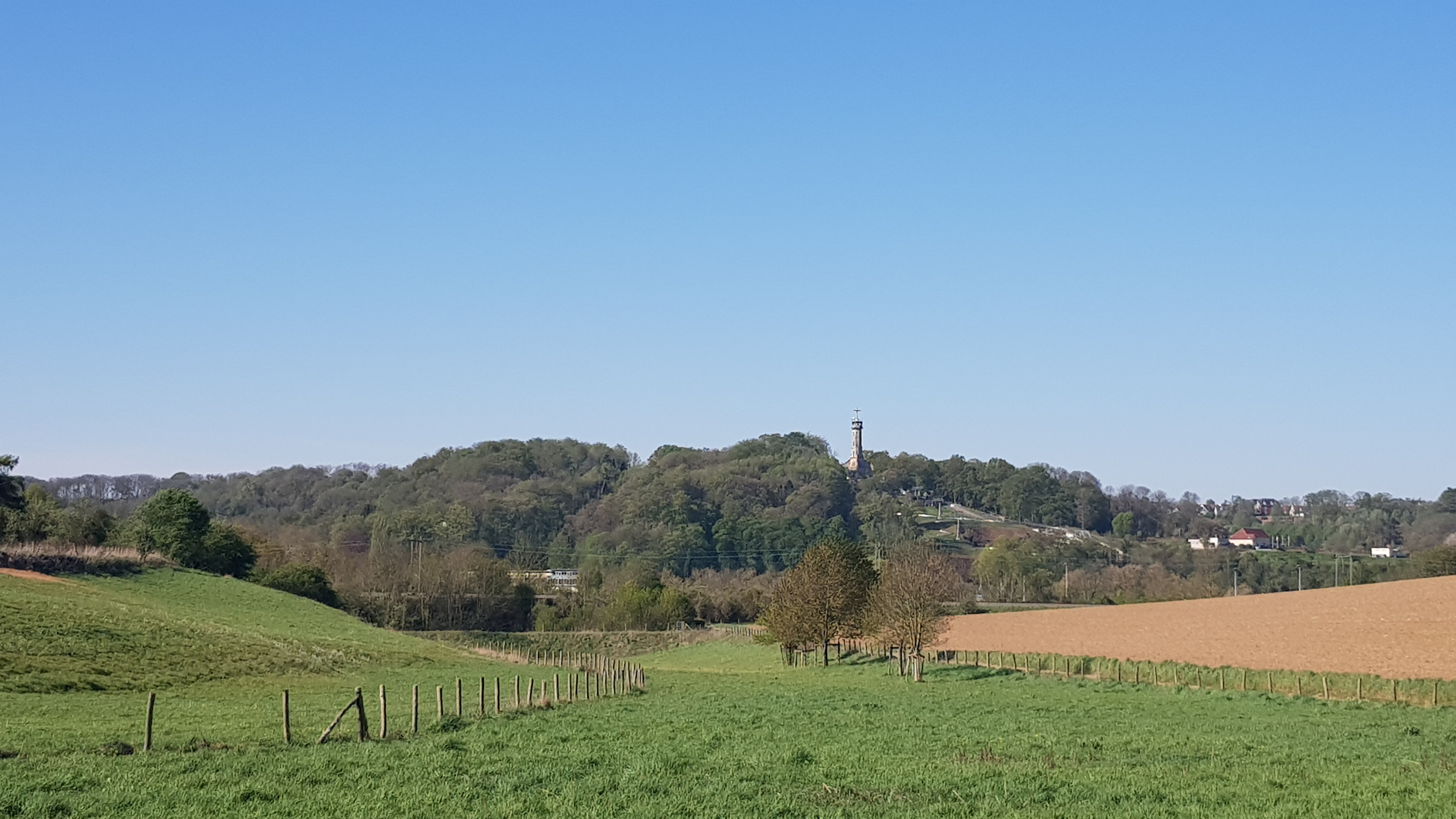
View of the Heunsberg from the other side of the Geuldal. The now collapsed Wilhelminatoren is in the distance.

The Heunsberg is a 145 meter high hill in the South Limburg area of the Netherlands, part of the municipality of Valkenburg aan de Geul. The hill is located directly south of the center of Valkenburg and the hamlet of Neerhem. The hill extends from the Sibbergrubbe in the east (with the Biebosch behind it) to the Daalhemerweg in the west. The Heunsberg in addition runs south to the village of Sibbe. The hill is a northern extension of the Margraten Plateau. On the northeast side the hill is bordered by the Geuldal.

== Etymology ==
The toponym Heunsberg is probably derived from Heinsberg. From the early twelfth century, the lords of Valkenburg, who inhabited the castle on the Heunsberg, descended from the House of Valkenburg-Heinsberg. In 1085, Goswin I, the Count of Heinsberg is mentioned as "Gozwinus [...] de castello quod dictir Hennesberg" (Goswin from the Castle of Heinsberg).

== Tourist attractions ==
There are a number of tourist attractions on and in the Heunsberg. These are:

- The ruins of Valkenburg Castle, with the Castle Quarry and Velvet Cave located below it, on a northern area of the Heunsberg. Notable to be the only castle in the Netherlands built on a hill.
- A model coal mine and the Feestgrot (a restaurant located in a cave) in the Grotto of Daalhem (Daalhemergroeve), both also open to the public, on the west side of the hill.
- There is a toboggan path present at the Heunsberg hill with two tracks.
- A laser-tag facility is located in a cave beneath Heunsberg hill.

The old Jewish cemetery of Valkenburg lies on the slope near the castle ruins. There is also a camping site on near the Heunsberg.

=== Former attractions ===
The Wilhelminatoren, a Rijksmonument that stood upon the Heunsberg suddenly collapsed on March 16, 2025. The tower reportedly had a zipline for tourists, and was a popular destination for locals, with views from the tower being able to see the City of Aachen on a clear day. The historical lookout tower was closed for maintenance at the time of the collapse.
