= Brandevoort =

Neighbourhood of Helmond in the Netherlands

Coordinates: 51°28′N 5°37′E

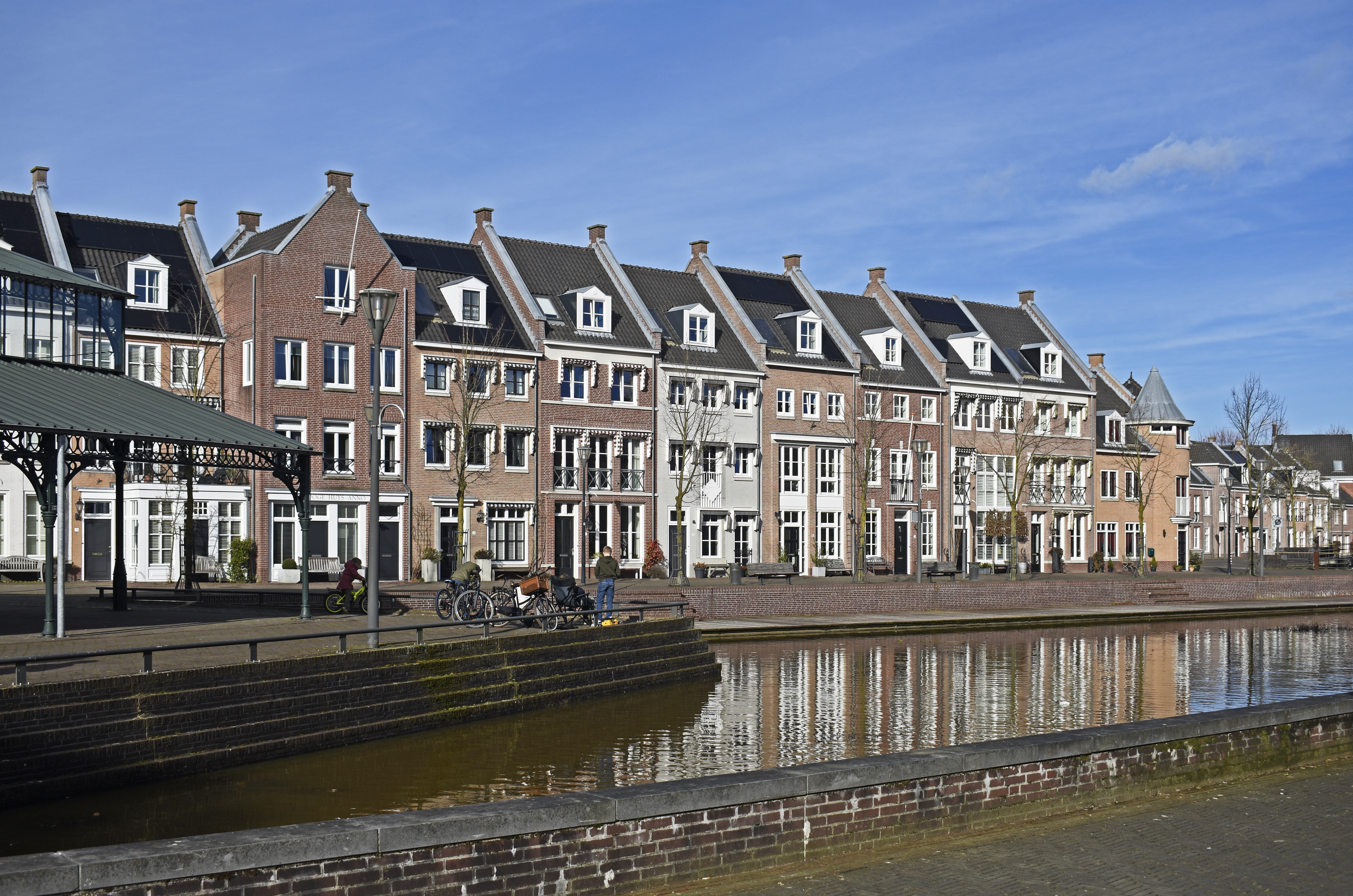
Main square, 2025.

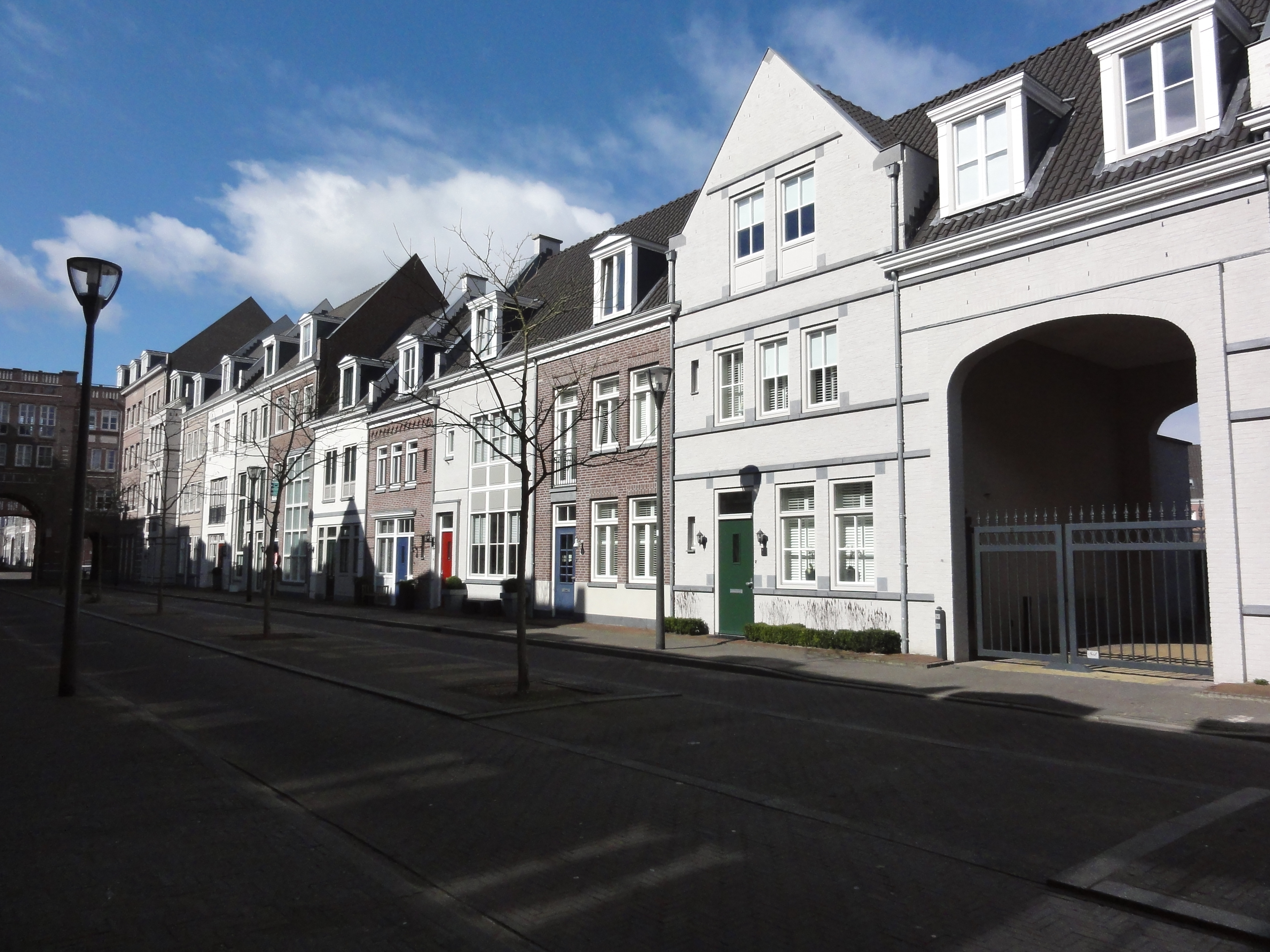
Townhouses

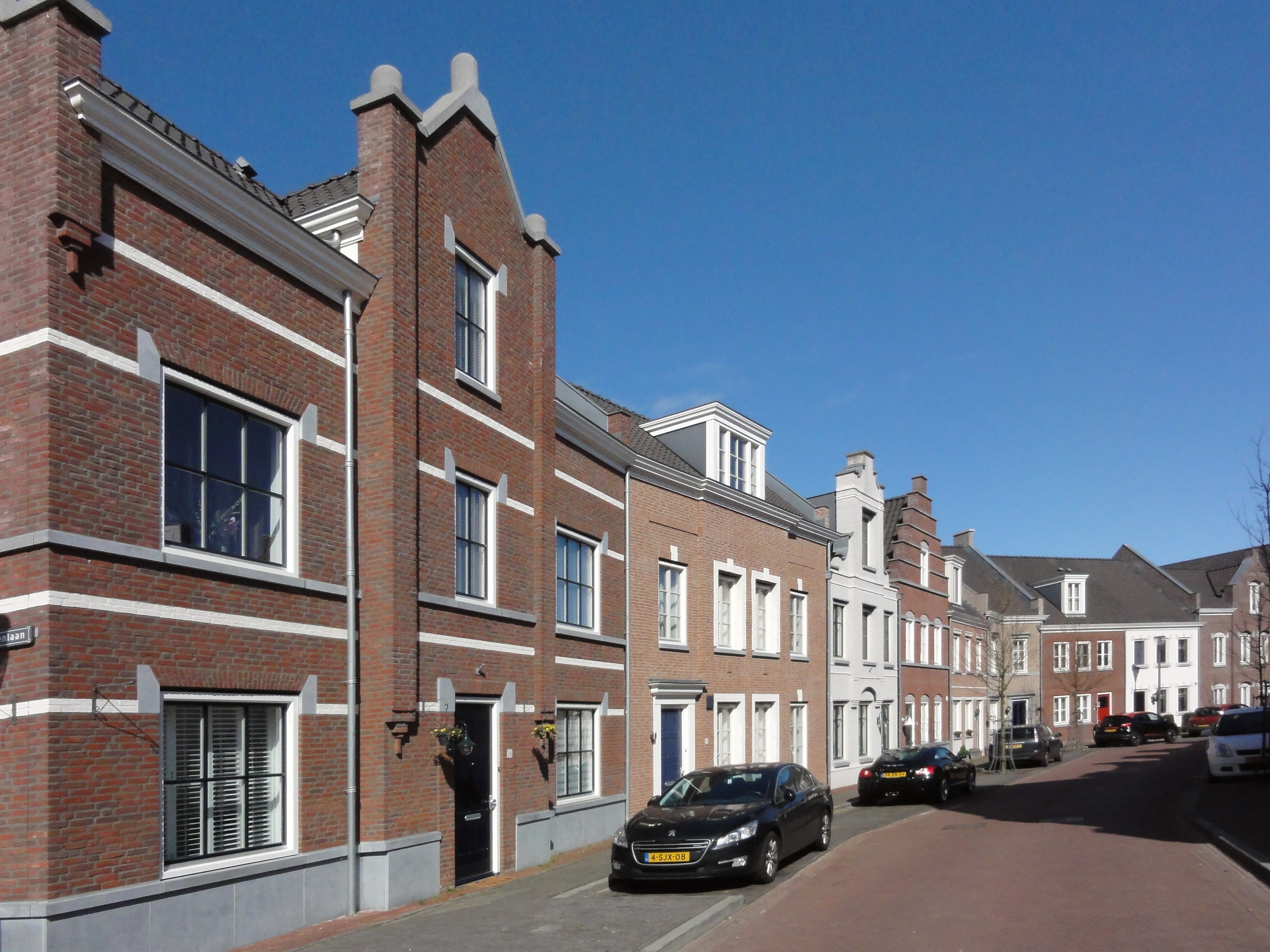

Brandevoort is a neighbourhood of Helmond in North Brabant, the Netherlands, located in the south-west of the municipality, just north of Mierlo. It is a Vinex-location and was built according to the principles of New Urbanism and New Classical architecture. As of 1 January 2023, the neighbourhood is home to some 11,560 people, up from about 9,000 at the beginning of 2014.

The farmland had previously been part of Mierlo but was annexed by Helmond in 1995. The overall plan of the projected Vinex neighbourhood was designed and guarded by the architects Paul van Beek (Paul van Beek landschappen BNT Amsterdam), Rob Krier and Christoph Kohl (K·K Gesellschaft von Architekten mbH, Berlin, now Christoph Kohl Stadtplaner Architekten GmbH), and Maarten Ouwens (Wissing Stedenbouw bv Barendrecht), in collaboration with Grontmij (with Jan Nijhof and Mariëlle Kok). Construction started around 1997 and is scheduled to finish in 2017. The neighbourhood will then have a population of approximately 18,000 and a total of 6,000 houses and apartments.

Brandevoort is built around a central “fortress” called De Veste (“The Stronghold”), built in the style of the old cities like Amsterdam and other cities that started as a fortress (see maps of Brandevoort). Around this central core, there are the three small quarters of Schutsboom, Brand and Stepekolk, collectively called De Buitens ("The Outers"). These are built to have an atmosphere referred as "Brabantse gezelligheid" ("Brabantian cosiness/homeliness"). Although fitting together in the master plan, like in organically grown cities, these small villages have their own urban identity.

In the centre of Brandevoort there is a small-scale commercial area with several shops and a sizeable supermarket. There is a health care center, a community center, children day care and two primary schools. Brandevoort also has its own uniquely designed railway station, Helmond Brandevoort, which was built in the same style as the neighbourhood.
