= Christoph Kohl (architect) =

Italian architect and urban planner (1961–2025)

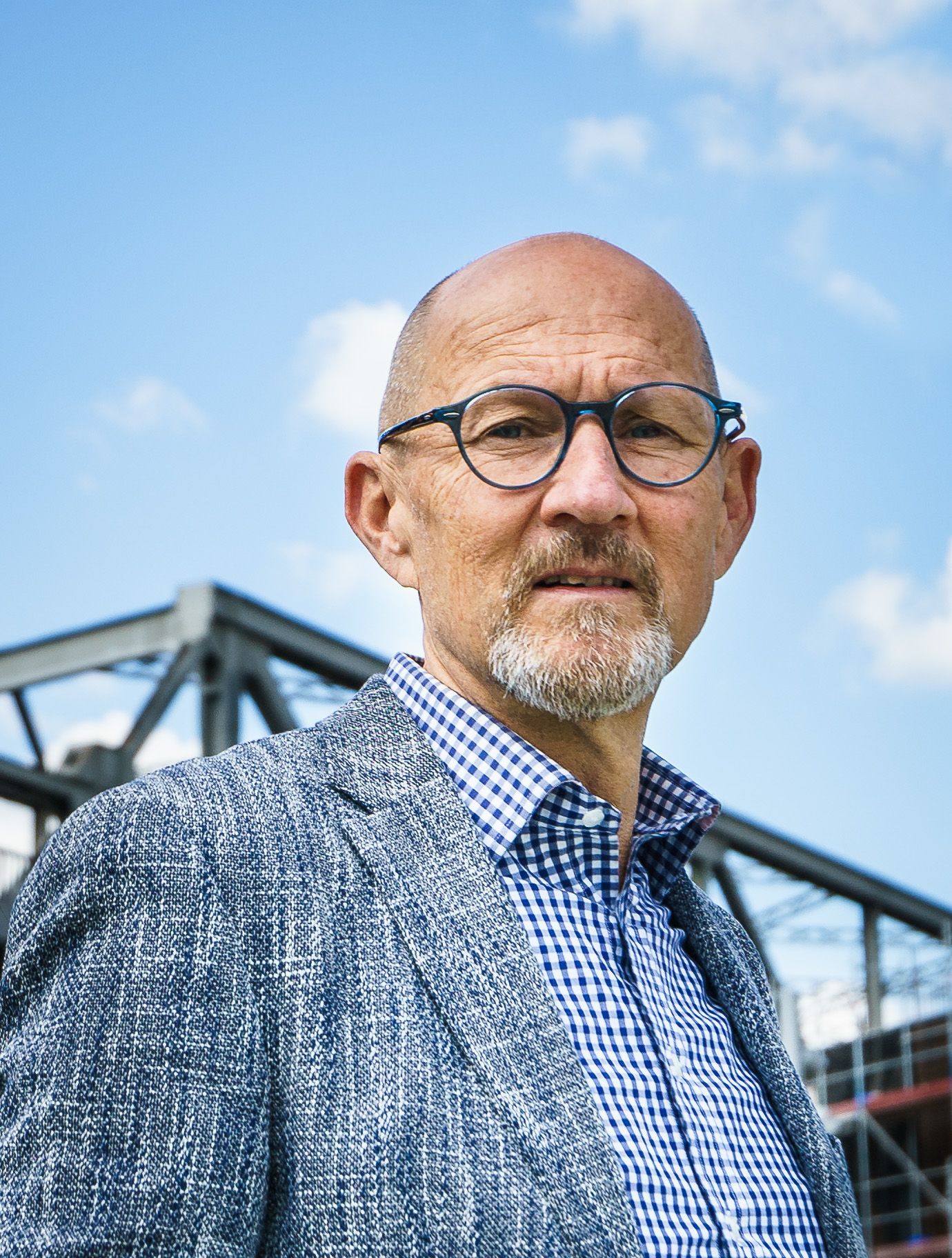
- Kohl in 2020
- Born: 20 February 1961; Bolzano, South Tyrol, Italy
- Died: 10 April 2025 (aged 64); Berlin, Germany
- Occupations: Architect, Urban planner

Christoph Kohl (20 February 1961 – 10 April 2025) was an Italian architect and urban planner based in Berlin, known for his contributions to New Classical architecture and New Urbanism in Europe.

== Life and career ==
Kohl studied architecture at the University of Innsbruck (1981–1984), the Technical University of Vienna (1984–1986), and graduated from the Università Iuav di Venezia in 1988. From 1993, he ran an architectural office in partnership with Rob Krier in Berlin.

In 2010, he became the sole owner of Christoph Kohl Gesellschaft von Architekten mbH, which became CKSA | Christoph Kohl Stadtplaner Architekten GmbH in 2018. In 2024, he founded CKSA | Christoph Kohl Städtebau Agrotektur UG (hb), with a focus on nature-integrated urbanism.

He advocated for compact, human-scaled, and historically rooted urban forms. From 2018 to 2021, he was a visiting professor at the Anhalt University of Applied Sciences in Dessau and taught at the Vietnamese-German University (VGU) in Ho Chi Minh City in 2020–2021. Beginning in 2022, he contributed regular columns on urban culture to the South Tyrolean newspaper Dolomiten.

Christoph Kohl died unexpectedly at his Berlin office on 10 April 2025, at the age of 64. He was a committed advocate for human-centered urbanism, believing that cities should be built for people, not investors — a vision that continues to resonate through his work and influence.

== Selected projects ==
- Kirchsteigfeld, Potsdam, Germany (1992–1997)
- Brandevoort, Helmond, Netherlands (from 1996)
- Stadsbleek, Oldenzaal, Netherlands (from 2003)
- Centrumgebied Vleuterweide, Utrecht, Netherlands (2005–2011)
- Speicherstadt Brauhausberg, Potsdam, Germany (2009–2015)
- Krefeld-Fischeln, Krefeld, Germany (from 2015)
- GoWest (former Reemtsma tobacco factory), Berlin, Germany (from 2017)
- Burgplatz-Passage, Leipzig (2017–2019)
- Duisburger Dünen (DAG masterplan), Duisburg, Germany (2021, 1st prize)

== Publications ==
- Identitätsstiftender Städtebau und Architektur für die heutige Gesellschaft: Das Beispielprojekt Brandevoort. In: Umweltpsychologie 14(1), 2010, pp. 130–149.
- With Rob Krier: Town Spaces. Contemporary Interpretations in Traditional Urbanism, Birkhäuser, 2003/2006. ISBN 3-7643-6942-6
- With Rob Krier: Potsdam Kirchsteigfeld – Eine Stadt entsteht, awf-verlag, 1997. ISBN 3-933093-00-7
- With Rob Krier: The Making of a Town: Potsdam-Kirchsteigfeld, Papadakis Publishers, 1999. ISBN 1-901092-15-1
