= Rob Krier =

Luxembourgish architect and theorist (1938–2023)

Rob Krier (10 June 1938 – 20 November 2023) was a Luxembourgish sculptor, architect, urban designer, and theorist. He was a professor of architecture at Vienna University of Technology, Austria. From 1993 to mid-2010s he worked in partnership with architect Christoph Kohl in a joint office based in Berlin, Germany.

He was the older brother of fellow architect Léon Krier. Both are well-known representatives of New Urbanism and New Classical Architecture.

== Career ==
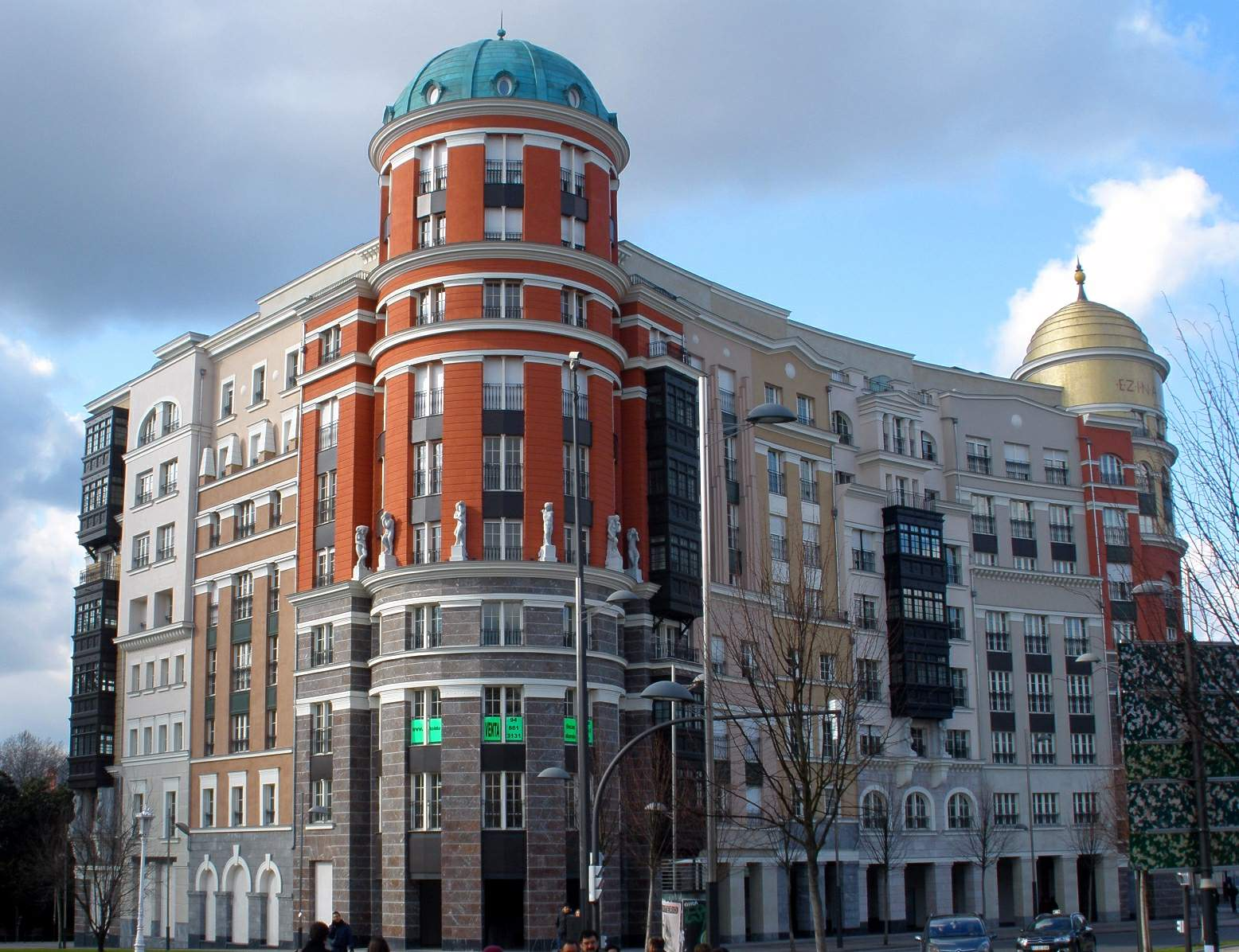
Artklass Building in Bilbao, Spain

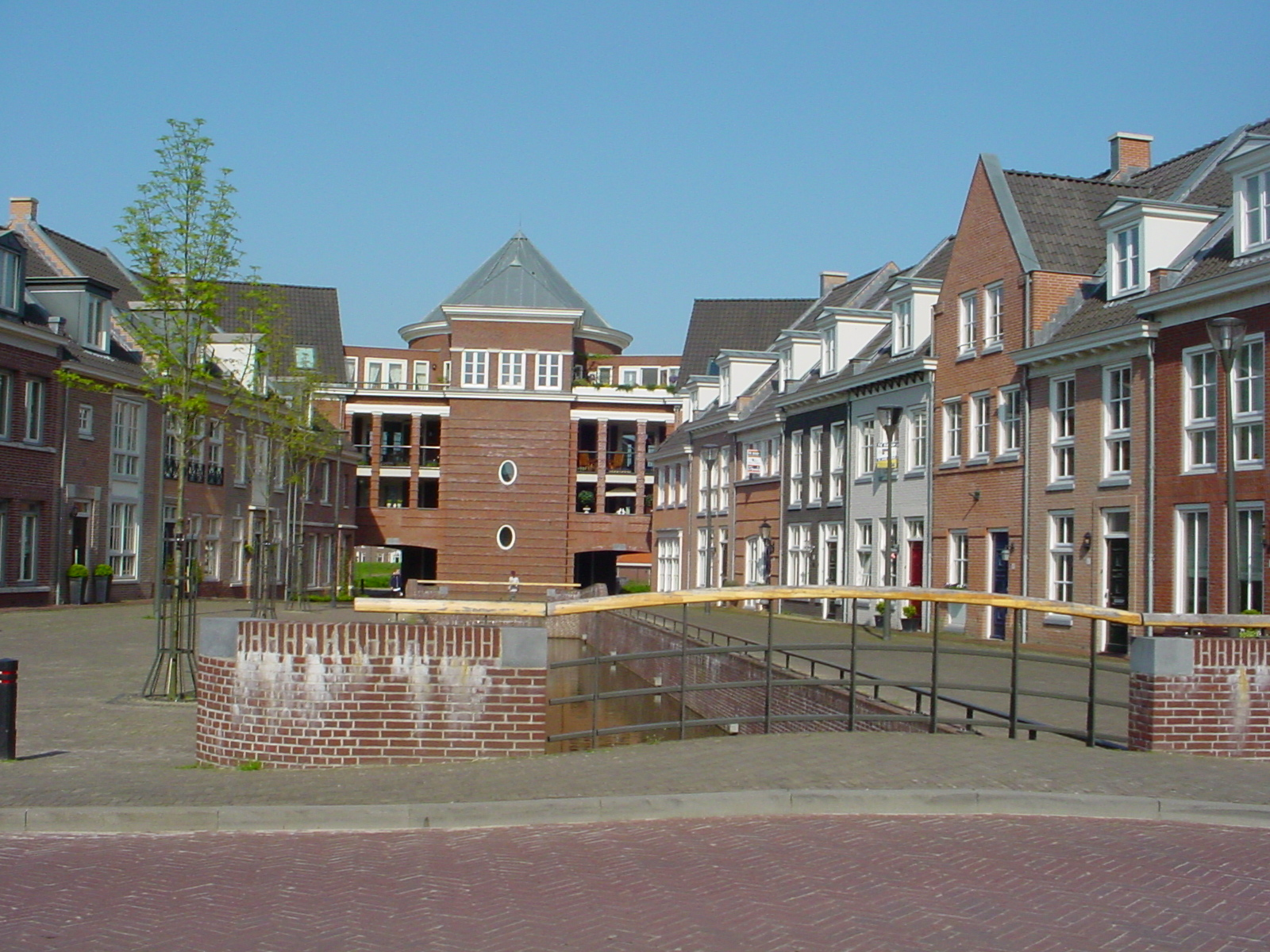
Brandevoort in Helmond, Netherlands

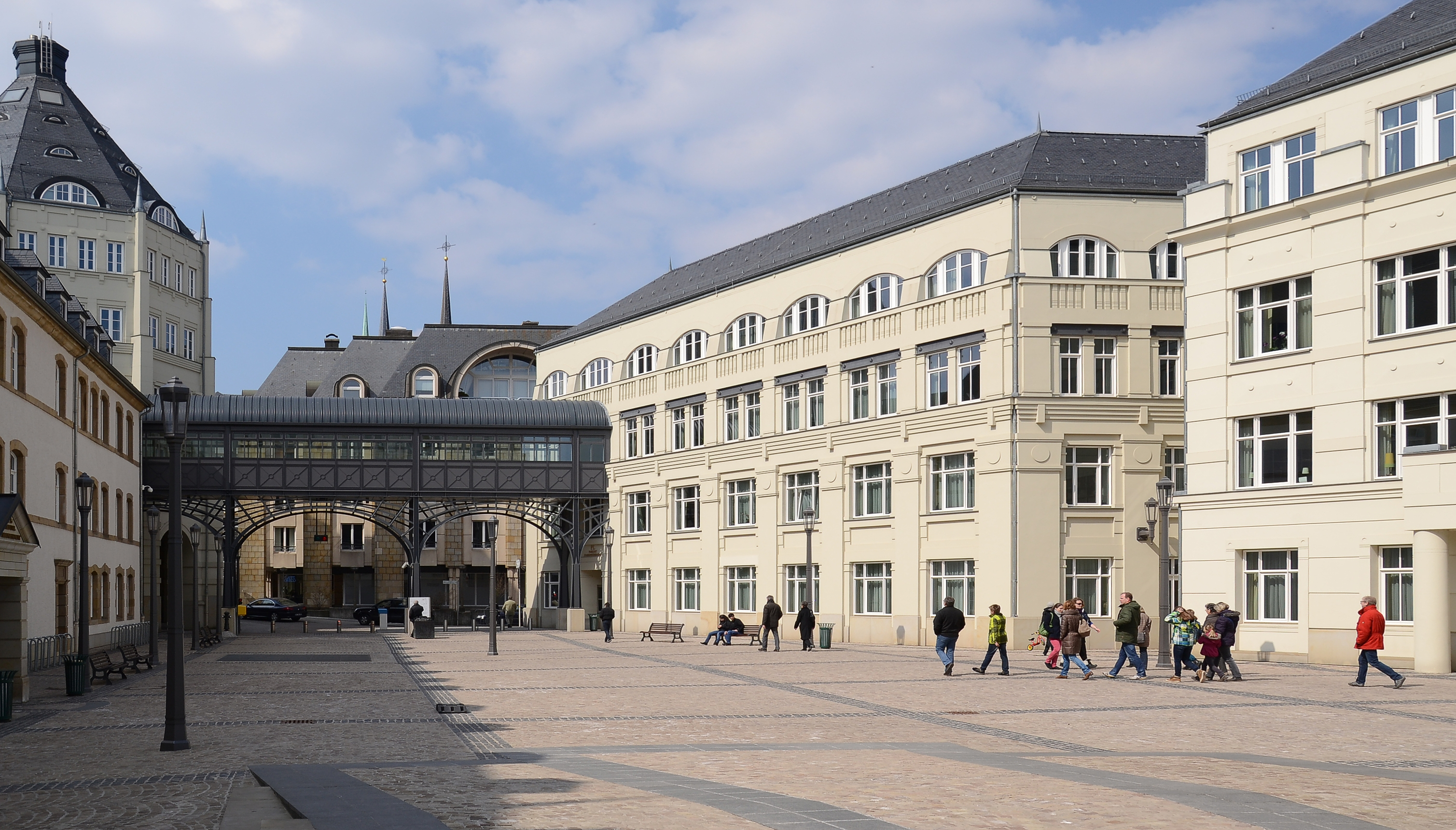
Judiciary City in Luxembourg City, Luxembourg

Krier studied architecture at the Technical University of Munich from 1959 to 1964. After graduating, he worked with Oswald Mathias Ungers in Cologne and Berlin (1965–1966) and Frei Otto in Berlin and Stuttgart (1967–1970). From 1973 to 1975, he was an assistant in the school of architecture at the University of Stuttgart. In 1975, he was guest professor at the École polytechnique fédérale de Lausanne, in Switzerland. From 1976 to 1998, he was professor of architecture at Vienna University of Technology. In addition, in 1996, he was a guest professor at Yale University, in the United States.

From 1976 to 1994, Krier had his own architect's office in Vienna. From 1992 until 2004, he ran a joint office with Nicolas Lebunetel in Montpellier, France. In 1993, he also founded a joint office with Christoph Kohl in Berlin. most recently incorporated as “Krier ∙ Kohl Gesellschaft von Architekten mbH”. Since June 2010, the renamed KK Gesellschaft von Architekten mbH has been backed by Rob Krier as senior advisor.

Krier first came to international attention with his 1975 book Stadtraum, which was translated into English under the title Urban Space in 1979, reprinted as Stadtraum / Urban Space in 2005 Krier contributed theoretically and practically to several key projects, including Ritterstrasse (1977–80) and Rauchstrasse (1980) in Berlin, Breitenfurterstrasse in Vienna (1981–87), and Kirchsteigfeld in Potsdam (1992–97).

== Death ==
Krier died on 20 November 2023 in Berlin, at the age of 85.

== Publications ==
- Stadtraum in Theorie und Praxis (1975), Karl Krämer, Stuttgart. Translated into English, French, Italian, Spanish. English translation: Urban Space (1979), Academy Editions, London
- Urban Projects 1968-1982 (1982), Rizzoli International
- On Architecture (1982), Academy Editions, London
- Architectural Composition (1988), Academy Editions
- The Making of a Town. Potsdam - Kirchsteigfeld (1997), with Christoph Kohl, Papadakis Publishers
- Town Spaces. Contemporary Interpretations in Traditional Urbanism (2003), Krier Kohl Architects, Basel/Berlin/Boston
- Figures. A Pictorial Journal (2005), Papadakis Publisher, London
- Stadtraum / Urban Space (2005), Reprint of "Stadtraum in Theorie und Praxis“ (1975) / "Urban Space“ (1979), Umbau-Verlag Solingen
- Cité Judiciaire Luxembourg 1991-2008 (2010), Edition Axel Menges, Stuttgart/London

== Awards ==
- Athena Medal from the Congress for the New Urbanism, 2009
- Driehaus Architecture Prize, 2022
