= Wilhelminatoren =

Tower in Valkenburg, Netherlands (1906–2025)

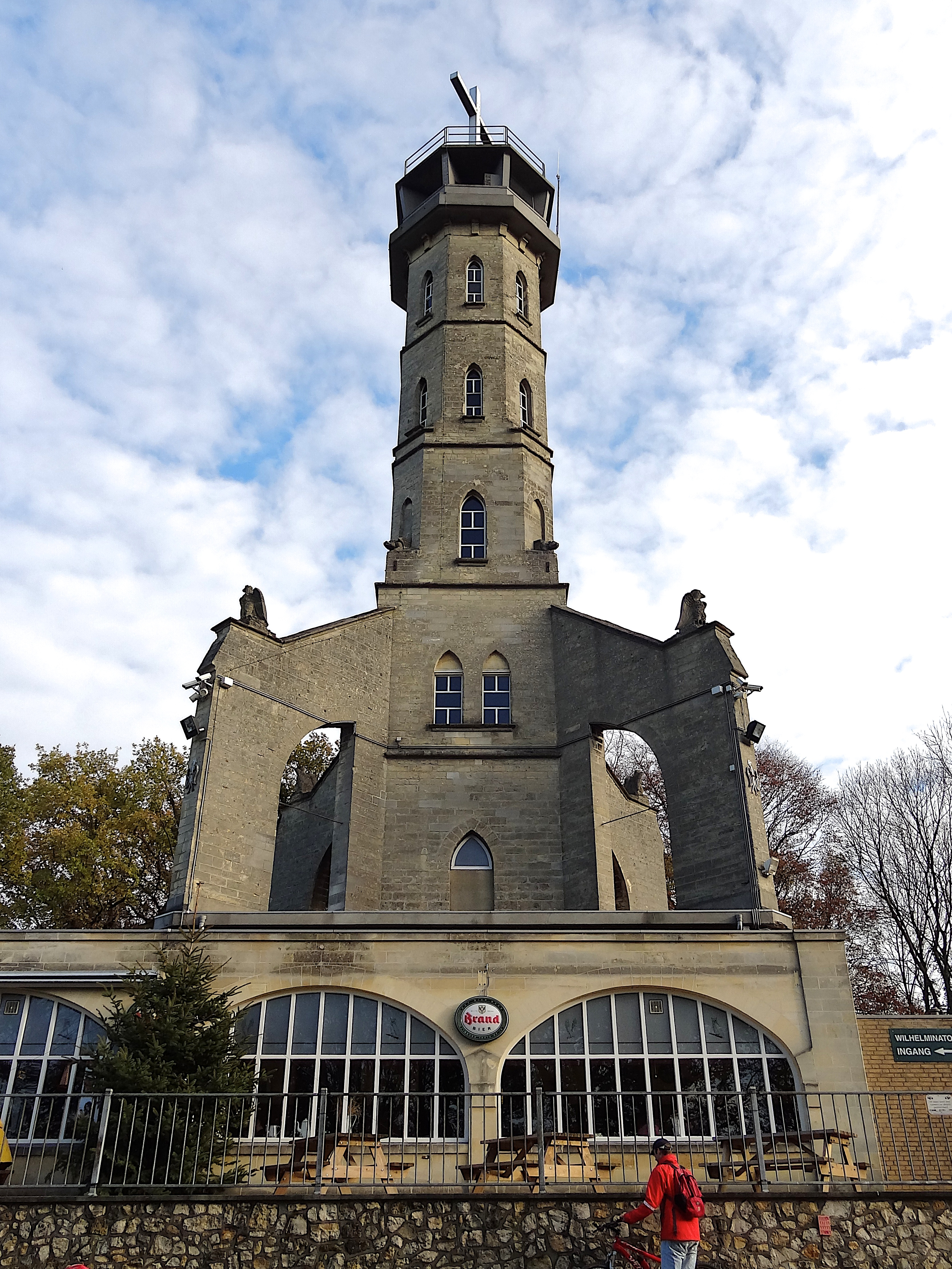
- Interactive map of the Wilhelminatoren area

General information
- Architectural style: Historicism with neo-Gothic elements
- Location: Valkenburg, Netherlands
- Coordinates: 50°51′30″N 5°49′54″E
- Completed: 1906
- Destroyed: 16 March 2025

Design and construction
- Architect: Christiaan Alfons Prevoo

The Wilhelminatoren was a lookout tower in the Dutch town of Valkenburg aan de Geul. The thirty-meter-high Rijksmonument, designed by Christiaan Alfons Prevoo and constructed in 1906, stood on the Heunsberg and offered a wide vantage point over the South Limburg Heuvelland. In the early morning of 16 March 2025, the tower suddenly collapsed.

This was a different tower from the Wilhelminatoren with the same name only 20 kilometers further away at the Vaalserberg in Vaals.

== History ==
The construction of the tower was initiated by the Kurcomité Falcobergia, an association founded in 1895 competing with the Valkenburg Vereniging voor Vreemdelingenverkeer Het Geuldal, founded ten years earlier. Both associations aimed to promote the emerging tourism in Valkenburg, although private interests also played a role. In 1898, Het Geuldal had already constructed a wooden lookout tower in the Rotspark on the Cauberg. The tower was demolished in 1910. The Wilhelminatoren was built in 1906 on the Heunsberg opposite to the Rotspark, at that time on the territory of the municipality of Oud-Valkenburg. The partly neo-Gothic building constructed of Limburg marl was designed by local architect Christiaan Alfons Prevoo on behalf of the Kurcomité Falcobergia.

In 1922, the Wilhelminatoren became the property of the Schetters-Bours family for an amount of 18,000 guilders, who would run a café-restaurant there for three generations. Water supply, electric lighting and telephone were installed and a wooden roof was placed on top of the tower, so that people could climb the tower even in poor weather. However, this roof blew off the tower several times. In 1930, on the initiative of pastor Ad Welters, an eight-metre high light cross made of concrete with neon tubes was placed on top of the tower.

During World War II, the cross had to stay extinguished by order of the German occupiers. In September 1944, the structure was damaged by a grenade. In 1947, the tower was restored. A year later, in the summer of 1948, lightning struck the cross during a storm. The neon lighting could not be restored until 1950, and continued to malfunction. From 1954, the Wilhelminatoren could be reached by cable car from the Neerhem in the centre of Valkenburg.

In 1968, the concrete cross, which had been extinguished since 1960, was removed. On the initiative of Martin Eurlings, among others, a campaign was started in 1969 to pay for a new cross. The new, aluminium cross was placed on 11 February 1972. In 1989, another major restoration of the entire building took place. From 1997, the Geenen family was responsible for the operation of the café-restaurant, the cable car, the later added toboggan run, and the Wilhelminagroeve, which was rented out for paintball and laser tag.

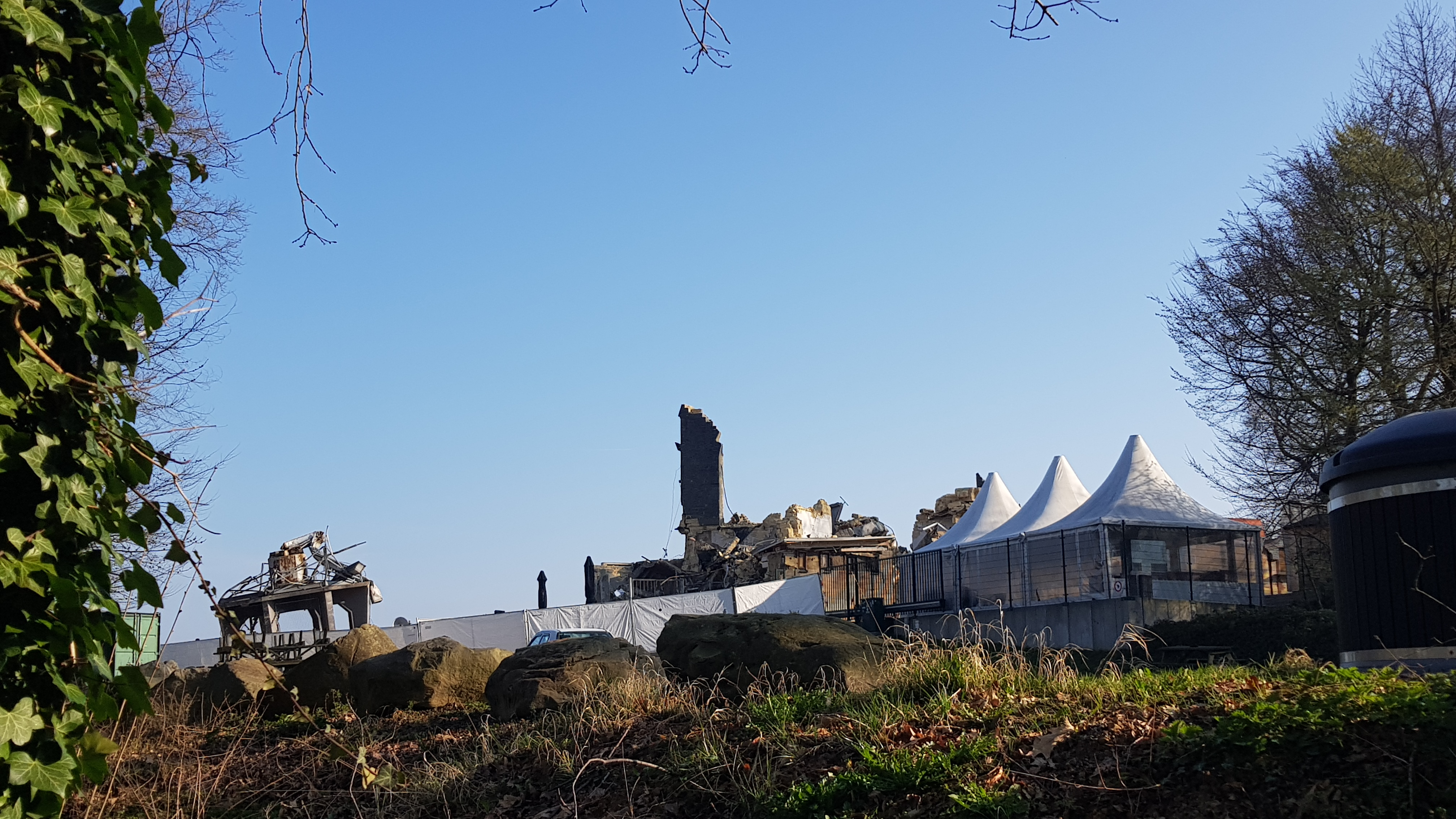
The ruins of the tower after she collapsed in March 2025

The tower could also be reached via a footpath. From Sibbe, it could be reached by motorized transport via the Heunsbergerweg.

In the early morning of 16 March 2025, the Wilhelminatoren collapsed unexpectedly. The tower was closed for maintenance at the time. The Royal Netherlands Meteorological Institute seismometer at the Valkenburg measuring station registered a signal at 5:31 a.m. local time that may have been related to the collapse.

== Description ==
=== Architecture ===
The Wilhelminatoren had a rectangular floor plan and had seven floors. The rocket-shaped tower was built of marlstone and had four buttresses crowned with sculpted stone falcons. The tower had pointed arch-shaped steel windows and was decorated with drip mouldings, decorative wrought iron wall anchors, and gargoyles. The tower was covered with an eight-sided tent roof crowned with a large aluminium cross, which was illuminated in the evening and at night and could be seen from far away. The attic was dated to the 1930s, and was made of concrete. Around the first floor there was a catering business and a wrought iron fence.

=== Vantage point ===
The remains of the Wilhelminatoren lie on the Heunsberg, which lies at an altitude of 145 metres above Amsterdam Ordnance Datum. The tower could be climbed and offered a wide view over the Geuldal and part of the Limburg Hills. In clear weather, it was possible to see the German city of Aachen and the Belgian city of Liège from the tower.
