= Tamás Wachsler =

Hungarian politician (1965–2025)

Támas Wachsler

Member of the National Assembly of Hungary for Borsod–Abaúj–Zemplén County
- In office 2 May 1990 – 17 June 1998

Personal details
- Born: 10 November 1965 Miskolc, Hungary
- Died: March 2025 (aged 59)
- Political party: Fidesz
- Education: Technical University of Budapest
- Occupation: Architect, politician

Tamás Wachsler (10 November 1965 – 26 March 2025) was a Hungarian architect and politician who, as a member of Fidesz, served in the National Assembly from 1990 to 1998.

Wachsler died in March 2025, at the age of 59.
