= Naoshima New Museum of Art =

Art museum in Naoshima, Japan

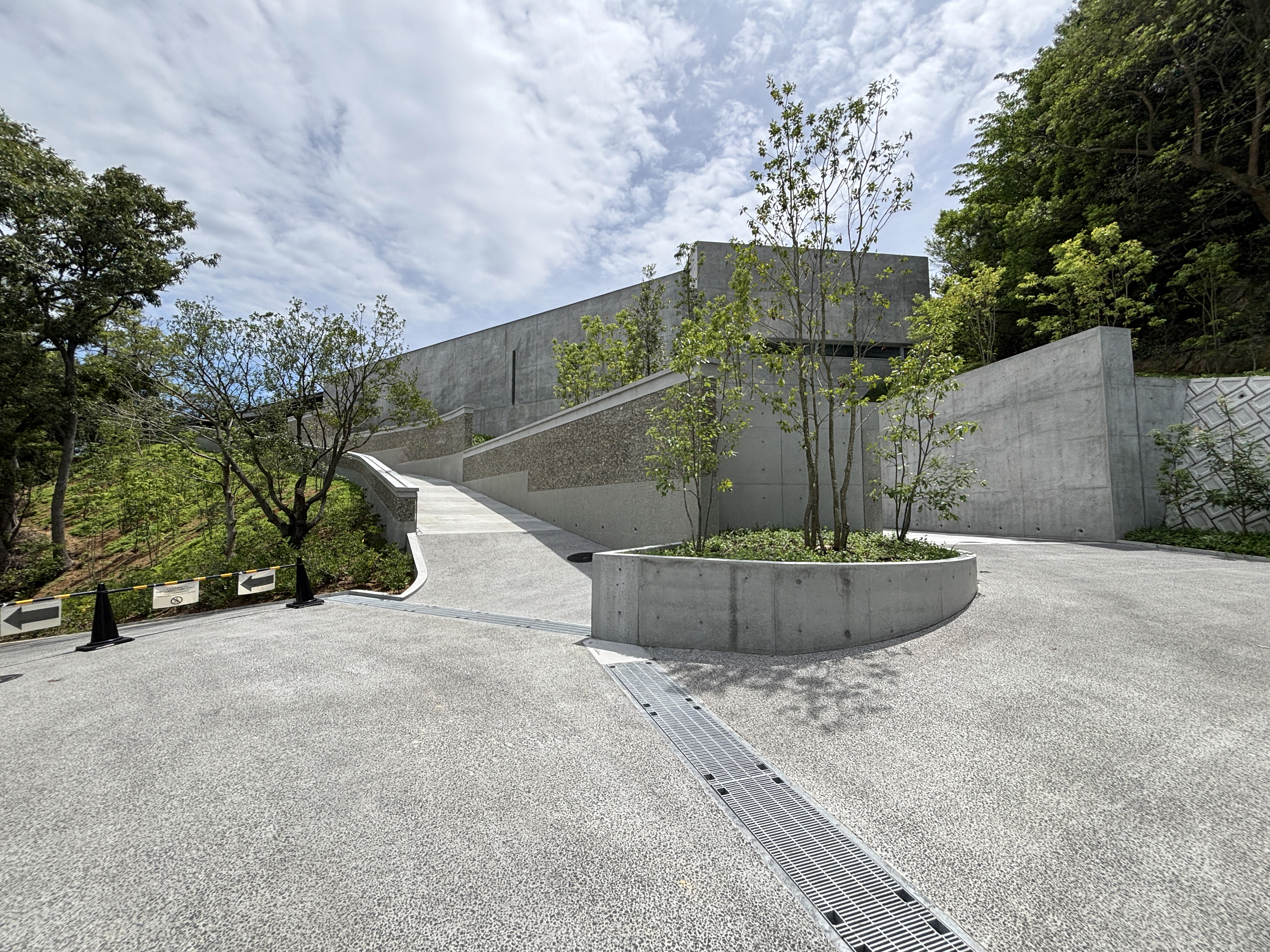
Exterior of the museum

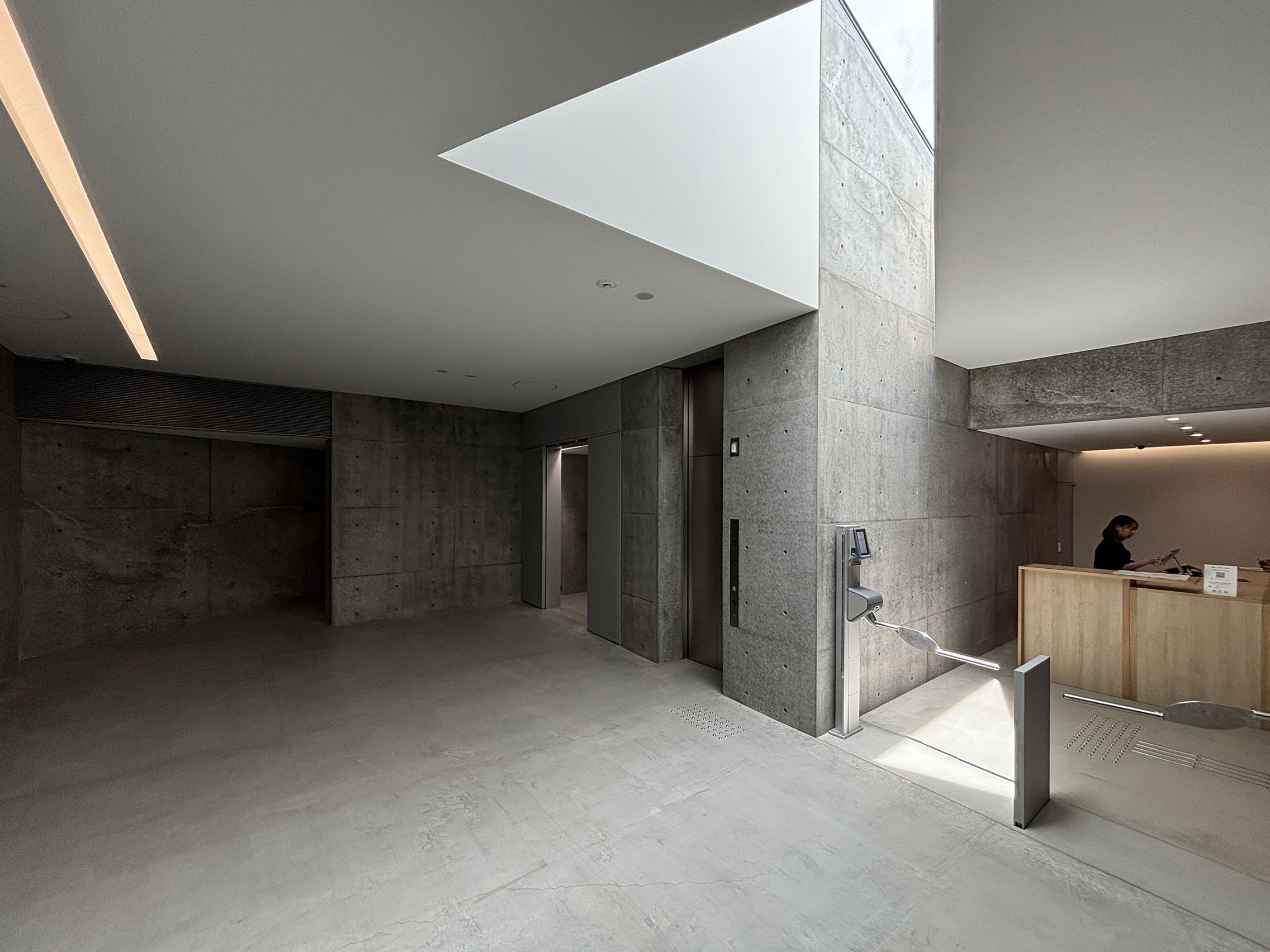
Reception

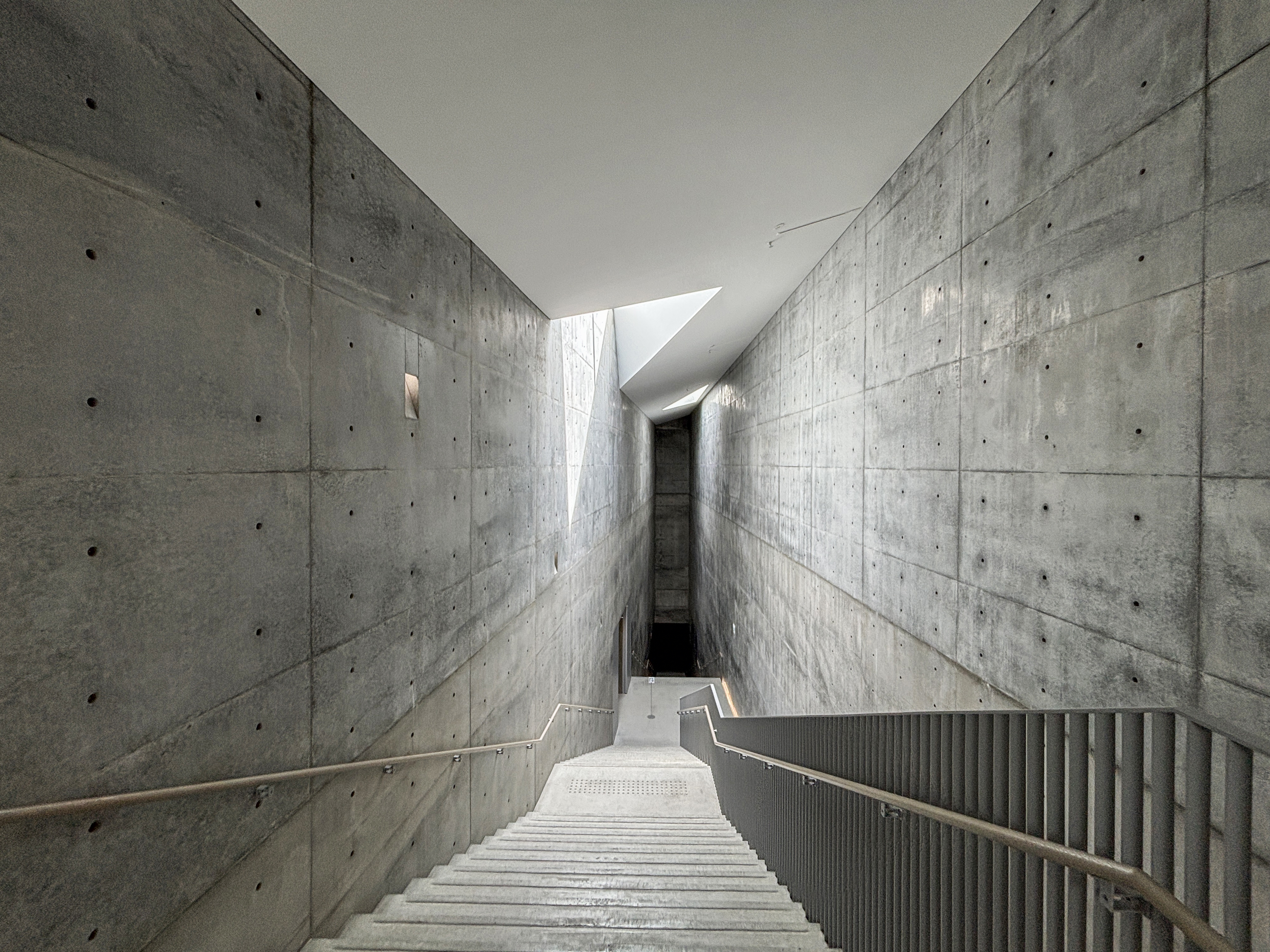
Stairs in the museum

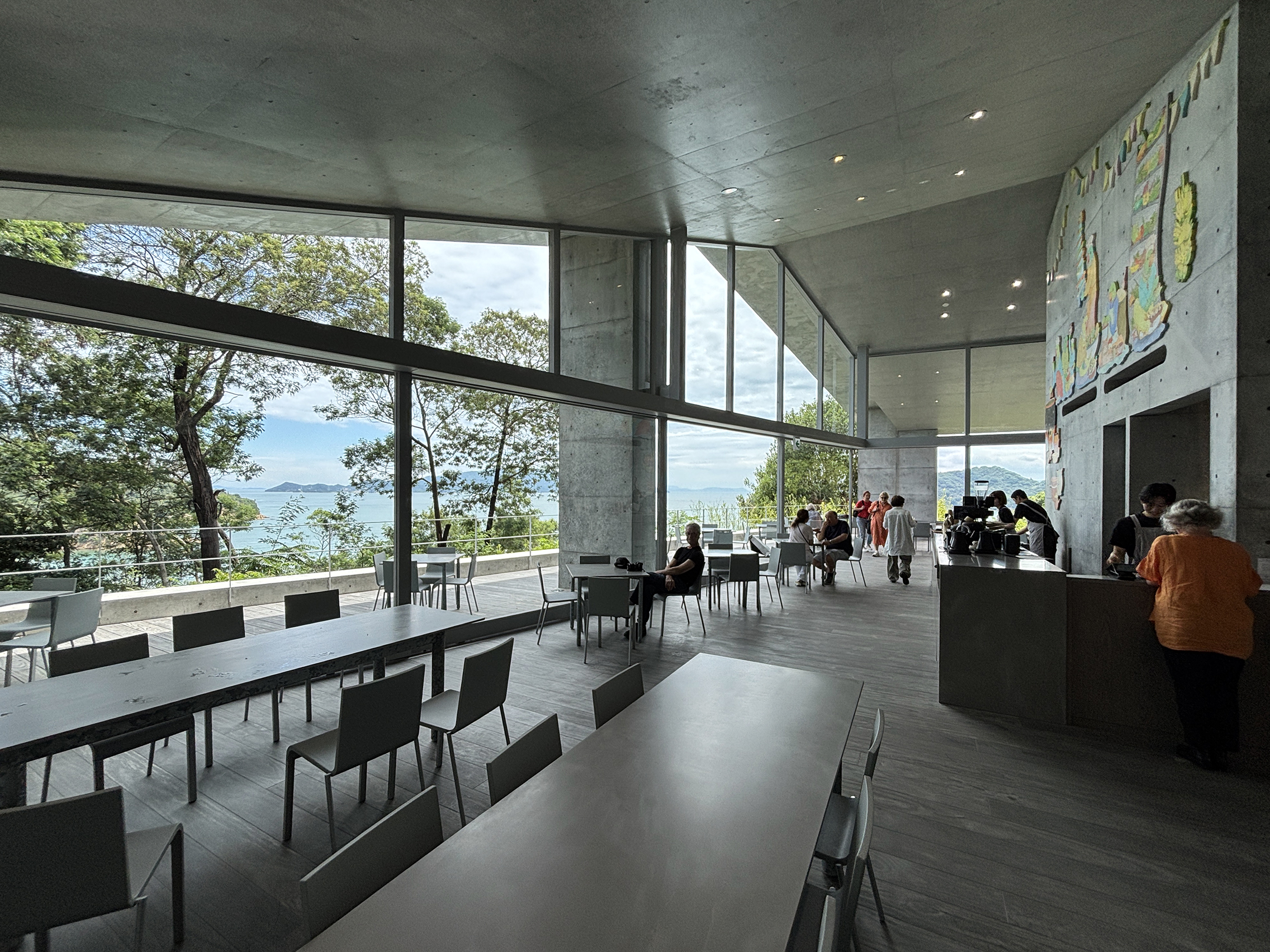
Cafe

The Naoshima New Museum of Art (Japanese: 直島新美術館) is an art museum located on the island of Naoshima in Japan. It opened on May 31 2025. The museum is part of the Benesse Art Site Naoshima, alongside other Naoshima institutions operated by Benesse, such as the Chichu Art Museum.

The museum is situated on a hilltop near Honmura district in Naoshima. It accommodates four gallery spaces focused on contemporary art from Japan and other countries in Asia. The inaugural exhibition will display works by eleven artists and groups, including figures like Takashi Murakami and Cai Guo-Qiang.

== Design ==
The facility was designed by Japanese architect Tadao Ando, and marks Ando's tenth project for the Benesse Art Site Naoshima. It consists of a three-story building with two basement levels and a ground floor. The large roof is meant to evoke mountain ridge lines connecting to form the top covering. A cafe on the north side of the ground floor allows visitors to view the Seto Inland Sea from the terrace. The building spans 34,000 square feet (3159m^{2}).
