= List of flags of the Netherlands =

This is a list of flags used in the Kingdom of the Netherlands. For more information about the national flag, visit the article Flag of the Netherlands.

== National flag ==
Flag	Date	Use	Description
	1813–1815	Flag of the Sovereign Principality of the United Netherlands	Main article: Flag of the Netherlands A horizontal tricolour of red, white, and blue.
	1815–1839	Flag of the United Kingdom of the Netherlands	Main article: Flag of the Netherlands A horizontal tricolour of red, white, and blue.
	1839–present	Flag of the Kingdom of the Netherlands.	Main article: Flag of the Netherlands A horizontal tricolour of red, white, and blue.
	?–present	Hanging pennon	Hanging variant of the national flag
	?–present	Orange pennon	Orange is the colour of the royal family

== Constituent countries ==
Flag	Date	Use	Description
	1839–present	Flag of the Netherlands	A horizontal tricolour of red, white, and blue.
	1976–present	Flag of Aruba	A medium blue field with a white fimbriated (bordered) red four-pointed star in its upper hoist corner and two narrow horizontal yellow stripes in its lower half.
	1984–present	Flag of Curaçao	A blue field with a horizontal yellow stripe slightly below the midline and two white five-pointed stars in the canton.
	1985–present	Flag of Sint Maarten	A white triangle situated at the hoist charged with the constituent country's coat of arms, along with two horizontal bands of red and blue.

== Provinces ==
Flag	Date	Use	Description
	1947–present	Flag of Drenthe	A white flag with two horizontal red stripes. Between the two stripes there is a black tower and six red stars.
	1986–present	Flag of Flevoland	A flag with three stripes: blue, a thinner yellow one which is wavy on the hoist side, and green, with a white fleur-de-lis placed in the canton.
	1957–present	Flag of Friesland	A flag consists of four blue and three white diagonal stripes; the white stripes filling with a total of seven red pompeblêden.
	1953–present	Flag of Gelderland	A horizontal tricolour flag in blue, yellow (gold), and black.
	1950–present	Flag of Groningen	A flag with a green cross fimbriated in white, and red in the first and fourth quarter, blue in the second and third quarter.
	1953–present	Flag of Limburg	A horizontal tricolour flag in white, blue, and yellow (proportion 2:1:2) and a red lion rampant towards hoist side.
	1959–present	Flag of North Brabant	A chequy pattern alternatively in red and white.
	1958–present	Flag of North Holland	A horizontal tricolour flag in yellow, red, and blue.
	1948–present	Flag of Overijssel	A yellow flag with two red bands in top and bottom, and a blue wavy band in the middle.
	1985–present	Flag of South Holland	A yellow flag with a red lion rampant towards hoist side.
	1952–present	Flag of Utrecht	A horizontal bicolour flag in white and red, with Saint George's Cross in the canton.
	1949–present	Flag of Zeeland	A flag with wavy bands in blue and white with the coat of arms of Zeeland in the centre.

== Public bodies ==
Flag	Date	Use	Description
	1981–present	Flag of Bonaire	A large blue triangle from the bottom corners to the upper fly and a smaller yellow triangle at the upper hoist, separated by a white strip containing a black compass and a red six-pointed star.
	1985–present	Flag of Saba	Two equal red triangles at the top and two equal blue triangles at the bottom, with a white diamond with yellow star in the middle.
	2004–present	Flag of Sint Eustatius	Divided in four five-sided blue polygons, each fimbriated red. In its centre is a diamond-form white field. In the diamond is the silhouette of the island in green, and above the island is a five-pointed golden/yellow star.

== Municipalities ==
Flag	Date	Use	Description
	1959–present	Flag of Amersfoort, a city in the province of Utrecht situated at the eastern edge of the Randstad.	Three horizontal stripes in white and red, with two red blocks placed below and above a Saint George's cross on the hoist side
	1975–present	Flag of the national capital, Amsterdam	Coat of arms of Amsterdam presented horizontally on field
	?–present	Flag of Arnhem, the capital city of the largest province, Gelderland	A bi-colour field with white in the top and blue in the bottom, and a counterchanged double-headed eagle towards hoist side
	1959–present	Flag of Assen, the capital of the province of Drenthe	A bi-colour flag with blue in the top and white in the bottom
	1996–present	Flag of Delft, home of the Delft University of Technology and Johannes Vermeer	Coat of arms of Delft presented horizontally on field. A triband of white, black, and white.
	1927–present	Flag of Eindhoven, the largest city of the province of North Brabant	A flag with two vertical stripes in red and white in the hoist side and five horizontal strips alternatively in red and white
	2023–present	Flag of Enschede, the largest city of the Twente region and the province of Overijssel	A white field with a red stripe with a battle fence
	1879–present	Flag of the city of Groningen, the capital of the province of Groningen	A white field with a green stripe
	?–present	Flag of Haarlem, the capital of the province of North Holland	A red field with the coat of arms of Haarlem towards hoist side
	1966–present	Flag of Heerlen, a city in the south of the province of Limburg	A blue field with a golden eagle in the middle
	1999–present	Flag of 's-Hertogenbosch, the capital of the province of North Brabant	A flag with five stripes alternatively in red and white and a black square with a yellow tree in the canton
	1958–present	Flag of Hilversum, the largest city of the Gooi area	Coat of arms of Hilversum in banner form
	2019–present	Flag of Leeuwarden, the capital of the province of Friesland	A blue flag with a yellow lion rampant in the middle and two vertical stripes alternatively in red and white in the hoist side
	1949–present	Flag of Leiden, a city in South Holland with the oldest Dutch university, Leiden University, and birthplace of Rembrandt	A red field with a white stripe in the middle, with a white disc towards hoist with red border and two crossed red keys
	1981–present	Flag of Lelystad, the capital of the province of Flevoland	A yellow field with a blue hexagon filling with a white fleur-de-lis towards hoist and surrounding by the bases of four Ls forming a box.
	1545–1549, 1647–? (1938), 1994–present	Flag of Maastricht, the capital of the province of Limburg	A white five-pointed star in the red field, towards hoist
	1974–present	Flag of Middelburg, the capital of the province of Zeeland	Coat of arms of Middelburg in banner form
	1949–present	Flag of Rotterdam, the second city of the Netherlands	A white stripe in the green field
	1984–present	Flag of Scheveningen, a seaside resort and a district of The Hague	In azure with three right swimming herrings of silver, each herring with a three-leaved yellow crown, floating above the head.
	1456–present	Flag of Sneek, the second city of the province of Friesland	A flag with hoist half in black and fly half in yellow
	1949–present	Flag of The Hague, the capital of the province of South Holland	A flag with yellow at the top and green at the bottom
	1990–present	Flag of the city of Utrecht, the capital of the province of Utrecht	A bi-colour flag in white and red field and partly per bend
	1980–present	Flag of Weert, a town in the centre of the province of Limburg	A white field with a blue horizontal stripe in the middle and a yellow vertical stripe in the hoist side surmounted with three red horns
	1962–present	Flag of Zwolle, the capital of the province of Overijssel	A blue field with a white cross

== Regions ==
Flag	Adopted	Use	Description
	2018	Flag of the Achterhoek	Winner of a design competition. The flag is now well known in the Achterhoek and can be seen flying here and there. The flag shows a creamy white diagonally curved cross surrounded by a dark green border. This cross depicts the winding roads of the Achterhoek and the rows of trees along them. Because of the cross, the flag is divided into four and consists of two light green areas and two dark green areas in the background. Light green represents the meadows and dark green represents the Achterhoek forests. The flag design is inspired by the Achterhoek coulisse landscape. This is a semi-open landscape that has the character of a stage with wings due to the planting and buildings. Scenes are the parts of the stage where players come from and return.
	2022	Flag of the Batavia	Winner of a design competition. The flag has a green background with three narrow vertical stripes in red and blue on the mast side. These stripes are derived from the coat of arms of the noble family de Cocq van Haeften. They played an important role in the region during the Middle Ages. This coat of arms was also often used as inspiration for arms of various (disbanded) villages and towns in the Batavia. The stripes symbolise all these places. The green background refers to the region's landscape: lots of woods, heathland and other nature. Placed on top are two wavy blue horizontal stripes referring to the rivers Waal and Rhine. Central to the flag are three silhouettes of apples. These refer to the three Batavia regions that make up the area: the Tielerwaard, Lower Batavia and Upper Batavia.
	20 December 1961	Flag of Beemster	Similar to the flag of Terschelling, it is made up of four stripes in the colours red, green, yellow, and blue. These colours are based on the municipal coat of arms. The red colour symbolises the sun, the green colour the land, the yellow colour the grain and the blue colour the water. All these symbols are included in the municipal coat of arms except the grain.
	29 June 1955	Flag of het Bildt	A background of three horizontal stripes in green, white and blue. The flag's tripartite division refers to the original division of het Bildt into three parishes. Green, white, and blue are taken from the corresponding municipal coat of arms. White in the flag refers to the former Middelzee between Aldlân (blue) and Nijlân. The mast side of the flag shows a triangle, which is also divided into three. This triangle indicates the geographical shape of the reclaimed polders. Red and yellow refer to the county of Holland. This is because the Dutch played a major role in the embankment.
	12th century	Flag of Brabant	The flag is black and features the Brabantian lion. This is a standing yellow (or golden) lion with red tongue and nails. The flag was also conducted in square form.
	23 February 2016	Flag of Drechtsteden	Devised by a Dordrecht visual artist, the design was only presented but never officially put into use. The flag basically consists of three horizontal stripes in red and white. This makes the flag quite similar to the flag of Dordrecht. This was also an immediate criticism of the flag. It was said to be too similar to the flag of Dordrecht and lacked characteristics of other place flags from the region. The red stripes feature a diagonal white stripe. White can be interpreted in the flag as iconic rivers that cross the region. Red can then represent buildings around these rivers.
	Unknown	Flag of Eastergoa	The flag design consists of five horizontal stripes in the colours red and white. It is not known exactly since when the Eastergoa flag has been in use. However, it is known that the flag is based on its coat of arms. Where exactly these colours come from is not clear.
	23 September 2006	Flag of Frisia	The flag is yellow and features a white Nordic cross with a blue border. This divides the flag into quarters, so to speak. Each quarter features a red seeblatt (pompeblêd), a well-known heart-shaped Frisian symbol representing the leaf of a water lily. The design of the Interfrisian flag was the work of the activist group Groep fan Auwerk. They promote a stronger Frisian identity and are in favour of an independent Frisian state.
	15 July 1963	Flag of Gaasterland	The flag consists of three horizontal stripes in blue, yellow, and green. The middle yellow stripe is thicker and contains a leaping red hare. Together with the flag colours, this hare is taken from the municipal coat of arms. In it, it jumps over a green meadow with corn behind it and a blue sky. The hare's provenance is unfortunately unknown.
	13 February 2020	Flag of the Land of Meuse and Waal	The flag has been in use in its current form since 2020 and was created following a design competition. In this, this design was chosen from three designs, with 752 votes. The flag shows three horizontal stripes in white, blue and green. At the centre of the design is a yellow coat of arms in the middle in which two wavy rivers forming the letters M and W. The two designs that fell off also contained the letters of Meuse and Waal but were a lot tighter in design. The flag was designed by Wim Hendriks.
	2021	Flag of the Liemers	The flag has been in use in its current form since 2021 and was created following a design competition. In this, this design was chosen from some 100 entries, with a 37% victory. The flag looks modern, is dark red and shows a red twisted Y-shape with white outline. This Y-shape is based on the region's borders and its connection to the IJssel and Rhine rivers. It is, as it were, a simplified form of this geographical entity. The red colour has several meanings. For instance, it stands for the indication of 'standing out' which is often attributed to this bright colour. It also stands for enthusiasm, strength, love, passion and warmth. The flag is slightly similar to the regional flag of Achterhoek. The white lines and curved shape are reminiscent of it.
	14 October 1987	Flag of Northern Limburg	The flag basically consists of two white stripes and a narrower blue stripe. The blue stripe is split by a green shape that resembles both the uppercase letter G and the lowercase letter E. Exactly how the flag was created is unclear.
	Before 1900	Flag of the Ommelanden	The flag is very similar to the flag of the province of Friesland but shows red heart shapes instead of seeblatts (or pompeblêden). Both flags are regularly mixed up and are so similar because of the common past of Ommelanden and Friesland. However, the flag of Ommelanden is older; its design is directly derived from the corresponding coat of arms, which dates back to the 16th century. The background of the flag consists of seven diagonal stripes in white and blue. Eleven red hearts are distributed across the white stripes. These hearts are also called 'water rose plums'. What these refer to is not exactly known. The flag is believed to have been used before 1900.
	25 June 1991	Flag of Rheiderland	The flag can be seen as the regional flag of the Groningen region of Rheiderland. It has been adopted on 25 June 1991 in its current form, and at that time served as the municipal flag of the former municipality of Rheiderland. Nowadays, Rheiderland falls under the municipality of Oldambt and it became the regional flag of the same name. The flag consists of a yellow and blue field separated by a embattled line. The flag colours are taken from the corresponding coat of arms. The battlements indicate the presence of several fortresses (including Bad Nieuweschans) in historic Rheiderland. The blue colour predominates, as this is also the case in the municipal coat of arms.
	September 2021	Flag of Salland	The flag was designed by Mr Dijk after holding a design competition. The winning design was officially adopted in September 2021. Previously, Salland used a different flag. The flag has a modern design and consists of five colours: light blue, green, yellow, dark blue and white. The light blue stripe at the top represents the sky, while the yellow and green at the bottom symbolise the fields and meadows. The green triangular area at the top right represents the Sallandse Heuvelrug National Park. The colour areas are separated from each other by white lines. The horizontal white line represents the horizon. To the right of the flag is a vertical wavy blue stripe representing both the letter S of Salland and the rivers that cross Salland.
	Unknown	Flag of Sânwâlden	The flag consists of fifteen equal blocks in white and green. Together they form a chequered pattern. Officially, the flag is slightly wider, and the blocks have a square shape. The green blocks are a reference to the seven trees shown on the coat of arms of Sânwâlden. White has been used as the background colour of the coat of arms in this regard.
	30 May 2000	Flag of Schermer	The flag can be seen as the regional flag of the North Holland region of Schermer. It has been adopted on 30 May 2000 in its current form, and at the time served as the municipal flag of the former municipality of Schermer. Today, Schermer falls under the municipality of Alkmaar and it became the regional flag of the same name. The flag basically consists of a blue and green area separated by a yellow chevron (arrow-shaped element). The flag colours come from the flag of the former water board De Schermeer. The sails and the pike are taken from the municipal coat of arms. The sales represent the polder mill depicted on it. This mill symbolises the village of Schermerhorn, which still has several of these mills. The pike was eventually derived from the coat of arms of Zuid- en Noord-Schermer. This is a former municipality which carried two pikes on its coat of arms.
	2009	Flag of Stellingwarfs	The design was specially conceived to celebrate the 700th anniversary of this area. The flag is white with a horizontal red stripe at the bottom and top. At the bottom, however, the stripe is interrupted with the text 'Stellingwarf' in italics. In the centre of the flag are two silhouettes of a griffin. These mythical creatures represent the two municipalities of Ooststellingwerf and Weststellingwerf and are also derived from respective municipal flags. Ooststellingwerf and Weststellingwerf are the municipalities whereby far the most Stellingwarfs live. Red and white are the traditional colours there.
	1981	Flag of Twente	The flag is red and shows a white prancing horse in the centre. This represents the so-called Saxon Steed (or Twentse Ros). Most likely, this horse originated from the Saxons, who considered it a noble animal. The Saxons owned Twente for a long time as part of their Saxon Empire. The story also goes that the horse represents the divine horse Sleipnir. This eight-legged hoofed animal originates from Norse mythology and was considered the fastest horse in existence. Today, the symbol of Twente can be found in many logos and other expressions.
	2012	Flag of the Veluwe	The flag is yellow and never officially recognised. A blue horizontal stripe is included at the top and bottom. At the centre of the flag is a black silhouette of a leaping (red) deer. This is a common part in the Veluwe forests. The flag elements are all taken from the flags of some municipalities located (partly) in the Veluwe. Yellow, blue and black also form the colours of the provincial flag of Gelderland.
	2008	Flag of West Frisia	The flag was introduced by the mayor of Hoorn. The flag is blue and shows in the foreground two yellow (golden) going lions (or leopards) surrounded by five rectangular squares (peas). Previously, it was not five but seven peas, referring to the seven sea countries. The lions are ancient armorial animals and, in the case of West Friesland, date from the 14th century. The flag design is derived from the historical flag and arms of West Friesland, which are several centuries old.
	Unknown	Flag of Westergoa	The flag design consists of a blue background split by a white diagonal stripe. It is not known exactly when the flag has been in use. However, it is known that the flag is based on its coat of arms. Where exactly these colours come from is not clear.
	3 March 1987	Flag of Westland	The flag consists of five zigzag stripes in white and green. At the top and bottom of the flag, these zigzag bands merge into three green triangles. The zigzag stripes represent the (plant) greenhouses that are common in Westland. Here, green refers to the cultivated plants and white to the greenhouses themselves. The flag of the municipality of Westland also shows some cartel stripes with a similar meaning.
	5 January 2009	Flag of Zeelandic Flanders	The flag shows a yellow wavy stripe in the middle, which divides the flag in two. Together with the black climbing lion placed inside it, it refers to the flags of Flanders and Hulst. The lion was slightly modernised for the flag design so that it looks more like a young, dynamic lion. At the top, the flag shows three horizontal stripes in red and white. These are taken from the municipal flag of Sluis. At the bottom are three horizontal stripes in blue and white. These are taken from the municipal flag of Terneuzen. They refer to the North Sea, the Zwin and the Western Scheldt.

== Royal family ==
=== Royal standard ===
Flag	Date	Use	Description
	2013–present	Royal flag (Dutch: koninklijke vlag), or the royal standard, of the kingdom's monarch	A square orange flag, divided in four quarters by a nassau-blue cross with the small coat of arms of the Kingdom, surmounted by a royal crown and surrounded by the insignia of the Grand Cross of the Order of William. Each quarter shows a bugle-horn, which originates in arms of the Principality of Orange.

=== Other members of the royal family ===
Flag	Date	Use	Description
	1985–present	Princes of the Netherlands (Sons of Beatrix); Constantijn and formerly Johan-Friso	A 5:6 rectangular flag with the Royal standard colours and their parental arms (a white tower) in the lower hoist as difference.
	1988–present	Princes of the Netherlands (Sons of Margriet); Maurits, Bernhard, Pieter-Christiaan and Floris	A 5:6 rectangular flag with the Royal standard colours and their parental arms (a white six-pointed star) in the lower hoist as difference.
	1960–present	Princesses of the Netherlands (Daughters of Juliana); Beatrix, Irene, Margriet and Christina	A swallow tailed flag, with the Royal standard colours and their parental arms (a heraldic rose) in the lower hoist as difference.
	2021–present	Princesses of the Netherlands (Daughters of Willem-Alexander); Catharina-Amalia, Alexia and Ariane	A swallow tailed flag, with the Royal standard colours and their maternal arms (the tower of Zorreguieta) in the lower hoist as difference.
	2002–present	Máxima of Orange-Nassau	As queen, Máxima uses a swallow tailed standard, with the colours of her husband's flag changed and her parental arms (a yellow tower) in the lower hoist.
	2003–present	Laurentien of Orange-Nassau	As princess, Laurentien uses a swallow-tailed standard, with the colours of her husband's flag counterchanged and her parental arms (a yellow heraldic lozenge) in the lower hoist.

== Governmental flags ==
Flag	Date	Use	Description
	2011–present	Flag of the government of the Netherlands	Light blue field with a white one-third width post next to the post and containing at the top the emblem of the Dutch Government and its agencies.
	1986–present	Flag of the governor of Aruba	A white flag with the flag of the Netherlands striped across both the top and the bottom, and a badge of the flag of Aruba in the centre.
	2010–present	Flag of the governor of Curaçao	A white flag with the flag of the Netherlands striped across both the top and the bottom, and a badge of the flag of Curaçao in the centre.
	2010–present	Flag of the governor of Sint Maarten	A white flag with the flag of the Netherlands striped across both the top and the bottom, and a badge of Sint Maarten in the centre.

== Military and naval flags ==
Flag	Date	Use	Description
	1974–present	Flag of a minister, except the Minister of Defence	Seven horizontal bands in the colour combination red-white-blue-white-red-white-blue in the ratio 1:1:1:6:1:1:1 with a crowned lion with a sword and a bundle of arrows in the middle.
	2023–present	Flag of the Minister of Defence	Seven horizontal bands in the colour combination red-white-blue-white-red-white-blue in the ratio 1:1:1:6:1:1:1 with two crossed yellow swords topped by a yellow crown.
	1957–present	Flag of the Secretary of Defence	Seven equally high horizontal bands in the colour combination red-white-blue-white-red-white-blue.
	2005–present	Flag of the Chief of Defence of the Netherlands Armed Forces	Seven equally high horizontal bands in the colour combination red-white-blue-white-red-white-blue. In the middle, a green circle with three swords representing the armed forces, except for the Royal Marechaussee.
	1982–present	Flag of the Inspector General of the Netherlands Armed Forces	Seven equally high horizontal bands in the colour combination red-white-blue-white-red-white-blue. In the middle, the coat of arms of the Inspector General of the Armed Forces.
	1937–present	Flag of the Royal Netherlands Navy	A horizontal tricolour of red, white and blue.
	2011–present	Governmental flag of the Royal Netherlands Navy	Blue field with a white one-third width post next to the post and containing at the top the emblem of the Royal Netherlands Navy in orange.
	?–present	Flag of the Royal Netherlands Army	Blue flag, loaded in the middle with the coat of arms of the Royal Netherlands Army.
	2011–present	Governmental flag of the Royal Netherlands Army	Green field with a white one-third width post next to the post and containing at the top the emblem of the Royal Netherlands Army in orange.
	1948–present	Flag of the Royal Netherlands Air Force	Blue flag, divided in three by an orange point coming from the breech side. Originally loaded with the decorations of the Military William Order, but since 1965 with the logo of the Royal Netherlands Air Force.
	2011–present	Governmental flag of the Royal Netherlands Air Force	Navy blue field with a white one-third width post next to the post and containing at the top the emblem of the Royal Netherlands Air Force in orange.
	?–present	Flag of the Royal Marechaussee	Nassau blue flag, loaded in the centre with the Marechaussee grenade with closed flame in white.
	2011–present	Governmental flag of the Royal Marechaussee	Navy blue field with a white one-third width post next to the post and containing at the top the emblem of the Royal Marechaussee in orange.
	2002–present	Flag of the Netherlands Coast Guard	Three stripes, the heights of which are in proportion as 54:10:13, with the colours orange, white and blue. The emblem of the Netherlands Coast Guard is depicted on the orange stripe, near the breeches.
	before 1933–present	Flag of the officer of the Royal Netherlands Navy Reserve	The Dutch flag, of which the centre of the white band is semi-circularly widened to halfway between the red and the blue band, on which broadening with black thread is embroidered an unready anchor, covered by a crown.
	?–present	The "Geusje", the civil jack of the Netherlands (unofficial; most common variant)	Eight segments in the colours of the Dutch flag.
	1931–present	The "Geus", the naval jack of the Netherlands	Twelve segments in the colours of the kingdom flag; in the ratio 2:3.
	?–present	Naval jack of the Royal Marechaussee	Triangular flag, the mast side of which has the white colour and the tip is nassau blue. The white area is loaded with an orange Dutch lion, the blue area with the logo of the Marechaussee (the grenade with closed flame).
	1934–present	Commissioning pennant	A long, very narrow, split ship's vane in the colours of the kingdom flag.

== Historical ==
=== National flags ===
Flag	Date	Use	Description
	800–888	Imperial Oriflamme of Charlemagne	A three-tailed green field with eight golden crosses and six flowers.
	959–1190	Flag of the Lower Lotharingia	A red field with a white stripe in the middle
	1024–1528	Flag of the Prince-Bishopric of Utrecht	A red field with a white cross
	1183–1430	Flag of the Duchy of Brabant	A golden lion on a black field.
	1384–1482	Flag of the Burgundian Netherlands	A white flag with the cross of Burgundy, firesteel, and Golden Fleece
	1482–1556	Flag of Habsburg Netherlands	A white flag with the Cross of Burgundy.
	1556–1648	Flag of Spanish Netherlands	A white flag with the Cross of Burgundy.
	1556–1648	Civil ensign of the Spanish Netherlands	A horizontal tricolour of red, white and yellow, with the Cross of Burgundy in the centre.
	1572–1795	The Prince's Flag	A horizontal tricolour of orange, white, and blue.
	1652–1806	The States Flag	A horizontal tricolour of red, white, and blue. The blue is a lighter shade than that of the current national flag
	1796–1806	The Batavian flag	A horizontal tricolour of red, white, and blue with the Republic’s emblem in the canton.
	1806–1810	Flag of the Kingdom of Holland	A horizontal tricolour of red, white, and blue.
	1813–1815	Flag of the Sovereign Principality of the United Netherlands	A horizontal tricolour of red, white, and blue.
	1815–1839	Flag of the United Kingdom of the Netherlands	A horizontal tricolour of red, white, and blue.
	1839–present	Flag of the Kingdom of the Netherlands	A horizontal tricolour of red, white, and blue.

=== Colonies and overseas territories ===
Flag	Date	Use	Description
	1637?–1644?	Flag of Dutch Brazil	Horizontal stripes in red, white, and blue, with a crown and a gold monogram in the centre
	1815–1959	Proposed flag of Dutch Guyana (Suriname)	Horizontal stripes in red, white, and blue, with a coat of arms in the centre
	1959–1975	Flag of Dutch Guyana (Suriname)	A white flag with white, black, brown, red, and yellow five-pointed stars, connected by a black ellipse
	1961–1962	Flag of Netherlands New Guinea	Thirteen blue and white alternating horizontal stripes with a red bar on the hoist side with a white five-pointed star centred on it
	1959–1986	Flag of the Netherlands Antilles	White, with a horizontal blue stripe in the centre, one-third of the flag's hoist, superimposed on a vertical red stripe of the same width, also centred; six white, five-pointed stars are arranged in a hexagon pattern in the centre of the blue band, their points up. The six stars represented the six main islands of Aruba, Bonaire, Curaçao, Saba, Sint Eustatius, and Sint Maarten
	1986–2010	Flag of the Netherlands Antilles after the secession of Aruba	White, with a horizontal blue stripe in the centre, one-third of the flag's hoist, superimposed on a vertical red stripe of the same width, also centred; five white, five-pointed stars are arranged in a pentagon pattern in the centre of the blue band, their points up. The five stars represented the five main islands of Bonaire, Curaçao, Saba, Sint Eustatius, and Sint Maarten.

=== Provinces ===
Flag	Date	Use	Description
	1948–1986	Flag of South Holland	A yellow flag with a red horizontal stripe through the middle

=== Royal standards ===
Flag	Date	Use	Description
	1908–2013	Royal standard of the Monarch	A square orange flag, divided in four quarters by a nassau-blue cross with the small coat of arms of the Kingdom, surmounted by a royal crown and surrounded by the insignia of the Grand Cross of the Order of William. Each quarter shows a bugle-horn, which originates in arms of the Principality of Orange.
	1815–1908	Royal standard of the Monarch	The colours of the flag of the Netherlands with the royal coat of arms (without the mantle).

=== Other members of the Royal Family ===
Flag	Date	Use	Description
	1898–1908	Standard of a Prince	A flag with the colours of the historical Royal standard, with the Royal coat of arms in an orange rectangle at the central band.
	1898–1908	Standard of a Princess	A swallow tailed flag with the colours of the historical Royal standard, with the Royal coat of arms in an orange rectangle at the central band.
	1980–2004	Standard of Juliana of Orange-Nassau	As princess, Juliana used a swallowtailed orange flag, divided in four quarters by a nassau-blue cross. In the centre of the flag is a small arms of the Netherlands without the insignia of the Order of Willem within an orange circle. In the upper hoist her maternal arms (the horn of Orange) and her paternal arms (a black bull with white horns, a red tongue and a golden crown, from the arms of Mecklenburg) in the lower hoist.
	1908–1934	Standard of Emma of Waldeck-Pyrmont	She used a square and swallowtailed orange flag, divided in four quarters by a nassau-blue cross. In the centre of the flag is a small arms of the Netherlands without the insignia of the Order of Willem within an orange circle. Each quarter shows a bugle-horn, which originates in arms of the principality of Orange.
	1898–1908	Standard of Emma of Waldeck-Pyrmont	She used a flag with the colours of the historical Royal standard, with the Royal coat of arms (without the mantle) at the central band.
	1908–1910	Standard of Marie of Orange-Nassau	An oblong flag of orange colour, the height of which is 5/6 of the length, triangularly cut over 1/3 of the length of the flag; divided into four sections by a standing four-armed cross of Nassau blue, the width of 1/5 of the height of the flag; the centre of the cross located at 5/12 of the length of the flag, counted from the pants side; in the centre of the cross a medallion of orange colour, at the diameter of 3/14 of the length of the flag, placed below it the coat of arms, as mentioned in article 1 of this decree, covered by the royal crown; in each of the orange boxes, located on the trouser side of the flag, a horn, as defined in Article 1.
	1980–2002	Standard of the Prince Consort	A quadrangle in Nassau blue bearing an orange cross. First and third quarters, adorned by the Dutch Lion of the coat of arms of the Netherlands. Second and fourth quarters, adorned by the white castle tower from the coat of arms of the House of Amsberg. Centred upon the cross is the coat of arms of the Netherlands, topped by a royal crown.
	1948–1980	Standard of the Prince Consort	A quadrangle bearing an orange cross. First and third quarters in Nassau blue, adorned by the Dutch Lion from the national coat of arms. Second and fourth quarters are white, adorned by the five-leafed rose with golden sepals from the coat of arms of the House of Lippe. Centred upon the cross is the coat of arms of the Netherlands, topped by a royal crown.
	1908–1934	Standard of the Prince Consort	A quadrangle bearing an orange cross. First and third quarters in Nassau blue, adorned by the Dutch Lion from the national coat of arms. The second and fourth quarters are Azure, adorned by a griffin passant Or langed Gules of the House of Mecklenburg. Centred upon the cross is the coat of arms of the Netherlands, topped by a royal crown.
	1902–1908	Standard of the Prince Consort	A flag with the colours of the historical Royal standard, with the prince's coat of arms at the central band.

=== Dutch governors ===
Flag	Date	Use	Description
	1904–1920	Flag of the governor of Curaçao and Dependencies	National tricolour, within the red stripe two white balls.
	1816–1920	Flag of the governor of Surinam	National tricolour, within the red stripe two white balls.
	1880–1928	Flag of the governor of the Dutch East Indies	National tricolour, within the red stripe two white balls.
	1928–1949	Flag of the governor of the Dutch East Indies	National tricolour, within a white canton two red balls.
	1920–1966	Flag of the governor of Curaçao and Dependencies	National tricolour, within the red stripe three white balls.
	1920–1966	Flag of the governor of Surinam	National tricolour, within the red stripe three white balls.
	1951–1962	Flag of the governor of Dutch New Guinea	National tricolour, within the red stripe three white balls.
	1966–1975	Flag of the governor of Suriname	A white flag with the flag of the Netherlands striped across both the top and the bottom, and the flag of Suriname in the centre.
	1966–1986	Flag of the governor of the Netherlands Antilles	A white flag with the flag of the Netherlands striped across both the top and the bottom, and the flag of the Netherlands Antilles in the centre.
	1986–2010	Flag of the governor of the Netherlands Antilles	A white flag with the flag of the Netherlands striped across both the top and the bottom, and the flag of the Netherlands Antilles in the centre.

=== Military and naval flags ===
Flag	Date	Use	Description
	1957–2023	Flag of the Minister of Defence	Seven horizontal bands in the colour combination red-white-blue-white-red-white-blue in the ratio 1:1:1:6:1:1:1 with the emblem of the armed forces in the middle.
	1974–2005	Flag of the Chef Defensiestaf	Seven equally high horizontal bands in the colour combination red-white-blue-white-red-white-blue. In the middle a green circle with four swords representing the four armed forces.
	2001–2010	Governmental flag of the Ministry of Defence	Dark purple flag with four orange bands on the hoist side; the right lane is not complete.
	2001–2010	Governmental flag of the Royal Netherlands Navy	Dark blue flag with four orange bands on the hoist side; the right lane is not complete. On the other side is the logo of the Royal Netherlands Navy.
	2001–2010	Governmental flag of the Royal Netherlands Army	Dark green flag with four orange bands on the hoist side; the right lane is not complete. On the other side is the logo of the Royal Netherlands Army.
	2001–2010	Governmental flag of the Royal Netherlands Air Force	Dark blue flag with four orange bands on the hoist side; the right lane is not complete. On the other side is the logo of the Royal Netherlands Air Force.
	2001–2010	Governmental flag of the Royal Marechaussee	Dark blue flag with four orange bands on the hoist side; the right lane is not complete. On the other side is the logo of the Royal Marechaussee.
	?	Pilot flag	A flag of three equally wide bands of red, white, and blue with a ratio of 3:2, bordered on all sides in white with a width equal to the width of the band.

== House flags ==
Flag	Date	Company	Description
Current flags
	?–present	Boskalis	Flag divided diagonally into two halves, yellow on the top fly and navy blue on the bottom hoist. The blue part contains the company name in white.
	1921–present	Spliethoff^{nl}	Flag divided diagonally into four parts, with the upper part being orange, the fly sky blue, the lower part white and the hoist red. In the centre is the initial of the company name in black.
	1898–present	Wagenborg^{nl}	Flag divided diagonally into four parts, the top and bottom being red, and the other two white. In the centre is a black chimney with two white stripes.
Former flags
	1993–2018	Dockwise	White field with the company's emblem in the centre.
	1970–1997	Nedlloyd	White and blue quartered flag; a gourd cross, formed by two intertwined ropes, and fimbriated in white.
	1907–1965	Batavian Oil Company^{nl}	Two equal red triangles at the top and two equal blue triangles at the bottom, with a white diamond with the royal crown in the middle.
	1888–1966	Royal Packet Navigation Company	Bright red field flag with a white horizontal lozenge, over the full length and height of the flag, charged with the royal crown.
	1885–1974	Holland Steamship Company	White field with the national flag of the Netherlands in the canton and the initials "HSM" in red on the fly.
	1883–1970	Royal Rotterdam Lloyd	A red, rectangular flag with a white cross. In the centre is a blue square with the white letters 'RL' and a crown (not seen here) above it.
	1870–1970	Netherland Line	White field with a blue saltire on which is placed a small red rhombus containing the letter N in white.
	1856–1981	Royal Netherlands Steamship Company	Blue field flag with a white horizontal lozenge, over the full length and height of the flag, charged with the royal crown.
	1621–1792	Dutch West India Company	National flag with company initials, GWC, in black on the white central stripe.
	1630s–1799	Dutch East India Company	National flag with the company's initials, VOC, in black on the white central stripe.
	1602–1630s	Dutch East India Company	Prince's Flag with company initials, VOC, in black on the white central stripe

== See also ==
- Armorial of the Netherlands
- History of the Netherlands
