= Fess =

Ordinary in heraldic blazon in the form of a single, isolated horizontal band

"Argent a fess gules"

In heraldry, a fess or fesse (from Middle English fesse, Old French faisse, and Latin fascia, "band") is a charge on a coat of arms (or flag) that takes the form of a band running horizontally across the centre of the shield. Writers disagree in how much of the shield's surface is to be covered by a fess or other ordinary, ranging from one-fifth to one-third. The Oxford Guide to Heraldry states that earlier writers including Leigh, Holme, and Guillim favour one-third, while later writers such as Edmondson favour one-fifth "on the grounds that a bend, pale, or chevron occupying one-third of the field makes the coat look clumsy and disagreeable." A fess is likely to be shown narrower if it is uncharged, that is, if it does not have other charges placed on it, and/or if it is to be shown with charges above and below it; and shown wider if charged. The fess or bar, termed fasce in French heraldry, should not be confused with fasces.

== Gallery ==
=== Fess ===
Fess cottised

Fess doubly cottised

Fess dancetty

Tierced per fess

Party per fess

Party per fess angled

Party per fess wavy or undy

Party per fess dancetty

Party per fess indented

Party per fess embattled

Party per fess raguly

Party per fess dovetailed

Party per fess potenty

Party per fess urdy

Party per fess trefly-counter-trefly

Party per fess fir-tree topped or sapiné

Party per fess fir-twigged or sapinagé

=== Bar as diminutive of fess ===
Two barrulets

Two bars gemelles

Barry of eight

Barry wavy

Barry nebuly

== Diminutives ==
In English heraldry, two or more such charges appearing together on a shield are termed bars, though there are no definitive rules setting the width of the fess, the bar, nor their comparative width. A shield of (often six or eight) horizontal stripes of alternating colour is called barry. Narrower versions of the bar are called barrulets ("little bars"), and when a shield of horizontal stripes alternating colour is composed of ten or more stripes, it is called barruly or burely instead of barry. A cotise, defined as half the width of a barrulet, may be borne alongside a fess, and often two of these appear, one on either side of the fess. This is often termed "a fess cotised" (also cottised, coticed or cotticed). Another diminutive of the fess called a closet is said to be between a bar and barrulet, but this is seldom found.

== Other uses ==
Three eagles in fess

A fleur-de-lys between two mullets in fess

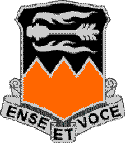
A flaming arrow fesswise

A shield party per fess (or simply per fess) is divided in half horizontally (in the manner of a fess). A charge placed horizontally may be termed fesswise or fessways, and two or more charges arranged in a horizontal row are blazoned in fess or in bar.

== Notable and unusual forms ==
A mural fess, that is a fess embattled and masoned of the field, can be seen in the arms of Suzanne Elizabeth Altvater.

The arms of Rennie Fritchie, Baroness Fritchie provide an example of three Barrulets fracted and there conjoined to a Chevronel.

A flag which has a central horizontal stripe that is half the height of the flag is sometimes said to have a Spanish fess. The name is based on the most well-known example of this style of flag, the flag of Spain.

== On flags ==
=== Fess ===
Flag of Republic of Austria

Flag of Argentina

Flag of El Salvador

Flag of the Republic of Honduras

Flag of Nicaragua

=== Tierced per fess ===
Flag of Republic of Armenia

Flag of Republic of Bolivia

Flag of the Republic of Bulgaria

Flag of the Republic of Estonia

Flag of the Federal Republic of Germany

Flag of the Republic of Hungary

Flag of the Republic of Lithuania

Flag of the Grand Duchy of Luxembourg

Flag of the Kingdom of the Netherlands

Flag of the Russian Federation (Russia)

Flag of Republic of Sierra Leone

Flag of the Republic of Yemen

Flag of Republic of Azerbaijan

Flag of Croatia

Flag of the Arab Republic of Egypt

Flag of the Republic of Ethiopia

Flag of the Republic of Ghana

Flag of the Republic of India

Flag of the Islamic Republic of Iran

Flag of the Republic of Iraq

Flag of the Republic of Malawi

Flag of the Union of Myanmar

Flag of the Republic of Niger

Flag of the Republic of Paraguay

Flag of the Republic of Serbia

Flag of the Republic of Slovakia

Flag of the Republic of Slovenia

Flag of Somaliland

Flag of the Syrian Arab Republic (Syria)

Flag of the Bolivarian Republic of Venezuela

=== Per fess ===
Flag of Indonesia

Flag of the Principality of Monaco

Flag of Poland

Flag of Ukraine

Flag of Burkina Faso

Flag of the Republic of Haiti

Flag of the Duchy of Liechtenstein

Flag of San Marino

Flag of Singapore

==== Per fess counterchanged ====
Flag of Greenland, Kingdom of Denmark

=== Other fess ===
Flag of Costa Rica

Flag of Thailand

=== Variations of charge ===
==== Fimbriated ====
Flag of The Gambia

Flag of Kenya

Presidential Standard of Guyana (former, 1992-1997)

Flag of the former Organization of African Unity (1970–2002) and Flag of the African Union (former, 2004–2010)

Flag of Karakalpakstan, Uzbekistan (double-fimbriated)

==== Cottised ====
Flag of Guelph, Ontario, Canada

==== Embossed (nowy) ====
Naval Ensign and Jack of Austria (1926-1934/5)

Service Flag of the Imperial Colonial Office, German Empire (1892–1918)

Award flag for officers of the Royal Dutch Naval Reserve

Consular flag of Thailand

Flag of Bensenville, Illinois, USA

==== Rompu ====
Flag of the Regional Municipality of Niagara, Canada

=== Lines of partition ===
Flag of Šarkaŭščyna, Belarus (tierced per fess embattled counter-embattled)

Flag of Nanticoke, Pennsylvania, USA (tierced per fess dovetailed)

Flag of Otago, New Zealand (per fess dancetty)

Flag of the 48th annual meeting of the North American Vexillological Association, New Orleans, 2014
(per fess dancetty fleury counterchanged)

Flag of Padberg, Germany (per fess nebuly)

Flag of Montgomery County, Maryland, USA (per fess embattled, per pale counterchanged)

Flag of Zubtsov, Tver Oblast, Russia (per fess urdy)

Flag of Nordkapp Municipality, Norway (per fess angled)

Former flag of South Gyeongsang Province, South Korea (1974–1999, per fess angled)

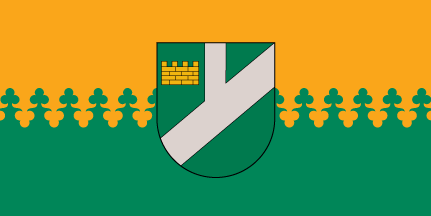
Flag of Pļaviņas, Latvia (per fess trefly-counter-trefly)

Flag of Sudbury, Ontario, Canada (per fess fir-tree topped/kuusikoro/sapiné)

Flag of Rägavere Parish, Estonia (per fess fir-tree topped/kuusikoro/sapiné)

Flag of Räpina Parish, Estonia (per fess fir-tree topped/kuusikoro/sapiné)

Flag of Aloja, Latvia (per fess fir-twigged/sprigged/havukoro/sapinagy)

=== Charges in fess ===
Flag of Iraq

Flag of Syria

Flag of the Tennessee General Assembly, USA

Flag of Amsterdam, North Holland, Netherlands

Flag of Drenthe, Netherlands

Flag of Water Orton, Warwickshire, United Kingdom

Flag of Caernarfonshire, Wales, United Kingdom

Flag of Chicago, Illinois, USA

Flag of Wheeling, West Virginia, USA

=== Charges fesswise ===
Flag of Mallorca, Balearic Islands, Spain

Flag of the Lord High Admiral of the United Kingdom

US Navy Jewish Worship Pennant

Flag of Meiwa, Gunma, Japan (ceremonial)

=== Charges fesswise reversed ===
Flag of Algeria

Flag of Azerbaijan

Flag of Libya

Flag of Tunisia

Flag of Turkey

== See also ==
- Spanish fess
- Bar (heraldry)
- Pale (heraldry)
