= Flag of Groningen =

Flag of Groningen may refer to:

- Flag of Groningen (city)
- (Groningen (province)) Flag of Groningen (province)
