= Flags of the provinces of the Netherlands =

Map illustrating provinces of the Netherlands and their flags

This list contains all twelve official flags of the provinces of the Netherlands, including the pennons.

Provincial flags tend to have a long historical history. Flags have made an important contribution to forming a national or regional identity since time immemorial. This also applies to Dutch provincial flags, which often have a long tradition. Yet, research shows that quite a few Dutch people do not or hardly recognize the flag of their province. The 12 provincial flags are placed below in order of seniority. During official occasions, they are also placed from left to right (for the spectator) in this manner, starting with the flag of North Brabant.

Dutch provinces have their own pennons in addition to their own flags. However, these are unofficial, so no flag protocol applies to them. They can therefore be hoisted at any time.

== Current flags ==
Province	Coat of arms	Flag	Pennon	Description	Adoption
North Brabant				Main article: Flag of North Brabant The flag, also called Brabants Bont, which consists of a chequered pattern with 24 squares executed in red and white, has its roots in the Middle Ages. The motif appeared in Brabantian banners and standards since the proclamation of the County of Louvain, and a little later it was also adopted by the Duchy of Brabant. In the 18th century, the design fell into disuse, only to make a comeback in the 20th century.	21 January 1959
Gelderland				Main article: Flag of Gelderland The flag takes the form of a horizontal tricolour. The colours used are blue, yellow and black. The colours in the design are derived from the provincial coat of arms. The central element of the coat of arms is a shield carried by two lions. The left half shows a golden lion on a blue shield, while the right half shows the black lion of Jülich. The black lion stands out against a gold background.	15 April 1953
South Holland				Main article: Flag of South Holland The flag shows a red lion standing out prominently against an even yellow background. The flag is a banner of arms of the provincial coat of arms. This shield is in turn grafted onto the coat of arms of Holland. The colour choice is also obvious; after all, yellow and red have traditionally been the colours of the province of Holland. The left-facing lion, standing on its hind legs, occupies three-quarters of the flag's height and is equally distant from the top and bottom.	24 October 1985
North Holland				Main article: Flag of North Holland The flag consists of three horizontal bands in the colours yellow, red and blue. The colours are taken from the provincial coat of arms. This is a combination of the old coats of arms of North Holland and West Friesland. Yellow (actually gold) and red belong to Holland, while blue is part of the West Frisian identity. The colour sequence of the provincial flag was also determined this way in the current design because otherwise the flag would look too much like the red-white-blue striping pattern of the Dutch flag.	22 October 1958
Zeeland				Main article: Flag of Zeeland The crown and shield of the provincial coat of arms occupies a prominent place on the flag. These symbols are surrounded by wavy stripes in the colours blue and white. The blue stripes symbolize the constant battle against water, an important element of its history and identity. The coat of arms consists of a lion wrestling with the waves. The upper half shows a 'climbing lion', depicted in half. The lower half shows six wavy stripes, 'the sea'. The whole thing wrongly suggests a lion fighting the raging waves. In the past, there was actually no such thing. In fact, in the old coat of arms, the lion and waves were separated by a clean line. This flag was designed by Tjalling Aedo Johan Willem Schorer.	14 January 1949
Utrecht				Main article: Flag of Utrecht (province) The flag consists of a white and a red stripe. Both stripes are displayed horizontally. The upper left corner of the white stripe is decorated with a red canton containing a white cross on the inside. The design is a mixture of two older flags, namely those of the Archdiocese and the Prince-Bishopric of Utrecht. In practice, the provincial flag is relatively unknown and enjoys little popularity.	15 January 1952
Friesland				Main article: Flag of Friesland This is probably the best known and most recognizable Dutch provincial flag. It flies abundantly during (inter)national skating competitions and is also used by one of the largest and oldest dairy producers. Moreover, the design is the basis of the home shirt of popular football club SC Heerenveen. The flag consists of four blue and white diagonal stripes. The white stripes are decorated with seven red seeblatts (pompeblêden). Those symbols refer to the so-called Frisian 'sea countries'. These were independent, coastal regions that formed a defensive alliance against the Normans in the Middle Ages.	9 July 1957
Overijssel				Main article: Flag of Overijssel The flag consists of two red and yellow stripes along with a blue wave in the middle. The blue stripe is wavy and depicts the river IJssel. The yellow and red stripes express its historical connection with the province of Holland. The current flag is the only one the province has ever had.	21 July 1948
Groningen				Main article: Flag of Groningen (province) This is undoubtedly one of the most colourful provincial flags in the Netherlands. The flag consists of two crosses - one green on one white - surrounded by two red and two blue corners. The design combines elements and colours of the arms of Ommelanden (red, white and blue) and the city of Groningen (green and white). It is no coincidence that Groningen's city colours form a cross at the centre of the flag. In fact, that placement in the centre symbolizes the central location of the city of Groningen in the province. Because of the cross, the flag can also be associated with flags of Nordic countries, with which Groningen had trade relations in the past. This flag was designed by Jan Tuin.	17 February 1950
Drenthe				Main article: Flag of Drenthe The flag has a remarkable appearance. The traditional Saxon colours of red and white form the basis of the design. They also link it to the Archdiocese of Utrecht, which administered Drenthe when the area was still part of the Oversticht. Between the white base colour and the two red bands are six red stars and a black tower. The stars represent the districts Zuidenveld, Oostenmoer, Noordenveld, Rolde, Beilen and Diever. The tower is a historical reference to Coevorden Castle. From this castle, the viscounts of Coevorden maintained the law in the name of the bishop of Utrecht for a long time. This flag was designed by Gerlof Auke Bontekoe.	19 February 1947
Limburg				Main article: Flag of Limburg (Netherlands) A fearsome-looking red lion with a crown and double tail occupies a central place on the flag. The lion refers to the old Duchy of Limburg and symbolizes the province. As a symbol of honour, strength, pride and courage, the lion has always been in vogue in royal houses, noble families or other institutions seeking to exude authority and authority. The background of the flag is formed by two horizontally positioned stripes of white (top) and yellow (bottom). The stripes are separated by a narrower blue stripe. This symbolizes the Meuse, the largest river flowing through Limburg. The colours yellow and white respectively represent the marl landscapes in southern Limburg and the sandy soils in northern and central Limburg. They are also part of the provincial coat of arms.	28 July 1953
Flevoland				Main article: Flag of Flevoland The base of the flag consists of two horizontal stripes in the colours blue and green. The stripes are separated by a thinner, partly wavy yellow stripe. In the upper left corner of the flag is a white fleur-de-lis. The partly wavy stripe symbolizes the transformation of the sea into land, while its colour symbolizes cornfields, rapeseed and arable land. The green represents the province's vast meadows, while the blue recalls the fact that Flevoland was conquered from the sea. The white fleur-de-lis is a tribute to Cornelis Lely, the man behind the Zuiderzee Works and the creation of Flevoland.	9 January 1986

== Former flags ==
Province	Coat of arms	Flag	Pennon	Description	Adoption
South Holland				Main article: Flag of South Holland The previous flag was a triband consisting of three horizontal bands; yellow on the top, red in the middle and yellow on the bottom. The colours in the design are derived from the provincial coat of arms. The yellow and red have traditionally been the colours of the province of Holland. This flag was replaced on 24 October 1985 by the current provincial flag.	22 June 1948

== See also ==
- Coats of arms of provinces of the Netherlands
- List of flags of the Netherlands
- Provinces of the Netherlands
