= Aerial perspective =

Atmospheric effects on the appearance of a distant object

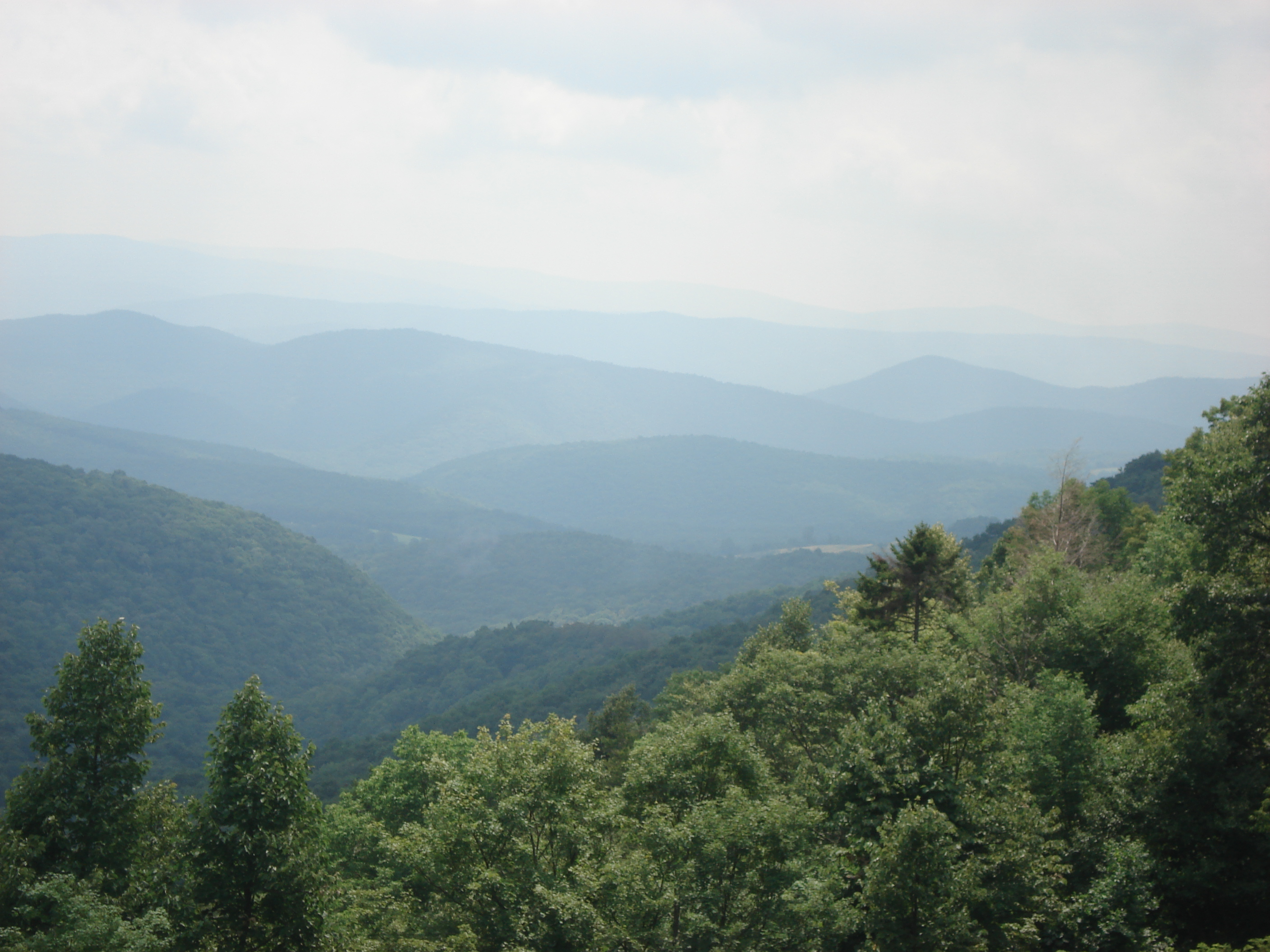
In this picture, the aerial perspective effect is emphasized by a range of mountains at different distances, photographed in a nearly contre-jour condition.

Aerial perspective, or atmospheric perspective, is the effect the atmosphere has on the appearance of an object as viewed from a distance. As the distance between an object and a viewer increases, the contrast between the object and its background decreases, and the contrast of any markings or details within the object also decreases. The colours of the object also become less saturated and shift toward the background colour, which is usually bluish, but may be some other colour under certain conditions (for instance, reddish around sunrise or sunset).

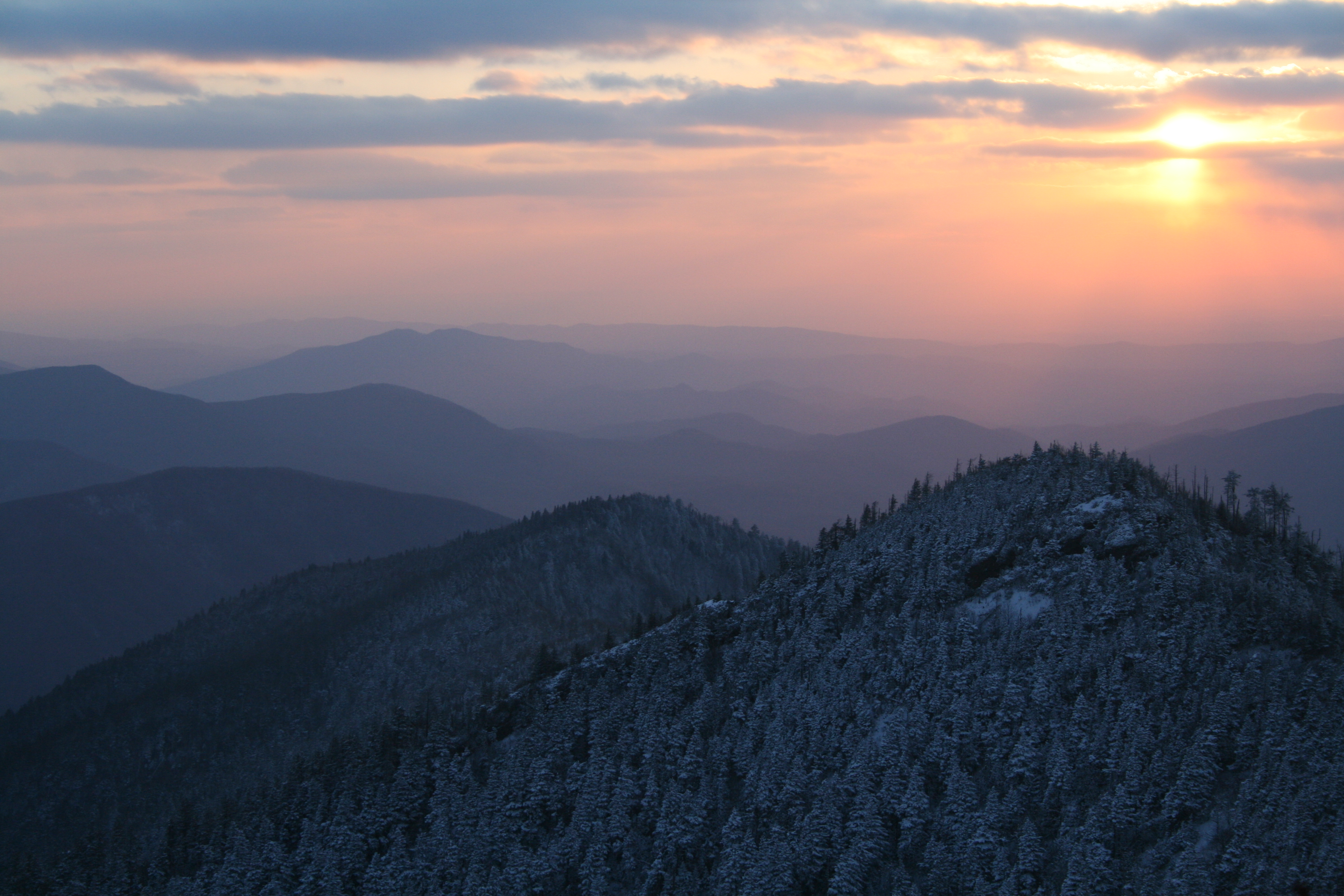
Aerial perspective as viewed towards a sunset, with the colour shifting toward red as a result of rayleigh scattering

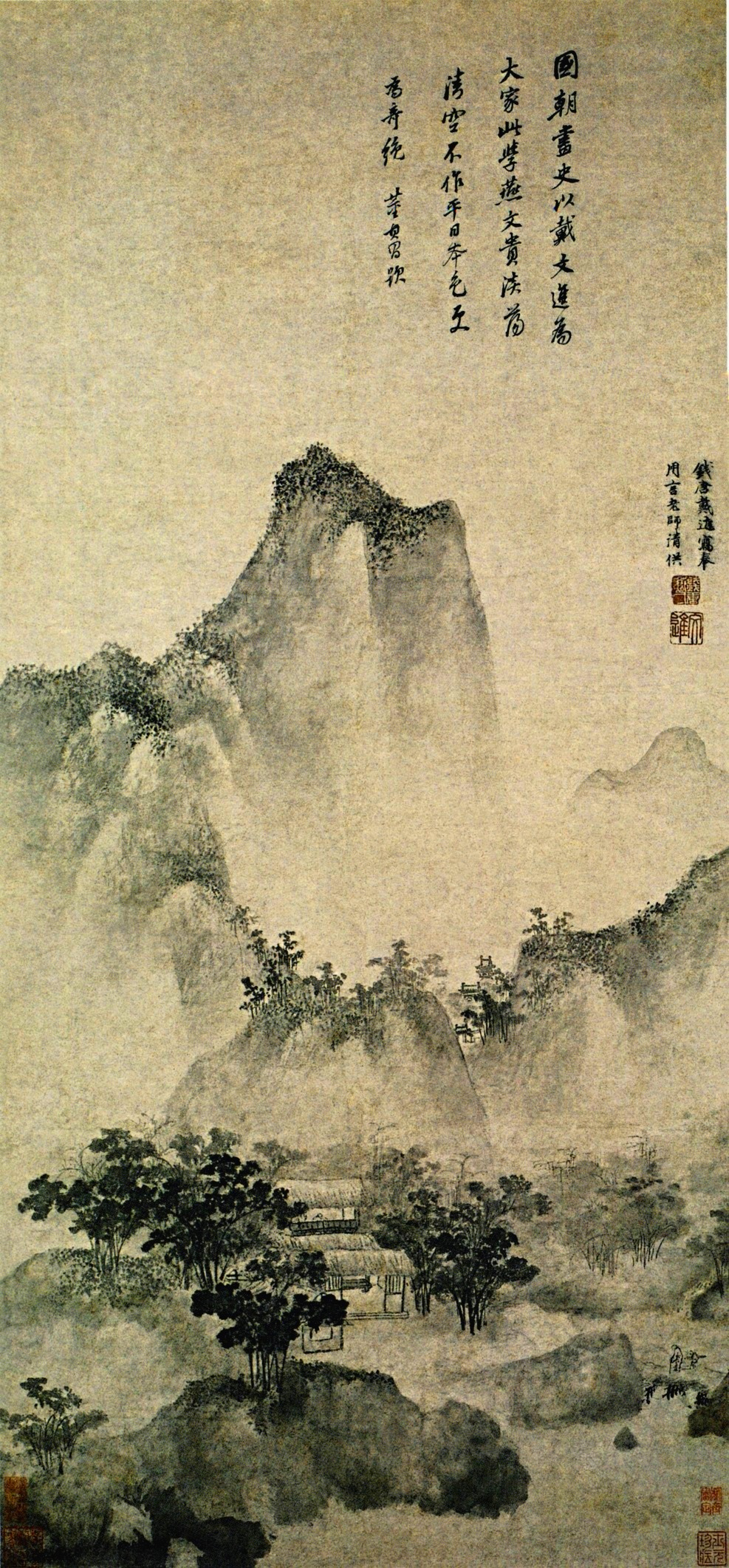
Dai Jin, "Landscape in the Style of Yan Wengui", early Ming Dynasty (1368–1644); a Chinese landscape painting using atmospheric perspective to show recession in space

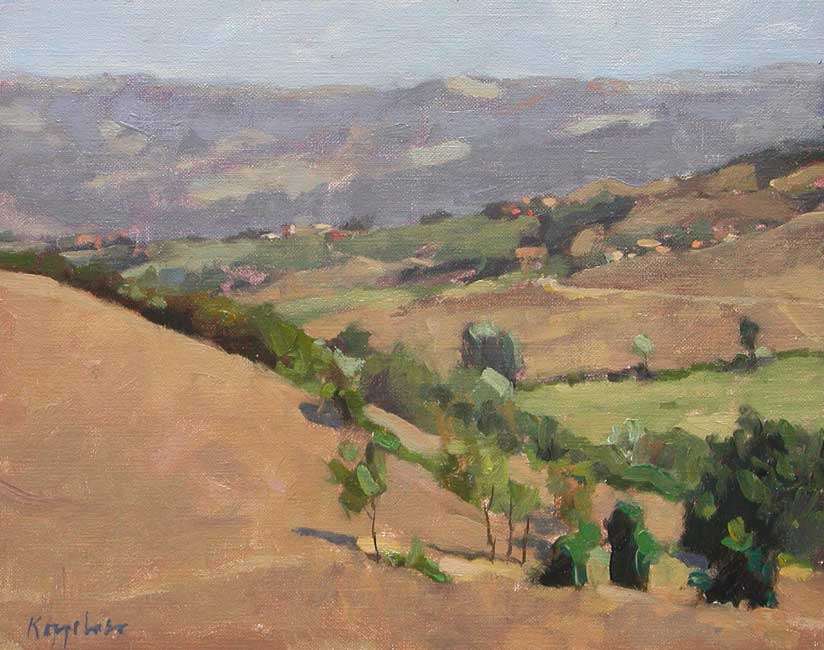
Frans Koppelaar, Landscape near Bologna, 2001; a painting featuring atmospheric perspective: distant objects appear paler, of lower contrast, and bluer than nearer objects.

== History ==
Atmospheric perspective was used in Pompeian Second Style frescos, one of the Pompeian Styles, dating as early as 30 BCE. Notable examples include the Garden Room Fresco from the Villa of Livia in Prima Porta, Italy, and the first-century Pompeian fresco Paris on Mount Ida.

With varying degrees of accuracy, explanations of the effects of atmospheric perspective were written by polymaths such as Leon Battista Alberti and Leonardo da Vinci. The latter used aerial perspective in many of his paintings such as The Annunciation, the Mona Lisa, and The Last Supper, introducing a technique to paint the effect accurately that was adopted by his followers, the Leonardeschi. Art historians note that it is lacking in works by some artists of the same period, such as Raphael, although he adopted the use of sfumato that was introduced by Leonardo at the same time.

Aerial perspective was used in paintings from the Netherlands in the fifteenth century by Leonardo da Vinci.

== Optics ==
The major component affecting the appearance of objects during daylight is scattering of light, called sky light, into the line of sight of the viewer. Scattering occurs from molecules of the air and also from larger particles in the atmosphere such as water vapour and smoke. Scattering adds the sky light as a veiling luminance onto the light from the object, reducing its contrast with the background sky light. Sky light usually contains more light of short wavelength than other wavelengths (this is why the sky usually appears blue), which is why distant objects appear bluish.

== Why reducing contrast reduces clarity ==
The ability of a person with normal visual acuity to see fine details is determined by contrast sensitivity. Contrast sensitivity is the reciprocal of the smallest contrast for which a person can see a sine-wave grating. A person's contrast sensitivity function is contrast sensitivity as a function of spatial frequency. Normally, peak contrast sensitivity is at about four cycles per degree of visual angle. At higher spatial frequencies, comprising finer and finer lines, contrast sensitivity decreases, until at about forty cycles per degree even the brightest of bright lines and the darkest of dark lines cannot be seen.

The high spatial frequencies in an image give it fine details. Reducing the contrast of an image reduces the visibility of these high spatial frequencies because contrast sensitivity for them already is poor. This is how a reduction of contrast can reduce the clarity of an image—by removing its fine details.

Reducing the contrast is not the same as blurring an image. Blurring is accomplished by reducing the contrast only of the high spatial frequencies. Aerial perspective reduces the contrast of all spatial frequencies.

== In art ==
In art, especially painting, aerial perspective or atmospheric perspective refers to the technique of creating an illusion of depth by depicting distant objects as paler, less detailed, and usually bluer than near objects. This technique has a long history in visual art, appearing in ancient Roman frescoes such as those in the Villa of Livia and early Chinese landscape painting such as Eight Views of Xiaoxiang by Dong Yuan.

The technique allows a painter to capture the effect that atmosphere has on the appearance of an object as viewed from a distance. As the distance between an object and a viewer increases, the contrast between the object and its background decreases, and the contrast of any markings or details within the object also decreases. The colours of the object also become less saturated and shift towards the colour of the atmosphere, which is bluish when sunlit, but will shift to other colours under certain conditions (for instance, reddish around sunrise and sunset or saturated during fog).

(One caution: in common speech, the words perspective and viewpoint tend to be used interchangeably; however, in art, aerial perspective does not imply an aerial viewpoint, such as that forming the basis of the aerial landscape genre. The example by Frans Koppelaar pictured here shows the difference. This landscape is a good example of aerial perspective; however, it is not an aerial landscape, since apparently, the observer is standing on the ground.) As such, the term atmospheric perspective can be understood to better describe how properties of the scene's atmosphere affect the appearance of an object as it moves further from the viewer.

== See also ==
- Aerial shot
- Landscape art
- List of art techniques
- Teide
- Tyndall effect
