= Coat of arms of Amsterdam =

Versions
- Escutcheon-only version
- Armiger: City of Amsterdam
- Crest: The Imperial Crown of Austria, proper
- Shield: Gules, a pale Sable charged with three saltorels argent in pale
- Supporters: Two lions rampant proper
- Compartment: A stone pedestal proper
- Motto: Heldhaftig, Vastberaden, Barmhartig (Dutch: "Valiant, Steadfast, Compassionate")

The coat of arms of Amsterdam is the official coat of arms symbol of the city of Amsterdam. It consists of a red shield and a black pale with three silver Saint Andrew's Crosses, the Imperial Crown of Austria, two golden lions, and the motto of Amsterdam. Several heraldic elements have their basis in the history of Amsterdam. The crosses and the crown can be found as decorations on different locations in the city.

== Heraldic elements ==
=== Escutcheon ===
In the coat of arms of Amsterdam, the field of the escutcheon (heraldic shield) is red. The field is charged with three vertically ordered silver or white Saint Andrew's Crosses on top of a black pale. The field and the pale result in three vertical bands in the colours red and black.

The crosses probably have their origin in the shield of the noble family Persijn. The knight Jan Persijn was lord of Amstelledamme (Amsterdam) from 1280 to 1282. In the escutcheons of Dordrecht and Delft, two other cities in Holland, the pale refers to water. In analogy with this, the black pale in the escutcheon of Amsterdam would refer to the river Amstel. Both the colours and the crosses are also found in the escutcheons of two towns near Amsterdam: the village of Ouder-Amstel on the banks of the river Amstel to the southeast, and Nieuwer-Amstel (now the suburb Amstelveen) to the southwest. Both villages were also the property of the Persijn family.

The escutcheon forms the basis for the flag of Amsterdam, but the bands and crosses are positioned horizontally on the flag instead of vertically. The three Saint Andrew's Crosses are used in the logo of the city government and also as decorations on the typical Amsterdam bollards called Amsterdammertjes.

=== Imperial Crown ===
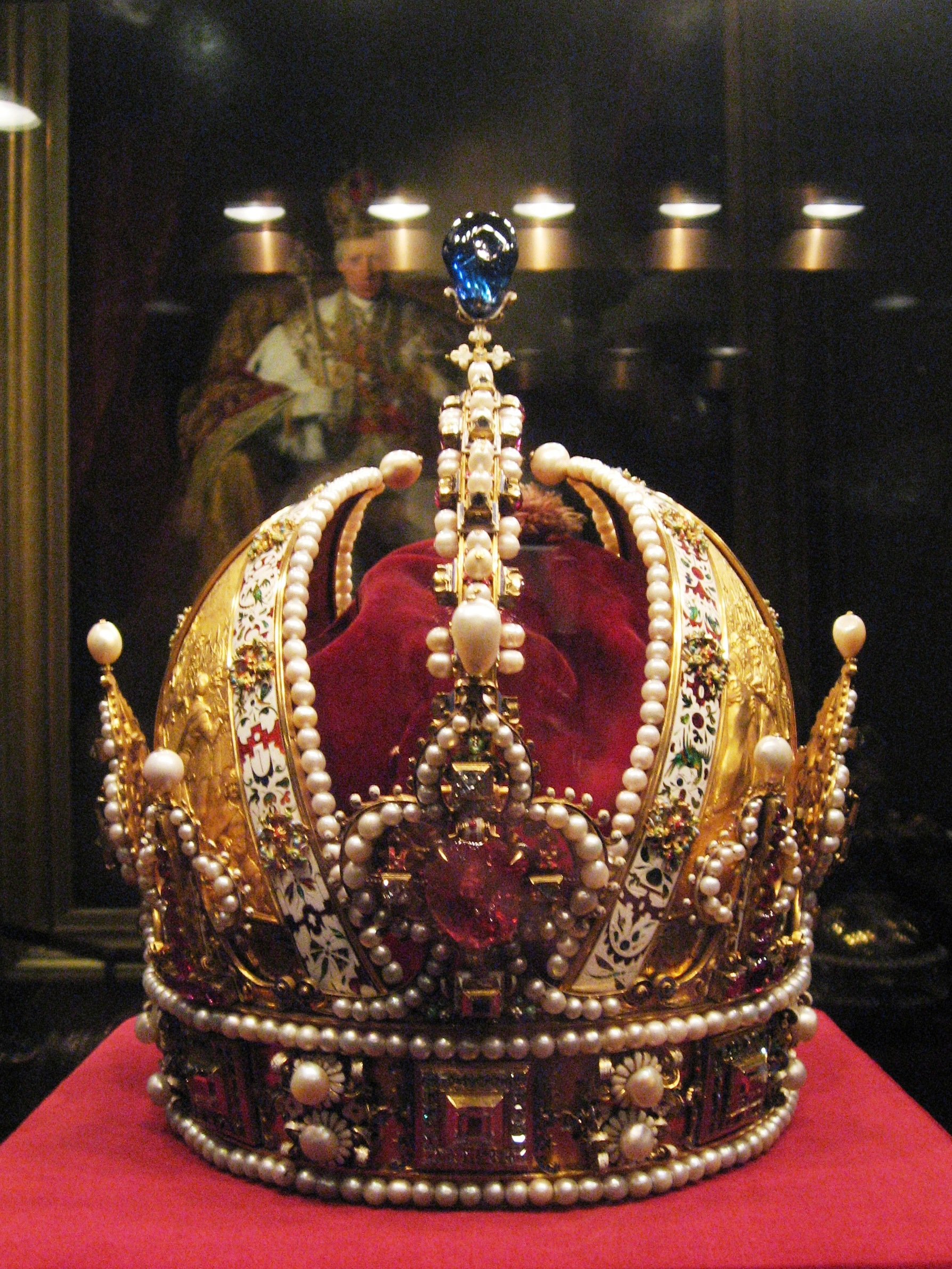
The Imperial Crown of Austria placed upon the escutcheon

During the Hook and Cod wars in Holland in the 15th century, the Holy Roman Emperor Maximilian I supported the bourgeoisie in the cities (Cod) in their fight against the nobility in the countryside (Hook). During these wars Amsterdam loaned large amounts of money to Maximilian I. In 1489, the emperor gave Amsterdam the right to use his personal imperial crown in its coat of arms, out of gratitude for these loans. When his successor Rudolf II created a new personal crown, Amsterdam changed the crown accordingly. After the Reformation, the Protestant Amsterdam continued to use the crown of the Catholic emperor. In 1804, the crown of Rudolf II became the Imperial Crown of Austria. In the coat of arms of Amsterdam, the Imperial Crown is positioned on top of the escutcheon.

The Imperial Crown can be found independently at several locations in Amsterdam. The tower of the Protestant church Westerkerk is crowned with the Imperial Crown and the bridge Blauwbrug is decorated with several Imperial Crowns.

=== Golden lions ===
The supporters of the escutcheon are two rampant golden lions. The compartment the lions stand on is a stone pedestal. The lions were added to the coat of arms in the 16th century.

=== Motto ===
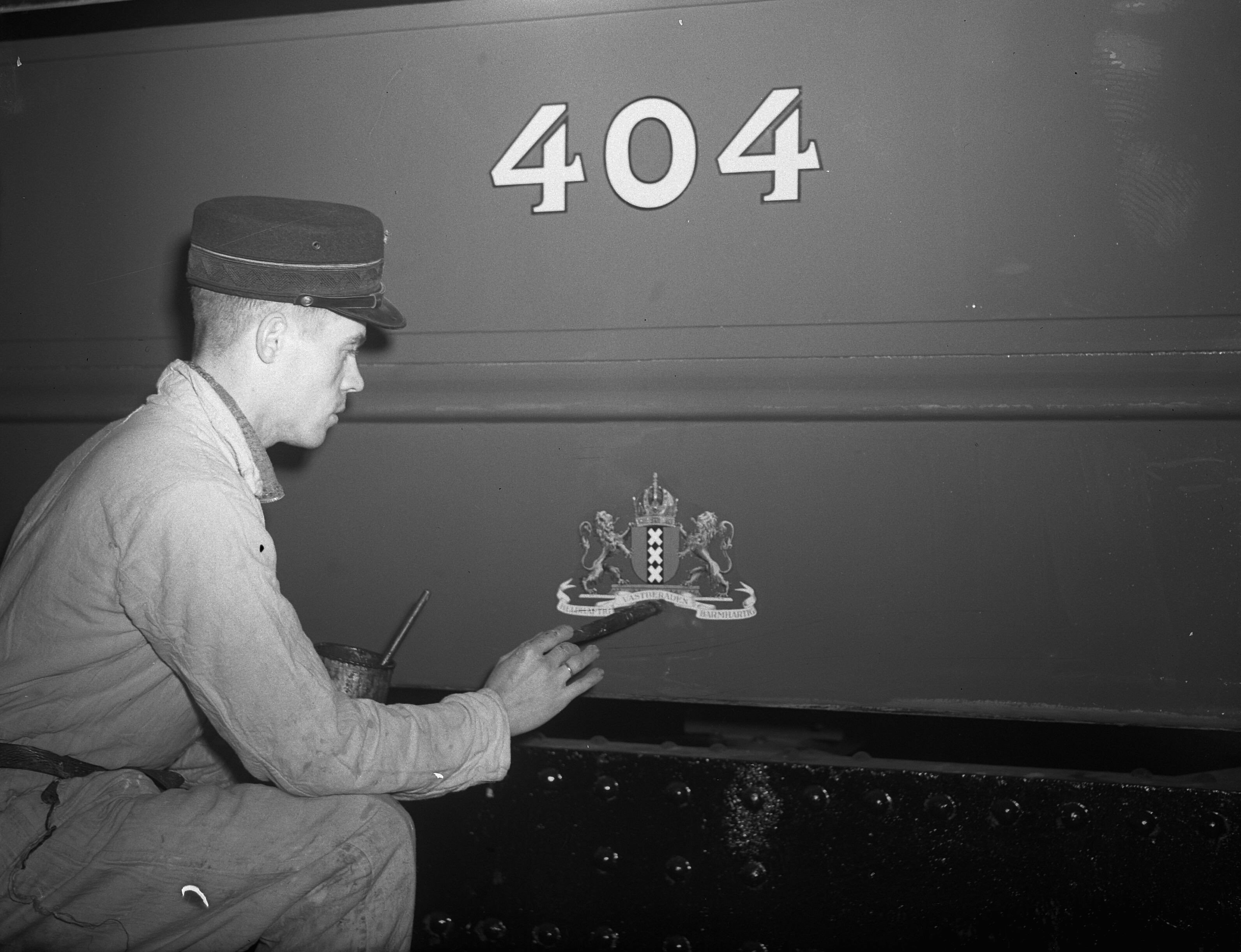
A painter painting the new coat of arms of Amsterdam with motto on one of the city's trams in 1948

During the 1941 February strike in Amsterdam, non-Jewish people protested against the persecution of Jews by the Nazi regime. Queen Wilhelmina wanted to remember the role of the citizens of Amsterdam during World War II and created a motto consisting of the Dutch words "Heldhaftig, Vastberaden, Barmhartig", meaning "Valiant, Steadfast, Compassionate". On March 29, 1947, Wilhelmina presented the motto as part of the coat of arms of Amsterdam to the city government.

Never will I forget the emotion that overwhelmed us, when eyewitnesses first notified us in London of how the entire population had actually turned against the inhumanity of the cruel tyrant.^{[i]}
—Wilhelmina of the Netherlands

In the coat of arms of Amsterdam, the motto is written on a silver scroll. This scroll is positioned on top of the compartment under the escutcheon.

== Usage ==
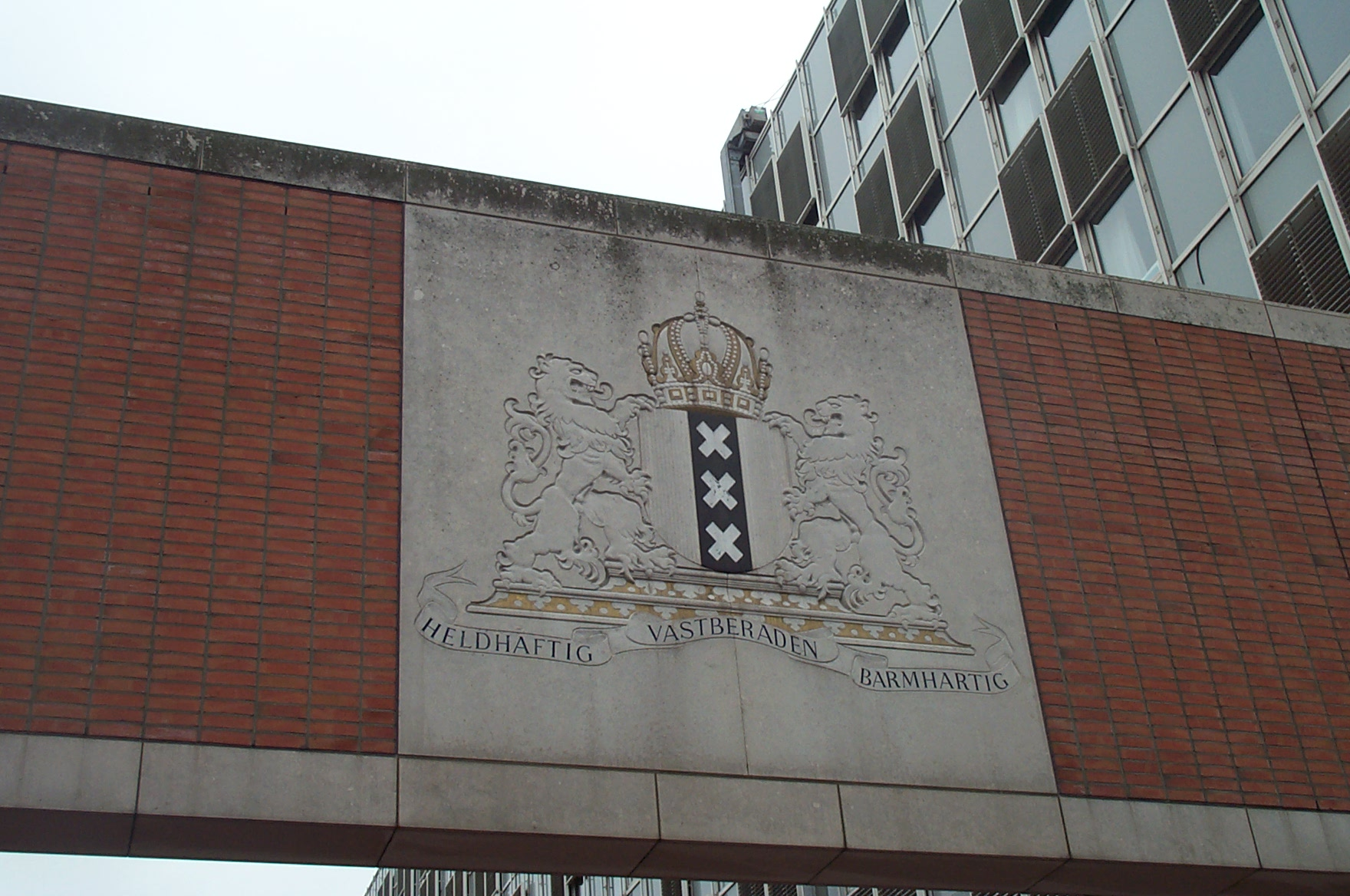
The coat of arms displayed on the Stopera (city hall and opera building)

As a coat of arms of a Dutch municipality, the coat of arms of Amsterdam is registered with the Hoge Raad van Adel (cf. College of Arms). These coats of arms are all effectively in the public domain, as the municipalities cannot claim copyright. In contrast, actually using the coat of arms to suggest any kind of official endorsement is restricted, more comparable to a trademark than a copyright. The coat of arms may only be used by others than the city with the explicit permission of the municipal government. In general permission is not granted to others, because the coat of arms designates the city of Amsterdam. Individual elements, such as the three Saint Andrew's Crosses or the escutcheon may be used by others without permission.

== Notes ==
1. ^{i} Original quote in Dutch: "Nooit zal ik de ontroering vergeten, die zich van ons meester maakte, toen ooggetuigen ons te Londen het eerste bericht brachten, hoe gans een bevolking zich in daadwerkelijk verzet gekeerd had tegen de onmenselijkheid van een wrede dwingeland."
