= Amsterdammertje =

Bollard used in Amsterdam

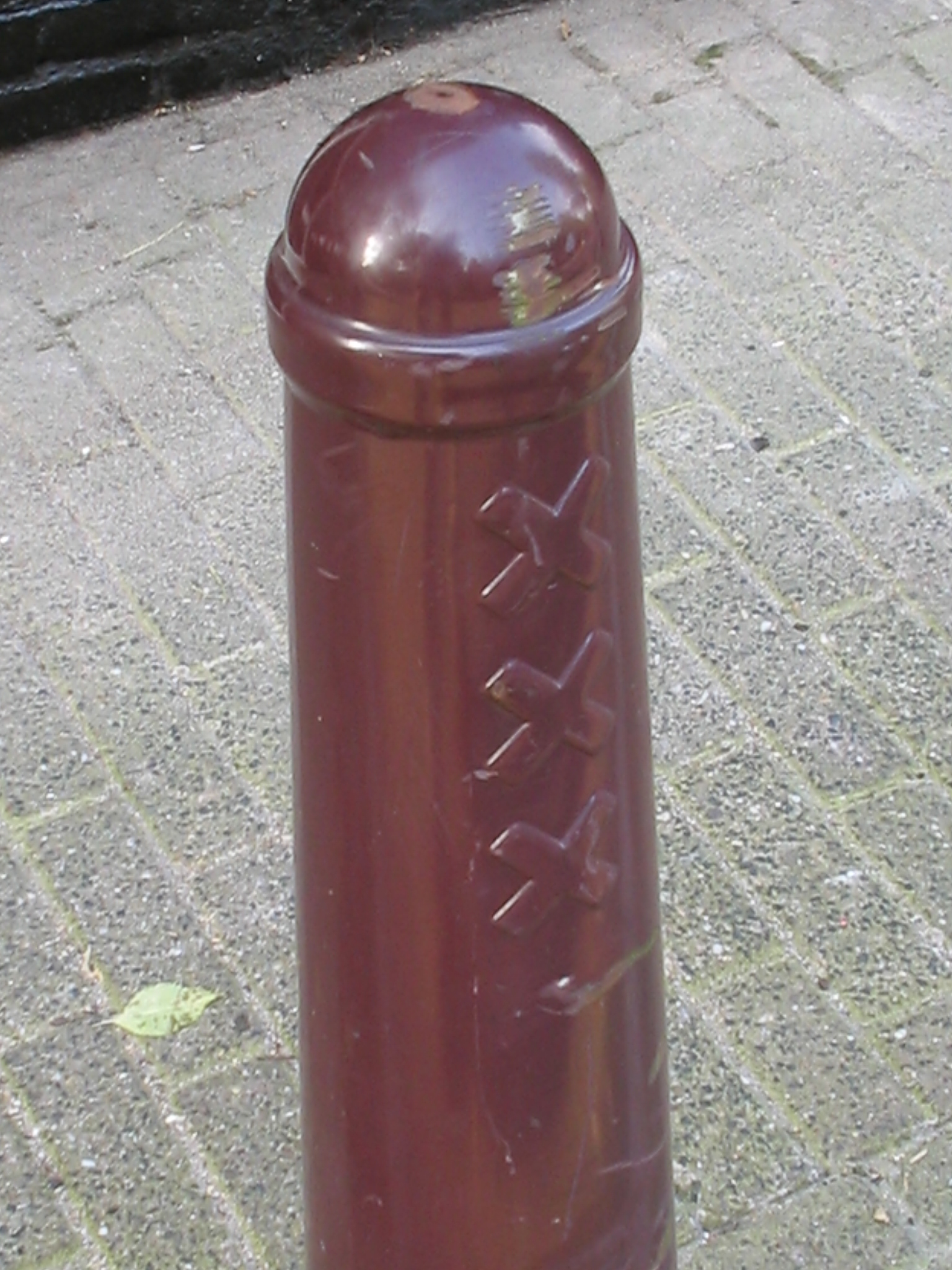
An Amsterdammertje

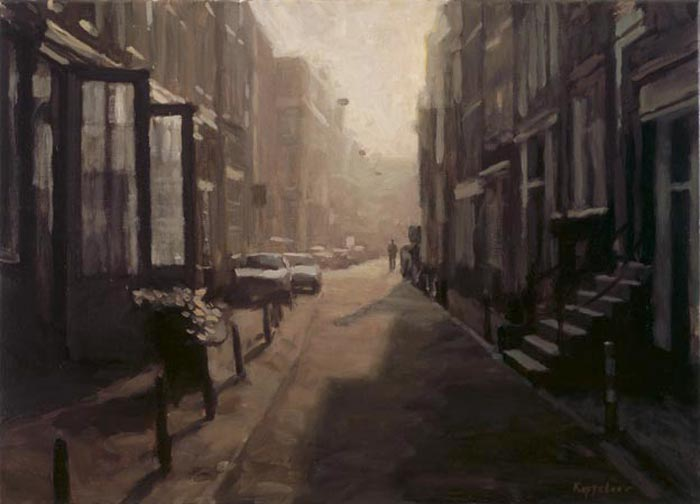
A street with Amsterdammertjes on the painting Backlight Langestraat (1993) by Frans Koppelaar

An Amsterdammertje (Dutch pronunciation: [ˌɑmstərˈdɑmərtɕə]) is the typical red-brown steel traffic bollard that is used to separate the pavement from the street in Amsterdam. Amsterdammertje is Dutch for 'little one from Amsterdam'. The bollards bear the three Saint Andrew's Crosses from the coat of arms of Amsterdam.

Since the 1980s, the city council has been removing and selling Amsterdammertjes.

== History ==
Around 1800, many people in Amsterdam started to use bollards to protect the pavement in front of their houses. These bollards were made of metal (originally old cannons, see also traffic bollards), stone, or wood. In the late 19th century the first cast iron bollards were made.

From 1915 onwards there was a standard bollard of cast iron, weighing 70 kg (154 lb), with three Saint Andrew's Crosses from the coat of arms of Amsterdam. This bollard already looked like the modern Amsterdammertje, although, amongst other differences, it was thinner and heavier.

From 1972 the Amsterdammertjes were no longer made from expensive and heavy cast iron, but from plates of steel, approximately 1.35 m (4 ft 5 1/8 in) high and weighing only 20 kg (44 lb). This type is currently used in the city; all 1915 type bollards have been replaced or removed. In 1984, there were approximately 100,000 Amsterdammertjes.

As trucks ran over the Amsterdammertjes more and more frequently, cars were able to pass between, and the bollards were no longer effective. In their place, the pavements were elevated slightly in the 2000s. Around two thousand Amsterdammertjes are being removed every year. In 2003, there were 37,616 Amsterdammertjes left.

== See also ==
- Traffic cone
