= Flag of South Holland =

Dutch provincial flag

South Holland
- Use: Provincial flag
- Proportion: 2:3
- Adopted: 24 October 1985
- Design: A yellow flag with a red lion rampant towards hoist side

The flag of South Holland was adopted on 24 October 1985, replacing the flag used since 22 June 1948. The flag shows a red lion standing out prominently against an even yellow background. The flag of the most populous province is a banner of arms of the South Holland coat of arms. This shield is in turn grafted onto the coat of arms of Holland. The colour choice is also obvious; after all, yellow and red have traditionally been the colours of the province of Holland. The aspect ratio of the South Holland flag is 2:3, which are the same dimensions that also apply to the national tricolour. The left-facing lion, standing on its hind legs, occupies three-quarters of the flag's height and is equally distant from the top and bottom. The colours red and yellow are Holland's traditional colours and are also found of the flag of North Holland.

== History ==
The first official flag of South Holland was introduced on 22 June 1948. It was a triband consisting of three equal horizontal fields; yellow on the top, red in the middle and yellow on the bottom. It had a ratio of 2:3. The decision to adopt the current flag was motivated by a desire to raise the profile of traditional symbolism of Holland. The current flag closely resembles the cloths used by the counts of the County of Holland since the Crusades.

The current flag was proposed by the provincial executive of South Holland on 15 October, and passed by the States of South Holland on 24 October 1985. It was decided to change the flag into a yellow field with a red rampant lion–the old flag of the Counts of Holland, which according to tradition had been in use since the time of the Crusades. The lion was supposed to symbolize the "always victorious lion of Judah". The flag became official on 1 January 1986.

The flag of South Holland used between 1948 and 1985.

== Design ==
The flag of South Holland has a ratio of 2:3. It features a red lion rampant facing left on a yellow field. The lion covers three-fourths of the flag's height, and is positioned on one-thirds of the flag's width.
