= Flag of Eindhoven =

Flag of the city of Eindhoven

Eindhoven
- Use: Municipal flag
- Proportion: 2:3
- Adopted: October 14, 1927; 99 years ago
- Design: Two vertical stripes in red and white in the hoist side, and five horizontal strips alternatively in red and white
- Designed by: Louis Kooken
- Use: Municipal standard
- Adopted: October 14, 1927; 99 years ago
- Design: Two vertical stripes in red and white in the hoist side, and five horizontal strips alternatively in red and white, with a banner of arms in the canton.

The flag of Eindhoven, the fifth-largest city in the Netherlands, was adopted at the meeting of the municipal executive on 14 October 1927 and confirmed by the college on 4 October 1994. The municipal flag has two vertical stripes on the hoist side. In addition, five horizontal stripes in red and white can be seen. These horizontal stripes represent the five former municipalities that made up Eindhoven before 1920. The flag colours come from the corresponding municipal coat of arms and also form the colours of the provincial flag of North Brabant. The ratio is 2:3. The flag was designed by architect Louis Kooken.

In the olden days, the municipality used a horizontal bicolour in the colours red and white, making the flag identical to the flag of Indonesia, and the flag of Monaco.

== Municipal standard ==
A municipal standard was also adopted at the same time, and is basically the same as the municipal flag: it consists of red and white stripes. The difference is in the canton at the top left. This shows a red standing lion and three post horns. These images are both taken from the municipal coat of arms. The coat of arms was originally traced to the arms of the lords of Brabant and Cranendonck, specifically the House of Hornes family, a branch of this noble family. This is where the post horns come from. The lion comes from the coat of arms of the Duke of Brabant and represented his power. This makes Eindhoven the only municipality in the Netherlands with two official flags: a municipal flag and a municipal standard.

== Bibliography ==
- Sierksma, Klaes (1962). Nederlands vlaggenboek. Het Spectrum. pp. 60–61. ISBN 9789031502882.
- van Ham, Willem (2023). Noord-Brabantse wapens en vlaggen. Walburg Pers. pp. 118–120. ISBN 9789464560381.
