= Royal Netherlands Navy Reserve =

- Dutch: Koninklijke Marine Reserve
- Active: 1894–present
- Country: Netherlands
- Branch: Royal Netherlands Navy
- Type: Naval Reserve
- Size: 1.359 personnel (2022)

The Royal Netherlands Navy Reserve (Dutch: Koninklijke Marine Reserve; KMR) is the reserve force of the Royal Netherlands Navy (RNLN). It was established in 1894 and consists of five units.

== History ==
The Royal Netherlands Navy Reserve (KMR) was established in 1894 as reserve force for the Royal Netherlands Navy (RNLN). The idea behind the creation of the KMR was that it allowed the RNLN to draw upon able personnel that it could depend on during wartime or in the case of a threat of war. During its first years the KMR was small in terms of numbers and had as goal to be able to provide 600 men during war.

In 2022 the KMR consisted of 1.359 reserves, who all have undergone basic military training.

== Organisation ==
The KMR has five units:

=== Office of Maritime Affairs ===
The Office of Maritime Affairs (Dutch: Bureau Maritieme Zaken) coordinates interaction and matters between military and civilian shipping. It also informs and assists merchant ships and fishing vessels if they sail through dangerous areas.

=== Event support ===
Event support (Dutch: Ondersteuning evenementen) supports and organizes events. These events range from general Dutch armed forces related events to specific RNLN related events. During larger events reserves sometimes also have a coordinating or advisory role.

=== Ceremonial ===
The Ceremonial (Dutch: Ceremonieel) unit provides support with ceremonial protocols of the RNLN and sometimes performs these protocols on its own.

=== Specialists KM ===
Specialists KM (Dutch: Specialisten KM) is a unit that consists of reserves that have specific knowledge or skills that can be deployed when the Dutch Ministry of Defence lacks own personnel with this knowledge or these skills.

=== Operational unit ===
The Operational unit (Dutch: Operationele eenheid) provides personnel when there is a shortage in any of the operational units of the RNLN.

== Citations ==
=== Bibliography ===
- Beckers, Anne (November 2022). "Een eerste aanzet: De oprichting van het officierskorps van de KMR in 1894" (PDF). Marineblad (in Dutch). Vol. 132, no. 7. pp. 30–35.
