= Flag of Groningen (city) =

Flag of city and municipality in the Netherlands

Groningen
- Use: Municipal flag
- Proportion: 3:2
- Design: A horizontal triband of white, green and white.

The flag of the city of Groningen was never officially adopted.

== Design ==
The flag is a tricolour consisting of three horizontal stripes, each of which is the same height. The stripes have the colours white, green and white from top to bottom. The flag has an aspect ratio of 2:3. The colours, like those of the municipal coat of arms, are taken from the coat of arms of the Groningen prefects. These were representatives of the bishop of Utrecht in the city of Groningen.

== History ==
From the 17th century onwards, Groningen flags and banners often used the city coat of arms, possibly combined with the colours green and white. In its current form with three stripes, the flag is first found in 1879. Later, in 1897, Mayor Modderman announced ‘that the flag of this municipality consists of three bands of equal width, the middle one being coloured green and the other two white’.

The flag of the province of Groningen was partly derived from the city of Groningen flag in 1950.
