= Flag of Utrecht (province) =

Dutch provincial flag

Utrecht
- Use: Provincial flag
- Proportion: 9:13≈ (de facto 2:3)
- Adopted: 15 January 1952
- Design: Horizontal bicolour flag in white and red, and a red square filling with white cross in the canton.

The flag of Utrecht (Dutch: vlag van Utrecht) has been in use since 15 January 1952. It consists of two horizontal stripes of equal width, the upper one white and the lower one red. Similar to the flag of Poland or an upside-down flag of Monaco, and that of Indonesia. In the top left corner of the flag, there is a red square with a white cross. The flag originates from two other flags, one part of the Archdiocese of Utrecht, and the other of the (territorial) Archbishopric of Utrecht. In 1951 the province was advised by the Hoge Raad van Adel to adopt a flag to represent the province. The current banner has been the recognized provincial flag of Utrecht since 1952. In practice, the Utrecht provincial flag is relatively unknown and enjoys little popularity.
