= Flag of Amsterdam =

Amsterdam
- Use: Municipal flag
- Proportion: 2:3
- Adopted: 5 February 1975; 51 years ago
- Design: Horizontal tricolour (red-black-red) with three white Andrew's crosses in the black band
- The banner of Arms of Amsterdam
- Proportion: 1:1
- Adopted: 1280; 746 years ago
- Design: Vertical tricolour (red-black-red) with three white saltires in the black band

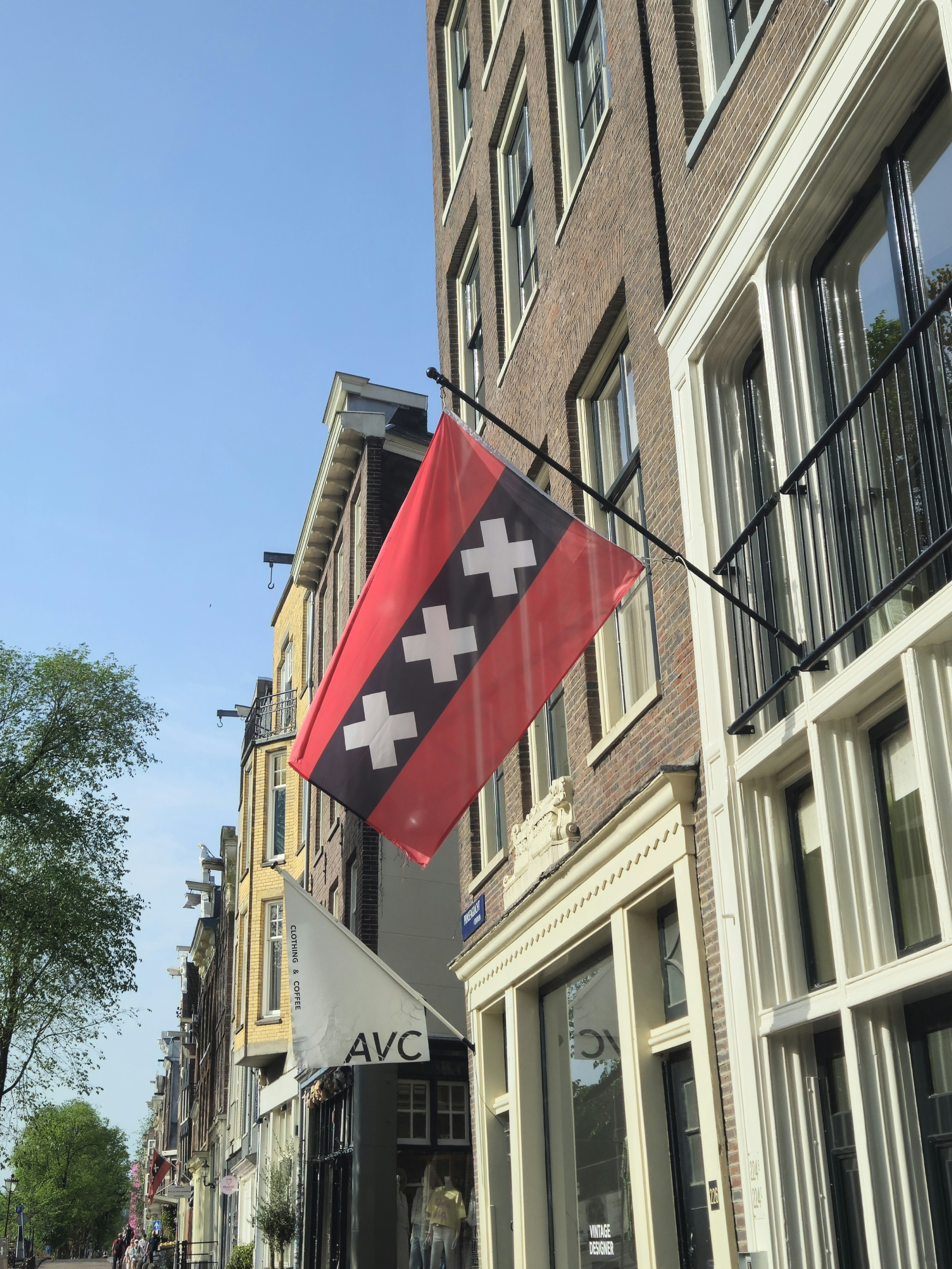
Flying flag of Amsterdam

The current city flag of Amsterdam depicts three Saint Andrew's Crosses and is based on the escutcheon in the coat of arms of Amsterdam. The flag is very similar to the flag of Amstelveen.

== Meaning ==
The colours of the flag are derived primarily from the shield of Amsterdam's coat of arms. According to the city government, its origin could go back to the coat of arms of the Persijn family, which once owned a large tract of land in the capital. These colours, as well as the crosses, are to be seen in the flags of both Ouder-Amstel and Amstelveen.

The popular legend that the three Saint Andrew's crosses were meant to ward off fire, floods and the black plague is unfounded as the use of three St. Andrews crosses by noble families in the area precedes the arrival of the Black Death in Europe.

In the coats of arms of two other Dutch cities, Dordrecht and Delft, the middle stripe symbolises water. Regarding Amsterdam, this black strip becomes the River Amstel. This could be why other references state that the three crosses represent three fordable places in the river Amstel.

== History ==
Cover of the 1928 Summer Olympics day program

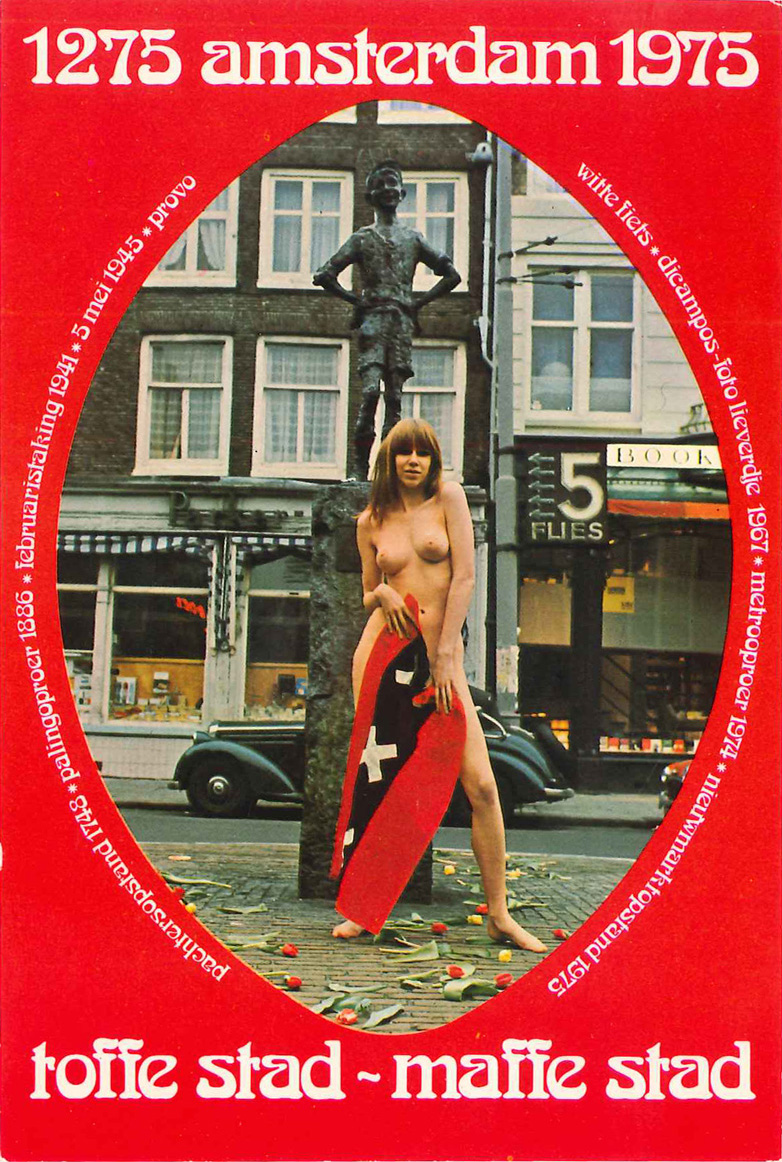
The flag of Amsterdam, presented in the 1970s by Dutch artist Phil Bloom with the inscription "cool city, crazy city"

The flag was officially adopted on 5 February 1975 although it was already in use before this date, seen for example on the cover of the day programme of the 1928 Summer Olympics held in Amsterdam. Before its official adoption, there was also an unofficial use of a flag with the city's coat of arms in the middle of a red-white-black horizontal tricolour. Such a design was already in use in the 17th century, but in Amsterdam history, other designs in the colours red, black and white were also used. Sometimes, the three St. Andrew crosses were placed in the white orbit of the red–white–blue Dutch national flag.

== February Strike Flag ==
February strike flag

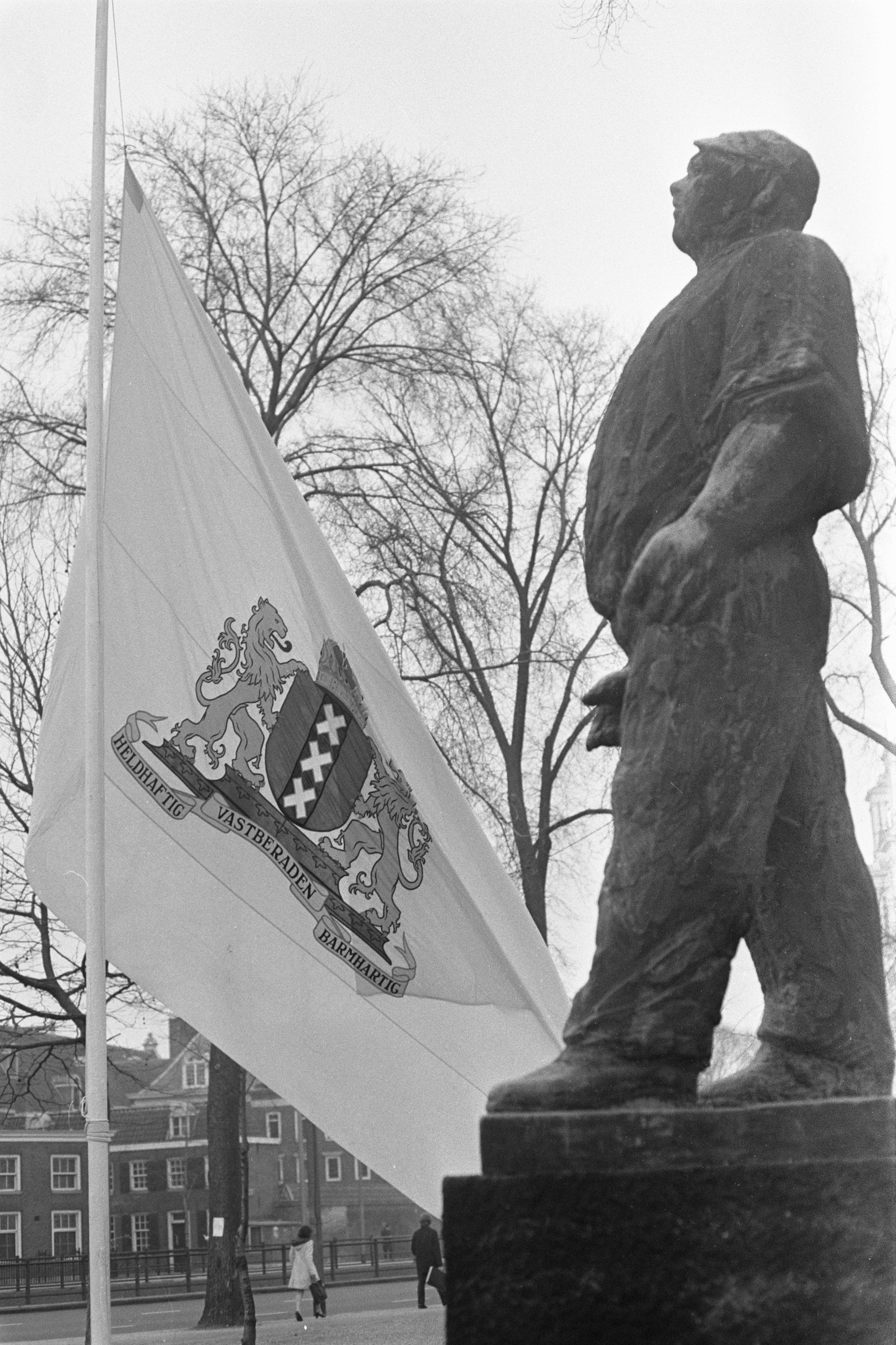
Commemoration February strike with flag at half-mast at the dockworker

The February Strike Flag was awarded to the city by Queen Wilhelmina on 17 December 1947. It was a token of appreciation for the massive resistance of the people of Amsterdam against the Jewish persecution, as expressed during the February strike in 1941. The flag is an important symbol in the annual commemoration of the strike. The flag was designed by Pam Rueter and made by students of the Industrial School for Women's Youth. A copy was later made due to wear and tear. The original flag ended up in a depot of the Amsterdams Historisch Museum in the 1970s, where it was recovered in 2008. This banner was subsequently preserved for further preservation.

The flag consists of a variant of the city coat of arms on a white background and refers to the courage of the city during the World War II. The resistance flag is raised at commemorations.

== Uses ==
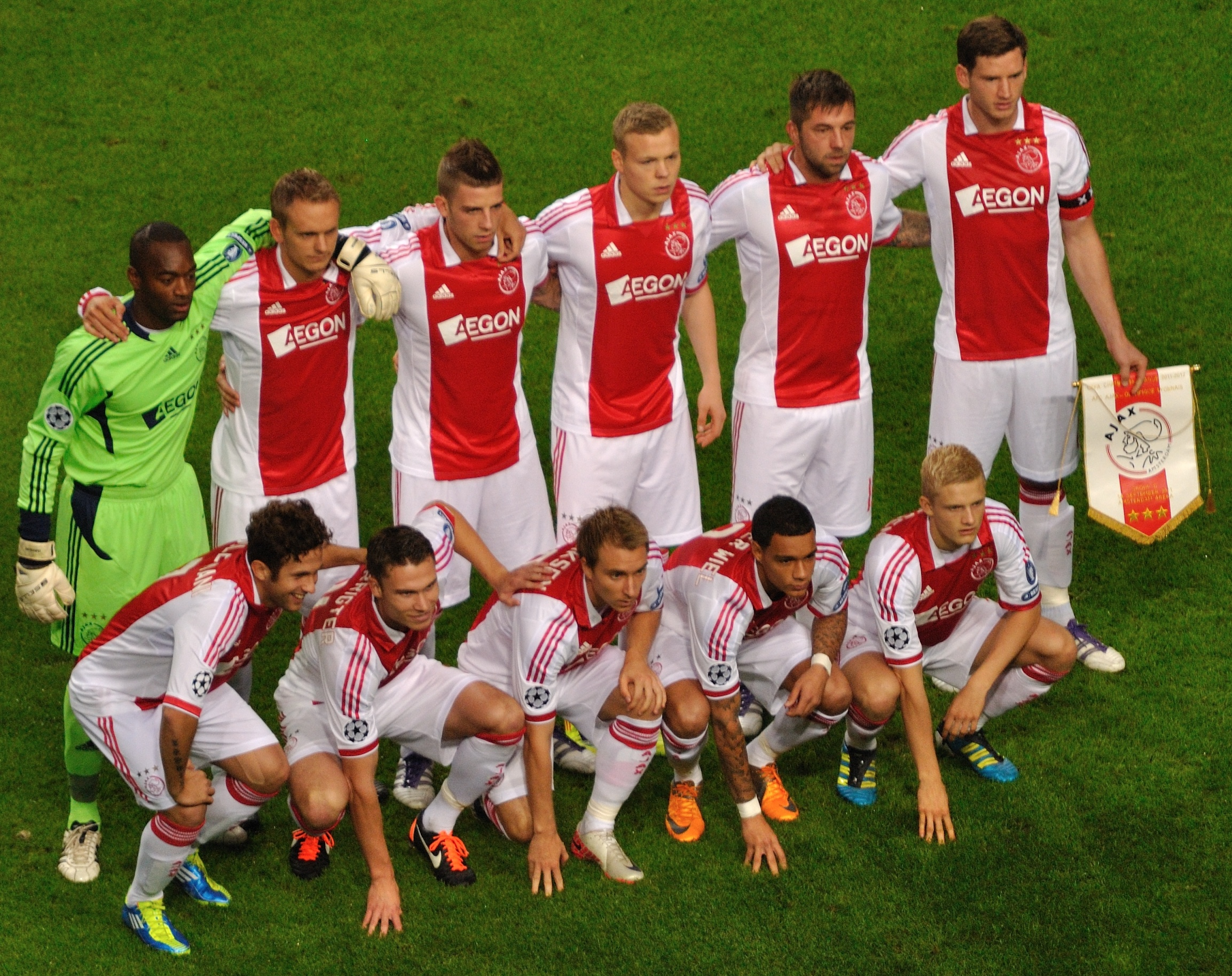
AFC Ajax squad line-up ahead of the game against Lyon (14 September 2011). Captain Jan Vertonghen is seen wearing the Amsterdam flag as his captain's armband.

The three crosses can be found on all kinds of buildings, in many logos and also on the Amsterdammertje's. AFC Ajax, an Amsterdam-based football team who plays in the Dutch Eredivisie, uses the Amsterdam flag as their captain's armband.

== Historical flags ==
16th century

17th century – 1975

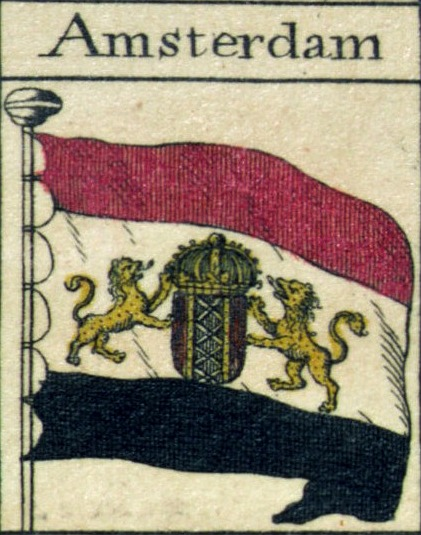
Flag of Amsterdam, as drawn on a flag chart in 1783
