= Flag of Flevoland =

Dutch provincial flag

Flevoland
- Use: Provincial flag
- Proportion: 2:3
- Adopted: 9 January 1986
- Design: A flag with three stripes in blue, a thinner yellow one wavy on the left side, green, and a white fleur-de-lis is placed in the canton.

The flag of Flevoland is the official flag of the Dutch province of Flevoland. It was hoisted for the first time on 9 January 1986, and formally defined as the provincial flag on 15 February 1989.

== Description ==
The aspect ratio of the flag is 2:3.

The flag recalls how the new province was reclaimed from the IJsselmeer. The central narrow yellow stripe, wavy on the left then straight toward the right, symbolises the transformation of the sea into land. Its color symbolises rapeseed, cornfields, and agronomy. The blue represents water, and the green the rural landscape.

The white fleur-de-lys (lily) is a pun, known in heraldry as canting arms. It commemorates Cornelis Lely, designer of the original polders, essential to the province. The flag of Lelystad, the provincial capital, is decorated with the same flower.
