= Flag of Zeeland =

Dutch provincial flag

Zeeland
- Use: Provincial flag
- Proportion: 3∶2
- Adopted: 14 January 1949
- Design: A flag with wavy bands in blue and white, and the coat of arms of Zeeland in the centre.
- Designed by: Tjalling Aedo Johan Willem Schorer

The flag of Zeeland was adopted on 14 January 1949. The crown and shield of the coat of arms of Zeeland occupy a prominent place on the Zeelandic flag. These symbols are surrounded by wavy stripes in the colours blue and white. The blue stripes symbolize the constant battle against water, an important element of Zeelandic history and identity. The coat of arms consists of a lion wrestling with the waves. The upper half shows a 'climbing lion', half depicted. The lower half shows six wavy stripes, 'the sea'. The whole thing wrongly suggests a lion fighting the raging waves. In the past, there was actually no such thing. In fact, in the old coat of arms, the lion and waves were separated by a clean line. The flag of Zeeland was designed in 1948 and was declared a provincial flag in 1949. This flag was designed by Tjalling Aedo Johan Willem Schorer.
