= Flag of Limburg (Netherlands) =

Dutch provincial flag

Limburg
- Use: Provincial flag
- Proportion: 1:2≈ (de facto 2:3)
- Adopted: 28 July 1953
- Design: A flag with tricolour band in white, blue and yellow (proportion 2:1:2), and a red lion rampant towards hoist side.

The flag of Limburg is a flag with the ratio of approximately 1:2 (de facto 2:3). It consists of 3 rows of colors in a size ratio of 2:1:2. The colors used are (from top to bottom) white, blue and gold (yellow). The flag was adopted by decree of the provincial executive of Limburg on 28 July 1953.

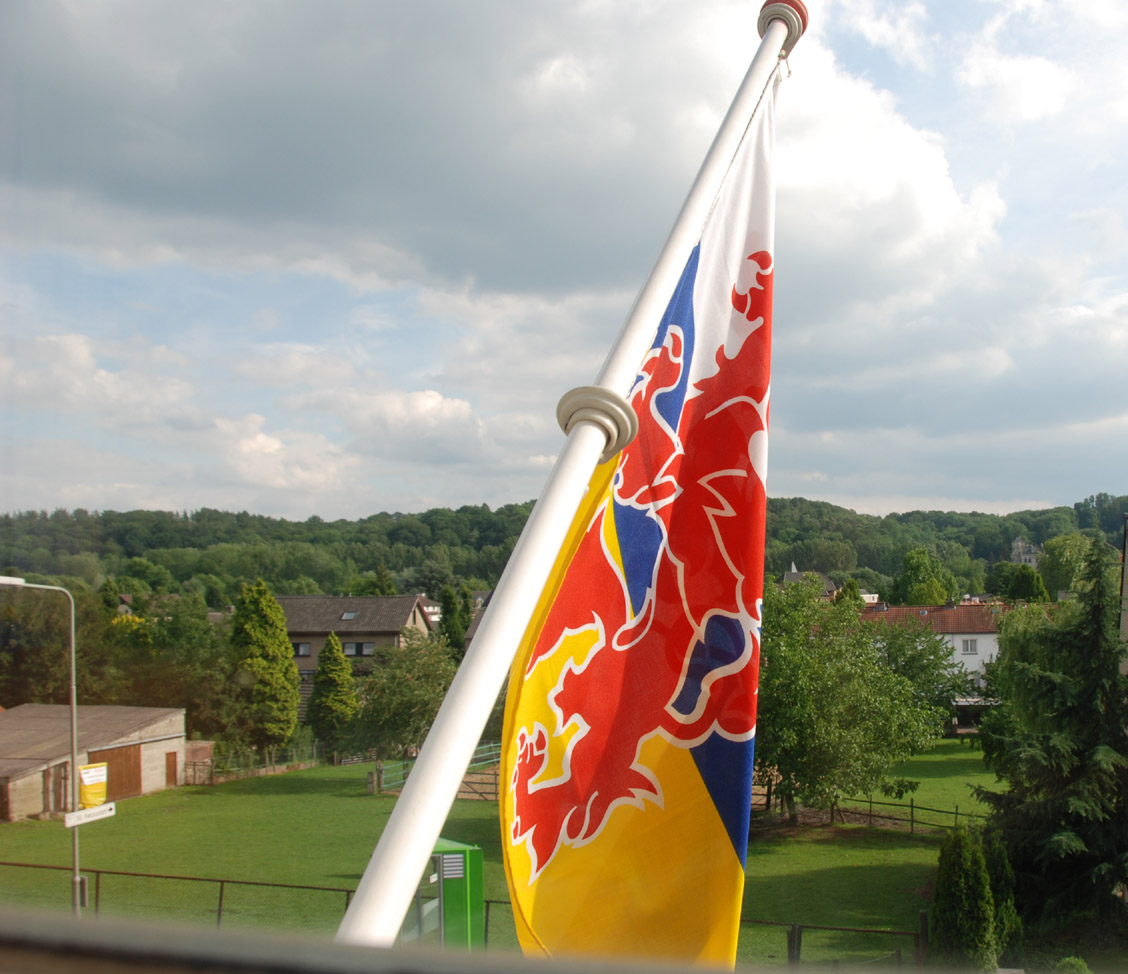
Flag of Limburg

A fearsome-looking red lion with a crown and double tail occupies a central place on the flag. The lion refers to the old Duchy of Limburg and symbolizes the province. As a symbol of honour, strength, pride and courage, the lion has always been in vogue in royal houses, noble families or other institutions seeking to exude authority and authority. The background of the flag is formed by two equals, horizontally positioned stripes of white (top) and yellow (bottom). The stripes are separated by a narrower blue stripe. This symbolizes the Meuse, the largest river flowing through Limburg. The colours yellow and white respectively represent the marl landscapes in southern Limburg and the sandy soils in northern and central Limburg. They are also part of the provincial coat of arms.

This flag is not used in Belgian Limburg, which has its own, different, flag.
