= Flag of Scheveningen =

Flag of village in the Netherlands

Scheveningen
- Use: District flag
- Proportion: 2:3
- Adopted: 23 March 1984
- Design: In azure with three right swimming herrings of silver, each herring with a three-leaved yellow crown, floating above the head.

The flag of Scheveningen is in azure with three right swimming herrings of silver, each herring with a three-leaved yellow crown, floating above the head. The origin of the coat of arms is a matter of debate because Scheveningen is not, and never has been, an autonomous municipality. Since the village was founded in 1284, Scheveningen has always been a part of the municipality of The Hague.

== History ==
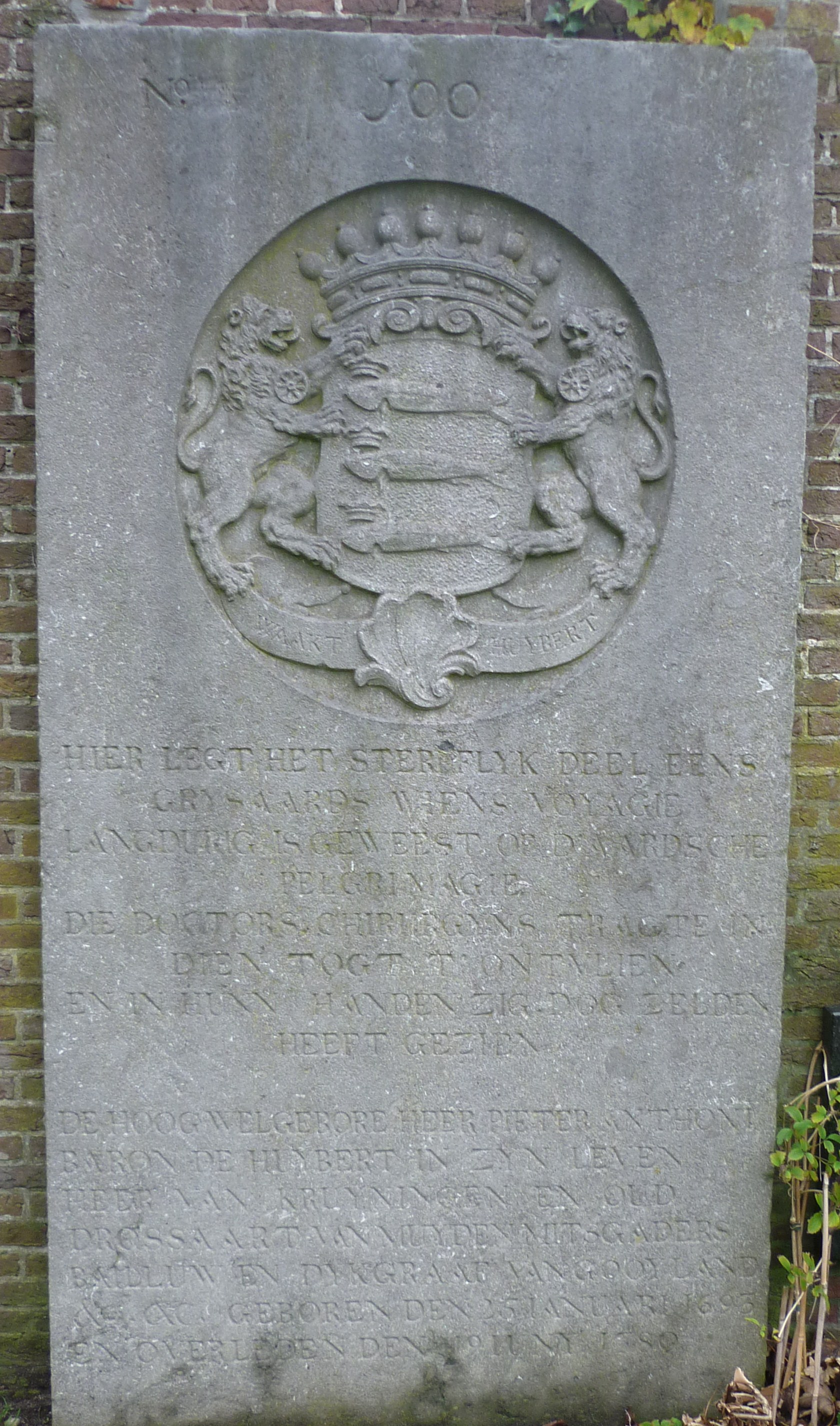
Tombstone dated 1780 of the Baron De Huybert in Ter Navolging cemetery, with the engraved family insigna

The first trace of the coat of arms containing the crowned herrings dates back to the seventeenth century as the coat of arms of the local noble family De Huybert. Nowadays, the family name died out as there are no descendants left.

The first document reporting the coat of arms as the coat of arms of Scheveningen goes back to 1847. On page 165, volume X of the Geographic Dictionary of the Netherlands written by Abraham Jacob van der Aa, it can be read Het oude wapen van SCHEVENINGEN was drie gekroonde harinen, waarvan het veld niet wordt opgegeven. (The ancient coat of arms of SCHEVENINGEN consisted of three crowned herrings where the field [color] is not specified).

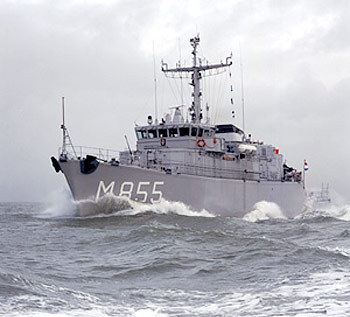
The minehunter Hr. Ms. Scheveningen

In 1984, in occasion of the celebrations of the seven hundredth anniversary of the founding of Scheveningen, the Royal Netherlands Navy assigned the name Hr. Ms. Scheveningen to the minehunter numbered M855. A coat of arms with two crossed herrings and the stork of The Hague was assigned to the ship. In response to some letters of protest sent to the newspapers, a petition and a parliamentary question, the Minister of Defence J. Rider, was forced to change the coat of arms of the Hr. Ms. Scheveningen with the one with the crowned herrings. This story shows us how strong the feeling about the coat of arms is amongst the Scheveningen people, that this is their coat of arms and is part of their tradition.

== Current use ==
The Municipal council of The Hague, recognized, with proposal 136, dated 23 March 1984, that the coat of arms as insigna of the Scheveningen village.

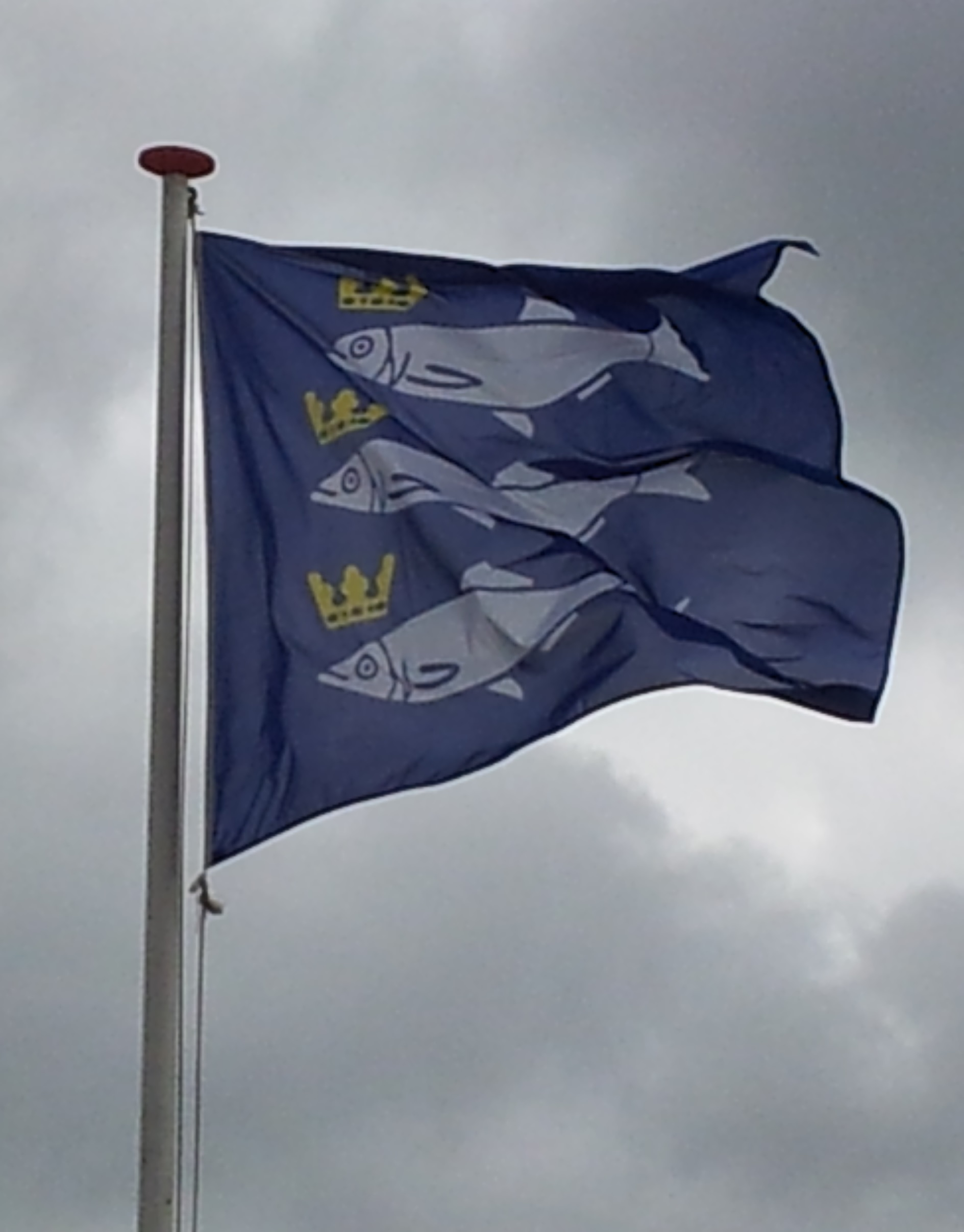
Flag of Scheveningen

Nowadays, the flag is commonly used in Scheveningen. It is possible to see the flag especially during the Vlaggetjesdag (in Dutch, flag day), with the arrival of the Hollandse nieuwe (in Dutch, Hollander new referred to the first soused herrings available of the season). However, the feast name has nothing to do with the flag of Scheveningen but is related to the ships' bunting shown by the fishing boats during Vlaggetjesdag.

Furthermore, the coat of arms is displayed on the bow of all fishing boats registered in Scheveningen port.

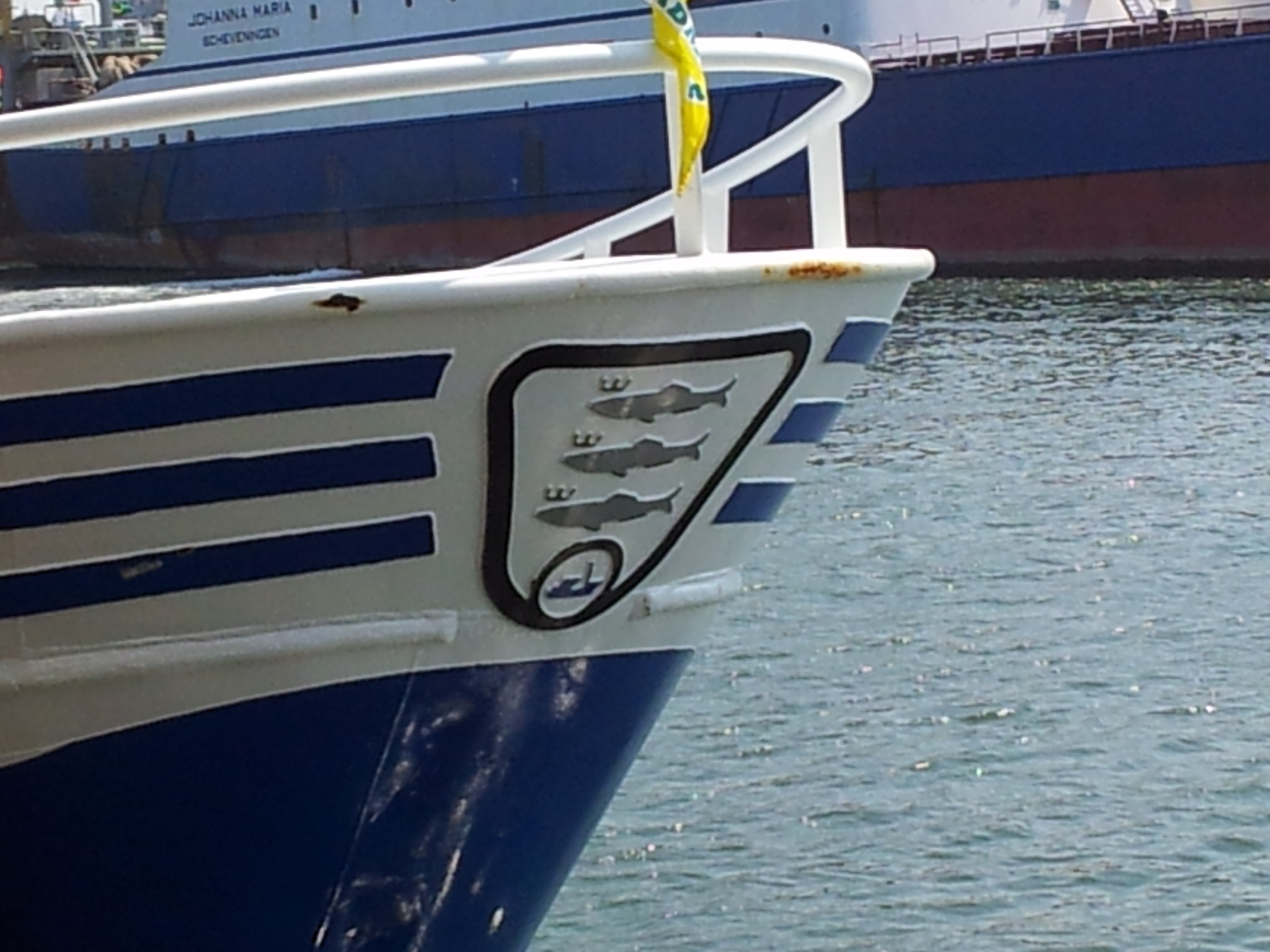
The coat of arms with the crowned herrings on the bow of a fishing boat in Scheveningen
