= Persijn =

Persyn family coat-of-arms

The name Persijn or Persyn originates from what is said to be one of the oldest and noblest families from Kennemerland. In the 13th century, a branch of the Persijn family concerns the lords of Waterland and Amsterdam. They resided in the lost castle of Huis te Velsen north of Haarlem. Its oldest known ancestor was Dirk Persyn, who was given the title of courtier of the Count of Holland in 1162.

== The first Persijn ==
The tradition says the first Persijn is said to have returned from Greece in 990, together with Lutgardis of Luxemburg, the wife of Arnulf, Count of Holland.

== Knight Jan Persijn, lord of Waterland ==
=== The siege of Haarlem ===
In his Chronographia, the chronicler Sir Jan Beke tells the story of the siege of Haarlem by the Kennemers in 1274.

He writes: "Johannes vero de Passijn [corrected in the margin to Johannes de Persyn] inclitus oppidum interea clam exiens vehicula kenemarorum cibarijs onustam comprehendit et exinde plurimas villas hostium capitalium inflammavit".

Which can be translated into: "In the meantime, the famous knight Jan Persijn secretly went out of the city, captured Kennemer vehicles loaded with provisions and after that set several enemy villages on fire".

This led the besiegers to leave the siege and return to their homes. They were chased and defeated by the Haarlemmers.

This victory led Jan Persijn to be praised by his people and as a token of thanks, Jan Persijn was given the title of Lord of Waterland and Marken from the bishop Jan van Nassau.

=== Waterland and Marken ===
He promptly attempted to build a stronghold, the Swanensborch in the city of Monnickendam, in order to generate income from maritime trade.

In 1275, however, the local inhabitants rebelled and soon the Lord Persijn had to destroy its castle.

As a consequence it seems the lord Persijn lost interest in Waterland and sold half of his title to Floris V, Count of Holland, while he gave the other half to his son Nicholaas van Persijn.

=== Death of Jan Persijn ===
He died soon after, on 26 of December 1283.

== The Persijn Family Coat of Arms ==
Flag of the city of Amsterdam

The Persijn Family Coat of Arms is made of six horizontal bars, alternating blue and yellow. On the three yellow (originally gold-colored) bars are respectively 4, 3 and 2, red-colored Saint Andrew's crosses.

The Flag of Amsterdam is said to originate from this coat of arms.
