= Flag of Gelderland =

Dutch provincial flag

Gelderland
- Use: Provincial flag
- Proportion: 9:13≈ (de facto 2:3)
- Adopted: 15 April 1953
- Design: Horizontal tricolour flag in blue, yellow (gold) and black

The flag of Gelderland is a horizontal tricolour of blue, yellow (gold) and black. Gelderland is a province in the Netherlands. The flag was determined on 15 April 1953 by the Provinciale Staten. Its colours originate from the coat of arms of Gelderland, which in turn was based on the coat of arms of the Guelders. The central element of the coat of arms is a shield carried by two lions. The left half shows a golden lion on a blue shield, while the right half shows the black lion of Jülich. The black lion stands out against a gold background.

Coat of arms of Guelders (1379)
