= Flag of Overijssel =

Dutch provincial flag

Overijssel
- Use: Provincial flag
- Proportion: 10:17 (de facto 2:3)
- Adopted: 21 July 1948
- Design: A yellow flag with two red bands in top and bottom, and a blue wavy band in the middle.

The flag of Overijssel is the official flag of the province of Overijssel. The flag consists of two red and yellow stripes along with a blue wave in the middle. It was adopted on 21 July 1948. The current flag is the only one the province has ever had. The yellow and red stripes on the flag are supposed to represent the historical link with the province of Holland. The three colours are, namely, the colours of the coat of arms of Overijssel (a red lion in a golden field charged with a blue fesse wavy). In the centre of the flag, the wavy blue line represents the river IJssel, after which the province is named.

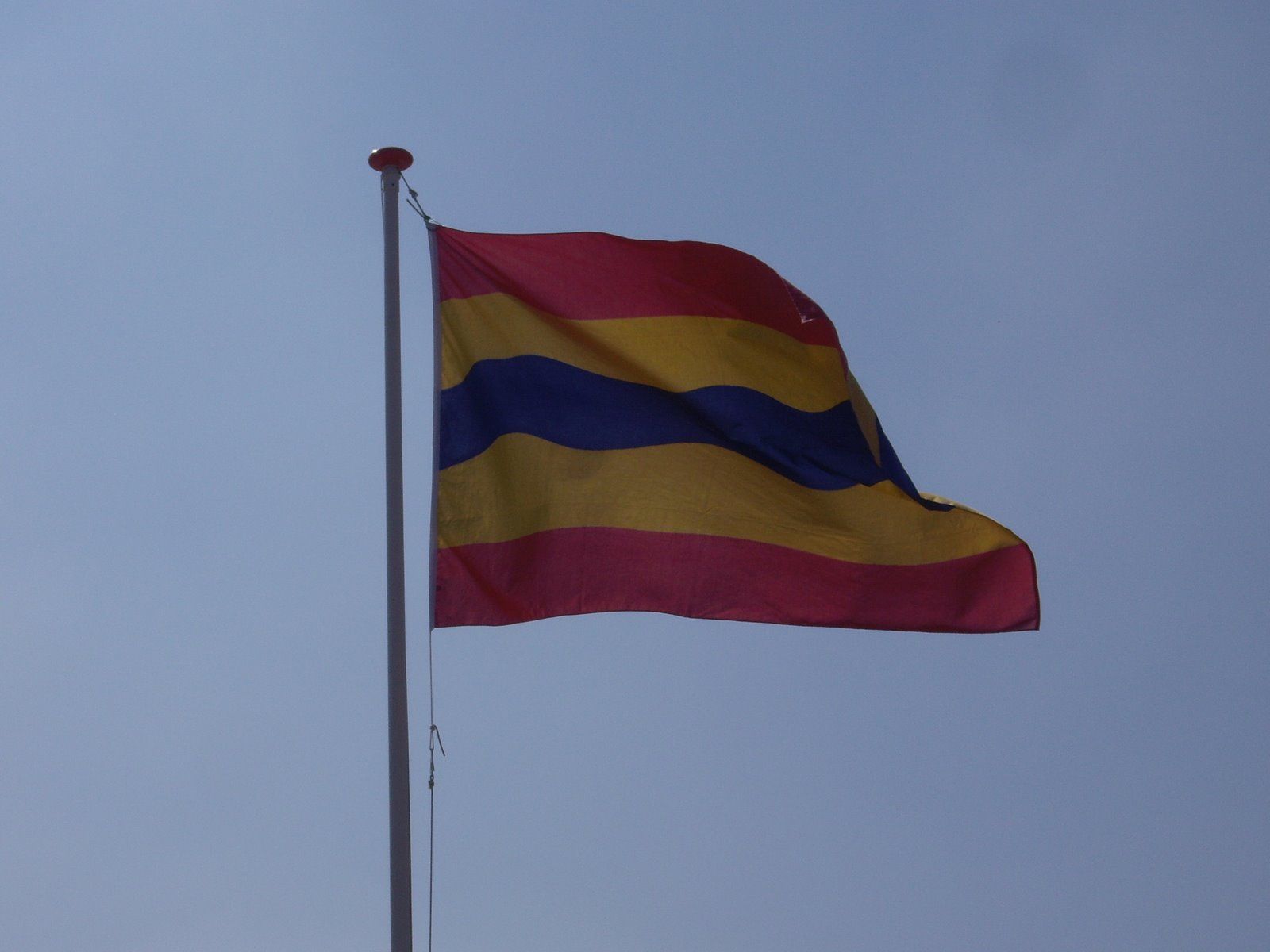
Flag of the Dutch province of Overijssel, flying in the wind.
