= Flag of North Holland =

Dutch provincial flag

North Holland
- Use: Provincial flag
- Proportion: 2:3
- Adopted: 22 October 1958
- Design: Horizontal tricolour flag in yellow, red and blue

The flag of North Holland (Dutch: vlag van Noord-Holland) is the official flag of North Holland. The flag consists of three horizontal bands executed in the colours yellow, red and blue. The colours are taken from the coat of arms of North Holland. This in turn is a combination of the old coats of arms of North Holland and West Friesland. Yellow (actually gold) and red belong to Holland, while blue is part of the West Frisian identity. The current design was adopted by the Provincial Council on 22 October 1958 as the official tricolour of North Holland. The colour sequence of the North Holland flag was also determined this way in the current design because otherwise the flag would look too much like the red-white-blue striping pattern of the Dutch flag.
