= Flag of Drenthe =

Dutch provincial flag

Drenthe
- Use: Provincial flag
- Proportion: 9:13 (de facto 2:3)
- Adopted: 19 February 1947
- Design: A white flag with two horizontal red stripes, between the two stripes there is a black tower and six red stars.
- Designed by: Gerlof Auke Bontekoe

The flag of Drenthe is the official flag of the Dutch province of Drenthe and was adopted on 19 February 1947. This flag was designed by Gerlof Auke Bontekoe. The traditional Saxon colours of red and white form the basis of the design. They also link it to the Archdiocese of Utrecht, which administered Drenthe when the area was still part of the Oversticht. Between the white base colour and the two red bands are six red stars and a black tower. The stars represent the districts Zuidenveld, Oostenmoer, Noordenveld, Rolde, Beilen and Diever. The tower is a historical reference to Coevorden Castle. From this castle, the viscounts of Coevorden maintained the law in the name of the bishop of Utrecht for a long time.
