= Frans Koppelaar =

Dutch classical painter

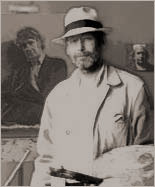
- Self portrait of Frans Koppelaar
- Born: Frans Thomas Koppelaar; April 23, 1943 (age 83); The Hague, Reichskommissariat Niederlande
- Known for: Painting, Landscape art

Frans Thomas Koppelaar (born April 23, 1943) is a Dutch painter, who was born in The Hague, Netherlands.

From 1963 to 1969, he attended the Royal Academy of Visual Arts at The Hague. He moved to Amsterdam in 1968.

His landscapes and Amsterdam cityscapes are painted in a style that recalls the classical tradition of the Hague School and the Amsterdam Impressionists.

Koppelaar's work is part of a figurative movement in Dutch contemporary painting that evolved during the 1990s in a reaction to the pared-down conceptual art and the art theories of that period. Through the years his style evolved into a simpler, straightforward approach. By 1984, he no longer identified himself with any art movement.

Koppelaar is also known as a portraitist.

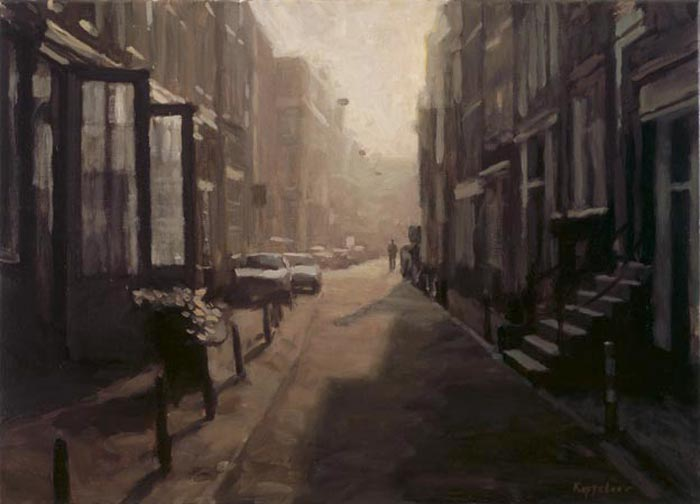
Backlight Langestraat (1993) oil on canvas

== Bibliography ==
- Brunt, Ineke & Eisema, Joan (2004), "Gegrepen door het moment - Amsterdam in olieverf" ("Grasped by the moment - Amsterdam in oils"), Stichting de Heeren Keyser ISBN 90-808649-3-5
- "Amsterdam Urban Landscapes from the Meentwijck Collection" (2003), Auction House Christie's, Amsterdam
- Denninger, Carole (2008), "Amsterdam 365 Stadsgezichten", THOTH, Bussum NL ISBN 978-90-6868-490-2
