= Flag of North Brabant =

Dutch provincial flag

North Brabant
- Use: Provincial flag
- Proportion: 2:3
- Adopted: 21 January 1959
- Design: The flag consists of a chequy pattern alternatively in red and white

The flag of North Brabant (Dutch: Vlag van Noord-Brabant) is the official flag of the Dutch province of North Brabant. It consists of a chequy pattern with 24 distinct fields in the colours red and white (Heraldry: gules and argent). The flag has been used since the Middle Ages, but fell into disuse in the 18th century. The flag is now back in use, and has been the official flag of North Brabant since 1959.

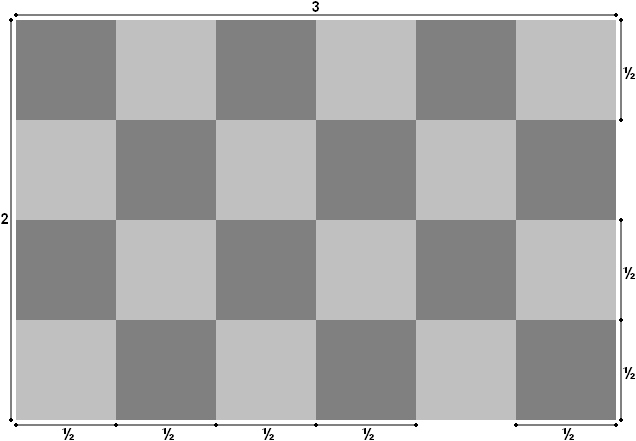

The flag was adopted by the Provincial Council on January 21, 1959. In addition, the following description was used: "Rectangular, consisting of four horizontal stripes, divided into six adjacent surfaces of red and white and six vertical lines, divided into four adjacent sides of red and white."

The coat of arms of Croatia and the flag of the Belgian province of Antwerp make use of the same pattern, but the flag of Antwerp makes use of the colours red, white, blue and yellow.

== History ==
The North Brabantian flag dates from the Middle Ages. The colours red and white have been used in Brabantian standards, flags, and pennants since the proclamation of the County of Louvain (942 CE) during the Lotharingian period. Later, the Duchy of Brabant took these colours on. During the Middle Ages and the centuries after, the red and white would often be used. Ships sailed under a red-white flag, especially in Antwerp. At the end of the 18th century, the flag fell into disuse, only to come back in the 20th century.

== Highest seniority ==
The North Brabant flag has the highest seniority among all Dutch province flags. For that reason, it hung immediately to the right of the throne of the monarch in the Ridderzaal until 2006. On official occasions, the flag is always on the very left side for the spectators. As of Prinsjesdag 2006, the flags in the Ridderzaal were replaced by tapestries bearing the provincial coat of arms.

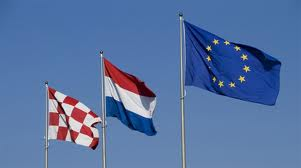
From left to right: The flag of North Brabant, The Netherlands and The European Union
