= Flag of Groningen (province) =

Dutch provincial flag

Groningen
- Use: Provincial flag
- Proportion: 2:3
- Adopted: 17 February 1950
- Design: A flag with a green cross fimbriated in white, and red in the first and fourth quarter, blue in the second and third quarter.
- Designed by: Jan Tuin

The flag of Groningen is an official symbol of the province. The flag was officially adopted on 17 February 1950, and it consists of a fimbriated green cross surrounded by two red and two blue quarters. The design combines elements and colours of the arms of Ommelanden (red, white and blue) and the city of Groningen (green and white). It is no coincidence that Groningen's city colours form a cross at the heart of the flag. In fact, that placement in the centre symbolizes the central location of the city of Groningen in the province. Because of the cross, the flag can also be associated with flags of Nordic countries with which Groningen had trade relations in the past.

== Design ==
The ratio of the flag is 2:3, the same as the Dutch flag. The white cross has the width of 1/3 of the height of the flag and the green cross 1/9 of the flag height. The colors are defined as the Pantone-colors 032U (red), 300U (blue) and 355U (green).

== History ==
In the year 1913 Van der Laars did a proposal to use a flag for the province of Groningen. His proposal was a flag that was based upon the flag of the Ommelanden. The blue stripe in the middle was altered to the green of the flag from the city of Groningen. He also did two other proposals where he used the colors of the coat-of-arms of the province of Groningen.

The flag of the Ommelanden

The flag of the city of Groningen

Proposal 1

Proposal 2

Proposal 3

The design of the current flag was made by Jan Tuin, member of the Gedeputeerde Staten of the province of Groningen and later mayor of the city of Groningen. They couldn't agree upon which flag would become the flag of the province. Jan Tuin proposed to design a new flag, this design was accepted. On 17 February 1950 it was decided by Gedeputeerde Staten that this would become the flag of the province of Groningen. Six days later the ruling was officially published.
