= Armorial of the Netherlands =

This is an armorial of the Kingdom of the Netherlands.

== Kingdom of the Netherlands ==
The different versions of Coat of arms of the Netherlands are shown here:

Greater (Royal) version

Middle (State) version

Lesser version

== Countries ==
The coats of arms of the countries of the Kingdom of the Netherlands are shown here:

Coat of arms of Aruba

Coat of arms of Curaçao

Coat of arms of the Netherlands

Coat of arms of Sint Maarten

== Provinces ==
The coats of arms of the twelve provinces of the Netherlands are shown here:

Coat of arms of Drenthe

Coat of arms of Flevoland

Coat of arms of Friesland

Coat of arms of Gelderland

Coat of arms of Groningen

Coat of arms of Limburg

Coat of arms of North Brabant

Coat of arms of North Holland

Coat of arms of Overijssel

Coat of arms of South Holland

Coat of arms of Utrecht

Coat of arms of Zeeland

== Public bodies ==
The coats of arms of the three public bodies of the Caribbean Netherlands are shown here:

Coat of arms of Bonaire

Coat of arms of Saba

Coat of arms of Sint Eustatius

== Municipalities ==
The coats of arms of the 342 municipalities of the Netherlands are shown here: The coats of arms are listed per province.

=== Drenthe ===
Coat of arms of Aa en Hunze

Coat of arms of Assen

Coat of arms of Borger-Odoorn

Coat of arms of Coevorden

Coat of arms of De Wolden

Coat of arms of Emmen

Coat of arms of Hoogeveen

Coat of arms of Meppel

Coat of arms of Midden-Drenthe

Coat of arms of Noordenveld

Coat of arms of Tynaarlo

Coat of arms of Westerveld

=== Flevoland ===
Coat of arms of Almere

Coat of arms of Dronten

Coat of arms of Lelystad

Coat of arms of Noordoostpolder

Coat of arms of Urk

Coat of arms of Zeewolde

=== Friesland ===
Coat of arms of Achtkarspelen

Coat of arms of Ameland

Coat of arms of Dantumadiel

Coat of arms of De Fryske Marren

Coat of arms of Harlingen

Coat of arms of Heerenveen

Coat of arms of Leeuwarden

Coat of arms of Noardeast-Fryslân

Coat of arms of Ooststellingwerf

Coat of arms of Opsterland

Coat of arms of Schiermonnikoog

Coat of arms of Smallingerland

Coat of arms of Súdwest-Fryslân

Coat of arms of Terschelling

Coat of arms of Tytsjerksteradiel

Coat of arms of Vlieland

Coat of arms of Waadhoeke

Coat of arms of Weststellingwerf

=== Gelderland ===
Coat of arms of Aalten

Coat of arms of Apeldoorn

Coat of arms of Arnhem

Coat of arms of Barneveld

Coat of arms of Berg en Dal

Coat of arms of Berkelland

Coat of arms of Beuningen

Coat of arms of Bronckhorst

Coat of arms of Brummen

Coat of arms of Buren

Coat of arms of Culemborg

Coat of arms of Doesburg

Coat of arms of Doetinchem

Coat of arms of Druten

Coat of arms of Duiven

Coat of arms of Ede

Coat of arms of Elburg

Coat of arms of Epe

Coat of arms of Ermelo

Coat of arms of Harderwijk

Coat of arms of Hattem

Coat of arms of Heerde

Coat of arms of Heumen

Coat of arms of Lingewaard

Coat of arms of Lochem

Coat of arms of Maasdriel

Coat of arms of Montferland

Coat of arms of Neder-Betuwe

Coat of arms of Nijkerk

Coat of arms of Nijmegen

Coat of arms of Nunspeet

Coat of arms of Oldebroek

Coat of arms of Oost Gelre

Coat of arms of Oude IJsselstreek

Coat of arms of Overbetuwe

Coat of arms of Putten

Coat of arms of Renkum

Coat of arms of Rheden

Coat of arms of Rozendaal

Coat of arms of Scherpenzeel

Coat of arms of Tiel

Coat of arms of Voorst

Coat of arms of Wageningen

Coat of arms of West Betuwe

Coat of arms of West Maas en Waal

Coat of arms of Westervoort

Coat of arms of Wijchen

Coat of arms of Winterswijk

Coat of arms of Zaltbommel

Coat of arms of Zevenaar

Coat of arms of Zutphen

=== Groningen ===
Coat of arms of Eemsdelta

Coat of arms of Groningen

Coat of arms of Het Hogeland

Coat of arms of Midden-Groningen

Coat of arms of Oldambt

Coat of arms of Pekela

Coat of arms of Stadskanaal

Coat of arms of Veendam

Coat of arms of Westerkwartier

Coat of arms of Westerwolde

=== Limburg ===
Coat of arms of Beek

Coat of arms of Beekdaelen

Coat of arms of Beesel

Coat of arms of Bergen

Coat of arms of Brunssum

Coat of arms of Echt-Susteren

Coat of arms of Eijsden-Margraten

Coat of arms of Gennep

Coat of arms of Gulpen-Wittem

Coat of arms of Heerlen

Coat of arms of Horst aan de Maas

Coat of arms of Kerkrade

Coat of arms of Landgraaf

Coat of arms of Leudal

Coat of arms of Maasgouw

Coat of arms of Maastricht

Coat of arms of Meerssen

Coat of arms of Mook en Middelaar

Coat of arms of Nederweert

Coat of arms of Peel en Maas

Coat of arms of Roerdalen

Coat of arms of Roermond

Coat of arms of Simpelveld

Coat of arms of Sittard-Geleen

Coat of arms of Stein

Coat of arms of Vaals

Coat of arms of Valkenburg aan de Geul

Coat of arms of Venlo

Coat of arms of Venray

Coat of arms of Voerendaal

Coat of arms of Weert

=== North Brabant ===
Coat of arms of Alphen-Chaam

Coat of arms of Altena

Coat of arms of Asten

Coat of arms of Baarle-Nassau

Coat of arms of Bergeijk

Coat of arms of Bergen op Zoom

Coat of arms of Bernheze

Coat of arms of Best

Coat of arms of Bladel

Coat of arms of Boekel

Coat of arms of Boxtel

Coat of arms of Breda

Coat of arms of Cranendonck

Coat of arms of Deurne

Coat of arms of Dongen

Coat of arms of Drimmelen

Coat of arms of Eersel

Coat of arms of Eindhoven

Coat of arms of Etten-Leur

Coat of arms of Geertruidenberg

Coat of arms of Geldrop-Mierlo

Coat of arms of Gemert-Bakel

Coat of arms of Gilze en Rijen

Coat of arms of Goirle

Coat of arms of Halderberge

Coat of arms of Heeze-Leende

Coat of arms of Helmond

Coat of arms of 's-Hertogenbosch

Coat of arms of Heusden

Coat of arms of Hilvarenbeek

Coat of arms of Laarbeek

Coat of arms of Land van Cuijk

Coat of arms of Loon op Zand

Coat of arms of Maashorst

Coat of arms of Meierijstad

Coat of arms of Moerdijk

Coat of arms of Nuenen, Gerwen en Nederwetten

Coat of arms of Oirschot

Coat of arms of Oisterwijk

Coat of arms of Oosterhout

Coat of arms of Oss

Coat of arms of Reusel-De Mierden

Coat of arms of Roosendaal

Coat of arms of Rucphen

Coat of arms of Sint-Michielsgestel

Coat of arms of Someren

Coat of arms of Son en Breugel

Coat of arms of Steenbergen

Coat of arms of Tilburg

Coat of arms of Valkenswaard

Coat of arms of Veldhoven

Coat of arms of Vught

Coat of arms of Waalre

Coat of arms of Waalwijk

Coat of arms of Woensdrecht

Coat of arms of Zundert

=== North Holland ===
Coat of arms of Aalsmeer

Coat of arms of Alkmaar

Coat of arms of Amstelveen

Coat of arms of Amsterdam

Coat of arms of Bergen

Coat of arms of Beverwijk

Coat of arms of Blaricum

Coat of arms of Bloemendaal

Coat of arms of Castricum

Coat of arms of Den Helder

Coat of arms of Diemen

Coat of arms of Dijk en Waard

Coat of arms of Drechterland

Coat of arms of Edam-Volendam

Coat of arms of Enkhuizen

Coat of arms of Gooise Meren

Coat of arms of Haarlem

Coat of arms of Haarlemmermeer

Coat of arms of Heemskerk

Coat of arms of Heemstede

Coat of arms of Heiloo

Coat of arms of Hilversum

Coat of arms of Hollands Kroon

Coat of arms of Hoorn

Coat of arms of Huizen

Coat of arms of Koggenland

Coat of arms of Landsmeer

Coat of arms of Laren

Coat of arms of Medemblik

Coat of arms of Oostzaan

Coat of arms of Opmeer

Coat of arms of Ouder-Amstel

Coat of arms of Purmerend

Coat of arms of Schagen

Coat of arms of Stede Broec

Coat of arms of Texel

Coat of arms of Uitgeest

Coat of arms of Uithoorn

Coat of arms of Velsen

Coat of arms of Waterland

Coat of arms of Wijdemeren

Coat of arms of Wormerland

Coat of arms of Zaanstad

Coat of arms of Zandvoort

=== Overijssel ===
Coat of arms of Almelo

Coat of arms of Borne

Coat of arms of Dalfsen

Coat of arms of Deventer

Coat of arms of Dinkelland

Coat of arms of Enschede

Coat of arms of Haaksbergen

Coat of arms of Hardenberg

Coat of arms of Hellendoorn

Coat of arms of Hengelo

Coat of arms of Hof van Twente

Coat of arms of Kampen

Coat of arms of Losser

Coat of arms of Oldenzaal

Coat of arms of Olst-Wijhe

Coat of arms of Ommen

Coat of arms of Raalte

Coat of arms of Rijssen-Holten

Coat of arms of Staphorst

Coat of arms of Steenwijkerland

Coat of arms of Tubbergen

Coat of arms of Twenterand

Coat of arms of Wierden

Coat of arms of Zwartewaterland

Coat of arms of Zwolle

=== South Holland ===
Coat of arms of Alblasserdam

Coat of arms of Albrandswaard

Coat of arms of Alphen aan den Rijn

Coat of arms of Barendrecht

Coat of arms of Bodegraven-Reeuwijk

Coat of arms of Capelle aan den IJssel

Coat of arms of Delft

Coat of arms of Dordrecht

Coat of arms of Goeree-Overflakkee

Coat of arms of Gorinchem

Coat of arms of Gouda

Coat of arms of Hardinxveld-Giessendam

Coat of arms of Hendrik-Ido-Ambacht

Coat of arms of Hillegom

Coat of arms of Hoeksche Waard

Coat of arms of Kaag en Braassem

Coat of arms of Katwijk

Coat of arms of Krimpen aan den IJssel

Coat of arms of Krimpenerwaard

Coat of arms of Lansingerland

Coat of arms of Leiden

Coat of arms of Leiderdorp

Coat of arms of Leidschendam-Voorburg

Coat of arms of Lisse

Coat of arms of Maassluis

Coat of arms of Midden-Delfland

Coat of arms of Molenlanden

Coat of arms of Nieuwkoop

Coat of arms of Nissewaard

Coat of arms of Noordwijk

Coat of arms of Oegstgeest

Coat of arms of Papendrecht

Coat of arms of Pijnacker-Nootdorp

Coat of arms of Ridderkerk

Coat of arms of Rijswijk

Coat of arms of Rotterdam

Coat of arms of Schiedam

Coat of arms of Sliedrecht

Coat of arms of Teylingen

Coat of arms of The Hague

Coat of arms of Vlaardingen

Coat of arms of Voorne aan Zee

Coat of arms of Voorschoten

Coat of arms of Waddinxveen

Coat of arms of Wassenaar

Coat of arms of Westland

Coat of arms of Zoetermeer

Coat of arms of Zoeterwoude

Coat of arms of Zuidplas

Coat of arms of Zwijndrecht

=== Utrecht ===
Coat of arms of Amersfoort

Coat of arms of Baarn

Coat of arms of Bunnik

Coat of arms of Bunschoten

Coat of arms of De Bilt

Coat of arms of De Ronde Venen

Coat of arms of Eemnes

Coat of arms of Houten

Coat of arms of IJsselstein

Coat of arms of Leusden

Coat of arms of Lopik

Coat of arms of Montfoort

Coat of arms of Nieuwegein

Coat of arms of Oudewater

Coat of arms of Renswoude

Coat of arms of Rhenen

Coat of arms of Soest

Coat of arms of Stichtse Vecht

Coat of arms of Utrecht

Coat of arms of Utrechtse Heuvelrug

Coat of arms of Veenendaal

Coat of arms of Vijfheerenlanden

Coat of arms of Wijk bij Duurstede

Coat of arms of Woerden

Coat of arms of Woudenberg

Coat of arms of Zeist

=== Zeeland ===
Coat of arms of Borsele

Coat of arms of Goes

Coat of arms of Hulst

Coat of arms of Kapelle

Coat of arms of Middelburg

Coat of arms of Noord-Beveland

Coat of arms of Reimerswaal

Coat of arms of Schouwen-Duiveland

Coat of arms of Sluis

Coat of arms of Terneuzen

Coat of arms of Tholen

Coat of arms of Veere

Coat of arms of Vlissingen

== Water boards ==
The coats of arms of the twenty-one water boards of the Netherlands are shown here:

Coat of arms of Aa en Maas

Coat of arms of Amstel, Gooi en Vecht

Coat of arms of Brabantse Delta

Coat of arms of Delfland

Coat of arms of De Dommel

Coat of arms of Drents Overijsselse Delta

Coat of arms of Wetterskip Fryslân

Coat of arms of Hollands Noorderkwartier

Coat of arms of Hollandse Delta

Coat of arms of Hunze en Aa's

Coat of arms of Waterschap Limburg

Coat of arms of Noorderzijlvest

Coat of arms of Rijn en IJssel

Coat of arms of Rijnland

Coat of arms of Rivierenland

Coat of arms of Scheldestromen

Coat of arms of Schieland en de Krimpenerwaard

Coat of arms of De Stichtse Rijnlanden

Coat of arms of Vallei en Veluwe

Coat of arms of Vechtstromen

Coat of arms of Zuiderzeeland

== Dioceses ==
The coats of arms of the seven catholic dioceses of the Netherlands are shown here:

Coat of arms of the Archdiocese of Utrecht

Coat of arms of the Diocese of Breda

Coat of arms of the Diocese of Groningen-Leeuwarden

Coat of arms of the Diocese of Haarlem–Amsterdam

Coat of arms of the Diocese of 's-Hertogenbosch

Coat of arms of the Diocese of Roermond

Coat of arms of the Diocese of Rotterdam

== Dutch royal family ==
Members of the Dutch royal family receive their own personalised arms which are based on the royal arms.

Coat of arms of Queen Máxima

Coat of arms of the children of Willem-Alexander
(Princesses Catharina-Amalia, Alexia and Ariane)

Coat of arms of the children of Beatrix
(Prince Constantijn)

Coat of arms of Beatrix

Coat of arms of the children of Juliana
(Princesses Irene, Margriet and Christina)

Coat of arms of the children of Margriet
(Princes Maurits, Bernhard, Pieter-Christiaan and Floris)

== Legislatures ==
The different versions used by the legislature and its chambers are shown here:

Coat of arms of the States General

Coat of arms of the Senate

Coat of arms of the House of Representatives

== Military ==
Emblem of the Royal Netherlands Air Force

Emblem of the Royal Netherlands Army

Emblem of the Royal Marechaussee

Emblem of the Royal Netherlands Navy

=== Royal Netherlands Air and Space Force ===
Coat of arms of the Volkel Air Base

Coat of arms of the Leeuwarden Air Base

Coat of arms of the Air Operations Control Station Nieuw-Milligen

Coat of arms of the Eindhoven Air Base

Coat of arms of the Defense Helicopter Command

Coat of arms of the Air and Space Force Reserve Group

Coat of arms of the Royal Netherlands Air and Space Force Military School-Woensdrecht Air Base

Coat of arms of the Woensdrecht Logistic Centre

Coat of arms of the People and Aviation Centre

=== Royal Netherlands Army ===
Coat of arms of the Land Forces Headquarters

Coat of arms of the 11th Airmobile Brigade

Coat of arms of the 13th Light Brigade

Coat of arms of the 43rd Mechanized Brigade

Coat of arms of the Korps Commandotroepen

Coat of arms of I German/Dutch Corps

Coat of arms of the Joint Ground-based Air Defence Command

Coat of arms of the Operational Support Command Land

Coat of arms of the Instruction and Training Command

Coat of arms of the National Reserve Corps

=== Royal Netherlands Navy ===
Coat of arms of the Dutch Caribbean Coast Guard

Coat of arms of the Netherlands Marine Corps

Coat of arms of the Netherlands Maritime Special Operations Forces

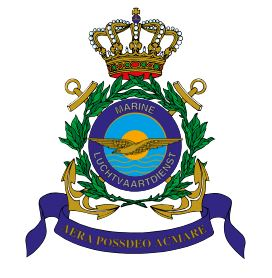
Coat of arms of the Netherlands Naval Aviation Service

Coat of arms of the Royal Netherlands Navy Submarine Service

=== Others ===
Coat of arms of the Materiel and IT Command

== Historical ==
Coat of arms of the Dutch Republic

Great Seal of the Batavian Republic

Coat of arms of the Kingdom of Holland

Coat of arms of the Sovereign Principality of the United Netherlands

Coat of arms of the United Kingdom of the Netherlands

Coat of arms of the Netherlands Antilles (1964–1986)

Coat of arms of the Netherlands Antilles (1986–2010)

Coat of arms of Dutch Brazil

Coat of arms of Dutch New Guinea

== See also ==
- List of flags of the Netherlands
- Flags of the Dutch royal family
- Flags of the provinces of the Netherlands
- List of municipal flags of the Netherlands
