= Armorial of dependent territories =

This gallery shows the coat of arms (or an emblem serving a similar purpose) of each of the dependent territories in the list of countries.

== Australia ==
=== External territories ===
Coat of arms of Norfolk Island

== Chile ==
=== Municipalities ===
Emblem of Easter Island

Coat of arms of the Juan Fernández Islands

== People's Republic of China ==
=== Special Administrative Regions ===
Emblem of Hong Kong

Emblem of Macau

== Denmark ==
=== Autonomous Countries ===
Coat of arms of the Faroe Islands

Coat of arms of Greenland

== Finland ==
=== Autonomous Region ===
Coat of arms of Åland

== France ==
=== Overseas departments ===
Coat of arms of French Guiana

Coat of arms of Mayotte

Coat of arms of Réunion

=== Overseas collectivities and territories ===
Coat of arms of French Polynesia

Coat of arms of the French Southern and Antarctic Lands

Emblem of New Caledonia

Coat of arms of Saint Barthélemy

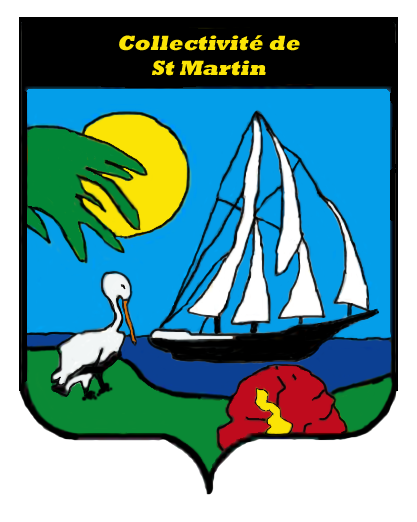
Coat of arms of Saint Martin

Coat of arms of Saint Pierre and Miquelon

== Netherlands ==
=== Self-governing constituent countries (Overseas) ===
Coat of arms of Aruba

Coat of arms of Curaçao

Coat of arms of Sint Maarten

=== Public Bodies ===
Coat of arms of Bonaire

Coat of arms of Saba

Coat of arms of Sint Eustatius

== New Zealand ==
=== Associated countries ===
Coat of arms of the Cook Islands

Coat of arms of Niue

=== Territories ===
National Badge of Tokelau

== Philippines ==
Seal of Bangsamoro

== Portugal ==
=== Autonomous regions ===
Coat of Arms of the Azores

Coat of Arms of Madeira

== Spain ==
=== Autonomous cities ===
Coat of Arms of Ceuta

Coat of Arms of Melilla

=== Autonomous communities ===
Coat of Arms of Canary Islands

=== Plazas de soberanía ===
Coat of arms of the Chafarinas Islands

== United Kingdom ==
=== Crown Dependencies ===
Coat of arms of Guernsey

Coat of arms of Alderney (part of the Bailiwick of Guernsey)

Coat of arms of Herm (part of the Bailiwick of Guernsey)

Coat of arms of Sark (part of the Bailiwick of Guernsey)

Coat of arms of Jersey

Coat of arms of the Isle of Man

=== Overseas Territories ===
Coat of arms of Anguilla

Coat of arms of Ascension Island

Coat of arms of Bermuda

Coat of arms of the British Antarctic Territory

Coat of arms of the British Virgin Islands

Coat of arms of the Cayman Islands

Coat of arms of the Falkland Islands

Coat of arms of Gibraltar

Coat of arms of Montserrat

Coat of arms of the Pitcairn Islands

Coat of arms of Saint Helena

Coat of arms of South Georgia and the South Sandwich Islands

Coat of arms of Tristan da Cunha

Coat of arms of the Turks and Caicos Islands

== United States ==
=== Unincorporated territories ===
Seal of American Samoa

Seal of the American Virgin Islands

Seal of Guam

Seal of the Northern Mariana Islands

Coat of arms of Puerto Rico

Great Seal of Puerto Rico

== See also ==
- Armorial of sovereign states
- List of national flags of sovereign states
- Gallery of flags of dependent territories
