= Coat of arms of Curaçao =

- Armiger: Country of Curaçao
- Adopted: 24 July 1964; 61 years ago
- Shield: Party per pale, first argent a sailboat proper in full sail on a sea azure, second argent a laraha vert on a mount in base of the same, overall a inescutcheon gules a pale sable three saltorels argent

The coat of arms of Curaçao is the national symbol of Curaçao. Adopted on 24 July 1964, it consists of a divided shield with a crown. The coat of arms was set to be replaced by a national emblem following a design competition in 2022. However, the adoption of the emblem was canceled due to allegations of plagiarism against the winning design.

== History ==
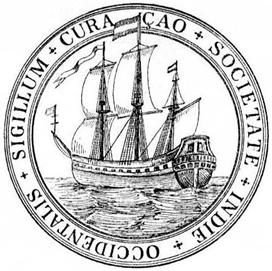
Former seal of Curaçao

=== Seal of Curaçao (1795–1964) ===
Before 1964, the coats of arms of the Netherlands, and later, the Netherlands Antilles were used on Curaçao, as it did not have a coat of arms of its own. As an alternative, a modified version of the seal of the Dutch West India Company (GWC) was adopted in 1795 as the seal of Curaçao. It featured a sailing ship surrounded by the Latin text: Sigillum Curaçao Societate Indie Occidentalis.

=== Coat of arms of Curaçao (1964–present) ===
The design for the coat of arms of Curaçao was proposed by the High Council of Nobility in 1964, when Curaçao was still an island territory of the Netherlands Antilles. It depicts a sailing ship of the WIC and a laraha (bitter orange), as well as the coat of arms of Amsterdam as an inescutcheon. The design symbolizes Curaçao's history and connection with the House of Orange-Nassau and the city of Amsterdam. The adoption of the coat of arms led to criticism from, among others, the Democratic Party due to its references to the island's colonial period.

The coat of arms is blazoned as: Party per pale, first argent a sailboat proper in full sail on a sea azure, second argent a laraha vert on a mount in base of the same, overall an inescutcheon gules a pale sable three saltorels argent.

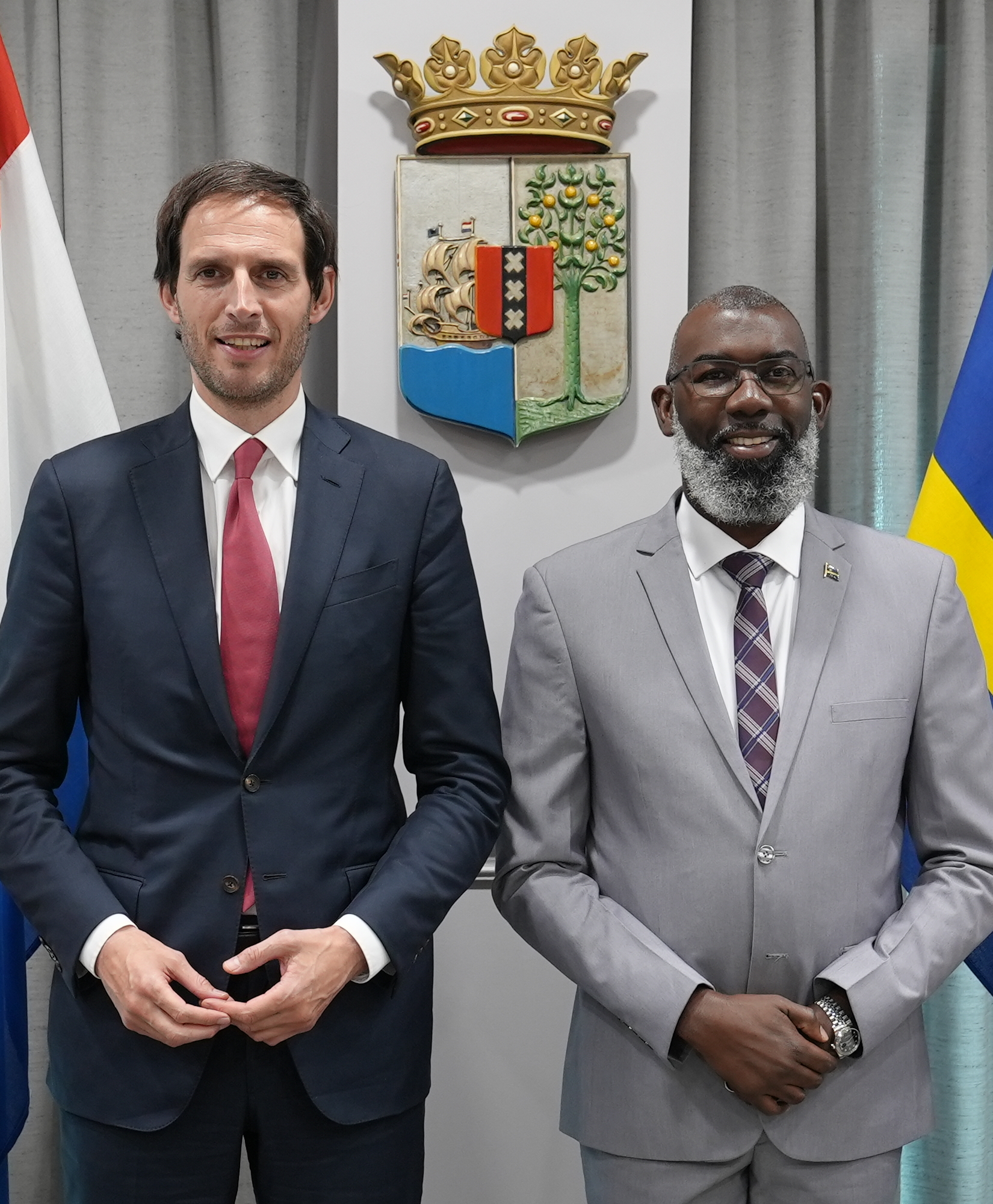
Wopke Hoekstra and Gilmar Pisas posing before the coat of arms of Curaçao.

== Replacement attempt ==
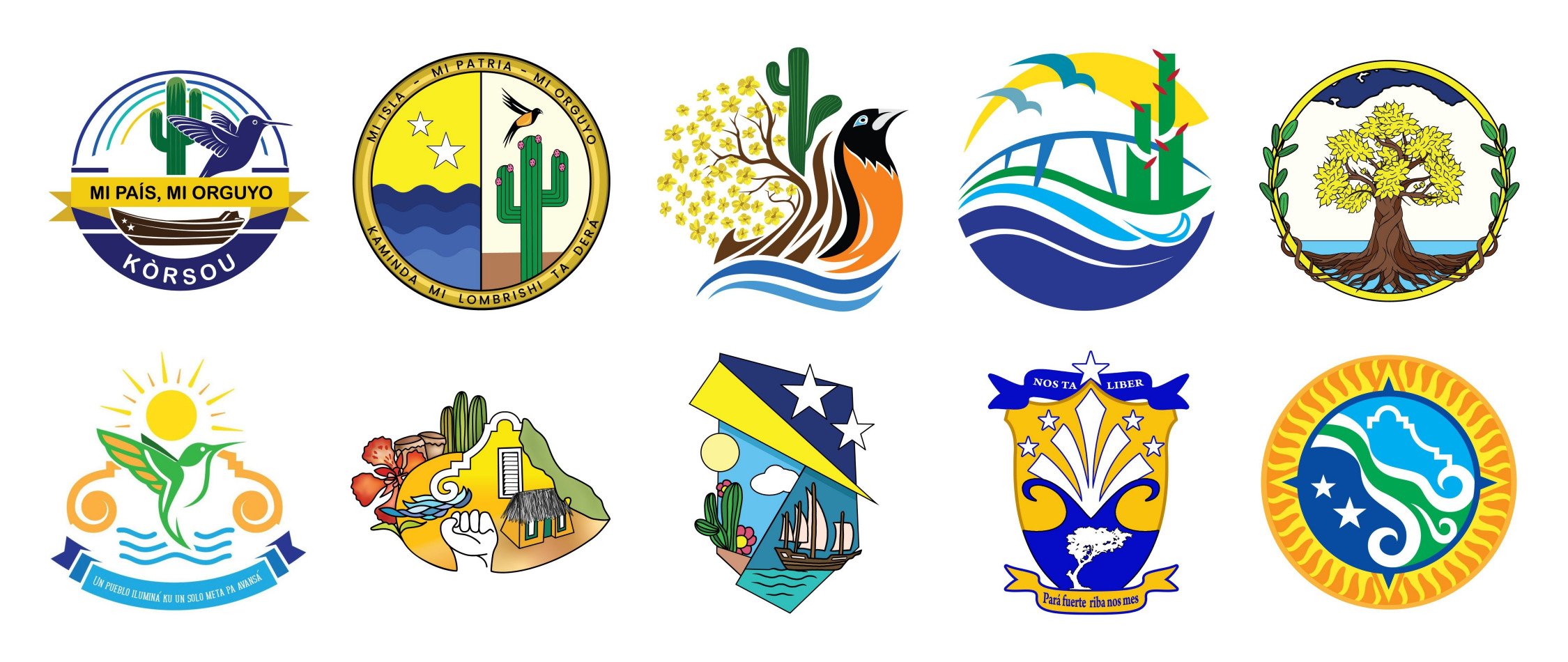
Top 10 of designs selected by the committee of experts (in random order)

On 23 December 2020, ten years after the dissolution of the Netherlands Antilles, the Rhuggenaath cabinet decided that the coat of arms needed to be replaced by a new design to promote nation-building. On 4 July 2022, a design competition was launched for a new emblem to replace the coat of arms. Designs could be submitted from 20 July to 19 August 2022, after which they were evaluated by a committee of experts. One of the requirements was that the motto had to be in Papiamentu.

A total of 205 designs were submitted to the competition. From 20 to 30 September 2022, the public could vote for their favorite out of ten designs selected by the committee. The winning design was revealed on 10 October 2022 by Prime Minister Gilmar Pisas and Minister of Education, Science, Culture and Sport Sithree van Heydoorn. It features the Queen Emma Bridge, a cactus, a hummingbird and a traditional fishing boat, with the motto Mi país, mi orguyo – Kòrsou (transl. 'My country, my pride – Curaçao'), and was designed by Andresetti Monart.

Rendition of the winning concept by Andresetti Monart.

The new emblem was met with criticism and caused controversy when media reported that elements of the design had likely been copied from Shutterstock. Although Monart denied the allegations, Minister Van Heydoorn ordered an investigation into potential plagiarism and copyright violations within the design. The adoption of the emblem was therefore postponed indefinitely.

== See also ==
- Coat of arms of Aruba
- Coat of arms of Bonaire
- Coat of arms of Sint Maarten
