= Sint Maarten at the 2025 World Aquatics Championships =

- Flag of Sint Maarten
- World Aquatics code: MAA
- National federation: Sint Maartin Aquatic Federation

in Singapore
- Competitors: 2 in 1 sport
- Medals: Gold 0 Silver 0 Bronze 0 Total 0

World Aquatics Championships appearances
- 2019; 2022; 2023; 2024; 2025

Sint Maarten competed at the 2025 World Aquatics Championships in Singapore from July 11 to August 3, 2025.

== Competitors ==
The following is the list of competitors in the Championships.

Sport	Men	Women	Total
Swimming	1	1	2
Total	1	1	2

== Swimming ==
Sint Maarten entered 2 swimmers.

Men

Athlete	Event	Heat		Semi-final		Final	
Athlete	Event	Time	Rank	Time	Rank	Time	Rank
Nigel Fontenelle	50 m freestyle	25.00	85	Did not advance			
Nigel Fontenelle	50 m butterfly	27.58	85	Did not advance			

Women

Athlete	Event	Heat		Semi-final		Final	
Athlete	Event	Time	Rank	Time	Rank	Time	Rank
Adaya Sian Bourne	50 m freestyle	29.63	81	Did not advance			
Adaya Sian Bourne	50 m butterfly	32.73	75	Did not advance			
