= Sint Maarten at the 2022 World Aquatics Championships =

- Flag of Sint Maarten
- World Aquatics code: MAA

in Budapest, Hungary
- Competitors: 2 in 1 sport
- Medals: Gold 0 Silver 0 Bronze 0 Total 0

World Aquatics Championships appearances
- 2019; 2022; 2023; 2024; 2025

Sint Maarten competed at the 2022 World Aquatics Championships in Budapest, Hungary from 18 June to 3 July.

== Swimming ==
Swimmers from Sint Maarten have achieved qualifying standards in the following events.

| Athlete | Event | Heat | | Semifinal | | Final | |
| Athlete | Event | Time | Rank | Time | Rank | Time | Rank |
|---|---|---|---|---|---|---|---|
| Taffi Illis | Women's 50 m freestyle | 30.00 | 69 | did not advance | | | |
| Taffi Illis | Women's 50 m butterfly | 31.25 | 55 | did not advance | | | |
| Arianna Lont | Women's 400 m freestyle | 5:19.07 | 33 | - | | did not advance | |
| Arianna Lont | Women's 800 m freestyle | DNS | | - | | did not advance | |
