= Sint Maarten at the 2019 World Aquatics Championships =

- Flag of Sint Maarten

in Gwangju, South Korea
- Competitors: 1 in 1 sport
- Medals: Gold 0 Silver 0 Bronze 0 Total 0

World Aquatics Championships appearances
- 2019; 2022; 2023; 2024; 2025

Sint Maarten competed at the 2019 World Aquatics Championships in Gwangju, South Korea from 12 to 28 July.

== Swimming ==
Sint Maarten entered one swimmer.

Women

Athlete	Event	Heat		Semifinal		Final	
Athlete	Event	Time	Rank	Time	Rank	Time	Rank
Taffi Illis	50 m freestyle	29.76	79	did not advance			
Taffi Illis	50 m butterfly	31.33	54	did not advance			
