= Flag of The Hague =

The Hague
- Flag of The Hague since 1949
- Use: Municipal flag
- Proportion: 2:3
- Adopted: 2 December 1920
- Design: A flag with yellow at the top and green at the bottom

The flag of The Hague officially adopted on December 2, 1920 by a decision of the municipal government of The Hague. In 1920, it was decided that the flag would consist of two equal stripes of green and yellow. On March 28, 1949 the colors were modified. The order of the colors was reversed and the hue of the green stripe was changed. The current flag has a horizontal bicolour of yellow at the top and green at the bottom. Before 1920, The Hague colours were yellow and black. Black was presumably changed to green because green better symbolizes the peat soil on which The Hague was partly built. For the other part, The Hague was built on sandy soil (yellow). More plausibly, the green colour comes from the municipal coat of arms on which it is reflected in a grass field, on which a stork (The Hague's symbol) is depicted.

== Unofficial first flag ==
In 1857, the mayor of The Hague announced to the Minister of Interior that the colors of the flag would be black and yellow, equal to the color of the Coat of arms of The Hague. This flag has however never been officially established.

== Usage ==
The football club ADO Den Haag uses a rotated version of the flag in their logo. The logo of The Hague uses the colors of the flag since 2013.

== Gallery ==
Flag of The Hague between 1920 and 1949

Flag of The Hague until 1920

Logo of The Hague

== See also ==
- Coat of arms of The Hague

== Sources ==
- Sierksma, Klaes (1962). Nederlands vlaggenboek. Het Spectrum. pp. 68–69.
