= Sint Maarten at the 2024 World Aquatics Championships =

- Flag of Sint Maarten
- World Aquatics code: MAA
- National federation: Sint Maartin Aquatic Federation

in Doha, Qatar
- Competitors: 1 in 1 sport
- Medals: Gold 0 Silver 0 Bronze 0 Total 0

World Aquatics Championships appearances
- 2019; 2022; 2023; 2024; 2025

Sint Maarten competed at the 2024 World Aquatics Championships in Doha, Qatar from 2 to 18 February.

== Competitors ==
The following is the list of competitors in the Championships.

Sport	Men	Women	Total
Swimming	0	1	1
Total	0	1	1

== Swimming ==
Sint Maarten entered 1 swimmers.

Women

Athlete	Event	Heat		Semifinal		Final	
Athlete	Event	Time	Rank	Time	Rank	Time	Rank
Taffi Illis	50 metre freestyle	29.24	77	Did not advance			
Taffi Illis	50 metre butterfly	31.37	48	Did not advance			
