= Sint Maarten at the 2023 World Aquatics Championships =

- Flag of Sint Maarten
- World Aquatics code: MAA
- National federation: Sint Maartin Aquatic Federation

in Fukuoka, Japan
- Competitors: 0
- Medals: Gold 0 Silver 0 Bronze 0 Total 0

World Aquatics Championships appearances
- 2019; 2022; 2023; 2024; 2025

Sint Maarten is set to compete at the 2023 World Aquatics Championships in Fukuoka, Japan from 14 to 30 July.

== Swimming ==
Sint Maarten entered 2 swimmers.

Women

| Athlete | Event | Heat | | Semifinal | | Final | |
| Athlete | Event | Time | Rank | Time | Rank | Time | Rank |
|---|---|---|---|---|---|---|---|
| Abbi Illis | 100 metre freestyle | Did not start | | | | | |
| Abbi Illis | 50 metre breaststroke | Did not start | | | | | |
| Taffi Illis | 50 metre freestyle | Did not start | | | | | |
| Taffi Illis | 50 metre butterfly | Did not start | | | | | |
