= Coat of arms of Saba =

Coat of arms of Saba

The coat of arms of Saba was established in 1985 by the island council of Saba, when it was still part of the Netherlands Antilles. It remained the coat of arms of Saba after the dissolution of the Netherlands Antilles, and the subsequent change of Saba's constitutional status into a special municipality of the Netherlands in 2010.

It consists of a shield with a Sargasso shearwater (Puffinus lherminieri) (the national bird) on top, flanked by Saban cabbage (a historically important local food crop). In the middle is a representation of the island itself, with a fish, a sailboat, and a white potato (representing the local fishing and agriculture). The national motto is written on a golden banner below the shield, Latin: Remis velisque (literally "with oars and sails").

The royal decree of 20 September 2010, no. 10.002570 granted this arms to Saba as a public body of the Netherlands.

== See also ==
- Coat of arms of the Netherlands
- Coat of arms of the Netherlands Antilles
