= Offenbeek =

- Village
- Location in the Netherlands Location in the province of Limburg in the Netherlands
- Coordinates: 51°16′58″N 6°5′43″E
- Country: Netherlands
- Province: Limburg
- Municipality: Beesel

Area
  - Total: 2.47 km^{2} (0.95 sq mi)
- Elevation: 25 m (82 ft)

Population (2021)
  - Total: 4,720
  - Density: 1,910/km^{2} (4,950/sq mi)
- Time zone: UTC+1 (CET)
  - Summer (DST): UTC+2 (CEST)
- Postal code: 5953
- Dialing code: 077

Offenbeek (Limburgish: Óffebek) is a village in the Dutch province of Limburg. It is located in the municipality of Beesel, east of the village of Reuver.

The village was first mentioned in 1289 as de Offenbeke, and means "brook of Offo (person)".

Offenbeek was home to 195 people in 1840. At the end of the 19th century, the village started to industrialise and ceramic factories were opened. In 1964, the Fatima church was built.
