= Flag of Maastricht =

Dutch city flag

Maastricht
- Use: Municipal flag
- Proportion: 2:3
- Adopted: Historical (after 1549, 1647–? (1938), 1994–present)
- Design: A red field with a five-pointed star
- Use: Municipal flag
- Proportion: 2:3
- Adopted: 1938
- Relinquished: 1994
- Design: A horizontal bicolour of white and red

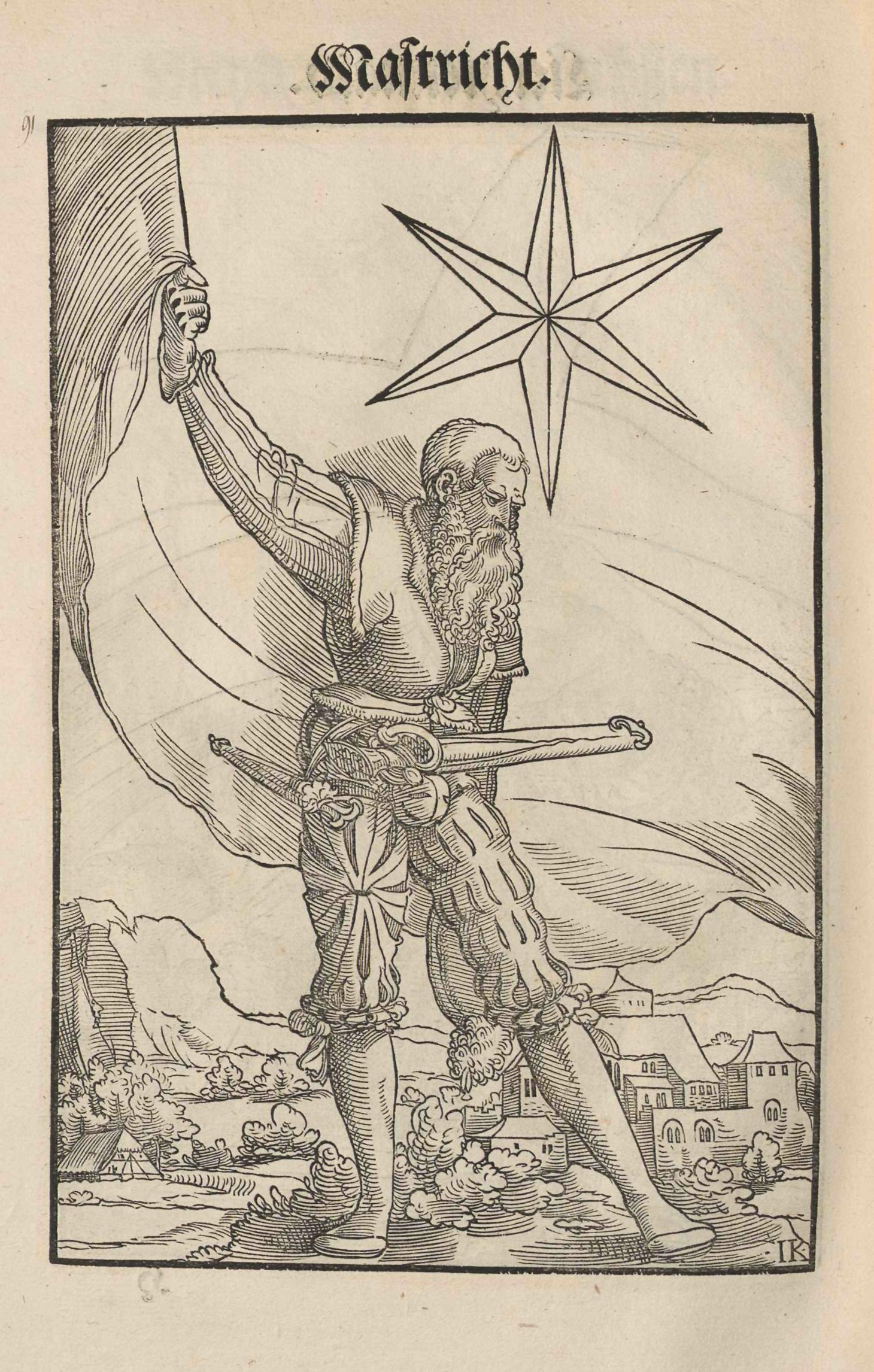
1545 depiction of the flag of the city (gules, a six-pointed mullet, argent)

The flag of Maastricht (Dutch: Vlag van Maastricht [ˈvlɑx fɑ maːˈstrɪxt]; Limburgish: Veendel vaan Mestreech [ˈveːndəl vaː məˈstʀeːx] or Drappo vaan Mestreech [ˈdʀɑpoː-]) is the official flag of Maastricht, the capital city of the province of Limburg, Netherlands. The flag is based on the corresponding municipal coat of arms. It constitutes a red vertical surface with a five-pointed star on its left side. This star dates from the 13th century and was probably used as a distinctive sign on merchandise back then. It had been a historical flag, with its first image of appearance (with a six-pointed star) dating from 1549, of the municipality but was replaced in 1938 with a flag similar in design to the Polish flag. To avoid confusion, the old flag was reinstated in 1994.

== History ==
In 1438 the flag of Maastricht is described as being as a pigeon with olive branch on a white field, with the first historic image dating from 1545. The mentioned image was published in the Wappenbuch von Meister IK-book in Frankfurt am Main, Germany. However, in 1549, the flag is stated as being "yellow-white-red". In 1647, the white-star-on-red design (with a six-pointed star) had apparently returned when the Peace of Münster treaty was signed. The next known design is the white-red (with the upper part of the flag being white, and the lower part being red) design similar to the Polish flag. In 1993 it was decided by the municipal government to reinstate the first design and the flag was re-inaugurated on January 1, 1994.

== Design ==
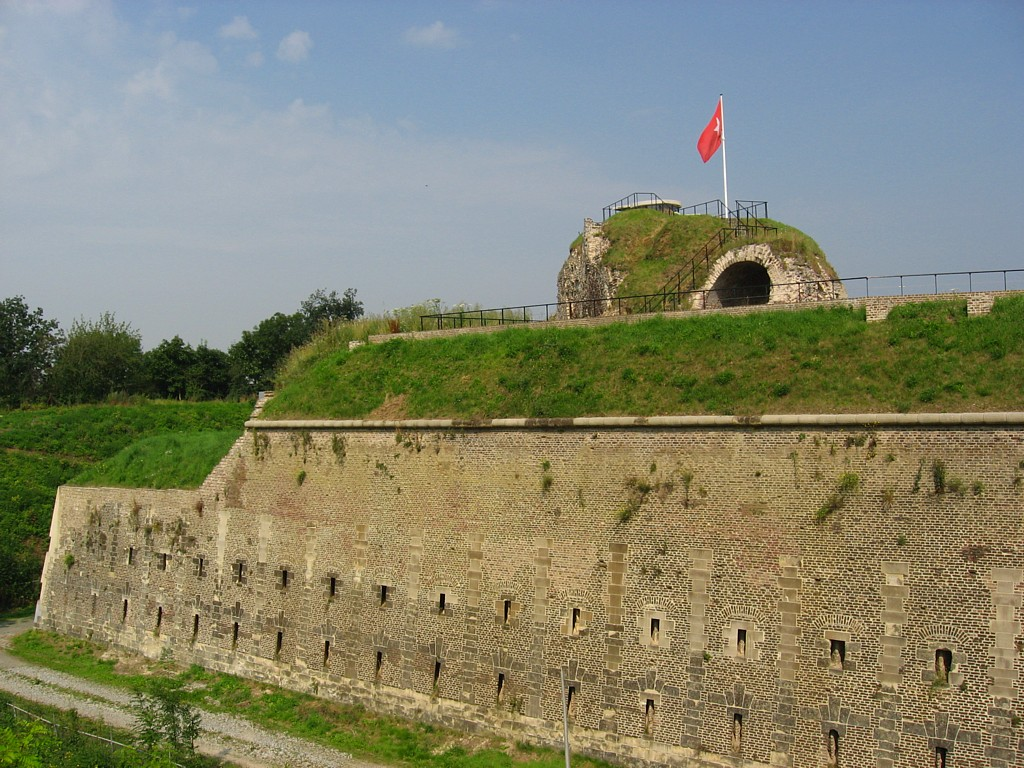
Flag of Maastricht on top of the Fort Sint Pieter (Saint Peter's Fortress)

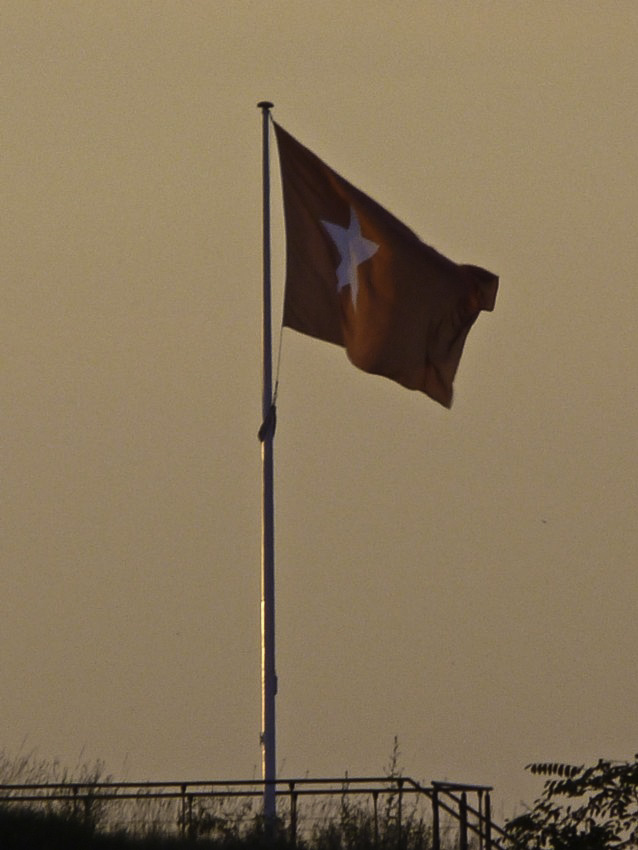
Flagpole on Fortress Sint Pieter

The height of the white star on the flag has to measure 3/5 of the entire flag. The white five-pointed star is placed so that the height above the star relates to the height under the star as 9 : 11. Furthermore, the proportions between the height and the width has to be 2:3. This design designation has been in use since 1994. The reasons for reselecting this design were varied. Firstly, there was to be no confusion with flags of other countries, provinces or cities. Secondly, the citizens of Maastricht were argued to feel more united by this design than the 1938–1994 design. Thirdly, the flag complies with the heraldric standards of the Netherlands. Finally, the colours of the Maastrichtian flag are white and vermilion, ones also used in the flag of the Netherlands.

== Symbolism and misconceptions ==
- Before 1549: early flag design was a pigeon with olive branch in the canton.
- First and current design (after 1549, 1647–? (1938), 1994–): this flag does not bear any symbolism towards communism, a political ideology known for using motifs involving a red field and star.
- Second design (1938–1994): this flag was easily confused with the Polish flag and similar designs.

== See also ==
- Coat of arms of Maastricht
- Morning Star flag
- White Star Line
