= Coat of arms of Sint Eustatius =

Coat of arms of Sint Eustatius

The coat of arms of Sint Eustatius consists of a shield and the motto. It was established on 9 November 2004 by the Island council of Sint Eustatius, when it was still part of the Netherlands Antilles. It remained the coat of arms of Sint Eustatius after the dissolution of the Netherlands Antilles and the subsequent change of Sint Eustatius's constitutional status into a special municipality of the Netherlands in 2010.

The shield consists of three parts, representing past, present and future represented the Golden Rock (a nickname for the prosperous historical Sint Eustatius), Fort Orange (Dutch: Fort Oranje) and the angelfish. The motto is written below as: superba et confidens (English: Proud and confident). The shield is surrounded by blue beads which were a sign of wealth.

The arms were designed by Walter Hellebrand and submitted to the Dutch High Council of Nobility for evaluation in 1999. Replying in 2002, the Council qualified the design as 'overcharged'. It urged to simplify the charges on the shield, and suggested to replace the other elements of the achievement with a crown, like the arms of Curaçao, Bonaire and the provinces of The Netherlands. In 2004 the Council concluded its advice was not followed.

After the island's change of constitutional status in 2010, the council of Sint Eustatius requested the High Council of Nobility to be granted this coat of arms as a public body of the Netherlands. The council approved and the arms were granted without changes by royal decree of 20 September 2010, no. 10.002023, blazoning it as Argent chapé ployé, a angelfish proper; the dexter chape per fess wavy, I. Gules a rocky mountain issuant Or, consisting of two parts, with the removed part two-third of the height of the part in front; II. barry wavy of ten pieces Azure and Argent; the sinister chape per fess; I. Argent, a fortress issuant with embattled walls Orange, consisting of an entrance gate and two pointed towers, voided Sable, and a clock tower, voided of the field; II. Vert. The shield is surrounded by a chain of beads Azure, placed on two sugar canes proper in saltire, surmounted by a mural crown Argent masoned Sable, consisting of four turrets with four battlements each. Motto: SUPERBA ET CONFIDENS in Latin script Sable on a scroll Argent.

== See also ==
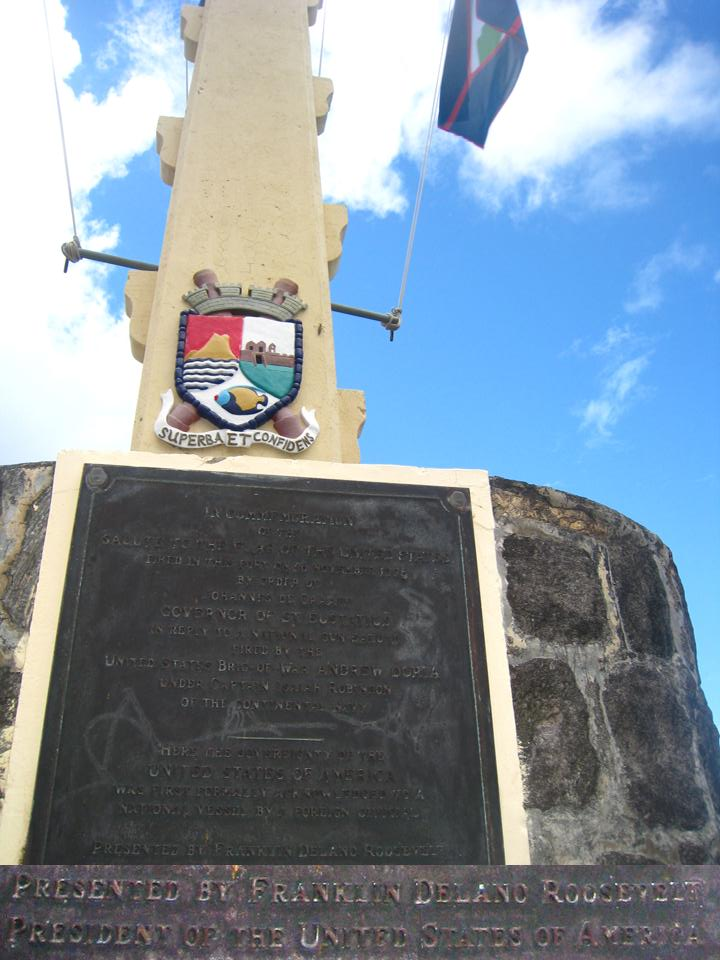
The Coat of Arms at Fort Orange

- Coat of arms of the Netherlands
- Coat of arms of the Netherlands Antilles
