= Coat of arms of Middelburg =

Versions
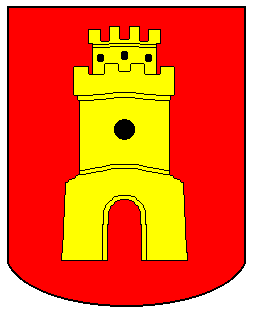
- The escutcheon from the coat of arms
- Armiger: Middelburg
- Shield: A red field, charged with a doubled golden tower.
- Supporter: The Reichsadler, crowned with the Rudolfinic imperial crown

The coat of arms of Middelburg is a canting coat of arms. It stands for the castle (Dutch: Burcht / Burg) of Middelburg, which was in the middle-ages located between two other castles, Domburg and Souburg. The tower in the coat of arms is also present in the flag of Middelburg. The colours probably originate from the coat of arms of the viscounts of Zeeland, they carried a coat of arms of a golden lion on a red background in the 13th century.

== History ==
The coat of arms of Middelburg (Zeeland) was used on a seal in 1299, this is the oldest known seal with the coat of arms of the city. Presumably this coat of arms descends from the coat of arms of count Willem II van Holland. The seal shows a different tower and gate than the current one. It shows a gate with merlons and a ringwall with two side towers, also with merlons. On the center tower there stands a tower keeper with a fork in one hand and a horn in the other. There are birds sitting on both spires of the side towers.

After the year 1500 a coat of arms appears with a double-headed eagle, this version probably originates from Emperor Maximiliaan I. The Holy Roman Empire had located a court of justice in Middelburg. This court presumably carried the double-headed eagle, while the city carried a single-headed eagle.

== Description ==

Since 31 juli 1817 the description is as follows:

Dutch:
De Rijksadelaar, houdende op deszelfs borst een schild van keel, beladen met een dubbelde tooren van goud.
English:
The Reichsadler, holding on its breast a shield of gules, loaded with a doubled tower of gold.

This insignia has since 31 July 1817, despite various municipal mergers, remained unchanged. On the drawing in the register of the Hoge Raad van Adel (cf. College of Arms), it appears that the eagle is brown and that it has an imperial crown on its head, on top of that it is armed with silver nails. (A Reichsadler is black, with a red beak and nails.)

=== Crown ===
Middelburg is one of the ten Dutch municipalities that carry the Rudolfinic imperial crown. This crown has however never officially been granted to the city. The crown was, since 1515, allowed to be carried on a banner, but not on the city's coat of arms. Only the crown of Medemblik is in azure (blue). The other eight: Amsterdam, Bolsward, Deventer, Hulst, Kampen, Nijmegen, Tiel and Zwolle are red.

== See also ==
- Middelburg, Zeeland
