= Coat of arms of The Hague =

Versions
- Escutcheon-only version
- Armiger: The Hague
- Motto: Vrede en Recht (Peace and Justice)

The coat of arms of The Hague is the official symbol of the city of The Hague.

It consists of a golden escutcheon with a white stork in natural colours holding a black eel, a count's crown as coronet, and two golden lions rampant regardant as supporters standing on a green decorative compartment. On 27 September 2012, the motto Vrede en Recht (English: Peace and Justice) was added to the compartment, referring to the city's global recognition as the home of international justice and accountability.

== Use of the coat of arms ==
As a coat of arms of a Dutch municipality, the coat of arms of The Hague is registered with the Hoge Raad van Adel (cf. College of Arms). These coats of arms are all effectively in the public domain, as the municipalities cannot claim copyright. In contrast, actually using the coat of arms to suggest any kind of official endorsement is restricted. The coat of arms may only be used by others than the city with the explicit permission of the municipal government. In general permission is not granted to others, because the coat of arms designates the city of The Hague.

== Older versions ==
(1816-1991)

(before 1816)
