= Coat of arms of Bonaire =

- Armiger: Bonaire
- Adopted: 1986

The coat of arms of Bonaire was established in 1986 by the island council, when Bonaire was still part of the Netherlands Antilles. It was retained as the coat of arms of Bonaire after the dissolution of the Netherlands Antilles and the subsequent change of Bonaire's constitutional status into a special municipality of the Netherlands in 2010. It consists of an azure shield, with a crown above it. The shield consists of a compass, ship's wheel, and a red six-pointed star.

== History ==
The coat of arms of Bonaire was approved on 26 June 1986 by the Island Council of Bonaire, under decision no. 9, while the island was still part of the Netherlands Antilles. It was publicly unveiled on 6 September 1986 in the presence of members of the Staten and the Prime Minister of the Netherlands Antilles. On 10 October 2010, following the dissolution of the Netherlands Antilles, Bonaire became a special municipality (bijzondere gemeente) of the Netherlands, and its 1986 coat of arms was retained as the island's official emblem.

== Design ==
The coat of arms consists of a azure colored shield, with a crown above it. The shield contains of a ship's wheel which encloses a silver shield that contains a red six-pointed star within a compass.

The azure colored shield represents the sea that surrounds the island. The golden colored ship's wheel that appears on the shield, represents the Bonairean sailors navigating the seas. There is a silver heart shield (hartschild) inlaid on to it, which bears a red colored six-pointed star enclosed within a black compass ring. The star and the compass ring were adopted from the flag of Bonaire, which was adopted earlier on 11 December 1981. The flag's four pointed compass ring was a reference to the sailors of Bonaire and the six pointed red star symbolised the blood of the people of the six traditional regions of Bonaire.

The shield is surmounted by a golden crown with five leaves and four pearls at the top. The crown represents the island's relation with the Royal House of Orange.

== See also ==
- Coat of arms of the Netherlands
- Coat of arms of the Netherlands Antilles
