= Coat of arms of Maastricht =

The coat of arms of Maastricht

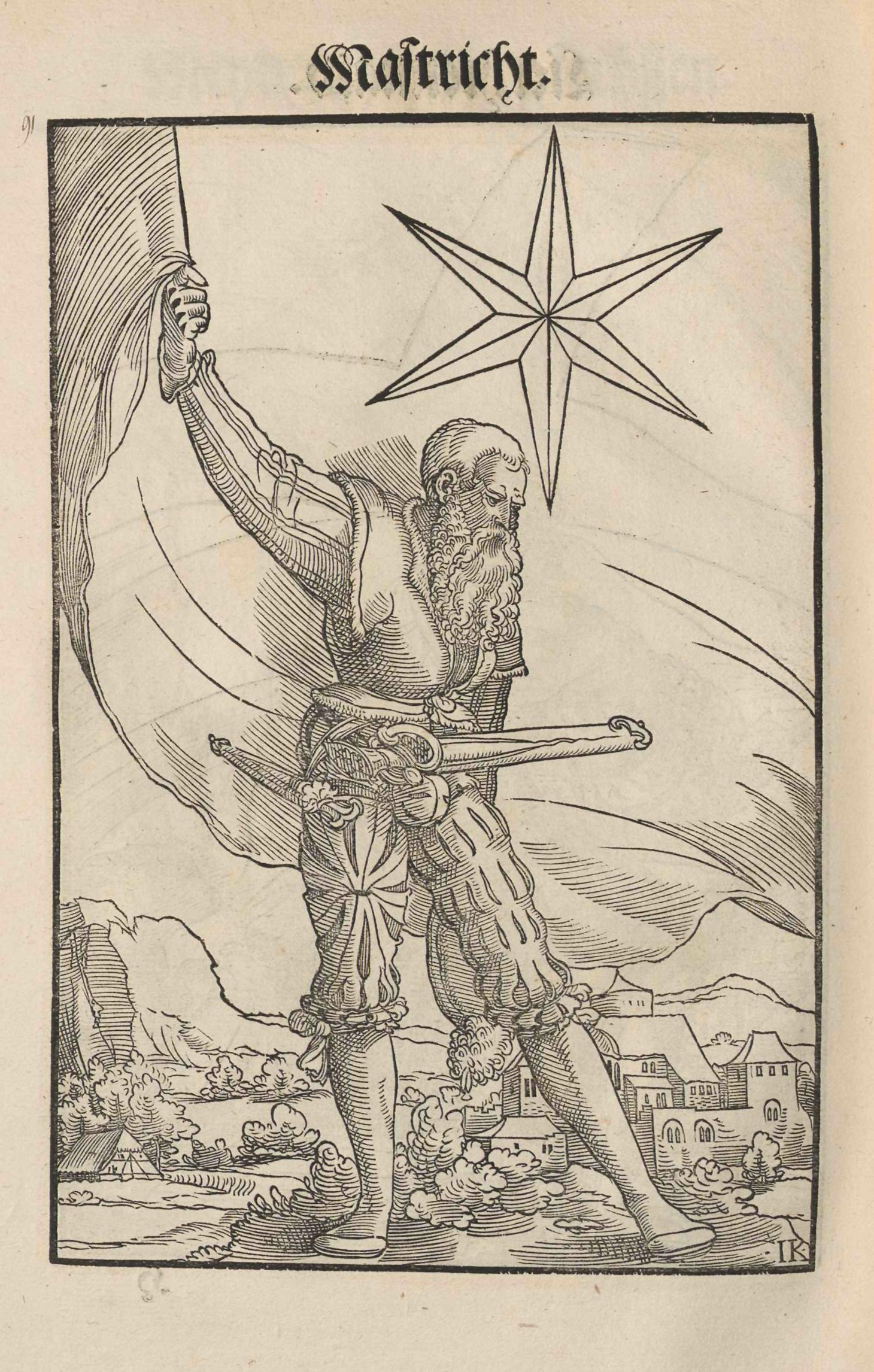
1545 depiction of the flag of the city (gules, a six-pointed mullet, argent)

The coat of arms of Maastricht (Dutch: wapen van Maastricht [ˈʋaːpə(ɱ) vɑ maːˈstrɪxt]; Limburgish: waope vaan Mestreech [ˈwɒːpə vaː məˈstʀeːx]) has been used since the Middle Ages as a symbol for the Dutch city of Maastricht in Limburg, The Netherlands. Since then, only the shield bearer (an angel) has been added to the coat of arms with the five-pointed star, although this has also been in use since 1535. The crown on the coat of arms was added when the coat of arms was officially confirmed by the High Council of Nobility on 15 September 1819.

== Blazon ==
The blazon of Maastricht's coat of arms reads as follows:

A red shield, charged with a five-pointed silver star; the shield held from behind by an angel and covered by a golden crown.

The Coat of arms itself is fairly simple: a red shield with a white (silver) five-pointed star on it. Behind the shield stands an angel of natural colour (heraldry colour), who acts as the shield bearer. The blazon does not mention that the angel's wings are silver, that she is dressed in blue and that her belt is gold-coloured. The angel holds the shield by a gold cord or rope. Nor does it mention that the crown has five leaves. The coat of arms certificate depicts a marquis's crown, which is missing from the register drawing.

== See also ==
- Flag of Maastricht

== Sources ==
- Sierksma, Klaes (1968): De gemeentewapens van Nederland. Utrecht: Het Spectrum (in Dutch)
- Zicht op Maastricht: Stadwapen (in Dutch)
- Wapen: Gemeente Maastricht (in Dutch)
