= Beesel =

Beesel Bezel
- Municipality
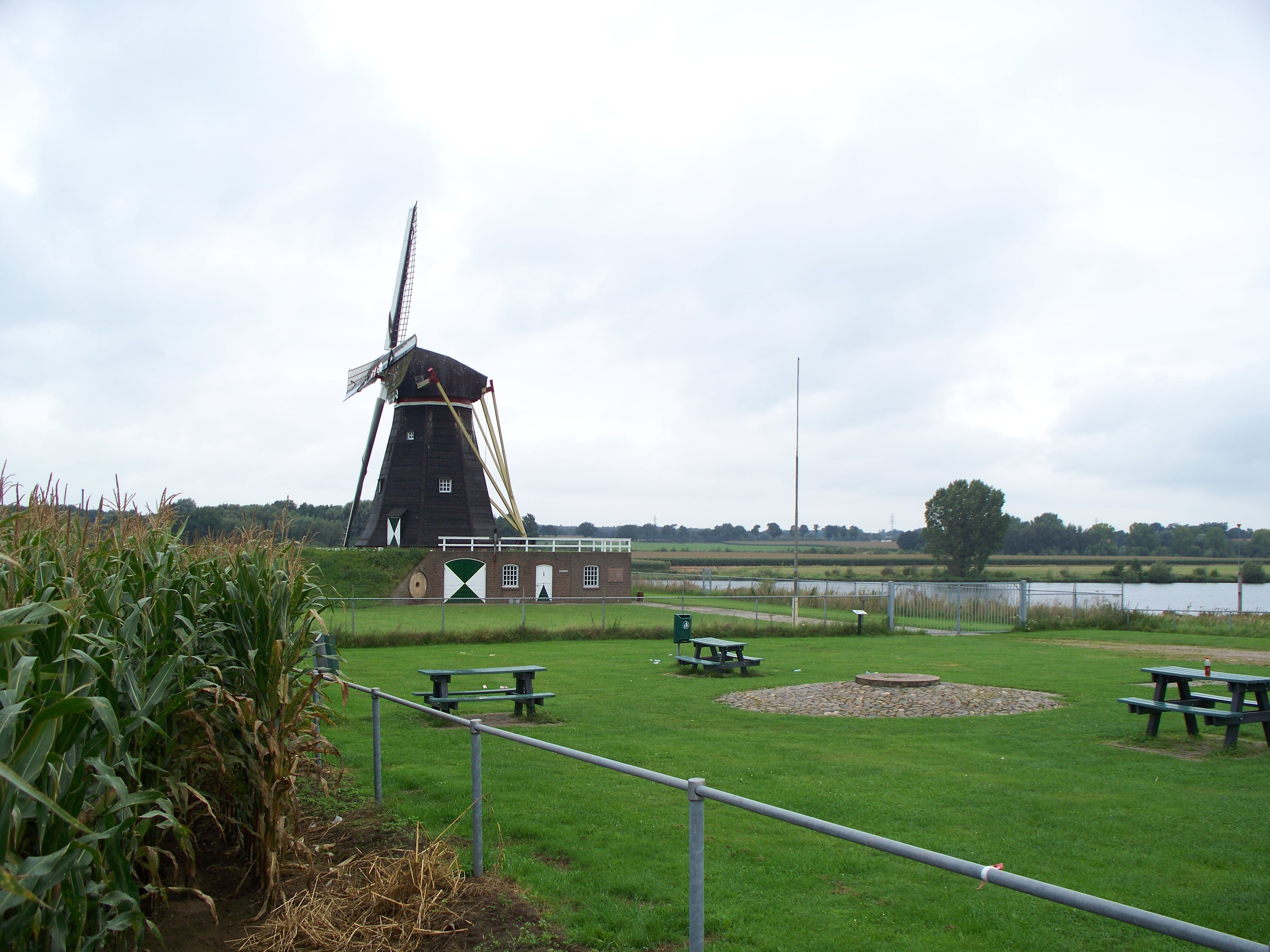
- Wind mill in Beesel

- Flag Coat of arms

- Location in Limburg
- Coordinates: 51°17′N 6°2′E
- Country: Netherlands
- Province: Limburg

Government
  - Body: Municipal council
  - Mayor: Martijn Derks (VVD)

Area
  - Total: 29.15 km^{2} (11.25 sq mi)
  - Land: 27.99 km^{2} (10.81 sq mi)
  - Water: 1.16 km^{2} (0.45 sq mi)
- Elevation: 25 m (82 ft)

Population (January 2021)
  - Total: 13,450
  - Density: 481/km^{2} (1,250/sq mi)
- Time zone: UTC+1 (CET)
  - Summer (DST): UTC+2 (CEST)
- Postcode: 5953–5954
- Area code: 077
- Website: www.beesel.nl

Beesel (Dutch: [ˈbeːzəl]; Limburgish: Bezel [ˈbeːzəl]) is a municipality and a town in the province of Limburg in the southeastern Netherlands.

== Population centres ==
- Beesel
- Offenbeek
- Reuver

=== Topography ===
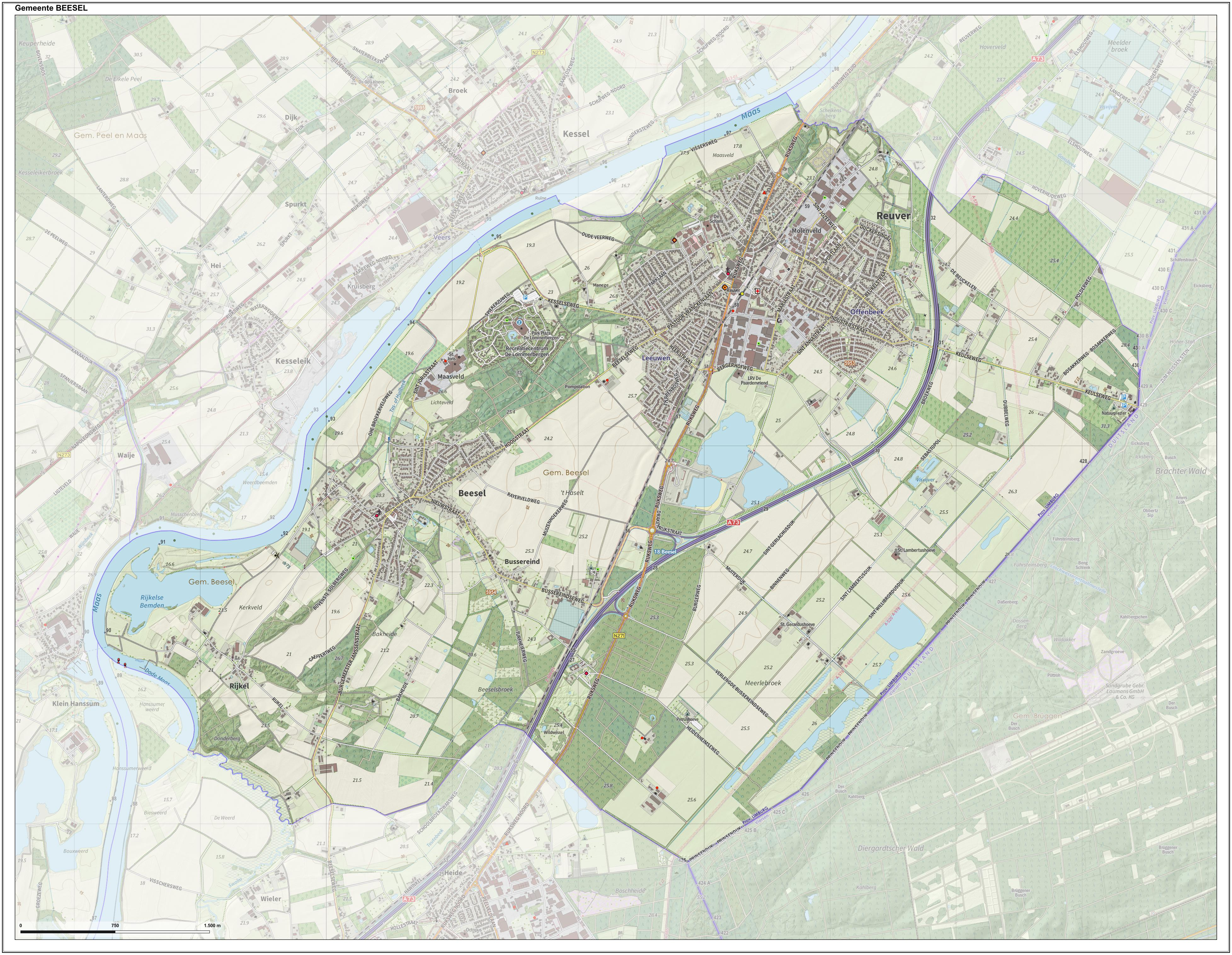

Topographic map of the municipality of Beesel, June 2015.

== The town of Beesel ==
The town of Beesel lies about 10 km north of Roermond. Although the municipality is named after this village, it is not the largest town in the municipality, and neither is the municipal hall located in Beesel.

In 2001, Beesel had 7,382 inhabitants. The built-up area of the town was 0.53 km², and contained 706 residences.

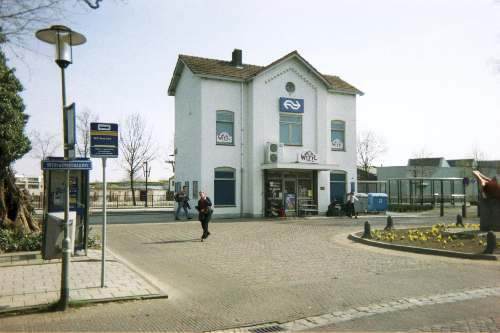
Reuver Station

== Transportation ==
- Reuver railway station

== Notable people ==
- Mark Jansen (born 1978 in Reuver) a Dutch guitarist, vocalist and songwriter, worked with the symphonic metal band After Forever
- Sander Gommans (born 1978 in Reuver) a Dutch musician with symphonic metal band After Forever

== Gallery ==
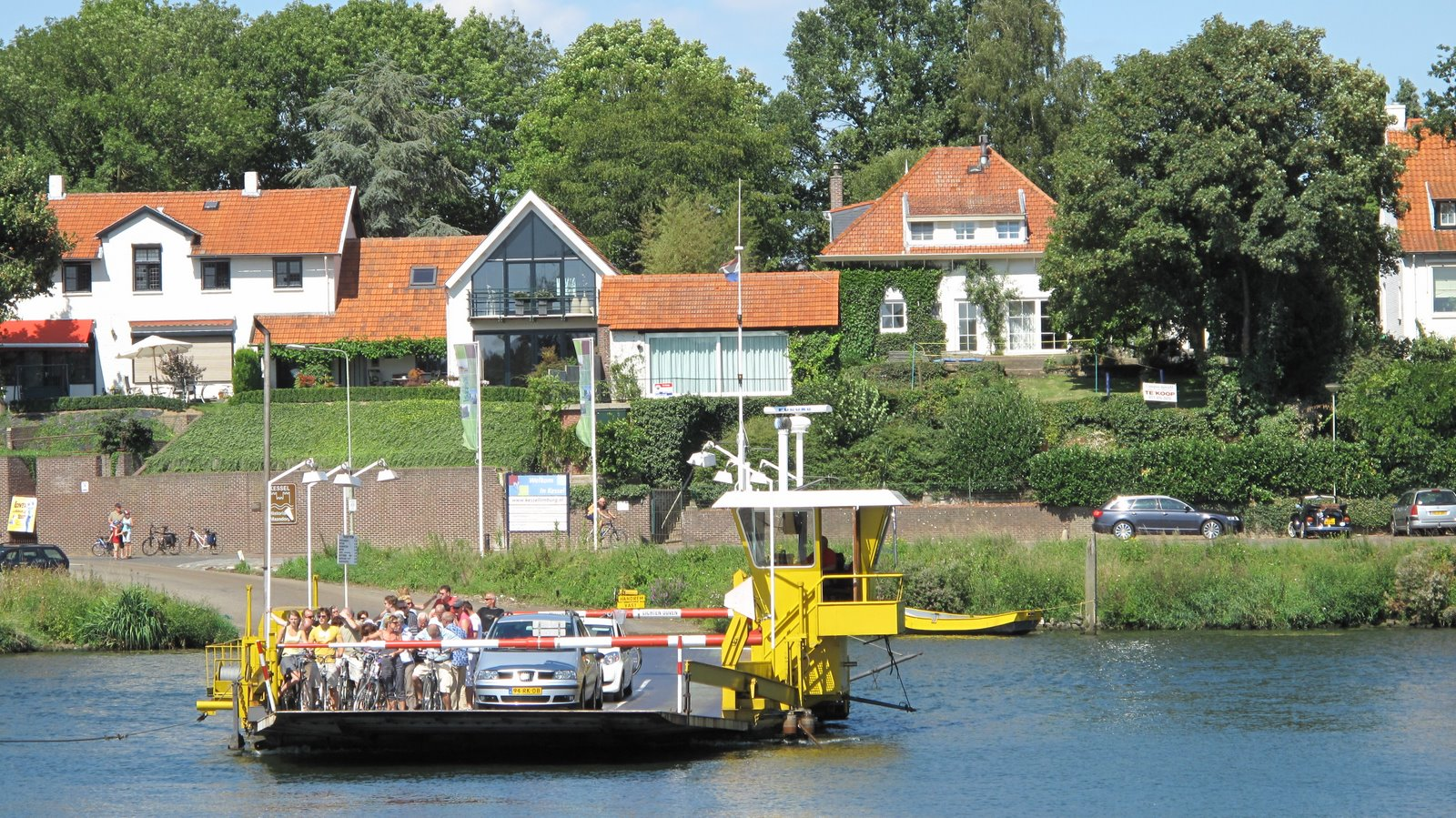
Beesel, - panoramio

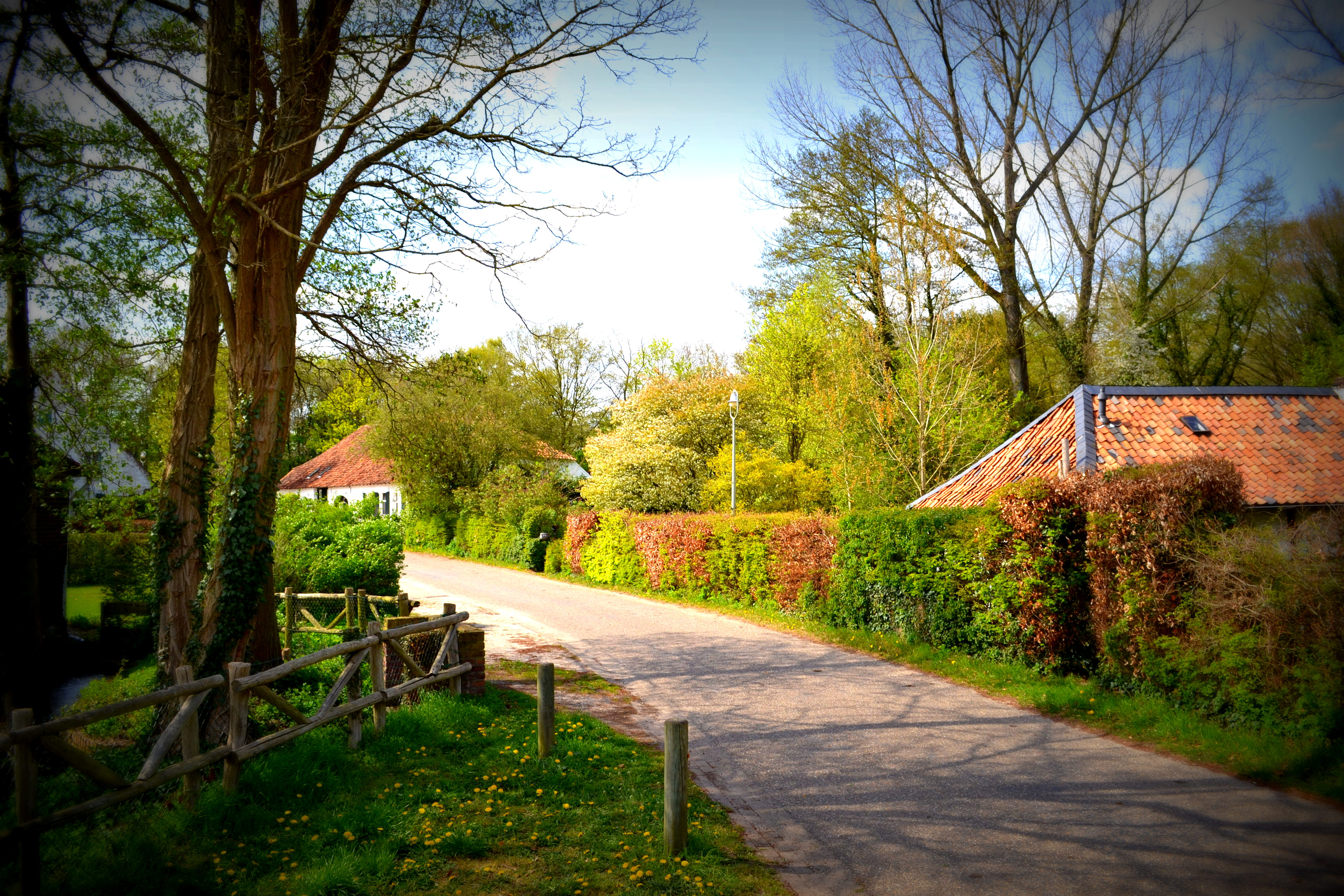
Ronckenstein

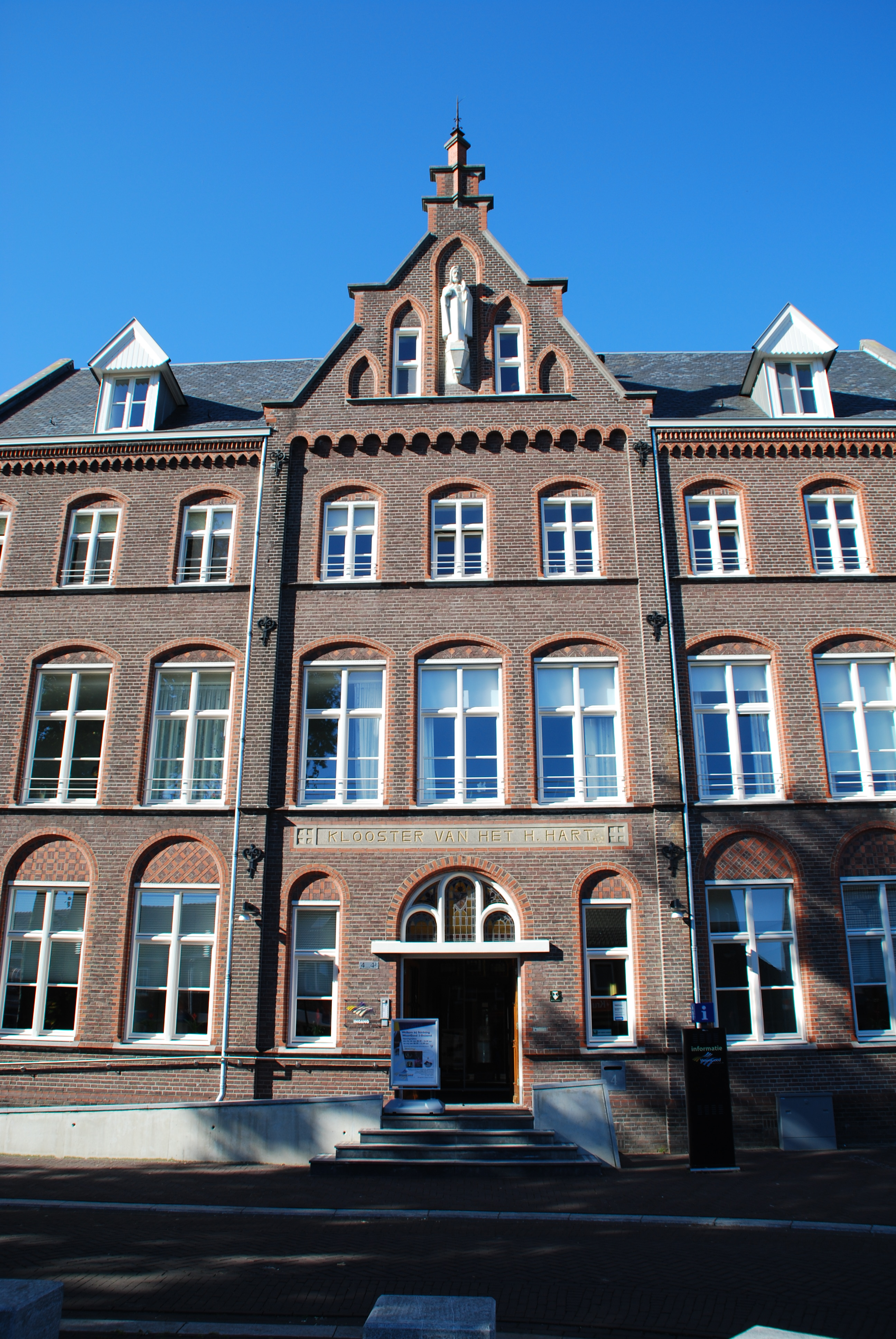
Heilig Hartklooster, Reuver

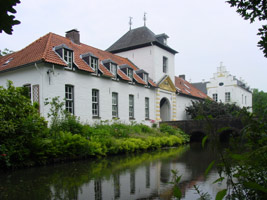
Nieuwenbroek
