= Coat of arms of Aruba =

- Armiger: Aruba
- Adopted: 15 November 1955; 70 years ago
- Crest: A lion couchant Gules
- Shield: Quartered by a cross Argent, the first Azure an aloe plant Or, the second Or the Hooiberg hill Vert issuant from barry wavy sea of Azure and Argent, the third Or two dexter hands Gules shaking each other fesswise, the fourth Gules an Argent cogwheel.
- Supporters: A pair of laurel branches Vert, tied at the bottom.

The Coat of arms of Aruba has been officially in use since November 15, 1955, as the recognized national symbol of Aruba.

== History ==
The Eilandenregeling Nederlandse Antillen (ERNA, English: Constitution of the Netherlands Antilles) established the autonomy of the various island territories in the Netherlands Antilles. The regulation was announced on March 3, 1951, by Royal Decree, four years before the Constitution of the Netherlands Antilles came into effect, and remained in force in modified form until the Netherlands Antilles were dissolved on October 10, 2010.

On March 27, 1953, the Executive College of Aruba (Dutch: bestuurscollege) announced in the newspaper a competition to design a coat of arms for the island territory of Aruba. The College wanted to see an expression of the island's autonomy, following the political decentralization of the Dutch Antilles in accordance with the ERNA in 1954. Aruba was the first of the Netherlands Antilles to use a coat of arms. The coat of arms was originally designed by the Atelier voor Heraldische Kunst (Studio for Heraldic Arts), located in Amsterdam, Netherlands. On this design, however, the Government of Aruba made two changes with the approval of the Studio for Heraldic Arts to make it even more reflective of Aruba's distinctive symbols. These changes are in the first and second quarters of the coat of arms, namely a sun and the peak of Jamanota, were changed to the Aloe vera and Hooiberg, respectively.

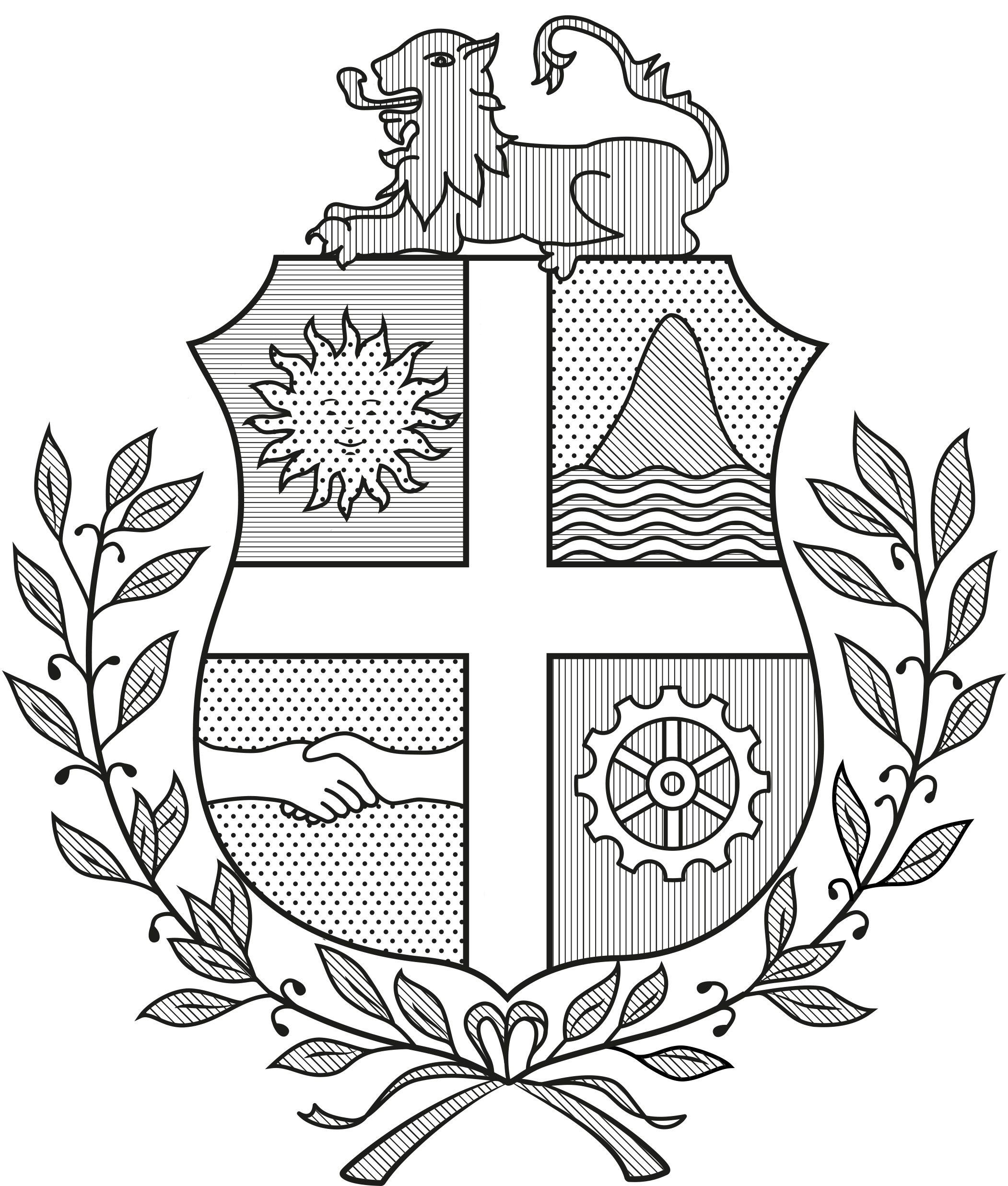
Original 1953 proposal for the coat of arms of Aruba. The top-right field depicts a sun with a face, the top-left field depicts Jamanota hill.

Heraldic tinctures
Class	Metals		Colors		
name	Argent	Or	Gules	Azure	Vert
Tincture					
Non-heraldic equivalent	Silver/White	Gold/Yellow	Red	Blue	Green
Hatching					

== Description ==
=== Blazon ===
The official description of the coat of arms:

Shield: quartered by a cross Argent, the first Azure an aloe plant Or, the second Or the Hooiberg hill Vert issuant from barry wavy sea of Azure and Argent, the third Or two dexter hands Gules shaking each other fesswise, the fourth Gules an Argent cogwheel

Crest: a lion couchant Gules

Supporters: a pair of laurel branches Vert, tied at the bottom

=== Symbolism ===
The coat of arms consists of seven main elements:

1. Lion crest symbolizes power and generosity, emphasized through the color red.
2. White Cross divides the shield into quarters, representing devotion and faith.
3. First quarter: flowering aloe plant, symbolizing well-being and the island's first significant export.
4. Second quarter: Hooiberg, Aruba's recognizable hill, represents Aruba rising out of the sea. Green signifies joy for autonomy, wavy lines depict the sea.
5. Third quarter: hands shaking, symbolizing friendly relations with other nations and people in both the political and economic sectors. Red symbolizes generosity, modesty, and industriousness.
6. Fourth quarter: cogwheel representing Aruba's industry, the main source of livelihood.
7. Below the shield, a pair of laurel branches tied at the bottom, symbolizing peace and friendship.

== See also ==
- Coat of arms of the Netherlands
- Armorial of North America
- Armorial of South America
