= Coat of arms of Zaanstad =

Coat of arms as the municipality of Zaanstad uses, as the High Councill of Nobility acknowledges.

Coat of arms of the municipality Zaanstad, as it is sometimes depicted.

The coat of arms of Zaanstad has been formally acknowledged since 27 February 1974. The coat of arms was previously that of the jurisdictional area of Westsane en Crommenie, which now form the municipality of Zaanstad. These two areas were on the same areas as the municipalities who fused in 1974 to become the municipality of Zaanstad. The municipality of Assendelft alone used a coat of arms who didn't look like those of the other municipalities. The other municipalities and places (Koog aan de Zaan, Krommenie, Westzaan, Wormerveer, Zaandam en Zaandijk) used a coat of arms with four lions in it.

== History ==
In the 17th and 18th century the region surrounding the Zaan was very important in the whaling business. For this reason the municipality of Zaanstad uses a coat of arms with two whales as supporters. The blazon is not clear about the species of whales. Therefore, the colors are not clear, the blazon only says: two whales of natural color. This led to another version of the coat of arms with two black whales as supporters, which is not incorrect in Dutch heraldry since both colours whales exist in real life. This version was published in 1989, in a coat of arms guide for Dutch municipalities issued by the Bank Nederlandse Gemeenten.

The municipality has used 3 versions of the coat of arms, between 1974 and 2009 they have uses a stylized version of the official coat of arms. The arabesque was blue, just like the whales. The shield was oval. Because the coat of arms was not like the official coat of arms more and more resistance came to its use. Since 2009 the municipality uses a coat of arms according to the description as is known at the High Council of Nobility (Hoge Raad van Adel).

== Blazon ==
The blazon of the coat of arms of Zaanstad, as written down by the High Council of Nobility, is as follows:

Gevierendeeld: I in keel een omgewende leeuw van zilver, II in zilver een leeuw van keel, III in zilver een omgewende leeuw van keel, IV in keel een leeuw van zilver. Schildhouders: twee walvissen van natuurlijke kleur, de staarten omhoog. Het geheel geplaatst op een arabesk van sinopel.

— High Council of Nobility, (in Dutch) Heraldrywiki: Zaanstad

In English:

Quartered: I gules a sinister lion of silver, II in silver a lion of gules, III in silver a sinister lion of gules, IV in gules a lion of silver. Supporters: two whales of natural color, the tails up. All placed on an arabesque of vert.

Meaning, the shield is divided in four parts. In the first (for the viewer, upper left) is standing lion of silver in a red field, the second (upper right) has a standing red lion in a field of silver, the third is the same as the first, but mirrored. As is the fourth towards the second. All lions on the same levels face on another.

The whales are the supporters and hold the shield with their tails. The arabesque is green.
