= Coat of arms of Sint Maarten =

- Armiger: Country of Sint Maarten
- Adopted: 7 November 1982; 43 years ago

The coat of arms of Sint Maarten, adopted on 7 November 1982, consists of a shield with a rising sun and the motto. The shield displays the courthouse in the centre, the border monument to the right, the orange-yellow sage (which is the national flower) to the left. The orange border refers to the Dutch royal house. Flying in front of the rising sun is the brown pelican, which is the national bird of Sint Maarten. Under the shield is a ribbon with the Latin motto Semper progrediens (English: 'Always progressing').

== See also ==
- Flag of Sint Maarten
- Coat of arms of the Netherlands
