= Supporter =

Figures usually placed on either side of an heraldic shield and depicted holding it up

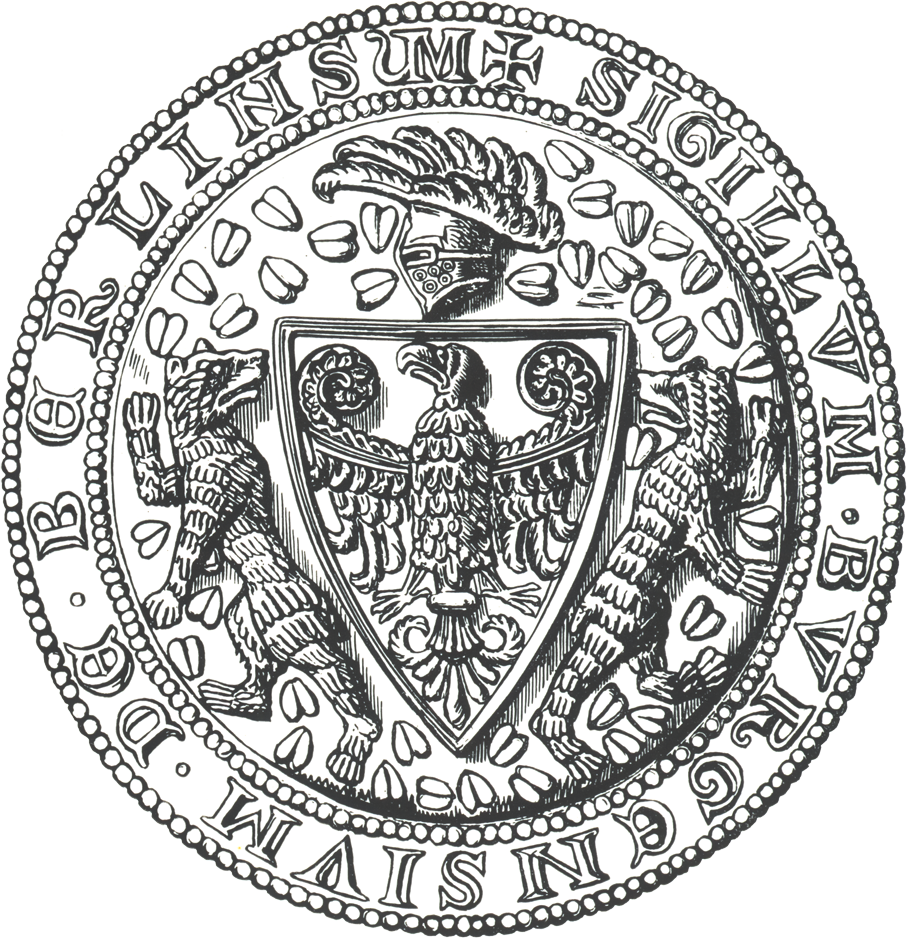
Seal of the city of Berlin (1280), showing the Brandenburg coat of arms flanked by two bears

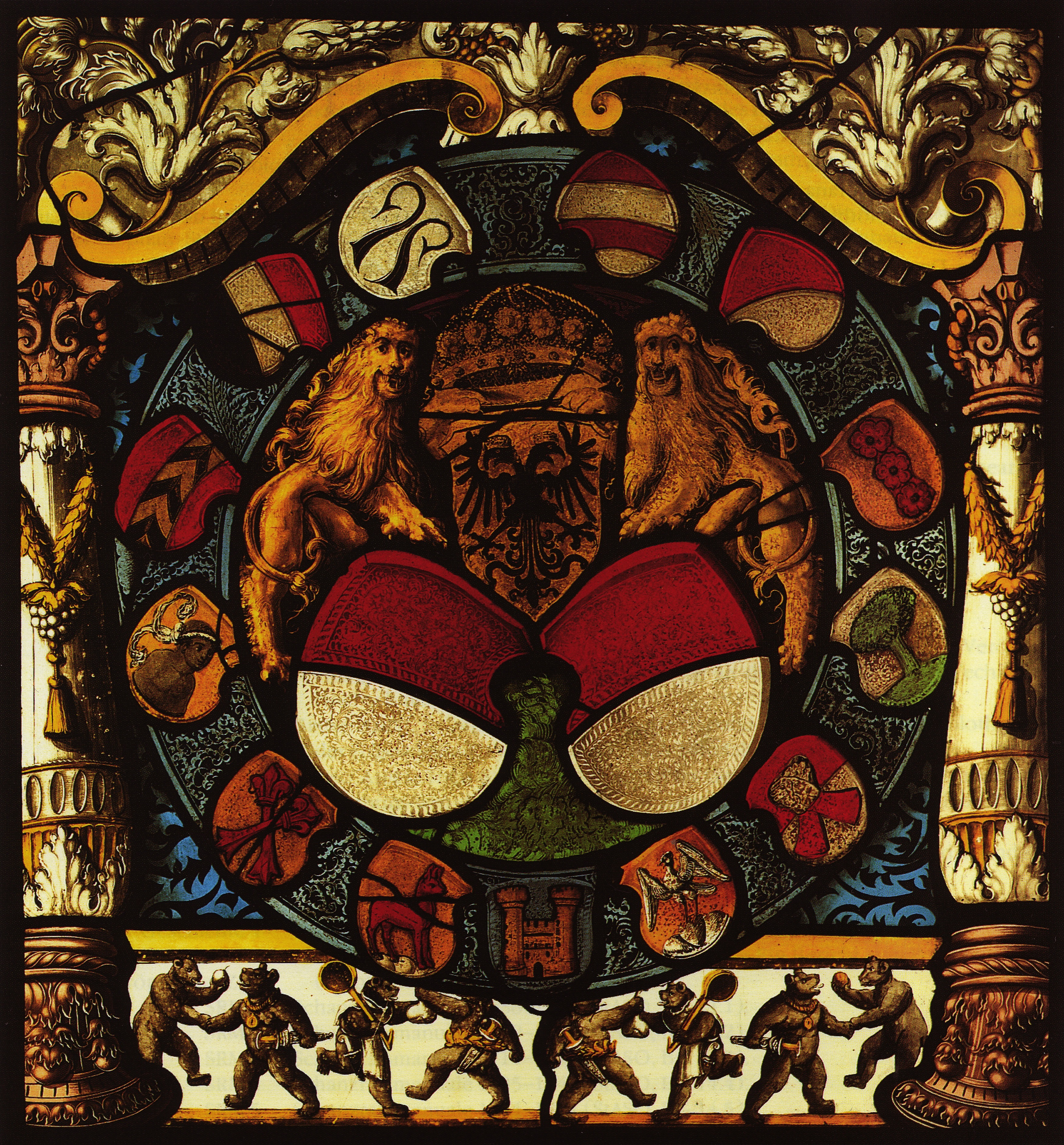
Standesscheibe of Solothurn, c. 1520, with two lions as supporters

Early example of the Royal Arms of England with lion and dragon as supporters, from a painting of Edward VI dated c. 1547

In heraldry, supporters, sometimes referred to as attendants, are figures or objects usually placed on either side of the shield and depicted holding it up.

Historically, supporters were left to an individual's free choice and were assumed and changed at will, not always having any meaning whatsoever. In more modern times, restrictions have been put in place in certain countries and nowhere more prevalent than in the United Kingdom.

Early forms of supporters are found in medieval seals. However, unlike the coronet or helmet and crest, supporters were not part of early medieval heraldry. As part of the heraldic achievement, they first become fashionable towards the end of the 15th century, but even in the 17th century were not necessarily part of the full heraldic achievement (being absent, for example, in Siebmachers Wappenbuch of 1605).

The figures used as supporters may be based on real or imaginary animals, human figures, and in rare cases plants or other inanimate objects, such as the pillars of Hercules of the coat of arms of Spain. Often, as in other elements of heraldry, these can have local significance, such as the fisherman and the tin miner granted to Cornwall County Council, or a historical link; such as the lion of England and unicorn of Scotland in the two variations of the coat of arms of the United Kingdom. The arms of nutritionist John Boyd-Orr use two 'garbs' (wheat sheaves) as supporters; the arms of USS Donald Cook, missiles; the arms of the state of Rio Grande do Norte in Brazil, trees. Letters of the alphabet are used as supporters in the arms of Valencia, Spain. Human supporters can also be allegorical figures, or, more rarely, specifically named individuals.

There is usually one supporter on each side of the shield, though there are some examples of single supporters placed behind the shield, such as the imperial eagle of the coat of arms of the Holy Roman Empire. The coat of arms of the Republic of the Congo provide an extremely unusual example of two supporters issuing from behind the shield. While such single supporters are generally eagles with one or two heads, there are other examples, including the cathedra in the case of some Canadian cathedrals. At the other extreme and even rarer, the Scottish chief Dundas of that Ilk had three supporters: two conventional red lions and the whole supported by a salamander. The coat of arms of Iceland even has four supporters.

The context of the application of supporters may vary, although entitlement may be considered conditioned by grant of a type of augmentation of honour by admission in orders of chivalry or by heraldic authorities, such as in the case of traditional British heraldry.

== Attitude ==
Animal supporters are, by default, as close to rampant as possible, if the nature of the supporter allows it (this does not need to be mentioned in the blazon), though there are some blazoned exceptions. An example of whales 'non-rampant' is the arms of the Dutch municipality of Zaanstad.

== Regional development and entitlement ==
Older writers trace origins of supporters to their usages in tournaments, where the shields of the combatants were exposed for inspection, and guarded by their servants or pages disguised in fanciful attire. However, medieval Scottish seals afford numerous examples in which the 13th and 14th century shields were placed between two creatures resembling lizards or dragons. Also, the seal of John, Duke of Normandy, eldest son of the King of France, before 1316 bears his arms as; France ancient, a bordure gules, between two lions rampant away from the shield, and an eagle with expanded wings standing above it.

=== Australia ===
In Australia, Knights or Dames of the Order of Australia may be granted supporters. It is unclear whether supporters may only be used on arms granted by Garter Principal King of Arms, or whether other heraldic authority suffices. Further, as arms may be legitimately adopted upon an armiger's whim, there may be nothing limiting the adoption of supporters by any person, should they so choose.

=== Canada ===
In Canada, Companions of the Order of Canada, Commanders of the Order of Military Merit, Commanders of the Royal Victorian Order, people granted the style the Right Honourable, and corporations are granted the use of supporters on their coats of arms. Further, on his retirement from office as Chief Herald, Robert Watt was granted supporters as an honour.

=== France ===
In France, writers made a distinctive difference on the subject of supporters, giving the name of Supports to animals, real or imaginary, thus employed; while human figures or angels similarly used are called Tenants (i.e. 'holders'). Trees and other inanimate objects which are sometimes used are called Soutiens.

=== New Zealand ===
Knights Grand Companion and Principal Companions of the New Zealand Order of Merit are granted the use of heraldic supporters.

=== Spain ===
In Spain, there is a difference between tenantes, used for human figures, soportes, used for beasts, and sosténes, used for anything other than humans or beasts. There aren't any rules governing the use, position, or whether they face the viewer or not. As a matter of fact, Vicente de Cadenas y Vicent says "There are no rules that determine the use of [supporters] and it can be considered that their use are complete capriciousness or fantasy, without any precedent, in almost the totality of cases, with documented justification for the inclusion of these ornaments with the arms of a House or individual." The only generally accepted rule is that female and ecclesiastical arms should not have supporters, with the only exception for ecclesiastical the use of angels or when it comes to the arms of saints or monasteries.

=== United Kingdom ===
Originally, in England, supporters were regarded as little more than mere decorative and artistic appendages.

In the United Kingdom, supporters are typically an example of special royal favour, granted at the behest of the sovereign. Hereditary supporters are normally limited to hereditary peers, certain members of the Royal Family, and to some chiefs of Scottish clans. Non-hereditary supporters are granted to life peers; Knights and Ladies Companion of the Order of the Garter; Knights and Ladies of the Order of the Thistle; Knights and Dames Grand Cross of the Order of the Bath, the Order of St Michael and St George, the Royal Victorian Order and the Order of the British Empire; and Bailiffs and Dames Grand Cross of the Order of St John. Knights banneret were also granted non-hereditary supporters, but no such knight has been created since the time of Charles I.

Supporters may also be granted to corporations which have a royal charter.

== Examples ==
A coconut palm and a carnauba palm as supporters in the coat of arms of Rio Grande do Norte.

The two Ls in the coat of arms of Valencia (city) mark it as 'doubly loyal'.

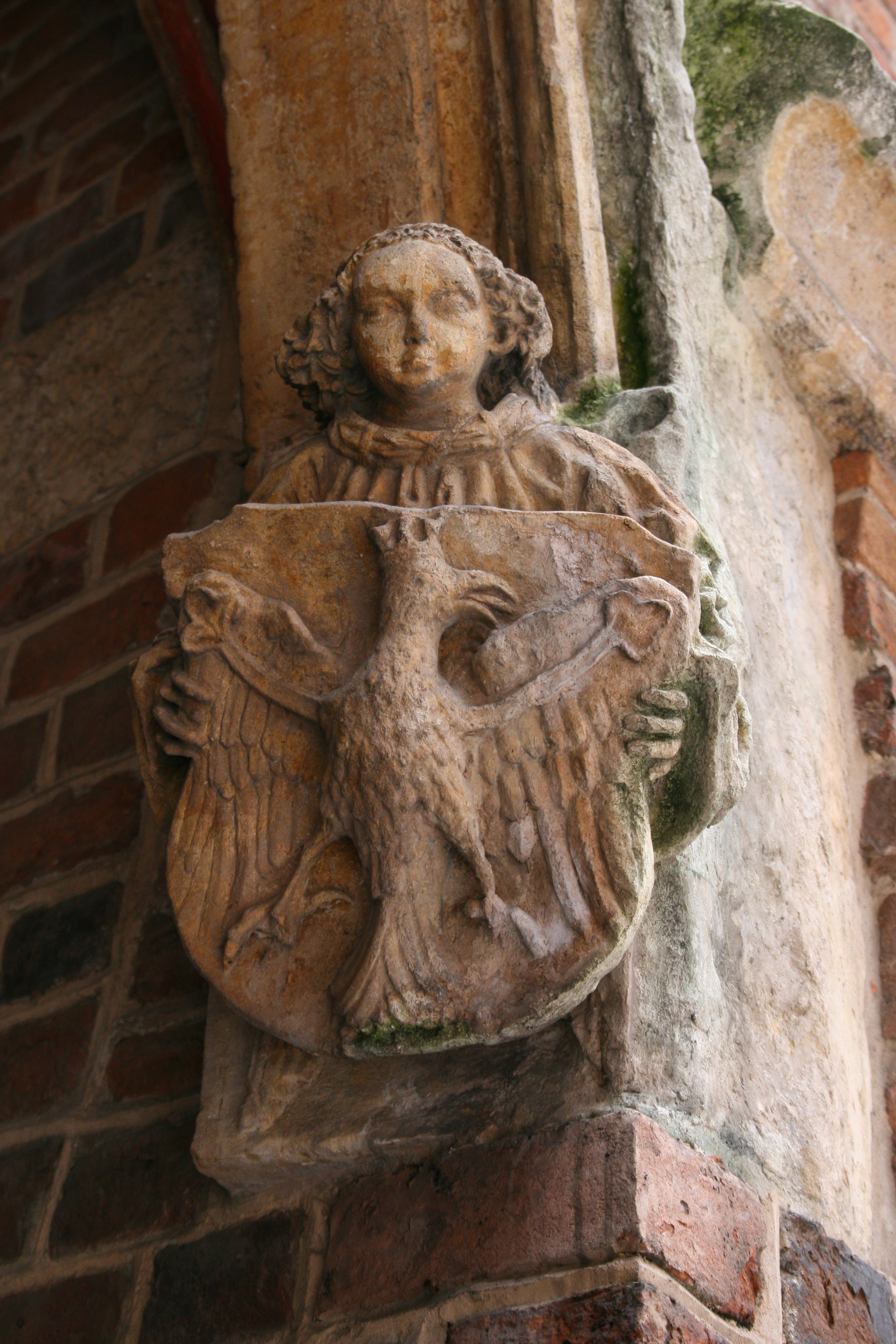
An angel is the single supporter of this Kraków sculpture of the arms of Poland.

'Falling' whales support the arms of Zaanstad

Flags are the supporters in the arms of Supreme Headquarters Allied Powers Europe

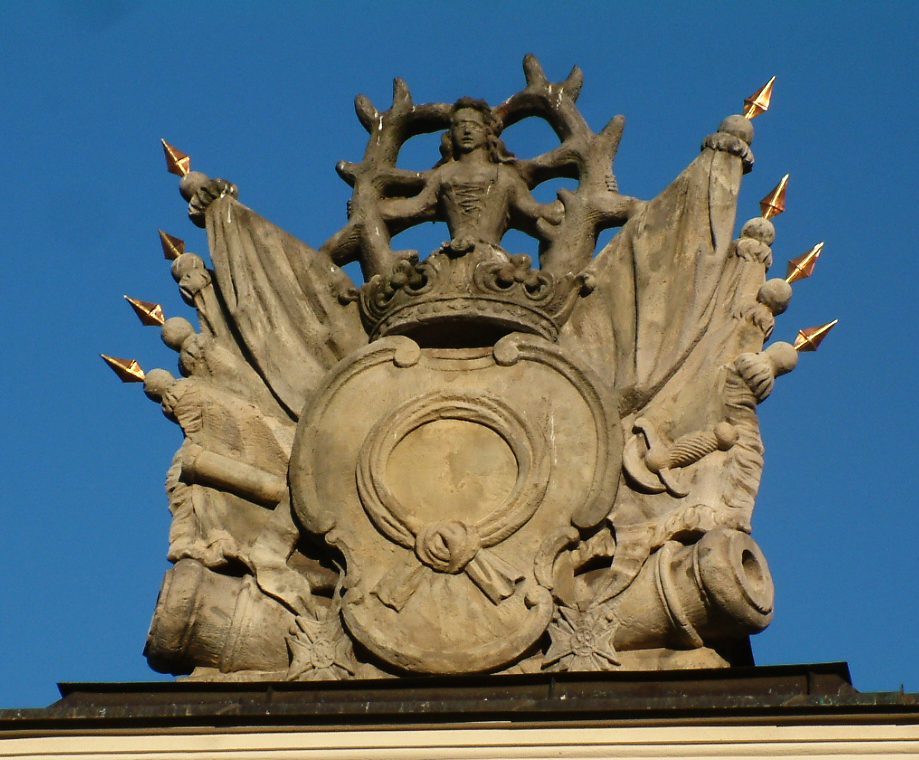
Flags and cannons are the supporters in the arms of Kazimierz Raczyński

The coat of arms of Spain is supported by columns representing the Pillars of Hercules.

The coat of arms of Austria has one supporter, an eagle, which bears the escutcheon on its breast. This arrangement is common where eagles and other birds are used as supporters, as in the Great Seal of the United States and the coat of arms of Russia.

The allegorical figures Liberty and blindfolded Justice support a shield on the flag of the State of New York

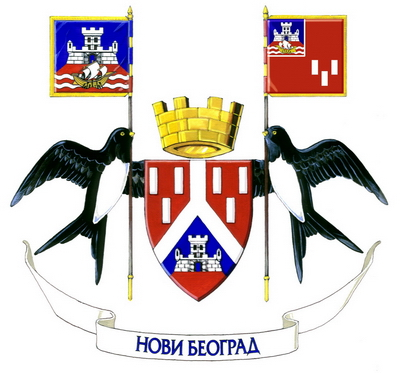
The coat of arms of the Municipality of New Belgrade is supported by two swallows.

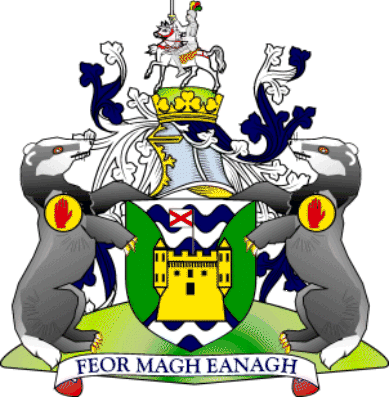
Badgers on the arms of County Fermanagh, Northern Ireland.

The arms of South Georgia and the South Sandwich Islands feature a fur seal and macaroni penguin as supporters.

Royal arms of the United Kingdom (as used in England, Northern Ireland, and Wales) has lion supporter (for England) in the dexter and unicorn supporter (for Scotland) in the sinister.

Coat of Arms of Malaysia which has two tigers as the supporters.

Arms of Margaret Thatcher, with Isaac Newton and a Royal Navy Admiral as supporters.

The coat of arms of Iceland is the only Nation to feature 4 supporters. Each supporter represents a protector and intercardinal direction. The bull is the protector of northwestern Iceland. The eagle or griffin is the protector of northeastern Iceland. The dragon is the protector of southeastern Iceland. The rock-giant is the protector of southwestern Iceland.

== See also ==
- Confronted animals
