= Coat of arms of the Netherlands =

Coat of arms of the Kingdom of the Netherlands

Versions
- Lesser achievement

- Greater (royal) achievement
- Armiger: Willem-Alexander of the Netherlands
- Adopted: 10 July 1907; 23 April 1980
- Crest: Dutch royal Crown
- Shield: Azure, billetty Or a lion with a coronet Or armed and langued Gules holding in his dexter paw a sword Argent hilted Or and in the sinister paw seven arrows Argent pointed and bound together Or
- Supporters: Two lions rampant Or armed and langued Gules
- Motto: French: Je Maintiendrai (I will hold)
- Other elements: The monarch places this coat of arms on a mantle gules lined with Ermine. Above the mantle is a pavilion gules again topped with the royal crown.
- Earlier version: 24 August 1815

The coat of arms of the Kingdom of the Netherlands was originally adopted in 1815 and later modified in 1907. The arms are a composite of the arms of the former Dutch Republic and the arms of the House of Nassau; it features a shield strewn with small rectangles and, as its main element, a lion grasping a sword in one hand and a bundle of arrows in the other and is the arms of dominion and heraldic symbol of the monarch (King Willem-Alexander) and the country. The monarch uses a version of the arms with a mantle (Dutch: Koninklijk wapen), while the government of the Netherlands uses a smaller version without the mantle (cloak) or the pavilion; sometimes only the shield and crown are used (Dutch: Rijkswapen). The components of the coats of arms were regulated by Queen Wilhelmina in a royal decree of 10 July 1907, affirmed by Queen Juliana in a royal decree of 23 April 1980.

== Description ==
The blazon is as follows:

Azure, billetty Or a lion with a coronet Or armed and langued Gules holding in his dexter paw a sword Argent hilted Or and in the sinister paw seven arrows Argent pointed and bound together Or. (The seven arrows stand for the seven provinces of the Union of Utrecht.) The shield is crowned with the (Dutch) royal crown and supported by two lions Or armed and langued gules. They stand on a scroll Azure with the text (Or) "Je Maintiendrai" (pronounced [ʒə mɛ̃tjɛ̃dʁe], French for "I shall maintain".)

The monarch places this coat of arms on a mantle gules, lined with ermine. Above the mantle is a pavilion gules again, topped with the royal crown.

In the royal decree, it is stated that male successors may replace the crown on the shield with a helm with the crest of Nassau.

== History and origin of the coat of arms ==
This version of the coat of arms has been in use since 1907 but differs only slightly from the version that was adopted in 1815. From 1815 until 1907 all the lions wore the royal crown and the supporting lions were facing it.

The royal arms were adopted by the first king of the Kingdom of the Netherlands, William I, when he became king after the Congress of Vienna in 1815. As king, he adopted a coat of arms that combined elements of his family's (Orange-Nassau) coat of arms and that of the former Dutch Republic that existed from 1581 until 1795.

From his family arms he used the azure, billetty or with a lion rampant or of Nassau (blue shield, lion and billets). The "Je Maintiendrai" motto represents the Orange family since it came into the family with the princedom of Orange as "Je Maintiendrai Châlons". These elements are also found in the arms of King William III, who was also king of England, Scotland & Ireland (1689–1702). From the arms of the former States General of the Republic of the United Provinces, he took the lion with a coronet, sword and arrows. The arrows symbolize the seven provinces that made up the Republic, the sword the determination to defend their liberty, and the coronet their sovereignty. William replaced the coronet with a royal crown. In 1907, Queen Wilhelmina returned to an open coronet.

Royal arms of the United Kingdom of the Netherlands (1815–1907)

Royal standard of the Netherlands

1815 coat of arms with the "Walram-crest"

=== Counts of Nassau ===
Coat of arms of Nassau: Azure billetty or, a lion rampant of the last armed and langued gules

The arms of Nassau have existed since about 1250. There are two versions of the Nassau arms, representing the two main branches. This is a result of two brothers, count Walram II and count Otto I, agreeing to divide their father's (Henry II) lands between them in 1255. The line of Walram added a crown to the lion in the Nassau arms to make it different from the lion used by the line of Otto.

The kings and queens of the Netherlands are descendants of Count Otto. The Grand Dukes of Luxembourg are descendants of Count Walram. They also still use "Nassau" in their arms. Both lines are now extinct in the male line.

The helm and crest that can be used in the royal arms by the male successors to the throne (and is in fact being used by some male members of the royal family) are: "On a (ceremonial) helmet, with bars and decoration Or and mantling Azure and Or, issuing from a coronet Or, a pair of wings joined Sable each with an arched bend Argent charged with three leaves of the lime-tree stems upward Vert".

This crest is used by the descendants of Otto and differs from the crest used by the descendants of Walram. But in the royal decree of 1815 the crest issuing from a crown on the Dutch royal arms was the one used by the Walram line. Why this was done is uncertain. Maybe due to the "mistake" this crest was hardly used.

The crest of the Walram line is the following: Between two trunks Azure billetty Or a sitting lion Or. The trunks are probably a misinterpretation of two cow horns, a crest that is frequently used in German heraldry. On the grand coat of arms of the Grand Duke of Luxembourg, the lion is crowned, armed and langued gules.

=== The Princedom of Orange ===
The motto has been used by every "ruling" member of the Nassau family, who was also the prince of Orange since it came into the family with the Princedom of Orange in 1530. Count Henry III of Nassau-Breda, who was living in the Low Countries, was married to Claudia Orange-Châlon. Her brother, Philibert of Châlon, was the last Prince of Orange from the House of Châlon. When he died in 1530, Henry's and Claudia's son René of Nassau-Breda inherited the princedom on condition that he used the name and coat of arms of the Châlon family. History knows him, therefore, as René of Châlon. With this inheritance came the "Je Maintiendrai Châlons" motto into the Nassau family. René died in 1544 without leaving a child. His cousin William of Nassau-Dillenburg inherited all of René's lands. William became William of Orange (in English better known under his nickname William the Silent) and the founder of the House of Orange-Nassau. William first changed the motto to "Je Maintiendrai Nassau". Later he (or his sons) dropped the family name from the motto.

=== The Dutch Republic ===
The sword and arrows originated from the Habsburg rulers.

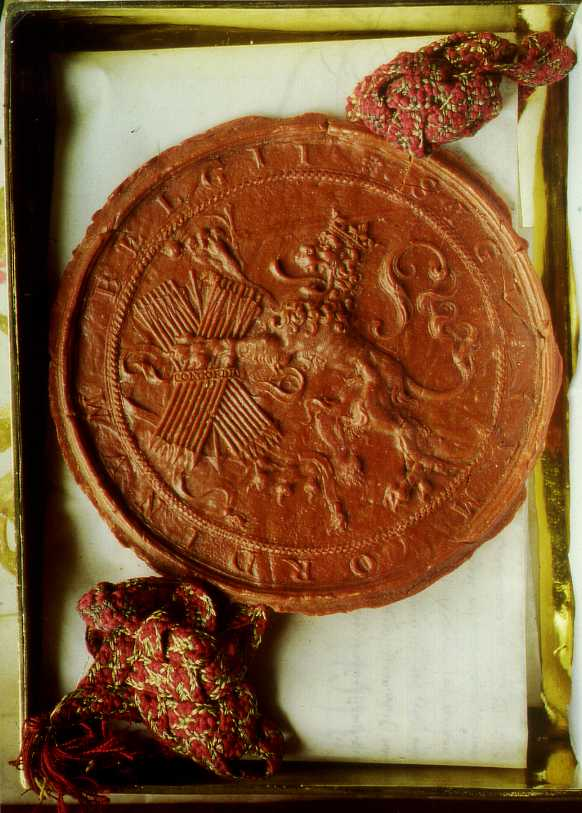
Great seal of the States General, 1578

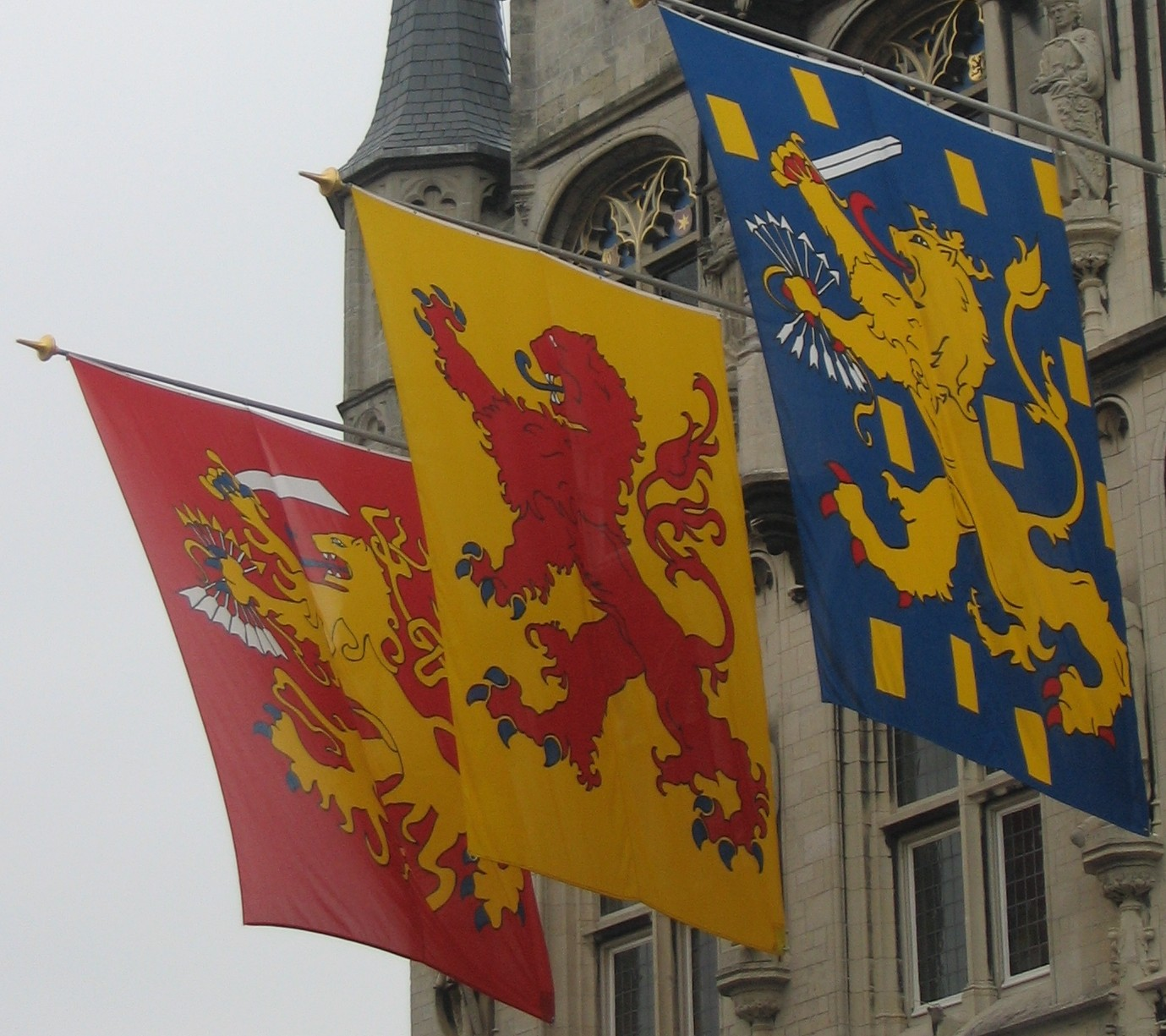
The banners of the Dutch Republic, the County of Holland and the Kingdom of the Netherlands, hanging from the city hall in Gouda

Arms of Dutch Republic

Arms of the Dutch Republic before 1665, considered too Holland-orientated.

Arms of the Dutch Republic after 1665

The lion, as representing the Burgundian Netherlands, first appears as a crest on the tomb of Philip the Handsome. Later Charles V added the sword. The arrows were used on coins etc. since the early 16th century to represent the Seventeen Provinces in the Low Countries under the control of Charles V. In 1578, during the Eighty Years' War, the States General ordered a new great seal representing the lion, the sword and the 17 arrows combined. Although only seven provinces remained free from Spain, this seal stayed in use until 1795.

After the completion of its forming in 1584, the Republic of the Seven United Provinces used as its arms: Or a crowned lion Gules armed and langued Azure, holding in his dexter paw a sword and in the sinister paw seven arrows tight together Azure. The colours of this version were derived from the most important of the seven provinces, the county of Holland (its arms are still in use since being adopted by the counts of Holland c. 1198).

After c. 1668 the colours were reversed, and the arms became Gules a crowned lion Or armed and langued Azure holding in his dexter paw a sword Argent hilted Or and in the sinister paw seven arrows Argent pointed and tight together Or.

The arrows symbolize the seven provinces that made up the Republic, the sword the determination to defend their liberty, and the coronet their sovereignty.

=== 1795–1815 Revolution, Napoleonic years and Restoration ===
In 1795, with French help, the last stadtholder, William V, was forced to flee, and the Batavian Republic (1795–1806) was proclaimed. At first this had no influence on the use of the arms of the former Republic. Then in the following year the lion, which had served for approximately 280 years, was replaced by an allegoric image of a "Dutch maiden of freedom". In 1802 the Batavian Republic reverted to the Republican lion, although it does not carry seven arrows.

With the replacement of the Batavian Republic with the Kingdom of Holland (1806–1810), the lion of the States General was again adopted. Louis Napoleon Bonaparte (brother of the French Emperor Napoleon) used as King Louis I a coat of arms that quartered the Dutch lion with the French imperial eagle. After the emperor Napoleon abolished the Kingdom of Holland in 1810, the lion again had to leave the stage, and the Imperial Eagle was the only image in use.

In 1813 the French were forced out of the Netherlands, and the son of the last stadtholder, William VI/I, was proclaimed 'Sovereign Prince' (1813–1815). To symbolize his new status, he assumed a new coat of arms. In it the old lion with the sword and arrows made his second reappearance, now with a royal crown upon his head. Again, it was placed in the prime locations of a quartered shield (I and IV quarters). The II and III quarters were the arms of Châlon-Orange-Geneve. The arms of Nassau (Otto) were placed on an escutcheon in the center of the shield.

The final retirement of the Republican lion came in 1815 with the establishment of the "United Kingdom of the Netherlands". Because this new kingdom comprised not only the lands of the former Dutch Republic but also of the former Austrian or Southern Netherlands, it was also not appropriate to continue the use of the old arms. First a combination with the arms of Brabant (Sable a Lion Or, now the coat of arms of Belgium) was considered. In the end the attributes, the sword, arrows and crown, were placed in the care of his older "colleague" from Nassau to symbolize the union between the (now Royal) House of Nassau and the Netherlands. As seen above, this is still the basis of the current coat of arms.

Dutch maiden of freedom as used on naval flags, 1797–1806

Seal of the Batavian Republic, 1796–1802

Seal of the Batavian Commonwealth, 1802–1806

Coat of arms of the Kingdom of Holland, second design

Coat of arms of William I as "sovereign prince", 1813–1815

== Versions and variants ==
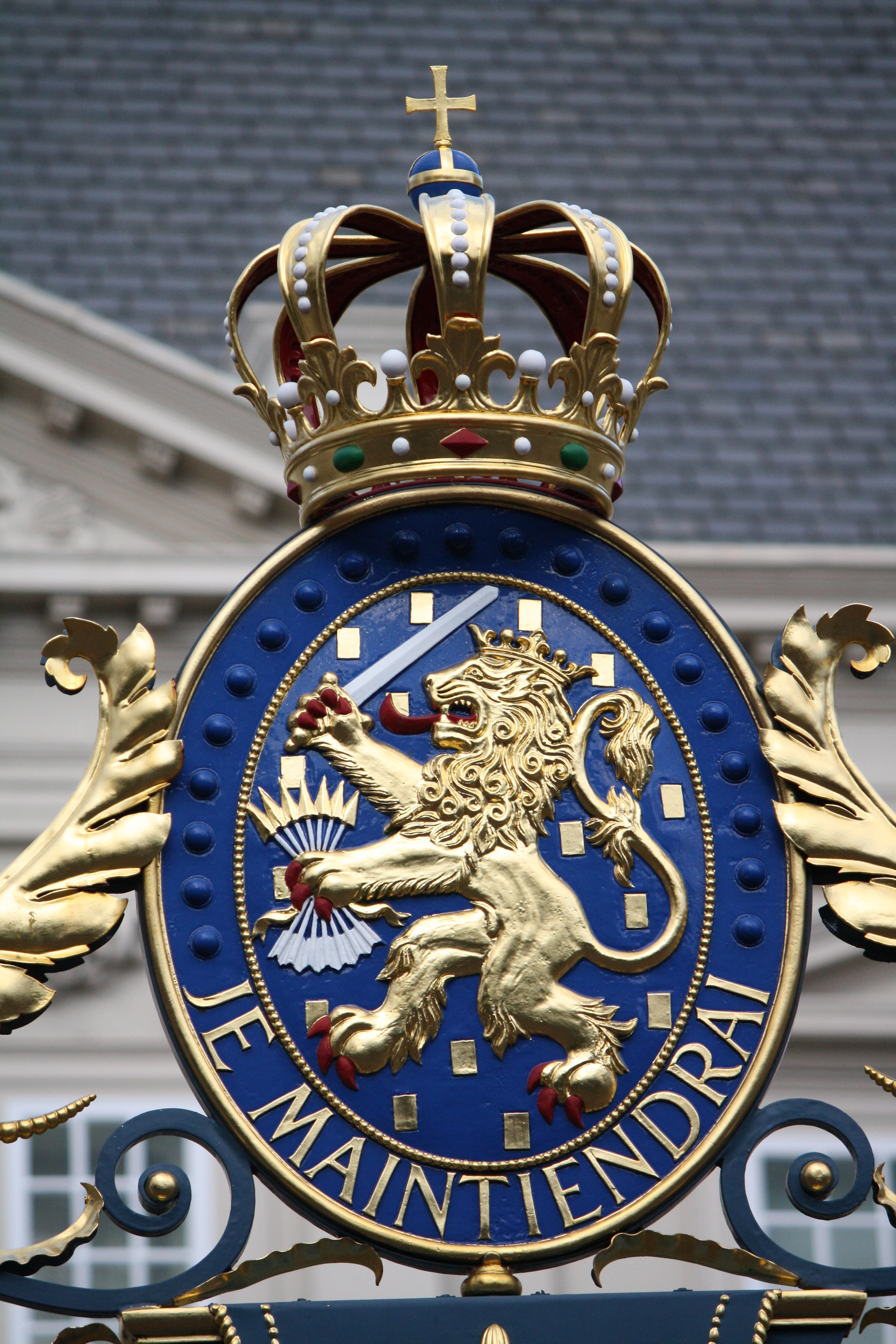
The royal arms displayed in The Hague

=== Government ===
Various versions of the Dutch royal arms are used by the government, the parliament and courts. Government and its agencies generally use a simplified version of the royal arms (Dutch: Rijkslogo) without the mantle, the pavilion and the topped royal crown. This simplified royal arms also features on the cover of passports, embassies and consulates. The versions used by the legislature and its chambers show the royal arms with the royal crown and a buckled dark-blue strap that bears the name of the parliament or each chamber, Staten-Generaal (States General), Eerste Kamer der Staten-Generaal (Senate), and Tweede Kamer der Staten-Generaal (House of Representatives) in gold letters surrounding the shield.

Version used by the Dutch government

Stylized version used as a logotype by all branches of the Dutch government
Version used by the States General (parliament)

Version used by the Senate

Version used by the House of Representatives

=== Royal family ===
Members of the Dutch royal family receive their own personalised arms which are based on the royal arms. For more details see Wapen van Nassau, Tak van Otto (in Dutch).

Coats of arms of the Dutch royal family
Coat of arms		Bearer	Details
Full achievement	Escutcheon	Bearer	Details
		Queen Máxima	An oval shield-shaped (usually borne by women) quartering of the Dutch royal arms with Orange; over all an escutcheon with the arms of Zorreguieta (paternal arms): Or, two poplar trees proper flanking a triple-towered castle Gules, ondoyant to the gate of the castle a river Azure.
		Children of King Willem-Alexander (Princesses Catharina-Amalia, Alexia and Ariane)	A quartering of the Dutch royal arms with Orange; over all an escutcheon with the arms of Zorreguieta (maternal arms).
		Children of Princess Beatrix (Prince Constantijn)	A quartering of the Dutch royal arms with Orange; over all an escutcheon with the arms of the House of Amsberg (paternal arms): Vert, a triple-towered castle argent, on a mount Or.
		Princess Beatrix	A quartering of the Dutch royal arms with Orange; over all an escutcheon with the arms of the House of Lippe (paternal arms): Argent, a rose Gules barbed and seeded Or.
		Children of Queen/Princess Juliana (Princesses Irene, Margriet and Christina)	An oval shield-shaped, a quartering of the Dutch royal arms with Orange; over all an escutcheon with the arms of the House of Lippe (paternal arms).
		Children of Princess Margriet (Princes Maurits, Bernhard, Pieter-Christiaan and Floris)	A quartering of the Dutch royal arms with Orange; over all an escutcheon with the arms of the House of Vollenhoven (paternal arms): Azure, a six-pointed star Argent impaling Or, a deer Gules supported on a tree, the tree on a Mount Vert.

== See also ==
- Armorial of the Netherlands
- Dutch Republic Lion
