= Flag of Sint Maarten =

Sint Maarten
- Use: Civil and state flag, state ensign
- Proportion: 2:3
- Adopted: 13 June 1985; 41 years ago
- Design: A white triangle situated at the hoist charged with the constituent country's coat of arms, along with two horizontal bands of red and blue.
- Designed by: Roselle Richardson
- Use: Governor's standard

The flag of Sint Maarten consists of a white triangle situated at the hoist charged with the constituent country's coat of arms, along with two horizontal bands of cherry red and navy blue. Adopted in 1985 shortly after the territory was granted a coat of arms, it has been the flag of Sint Maarten since 13 June of that year. Since the dissolution of the Netherlands Antilles on 10 October 2010, it has been the sole flag used in the constituent country.

== History ==
The island of Saint Martin was first spotted by Christopher Columbus on 11 November 1493 during his second voyage to the West Indies, and was named after Martin of Tours, whose feast day coincided with the sighting. Sovereignty over the island changed hands between the Spanish, Dutch, and French over the next century. This continued until 1648, when the Dutch Republic and France signed the Treaty of Concordia to partition the island.

Sint Maarten became part of the Dutch West Indies federation in 1828. It joined five other Dutch island dependencies that eventually formed the Netherlands Antilles in 1954. Five years later, the constituent country was granted its own flag. Sint Maarten was accorded its own distinct coat of arms in November 1982, and subsequently held a contest in August of the following year to design a separate flag. The new banner, designed by Roselle Richardson, was adopted by the government on 13 June 1985. It became the only flag utilised in Sint Maarten when the Netherlands Antilles dissolved on 10 October 2010 and Sint Maarten became a constituent country of the Kingdom of the Netherlands in its own right.

== Design ==
=== Symbolism ===
The colours and symbols of the flag carry cultural, political, and regional meanings. The blue represents the sea and the sky, while the red epitomises the blood of Sint Maarteners. The green on the coat of arms stands for the fertility of the land, while the yellow represents the energy of the islanders. The orange encircling the shield, along with its light blue field, allude to the colours of the Dutch monarchy. The shield depicts a garland of yellow sage – the official flower of the territory – as well as the Constitutional Court of Sint Maarten in Philipsburg and (top right) the Dutch–French friendship monument delineating the boundary between the Dutch and French sections of the island. The crest consists of a pelican in front of a yellow sun, while the motto in Latin on a ribbon scroll under the escutcheon – Semper progrediens – means 'always progressing'.

Taken altogether, the flag's dominant colours of red, white, and blue evoke the flag of the Netherlands, Sint Maarten's mother country. They are also identical to the colours of the flag of France, which has sovereignty over the northern part of the island of Saint Martin.

=== Wrong colours ===
Although the government indeed uses the flag with the arms with a red bordure, it should be an orange bordure. The decree regarding the flag refers to the coat of arms, which according to the island decree of 1982 shows an orange bordure.

=== Similarities ===
The Sint Maartener flag bears a likeness to the war flag of the Philippines. Both banners employ a white triangle situated at the hoist, with a red horizontal band at the top and a blue horizontal band at the bottom.

== Variants ==
The standard of the constituent country's governor features red, white, and blue horizontal bands at the upper and lower portions defaced with an orange-edged light blue circle depicting a white courthouse on a white band at the centre.

Variant flag of Sint Maarten
Variant flag	Usage
	Standard of the governor of Sint Maarten

== See also ==
- Coat of arms of Sint Maarten
- Flag of the Collectivity of Saint Martin
- Flag of the Netherlands Antilles (larger body to which Sint Maarten belonged until 2010.)
- Unification of Saint Martin (and its cultural flag)
