= Coat of arms of the Netherlands Antilles =

Or, 6 mullets of 6 Azure. A bordure Gules.

Or, 5 mullets of 5 Azure. A bordure Gules.

The coat of arms of the Netherlands Antilles consisted of a shield, a crown and the motto. The shield itself showed five blue stars on a golden background, within a red border. These five stars stood for the five islands of the Netherlands Antilles and also were represented in the flag. The crown atop the shield was that of the Dutch sovereign. Under the shield was a ribbon with the motto: Libertate Unanimus ("United in Freedom").

The ultimate coat of arms was adopted on 1 January 1986, the day that Aruba separated from the Netherlands Antilles and acquired a status aparte within the Kingdom of the Netherlands. This coat of arms replaced the previous version, which had been in use since 23 October 1964 and contained six stars: again one for each island including Aruba.

The arms were made redundant after the dissolution of the Netherlands Antilles on 10 October 2010.

== Sources ==
- Flags of the World: Netherlands Antilles coat of arms
- Heraldry of the World: Netherlands Antilles
