= List of coats of arms =

Coats of arms are commonly possessed by nations, regions, cities, royal and noble personages, and sometimes by other entities.

== Entities ==
=== Corporate ===
- United Kingdom
  - Coat of arms of the BBC
  - City of London Livery Companies
    - Coat of arms of the Drapers Company, the Worshipful Company of Drapers
  - Supermarkets
    - Marks & Spencer
    - Tesco

=== Education ===
- Canada
  - Coat of arms of McGill University
  - Coat of arms of the University of Toronto

== Governmental ==
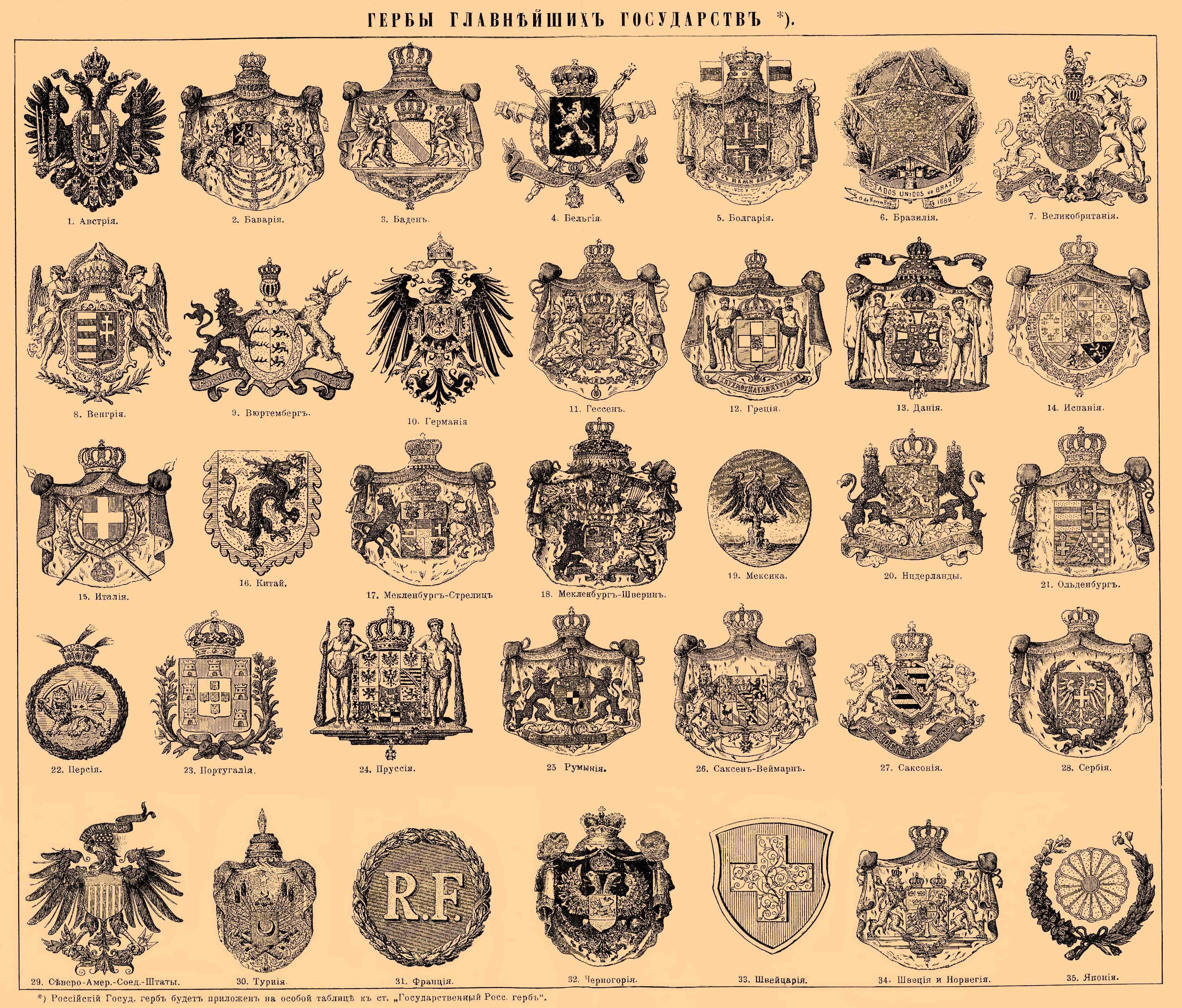

- Emblem of Afghanistan
- Coat of arms of Albania
- Emblem of Algeria
- Coat of arms of Andorra
- Coat of arms of Angola
- Coat of arms of Argentina
- Coat of arms of Armenia
- Coat of arms of Aruba
- Coat of arms of Australia
  - Coat of arms of Australian Capital Territory
  - Coat of arms of the Northern Territory
  - Coat of arms of Queensland
  - Coat of arms of South Australia
  - Coat of arms of Victoria
  - Coat of arms of Western Australia
  - Coat of arms of New South Wales
    - Coat of arms of Sydney
  - Coat of arms of Tasmania
- Coat of arms of Austria
- Coat of arms of the Bahamas
- Emblem of Bahrain
- National Emblem of Bangladesh
- Coat of arms of Barbados
- National emblem of Belarus
- Coat of arms of Belgium
- Coat of arms of Belize
- Coat of arms of Dewsbury
- Coat of arms of Bosnia and Herzegovina
  - Coat of arms of the Federation of Bosnia and Herzegovina
  - Coat of arms of Republika Srpska
  - Coat of arms of Sarajevo
- Coat of arms of Brazil
- Emblem of Brunei
- Coat of arms of Bulgaria
  - Coat of arms of Sofia
- Coat of arms of Canada
  - Coat of arms of Alberta
    - Coat of arms of Calgary
    - Coat of arms of Edmonton
  - Coat of arms of British Columbia
    - Coat of arms of Abbotsford
    - Coat of arms of Burnaby
    - Coat of arms of Coquitlam
    - Coat of arms of New Westminster
    - Coat of arms of Port Coquitlam
    - Coat of arms of Port Moody
    - Coat of arms of Vancouver
    - Coat of arms of Victoria
  - Coat of arms of Manitoba
    - Coat of arms of Winnipeg
  - Coat of arms of New Brunswick
  - Coat of arms of Newfoundland and Labrador
    - Coat of arms of St. John's
  - Coat of arms of Nova Scotia
    - Coat of arms of the Halifax Regional Municipality
  - Coat of arms of Ontario
    - Coat of arms of Barrie
    - Coat of arms of Ottawa
    - Coat of arms of Peterborough
    - Coat of arms of St. Thomas
    - Coat of arms of St. Catharines
    - Coat of arms of Toronto
    - Coat of arms of Windsor
  - Coat of arms of Prince Edward Island
    - Coat of arms of Charlottetown
  - Coat of arms of Quebec
    - Coat of arms of Montreal
    - Coat of arms of Quebec City
  - Coat of arms of Saskatchewan
    - Coat of arms of Regina
  - Coat of arms of the Northwest Territories
    - Coat of arms of Yellowknife
  - Coat of arms of Nunavut
  - Coat of arms of Yukon
    - Coat of arms of Whitehorse
- Coat of arms of Chile
- Emblem of the Republic of China
- National Emblem of the People's Republic of China
  - Emblem of Hong Kong
  - Emblem of Macau
- Coat of arms of Colombia
- Coat of arms of Croatia
- Coat of arms of Cuba
  - Seal of Havana
- Coat of arms of Cyprus
- Coat of arms of the Czech Republic
- Coat of arms of Denmark
  - Coat of arms of the Faroe Islands
  - Coat of arms of Greenland
- Coat of arms of Dominica
- Coat of arms of the Dominican Republic
- Coat of arms of Egypt
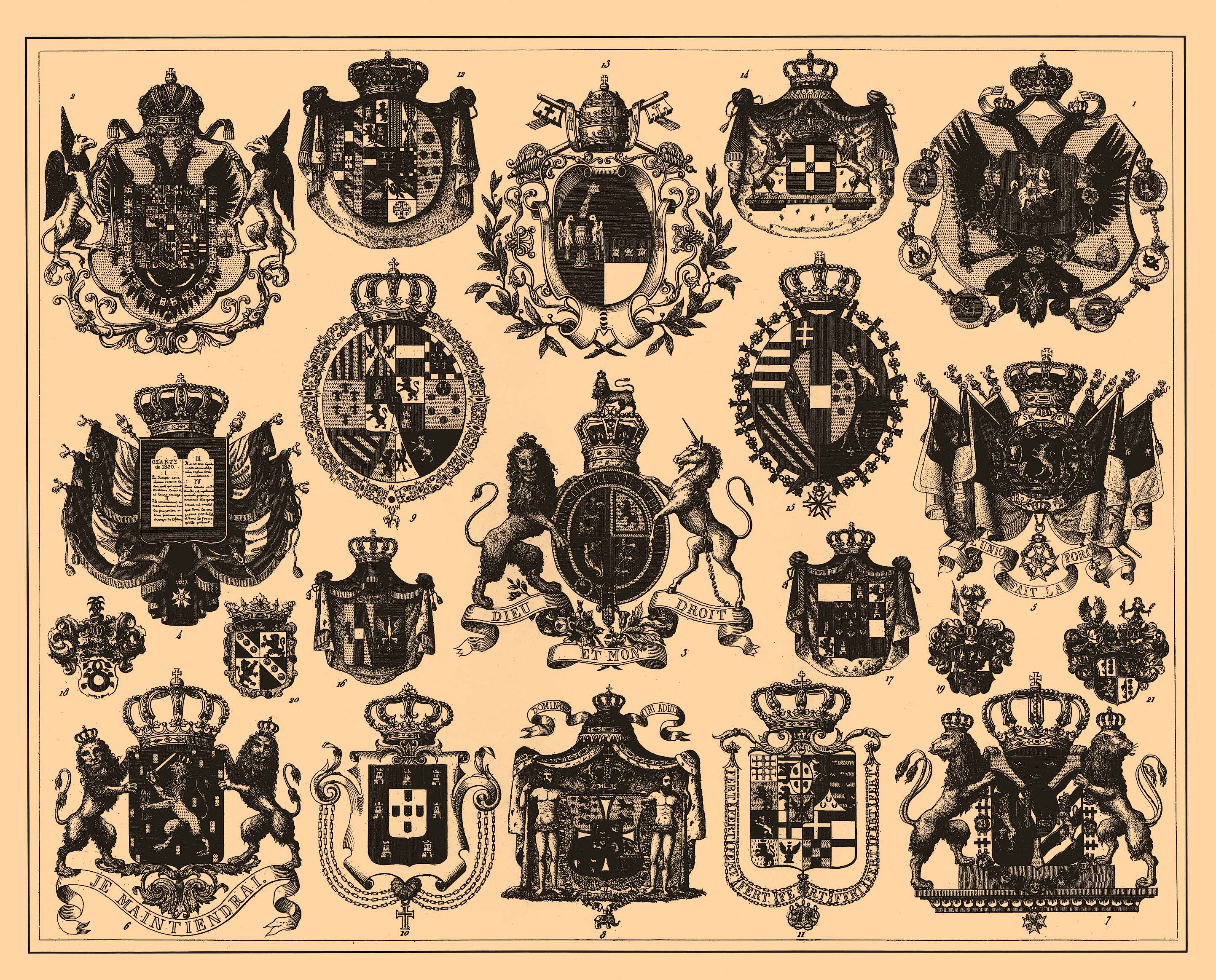
- Coat of arms of Eritrea
- Coat of arms of Estonia
- Emblem of Ethiopia
- Coat of arms of Fiji
- Coat of arms of Finland
  - Coat of arms of Åland
- Diplomatic emblem of France
  - Coat of arms of French Polynesia
  - Coat of arms of Mayotte
  - Emblem of New Caledonia
  - Coat of arms of Saint Pierre and Miquelon
  - Coat of arms of Wallis and Futuna
  - Coat of arms of Paris
- Coat of arms of Georgia
- Coat of arms of Germany
  - Coat of arms of Baden-Württemberg
  - Coat of arms of Bavaria
    - Coat of arms of Munich
  - Coat of arms of Brandenburg
    - Coat of arms of Berlin
  - Coat of arms of Bremen
  - Coat of arms of Hamburg
  - Coat of arms of Hesse
  - Coat of arms of Lower Saxony
  - Coat of arms of Mecklenburg-Vorpommern
  - Coat of arms of North Rhine-Westphalia
  - Coat of arms of Rhineland-Palatinate
    - List of coats of arms of the districts in Rhineland-Palatinate
  - Coat of arms of Saarland
  - Coat of arms of Saxony
    - Coat of arms of Dresden
  - Coat of arms of Saxony-Anhalt
  - Coat of arms of Schleswig-Holstein
  - Coat of arms of Thuringia
- Coat of arms of Ghana
- Coat of arms of Greece
  - Emblem of Greek Macedonia
- Coat of arms of Grenada
- Coat of arms of Haiti
- Coat of arms of Hungary
- Coat of arms of Iceland
- State emblem of India
  - Emblem of Arunachal Pradesh
  - Emblem of Karnataka
  - Emblem of Kerala
  - Emblem of Mumbai
  - Emblem of Sikkim
- National emblem of Indonesia
- Emblem of Iran
- Coat of arms of Iraq
- Coat of arms of Ireland
- Emblem of Israel
  - Emblem of Jerusalem
- Coat of arms of Italy
- Coat of arms of Ivory Coast
- Coat of arms of Jamaica
- Japan - The Imperial Seal of Japan is also called the coat of arms of Japan
- Coat of arms of Jordan
- Coat of arms of Kazakhstan
- Coat of arms of Kenya
- Emblem of Kuwait
- Coat of arms of Latvia
- Coat of arms of Liberia
- Coat of arms of Libya
- Coat of arms of Liechtenstein
- Coat of arms of Lithuania
- Coat of arms of Luxembourg
- Coat of arms of Madagascar
- Coat of arms of Malaysia
- Coat of arms of Mali
- Coat of arms of Malta
- Coat of arms of Mauritius
- Coat of arms of Mexico
  - Seal of Guadalajara
- Coat of arms of Moldova
- Coat of arms of Monaco
- Coat of arms of Montenegro
- Coat of arms of Morocco
- Coat of arms of Namibia
- Coat of arms of the Netherlands
  - Coat of arms of Amsterdam
  - Coat of arms of the Netherlands Antilles
- Coat of arms of New Zealand
  - Coat of arms of Niue
  - Coat of arms of the Cook Islands
- Coat of arms of Nigeria
- Emblem of North Korea
- Coat of arms of North Macedonia
- Coat of arms of Norway
  - List of coats of arms of Norway
- National emblem of Oman
- Coat of arms of Pakistan
- Coat of arms of Palestine
- Coat of arms of Peru
- Coat of arms of the Philippines
  - Seal of Bangsamoro
- Coat of arms of Poland
  - Coat of arms of Kraków
  - Coat of arms of Warsaw
  - Coat of arms of Wrocław
- Coat of arms of Portugal
  - Coat of arms of Lisbon
  - Coat of arms of Madeira
  - Coat of arms of the Azores
- Emblem of Qatar
- Coat of arms of Romania
  - Coat of arms of Bucharest
- Coat of arms of Russia
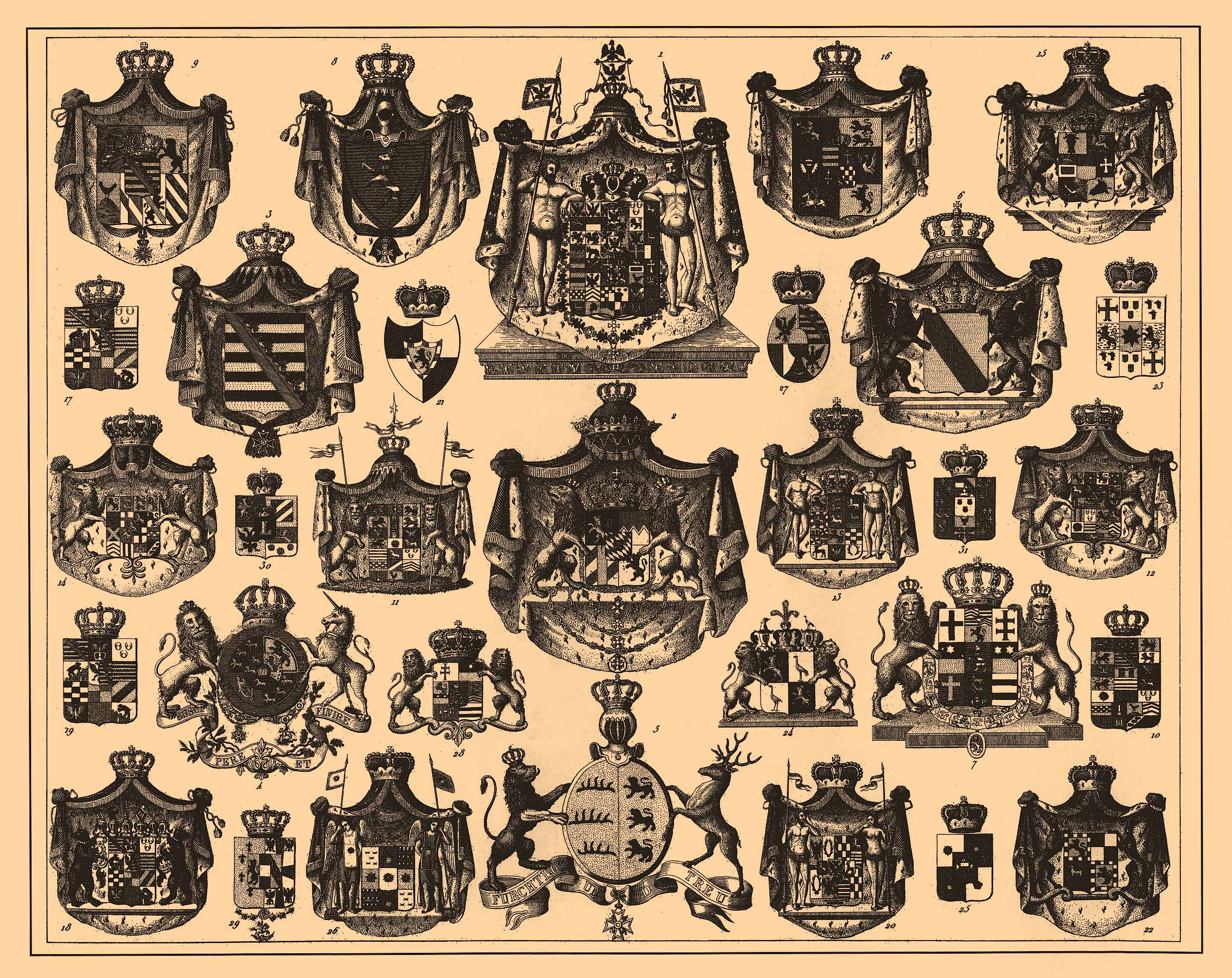
  - Coat of arms of Adygea
  - Altai (image only)
  - Coat of arms of Bashkortostan
  - Emblem of Buryatia
  - Chechnya (image only)
  - Coat of arms of Crimea
  - Chuvashia (image only)
  - Coat of arms of Dagestan
  - Coat of arms of Ingushetia
  - Kabardino-Balkaria (image only)
  - Coat of arms of Kalmykia
  - Karachay-Cherkessia (image only)
  - Coat of arms of the Republic of Karelia
  - Khakassia (image only)
  - Coat of arms of the Komi Republic
  - Mari El (image only)
  - Mordovia (image only)
  - Coat of arms of North Ossetia-Alania
  - Sakha (image only)
  - Coat of arms of Tatarstan
  - Coat of arms of Tuva
  - Coat of arms of Udmurtia
  - Coat of arms of Moscow
- Coat of arms of Samoa
- Coat of arms of San Marino
- Coat of arms of Saudi Arabia
- Coat of arms of Serbia
  - Coat of arms of Vojvodina
  - Coat of arms of Belgrade
  - Coat of arms of Novi Sad
  - Coat of arms of Prijepolje
- Coat of arms of Singapore
- Coat of arms of Slovakia
- Coat of arms of Slovenia
- Coat of arms of South Africa
  - Coat of arms of South Africa (1910–2000)
- Emblem of South Korea
- Coat of arms of South Sudan
- Coat of arms of Spain
  - Emblem of Andalusia
  - Coat of arms of Aragon
  - Coat of arms of Asturias
  - Coat of arms of the Balearic Islands
  - Coat of arms of Basque Country
  - Coat of arms of the Canary Islands
  - Coat of arms of Cantabria
  - Coat of arms of Castile-La Mancha
    - Coat of arms of Toledo
  - Coat of arms of Castile-León
  - Coat of arms of Catalonia
    - Coat of arms of Barcelona
  - Coat of arms of Ceuta
  - Coat of arms of Extremadura
  - Coat of arms of Galicia
  - Coat of arms of the Community of Madrid
    - Coat of arms of Madrid (city)
  - Coat of arms of Melilla
  - Coat of arms of the Region of Murcia
  - Coat of arms of Navarre
  - Coat of arms of La Rioja
  - Coat of arms of the Valencian Community
  - Coat of arms of the Crown of Aragon (historical)
  - Coat of arms of the Kingdom, Crown and Historical Region of Castile (historical)
  - Coat of arms of the Kingdom and Historical Region of León (historical)
- Coat of arms of Sri Lanka
- Coat of arms of Sweden
- Coat of arms of Switzerland
- Coat of arms of Syria
- Coat of arms of Tanzania
- Emblem of Thailand
- Coat of arms of Tonga
- Coat of arms of Trinidad and Tobago
- Coat of arms of Tunisia
- Unofficial emblem of Turkey
- Coat of arms of Uganda
- Coat of arms of Ukraine
- Emblem of the United Arab Emirates
- Royal arms of Cambodia
- Royal coat of arms of the United Kingdom (distinct variant used in Scotland; see also royal coat of arms of Scotland)
  - Royal arms of England
    - List of arms of the county councils of England
      - Coat of arms of London County Council
      - Coat of arms of the Isle of Wight
      - Coat of arms of Greater Manchester
      - Coat of arms of West Yorkshire
    - London
      - Coat of arms of the City of London
      - Coat of arms of the London Borough of Barking and Dagenham
      - Coat of arms of the London Borough of Barnet
      - Coat of arms of the London Borough of Bexley
      - Coat of arms of the London Borough of Brent
      - Coat of arms of the London Borough of Bromley
      - Coat of arms of the London Borough of Camden
      - Coat of arms of the London Borough of Croydon
      - Coat of arms of the London Borough of Ealing
      - Coat of arms of the London Borough of Enfield
      - Coat of arms of the London Borough of Hackney
      - Coat of arms of the London Borough of Hammersmith and Fulham
      - Coat of arms of the London Borough of Haringey
      - Coat of arms of the London Borough of Harrow
      - Coat of arms of the London Borough of Hillingdon
      - Coat of arms of the Royal Borough of Greenwich
    - Coats of arms of metropolitan district councils of England
      - Coat of arms of Bradford
      - Coat of arms of Calderdale
      - Coat of arms of Kirklees
      - Coat of arms of Leeds
      - Coat of arms of Sunderland
      - Coat of arms of Wakefield
      - Coat of arms of Wigan
      - Symbols of Manchester
    - Coats of arms of non-metropolitan district councils
      - Coat of arms of Barrow-in-Furness
      - Coat of arms of Colchester
      - Coat of arms of Oxford
    - Coats of arms of unitary authority councils of England
      - Coat of arms of the Isle of Wight
      - Coat of arms of Poole
      - Coat of arms of York
    - Coat of arms of Birmingham
    - Coat of arms of Liverpool
  - Royal arms of Scotland
  - Coat of arms of Northern Ireland
  - Royal Badge of Wales
    - Coat of arms of Newport
  - Overseas Territories
    - Coat of arms of Anguilla
    - Coat of arms of Bermuda
    - Coat of arms of the British Antarctic Territory
    - Coat of arms of the British Indian Ocean Territory
    - Coat of arms of the British Virgin Islands
    - Coat of arms of the Cayman Islands
    - Coat of arms of the Falkland Islands
    - Coat of arms of Gibraltar
    - Coat of arms of Montserrat
    - Coat of arms of the Pitcairn Islands
    - Coat of arms of Saint Helena, Ascension and Tristan da Cunha
      - Coat of arms of Ascension Island
      - Coat of arms of Saint Helena
      - Coat of arms of Tristan da Cunha
    - Coat of arms of South Georgia and the South Sandwich Islands
  - Crown Dependencies
    - Coat of arms of Guernsey
      - Alderney (image only)
      - Sark (image only)
      - Herm (image only)
    - Coat of arms of Jersey
    - Coat of arms of the Isle of Man
- United States - The obverse of the Great Seal of the United States contains the coat of arms of the United States.
  - Seal of Alabama
    - Coat of arms of Alabama
  - Seal of Alaska
  - Seal of Arizona
  - Seal of Arkansas
  - Seal of California
    - Seal of City of Los Angeles
  - Seal of Colorado
  - Seal of Connecticut
    - Coat of arms of Connecticut
  - Seal of Delaware
  - Seal of Florida
  - Seal of Georgia
  - Seal of Hawaii
  - Seal of Idaho
  - Seal of Illinois
    - Chicago (image only)
  - Seal of Indiana
  - Seal of Iowa
  - Seal of Kansas
  - Seal of Kentucky
  - Seal of Louisiana
  - Seal of Maine
  - Seal of Maryland
  - Seal of Massachusetts
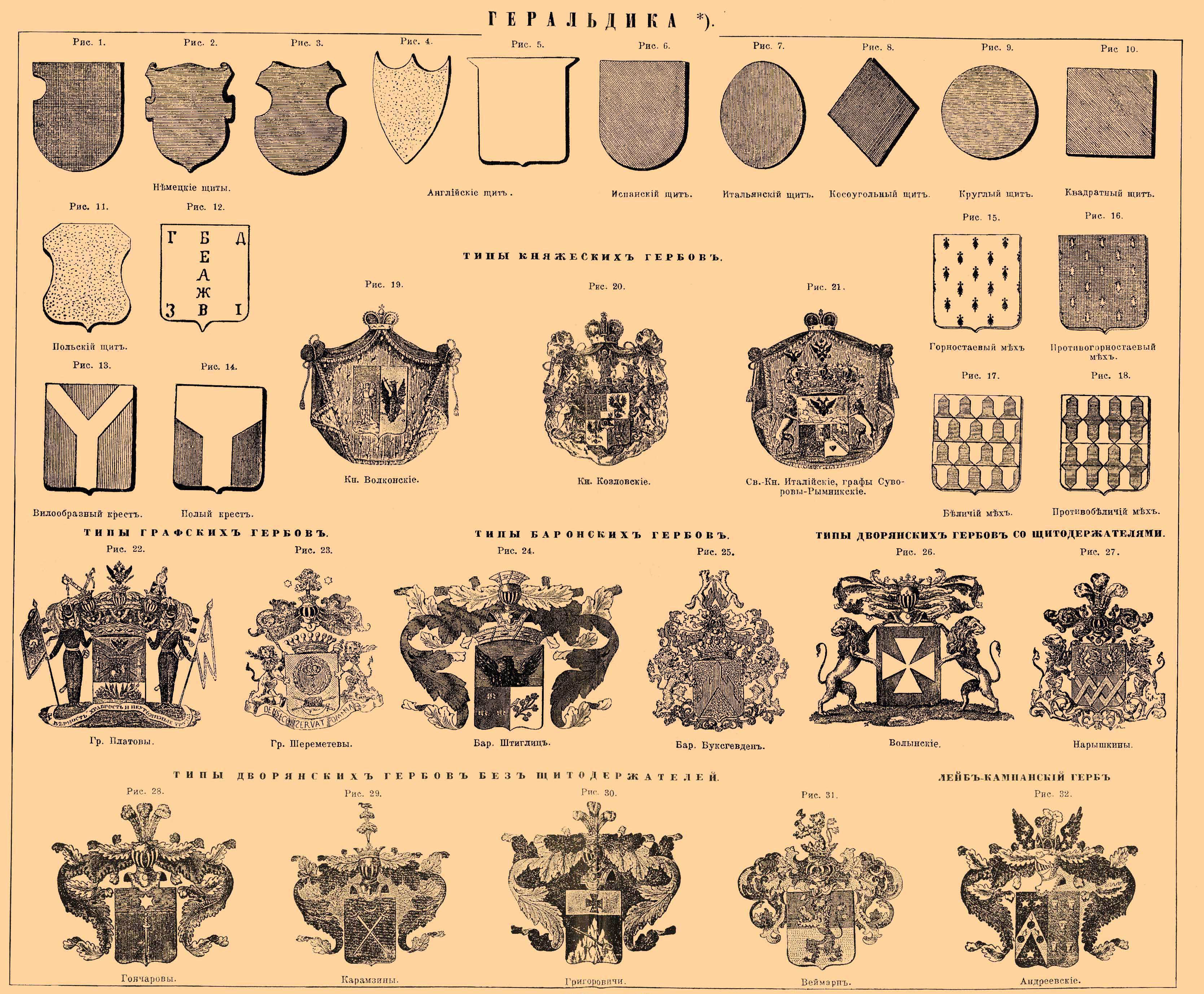
  - Seal of Michigan
  - Seal of Minnesota
  - Seal of Mississippi
    - Coat of arms of Mississippi
  - Seal of Missouri
  - Seal of Montana
  - Seal of Nebraska
  - Seal of Nevada
  - Seal of New Hampshire
  - Seal of New Jersey
  - Seal of New Mexico
  - Seal of New York
    - Coat of arms of New York
    - Seal of New York City
  - Seal of North Carolina
  - Seal of North Dakota
    - Coat of arms of North Dakota
  - Seal of Ohio
  - Seal of Oklahoma
  - Seal of Oregon
  - Seal of Pennsylvania
    - Coat of arms of Pennsylvania
    - Philadelphia (image only)
  - Seal of Rhode Island
  - Seal of South Carolina
  - Seal of South Dakota
  - Seal of Tennessee
  - Seal of Texas
  - Seal of Utah
  - Seal of Vermont
    - Coat of arms of Vermont
  - Seal of Virginia
  - Seal of Washington
  - Seal of West Virginia
  - Seal of Wisconsin
  - Seal of Wyoming
  - Seal of the District of Columbia
  - Seal of American Samoa
  - Seal of Guam
  - Seal of the Northern Mariana Islands
  - Seal of Puerto Rico
  - Seal of the United States Virgin Islands
- Coat of arms of the Holy See
- Coat of arms of Vatican City
- Coat of arms of Venezuela
  - Armorial of Venezuela
- Emblem of Vietnam
- Emblem of Yemen
- Coat of arms of Zimbabwe

=== Former states ===
- Coat of arms of Artsakh
- Coat of arms of the Socialist Federal Republic of Yugoslavia
  - Coats of arms of the Yugoslav Socialist Republics
- Coat of arms of the Soviet Union
  - Coats of arms of the Soviet Republics

=== Former dependencies ===
- Coat of arms of British Hong Kong
- Coat of arms of Portuguese Macau

== Positions ==
- Denmark
  - Coat of arms of the Queen
  - Coat of arms of the Crown Prince
  - Coat of arms of Prince Joachim
  - Coat of arms of the Crown Princess
  - Coat of arms of Princess Marie
- Luxembourg
  - Coat of arms of the Grand Duke
  - Coat of arms of the Hereditary Grand Duke
- The Netherlands
  - Coat of arms of the Queen
  - Coat of arms of the Princess of Orange
  - Coat of arms of Princesses Alexia and Ariane
  - Coat of arms of Princess Beatrix
  - Coat of arms of Prince Constantijn
  - Coat of arms of Princesses Irene, Margriet and Christina
  - Coat of arms of Princes Maurits, Bernhard, Pieter-Christiaan and Floris
- Norway
  - Coat of arms of the King
  - Coat of arms of the Crown Prince
- Spain
  - Coat of arms of the King
  - Coat of arms of the Princess of Asturias
  - Coat of arms of King Juan Carlos
- Philippines
  - Seal of the President of the Philippines
  - Seal of the Vice President of the Philippines
- The Commonwealth
  - Coat of arms of the King
  - Coat of arms of the Queen
  - Coat of arms of the Prince of Wales
  - Coat of arms of the Princess of Wales
  - Coat of arms of the Duke of Sussex
  - Coat of arms of the Duchess of Sussex
  - Coat of arms of the Princess Royal
  - Coat of arms of the Duke of Edinburgh
  - Coat of arms of the Duchess of Edinburgh
  - Coat of arms of Princess Beatrice
  - Coat of arms of Princess Eugenie
  - Coat of arms of the Duke of Gloucester
  - Coat of arms of the Duchess of Gloucester
  - Coat of arms of the Duke of Kent
  - Coat of arms of Princess Alexandra
  - Coat of arms of Prince Michael of Kent
  - Coat of arms of Princess Michael of Kent
- United States
  - Seal of the president of the United States
    - List of personal coats of arms of presidents of the United States
  - Seal of the vice president of the United States
    - List of personal coats of arms of vice presidents of the United States
- Vatican City, Holy See, and Catholic Church
  - Coat of arms of Francis
    - Former papal coats of arms

== Family ==
- Carpenter
- Daniel Perrin
- House Drăguț
- De la Cerda
- Mariñelarena

== See also ==
- List of oldest heraldry
- National emblems
