= Coat of arms of Dewsbury =

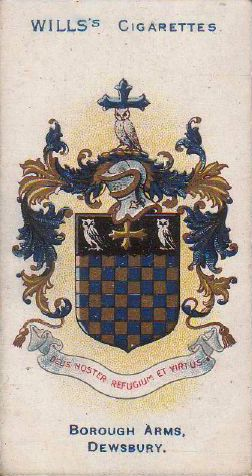
Cigarette card, showing Dewebury coat of arms, before 1914

The coat of arms of Dewsbury was the official symbol of the county borough of Dewsbury in the West Riding of Yorkshire. The county borough was abolished in 1974 under the provisions of the Local Government Act 1972 and replaced by Kirklees Metropolitan Council and West Yorkshire Metropolitan County Council.

== Description ==
The arms were granted by the College of Arms on 24 February 1893.

The elements of the arms and the crest refer to various local families: the chequy field refers to the Earls de Warenne; the crosses are from the Copley arms and the owls, as also in the coat of arms of Leeds, from the arms of Savile.

The motto is taken from Psalm 46, and is Latin for "God is our refuge and strength".

== Blazon ==
The formal description, or blazon, of the arms is:

Chequy or and azure, on a chief engrailed sable a cross patonce of the first between two owls argent. Crest: On a Wreath of the colours in front of a cross patonce fitchy azure an owl as in the arms. Motto: 'DEUS NOSTER REFUGIUM ET VIRTUS'.

== See also ==
- Coat of arms of the West Riding of Yorkshire
- Coat of arms of West Yorkshire
- Coat of arms of Kirklees
