= Leeds Volunteer Corps =

Line infantry regiment of the British Volunteers Corps

- 1801 portrait of Lieutenant-colonel Thomas Lloyd showing the regiment on parade in the background
- Active: 17 April 1794 – 20 July 1808
- Country: Great Britain (1794–1800); United Kingdom (1801–1808)
- Branch: British Volunteer Corps
- Type: Infantry
- Role: Line infantry
- Size: Two battalions; 1,400 men (1803)
- Nickname: "The Defenders of the Borough of Leeds"
- Mottos: Pro Rege et Lege (For the King and the Law)
- Colors: Scarlet facings (1794); Blue facings (1794–1802); Yellow facings (1803–1808)

The Leeds Volunteer Corps was a line infantry regiment of the British Volunteer Corps. Raised in 1794 under the Volunteer Act 1794 to defend the city of Leeds against insurrection, the regiment saw no service before being disbanded in 1802 with the Peace of Amiens with France. Following the outbreak of the Napoleonic Wars in 1803 the regiment was re-raised at the strength of 1,400 men and continued to exist until being disbanded in 1808 when the threat of French invasion had mostly receded.

== History ==
=== 1794–1802 ===
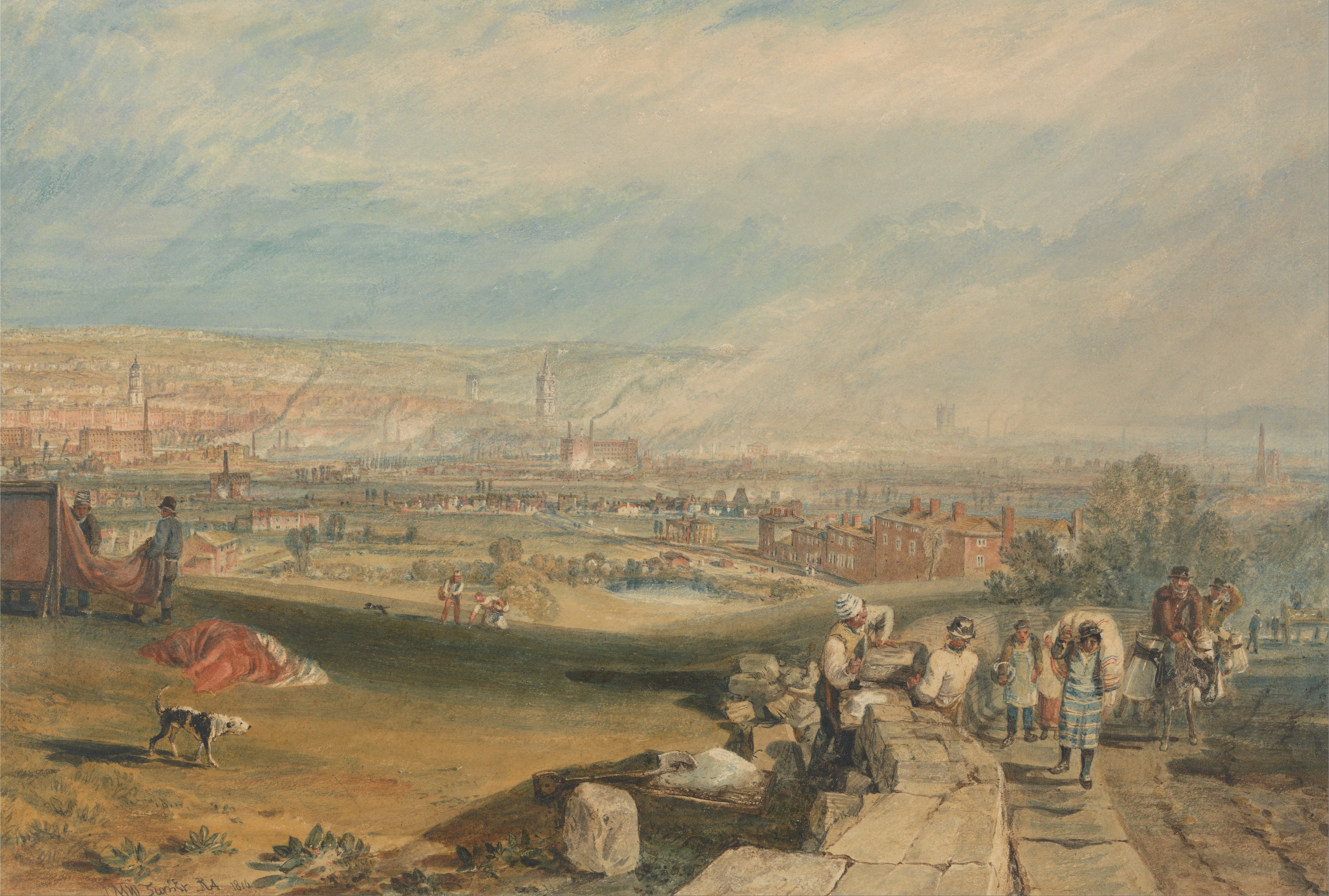
1816 painting of Leeds, where the regiment was raised

Raised in 1794 in response to the Volunteer Act 1794, the Leeds Volunteer Corps served for 'the express purpose of the Internal Defence of this Borough against Insurrection or any sudden commotion'. The creation of a volunteer force for Leeds was first considered at a meeting in Leeds on 17 April and, after agreeing to create the Leeds Volunteer Corps, a subscription was created at this meeting to which around 100 men enrolled to serve. Thomas Lloyd, a cloth merchant from Leeds, was chosen to command the volunteer force. At the meeting, a list of subscribes was drawn up, which totalled almost 200 men. This list also showed the donations made by each man to the Corps, many of which were of £100. By the end of April 1794, there were 200 volunteers.

The Leeds Volunteer Corps would meet every morning and evening to practise military exercise. Their first public appearance was on 4 June 1794 for George III's birthday, where they assembled in White Cloth Hall then marched through the town. The volunteers also organised a church parade in 1794 which was watched by thousands of spectators. Once the Leeds Volunteer Corps reached a subscription base of 300 men in August 1794, the Mayor of Leeds Alexander Turner asked for Thomas Lloyd to be promoted from Commandant to Lieutenant Colonel. This was approved in early September of the same year. On 29 August 1794 the Leeds Volunteer Corps attended a ceremony where they were presented with Colours by the Ladies of Leeds. Over the year, some attempt was made to raise a cavalry to be attached to the Leeds Volunteer Corps. However, this was unsuccessful.

On 26 May 1795, the Leeds Volunteer Corps organised a military festival – 'A Great Military Festival: A Grand Volunteer Review' to celebrate the volunteers and others involved in the war against France. This was potentially the greatest event of civic militarism outside of London during the existence of the British Volunteer Corps. The Volunteer Corps of Leeds, Bradford, Huddersfield, Halifax and Wakefield participated and the event attracted over 60,000 spectators, according to the Leeds Intelligencer.

On 18 September of the same year, Lieutenant Colonel Lloyd hosted a dinner for the Leeds Volunteer Corps at his mansion. In November, the unit presented a letter to George III congratulating him on surviving an assassination attempt. The final activity of 1795 for the Leeds Volunteers Corps was on 30 December where they were inspected by Prince William, Duke of Gloucester on Chapeltown Moor. They were found to be to his satisfaction.

On 13 February 1796, the Leeds Volunteer Corps assisted in the taming of a fire at a linen factory on Water Lane, where 8 people died and 20 were injured. The Leeds Volunteer Corps were once again reviewed on 4 August during the Great Review of Volunteers by Lieutenant General Scott and were once again found to be satisfactory. The final act of the Leeds Volunteer Corps in 1796 was the changing of their service terms, after the Wakefield Volunteer Corps did the same, to:

Great Britain: To any part of Great Britain under Acts of 43, 3, 96 and 121

The Leeds Volunteer Corps were once again called upon on 11 August 1799 to aid against a fire at a wool mill at Bean Ing belonging to Messrs Wormald, Fountain and Gott. Later, in October the same year, the Leeds Volunteer Corps also participated in a general field day.

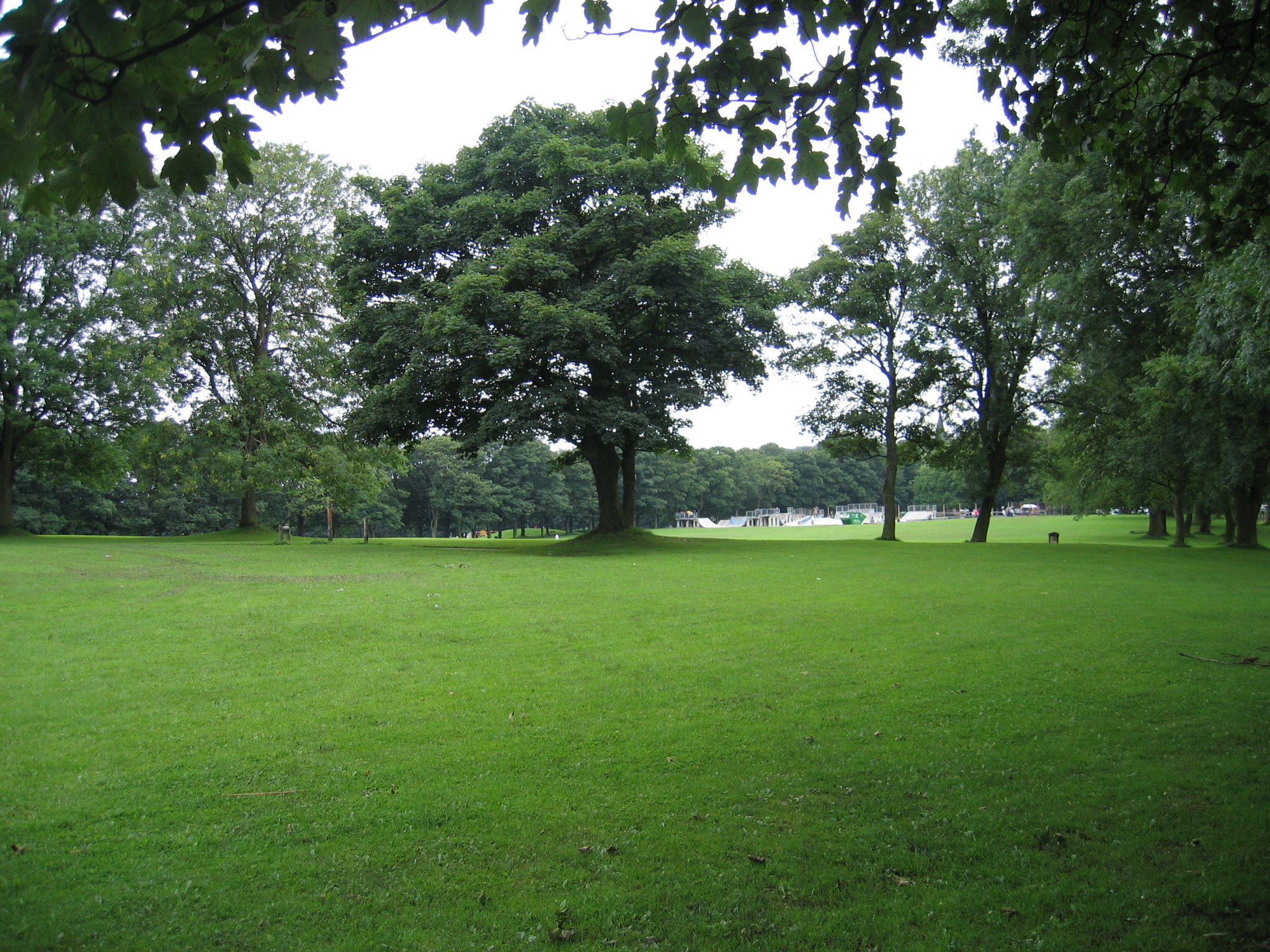
Modern-day view of Woodhouse Moor, where the final inspection of the Leeds Volunteer Corps took place

The final inspection of the Leeds Volunteer Corps took place on Woodhouse Moor by General Stavely. Again, they were found to be satisfactory. The Leeds Volunteer Corps were disbanded in 1802, primarily due to the signing of the Treaty of Amiens on 25 March 1802. Only six men were listed as having 'gone for a soldier' or 'into the army' Before the disbandment though, a grand celebration featuring balls, dinners and concerts took place on 1 June to celebrate the Treaty of Amiens' signing. During the first era of the Leeds Volunteer Corps, the average attendance of members was 5.5%.

=== 1803–1808 ===
In September 1803, with the increasing threat of French invasion during the Napoleonic Wars, the Leeds Volunteer Corps were reassembled. A meeting was held on 5 July 1803, in White Cloth Hall Yard, to discuss the possibility of the reformation of the Leeds Volunteer Corps. This was then proposed to His Majesty, who accepted the proposed unit on 8 September 1803. The reformed Leeds Volunteer Corps were to serve 'Great Britain', as before. At first, enrolment numbers were low, with only about 600 men entering. Yet, returns on 22 October 1803 showed the Leeds Volunteer Corps to be composed of two battalions, which totalled 1400 men. This was thanks to an article in the Leeds Mercury which boosted membership within a week or two, and also helped raise nearly £16,000 in subscriptions. The Ladies of Leeds entered a subscription to pay for each volunteer to have a flannel waistcoat.

The Leeds Volunteers were ordered not to be absent for more than 48 hours during this period due to fears over Napoleon's planned invasion of the United Kingdom. Plans were also made to give the Leeds Volunteer Corps the ability to rush to London in wagons if they were needed to resist a French invasion. From 26 September 1803 the Leeds Volunteers were to complete 20 days of training over 5 weeks. The first major event for the Leeds Volunteer Corps took place on 22 October, which was observed of a Day of Fast. All attended a divine service in the morning, followed by an afternoon inspection by Lieutenant-Colonel Garden. In November the Leeds Volunteer Corps received orders to be ready to march on the shortest notice, indicating a sense of danger within the army command. In this case, the North Battalion was to assemble in Briggate and the South Battalion to assemble on Boar Lane.

At the start of 1804, the Leeds Volunteer Corps received their new uniforms. Another inspection took place soon after this by General Lee, who found the volunteer's firing to be performed in "excellent time". On 8 March the Colours were presented to Colonel Lloyd by the Mayoress during a celebratory service. The next day volunteers were once again inspected in Mixed Cloth Hall as a response to the Governments decision to place a number of volunteers on permanent duty. In April 1804, the Leeds Volunteer Corps were put on 3 weeks of active duty. They marched to York from 6 to 8 April, after having the Articles of War read to them in Cloth Hall Yard. Most of this time was spent marching into the country and practising military exercises. The volunteers returned to much praise and celebration, including a speech given by the recorded praising all the men on their exertions. Subscribers to the Leeds Volunteer Corps were called upon, on 15 May, with a letter stating:

The Subscribes to the Volunteer Corps for the Borough and Parish of Leeds, are requested to pay a further sum of 25 per Cent, upon their respective Subscriptions, into the Bank of Messrs.

As usual, the Leeds Volunteer Corps assembled to celebrate His Majesty's birthday on 4 June. The final activity of the year was when the Leeds Volunteer Corps were summoned to help fight a fire at Benjamin Gatts mill in Armley in November.

A request was made to resupply the Leeds Volunteer Corps with Prussian Muskets on 17 January 1805, stating that every musket they currently had needed replacing. This requested was granted and the Leeds Volunteer Corps were provided with new Prussian Muskets. The Leeds Volunteer Corps once again returned to active duty in October 1805, and again returned to high praise from the townsfolk of Leeds. The volunteers work on duty consisted of prepping for a review and inspection by Brigadier-General Hodgson, from which they passed with flying colours. The Mayor of Doncaster gave a ball and supper to the officers, corporations and neighbouring gentry of the Leeds Volunteer Corps as a show of respect. On 20 November the Armley cloth mill owned by Benjamin Gott was destroyed by fire but, thanks to the efforts of the Leeds Volunteers, this fie did not spread to the corn mill and other adjacent premises.

Napoleon abandoned his planned invasion in August 1805, and the British government began to make changes to the Volunteer Corps. The Levy-En-Masse Act 1803 was an attempt by the British Government to destroy the volunteer force through regulatory changes. In August 1806 there were several meetings held to determine the future of the Leeds Volunteer Corps, of all which decided to continue the service of the volunteers. Yet, during a return in the same year, the Leeds Volunteer Corps were missing 774 men from 1400 previously enrolled.

On 31 January 1807 the Mercury announced that Colonel Lloyd has resigned command of the Leeds Volunteer Corps. He received much praise and expressed regret both from the volunteers and the general townsfolk following his departure. He received a gold snuff box from the non-commissioned officers and privates of the Leeds Volunteer Corps as a token of their thanks. After this the efficiency and spirit of the Leeds Volunteer Corps was lost, starting off their demise. Yet they continued service for another year, with a two-week active duty period commencing on 30 September. During this time some of the men became involved in a disturbance of sorts, resulting in the Adjutant of the South Battalion Captain Jackson having his arm broken. Due to this injury, the officers of the Volunteer Infantry rewarded him with a sword valuing fifty guineas the following year, as well as a subscribed sword from the non-commissioned officers, drummers and privates of the South Battalion on 10 December 1807.

In 1808, Petitions for Peace became general and one was sent from Leeds on 5 March with over 28,000 names. The Levy-En-Masse Act 1803 was succeeded by the Local Militia Act 1808, which also aimed to remove the Volunteer Corps and replacing them with the militia. After the passing of the bill, around 800 volunteers assembled in Cloth Hall to have it read and explained to them. Around 200 men left for the Militia that day, and another 140 left around a week later. Of these men, 177 men and 94 officers and staff belonged to the North Battalion alone. Thus the Leeds Volunteer Corps slowly ceased to exist.

== Organisation ==
The Leeds Volunteer Corps was composed of two battalions, divided into the North Battalion and South Battalion. It is debated as to why this was the case.

One argument is that the divide was due to political alliance. The Leeds Volunteers were apparently split into Lloyd's Tory-Anglican corporation and Whig-Liberal dissenting officers. The party was a distinctive feature of the corps with only the threat of invasion overcoming the party divide.

The other argument was instead that religion caused the split into two battalions. Supposedly, one battalion was supporting the Anglican corporation. The other battalion was the opposition to this, composed of Unitarian supporters.

== Uniform ==
The regimental colour of the Leeds Volunteer Corps present to the regiment by Lloyd in 1795

The uniform of the Leeds Volunteer Corps changed several times over their service periods. Initially, the Leeds Intelligencer reported in early May 1794 that the Leeds Volunteer Corps uniform was to be blue faced with scarlet, with cape and cuffs of the latter colour, a mottoed button, and white waistcoat and breeches. Two weeks later, the Leeds Intelligencer reported that the Leeds Volunteer Corps uniform had changed. The new uniform of the volunteers was to be scarlet faced with blue, and a mottoed button. The facings uniform was reported to be of a bright blue. The coat was described as having buttons in pairs, with 4 pairs on the lapels as well as buttons at the side of each collar and on the cuffs. Later the same year, the Leeds Volunteer Corps were presented with their colours. These colours were the Union Flag and the Leeds Coat of Arms with the motto "Pro Rege et Patria".

The uniform of the Leeds Volunteer Corps was once again altered upon their re-establishment in 1803. The uniform was scarlet faced with yellow. On a Field Officer's uniform there are 5 pairs of buttons running down each breast, but no buttons on the cuffs. These buttons are flat, with the initials "LV" engraved on, as was the case in the previous uniforms. The uniform of other ranks was still scarlet faced with yellow as well as white breeches with black gaiters, caps with a white feather for battalion companies, and a green feather for “flank” companies. A field officer's coat of this design is displayed in Leeds City Museum. The volunteers received these new uniforms early the following year. The Leeds Volunteer Corps were again presented with their colours in March. In October 1805, the uniform's feathers were replaced with tufts for all ranks. Upon the disbandment of Leeds Volunteer Corps in 1808 the remaining uniforms were sold at auction.

== Demographics ==
The men of the Leeds Volunteer Corps could be split demographically by their occupation or residence. All stated percentages are based on less than 200 of the pre-1803 Leeds Volunteers Corps.

By occupation, the following divides are seen: 33.16% gentlemen; 22.45% retailer; 14.8% artisan-high; 11.73% artisan-low; 6.2% employers; 5.61% professionals; 5.1% artisan-low and 1.02% labourers.

By residence in Leeds, the following divides are seen: 44.75% town; 20.44% Kirkgate; 9.94% Mill Hill and West; 6.08% North West; 5.52% South; 5.52% East; 4.42% Outer Towns and 3.31% North East.

It can be observed that the majority of the men in the Leeds Volunteer Corps were wealthy gentlemen, which is not out of character for the time. A minority of men belonged to the labourer or artisan-low category.

It is also known that none of the men were below 5'9" in height, with some of the volunteers being reported to be above 6 foot.

== Awards ==
=== Vote of thanks ===
The Leeds Volunteer Corps received two votes of thanks from the corporation during their service. The first was passed on 29 September for 'their readiness in enrolling themselves for its defence' and resulted in Lieutenant Colonel Lloyd being presented with an £84 sword, which would cost almost £11,000 in 2018 value.

The second vote of thanks was passed on 5 May 1802, after the reestablishment of the Leeds Volunteer Corps. The volunteers were rewarded with a dinner at the corporation's expense.

=== Awards given to Lieutenant Colonel Lloyd ===
On 17 June 1796, the non-commissioned officers and privates presented Lloyd with a 'mark of attachment' as a silver cup valued at 160 guineas.

In late 1801 the officers, men and non-commissioned officers of the Leeds Volunteer Corps commissioned a portrait of Lieutenant Colonel Lloyd as 'a present to the Colonel's Lady’.

After the final disbandment of the Leeds Volunteer Corps, Lieutenant Colonel Lloyd was presented with a gold snuff box 'as a mark of respect and approbation'.

== Notable volunteers ==
=== Thomas Lloyd ===
Thomas Lloyd was the Lieutenant Colonel of the Leeds Volunteer Corps from its outset to conclusion. Lloyd was a cloth merchant in Leeds and the youngest son of George Lloyd of Harrowby Hall, Horsforth. Lloyd was a significant figure in Leeds. He bought Armley Mills in 1788 and turned it into the world's largest woollen mill.

=== Thomas Chorley ===
Thomas Chorley was as a surgeon in the Leeds Volunteer Corps from 1803. He was a practicing surgeon at Leeds General Infirmary.

== Records and artefacts ==
Specific documents, artefacts, and other resources

=== The National Archives, Kew ===
==== Muster books and pay lists ====
Leeds Volunteers (North) battalion, 1803–1808: WO 13/4613

Leeds Volunteers (South) battalion, 1803–1808: WO 13/4613

==== Monthly Returns ====
Leeds Volunteers, 1795–1803: WO 17/1032

=== Sheffield City Archives ===
Monthly returns of Leeds Volunteer Corps of Foot, 1799–1801: WWM/Y/36/4

=== The London Gazette ===
Appointment of officers:

"Leeds Corps of Volunteers". The London Gazette. No. 13681. 5 July 1794. p. 685.

"Leeds Volunteers". The London Gazette. No. 15633. 20 October 1803. p. 1446.

=== The National Army Museum ===
Russell, John (1801), Lieutenant-Colonel Thomas Lloyd, Colonel of the Leeds Volunteers, 1801 (oil on canvas)

=== British Library ===
Lawton, D. (1794), The Leeds Volunteer's March ... Arranged for the Organ or Harpsichord, with a Variation. (sheet music), London: Longman and Broderip, for the Author
