= Cap of maintenance =

Ceremonial cap of crimson velvet lined with ermine

An heraldic cap of maintenance. It is worn with the tail facing backwards and is depicted in heraldry with the tail facing to the sinister (viewer's right).

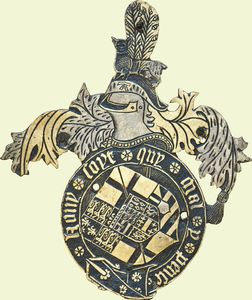
Position of cap of maintenance within a heraldic achievement, namely on top of the helm and below the crest. It thus takes the place of the torse. Garter stall plate of Arthur Plantagenet, 1st Viscount Lisle.

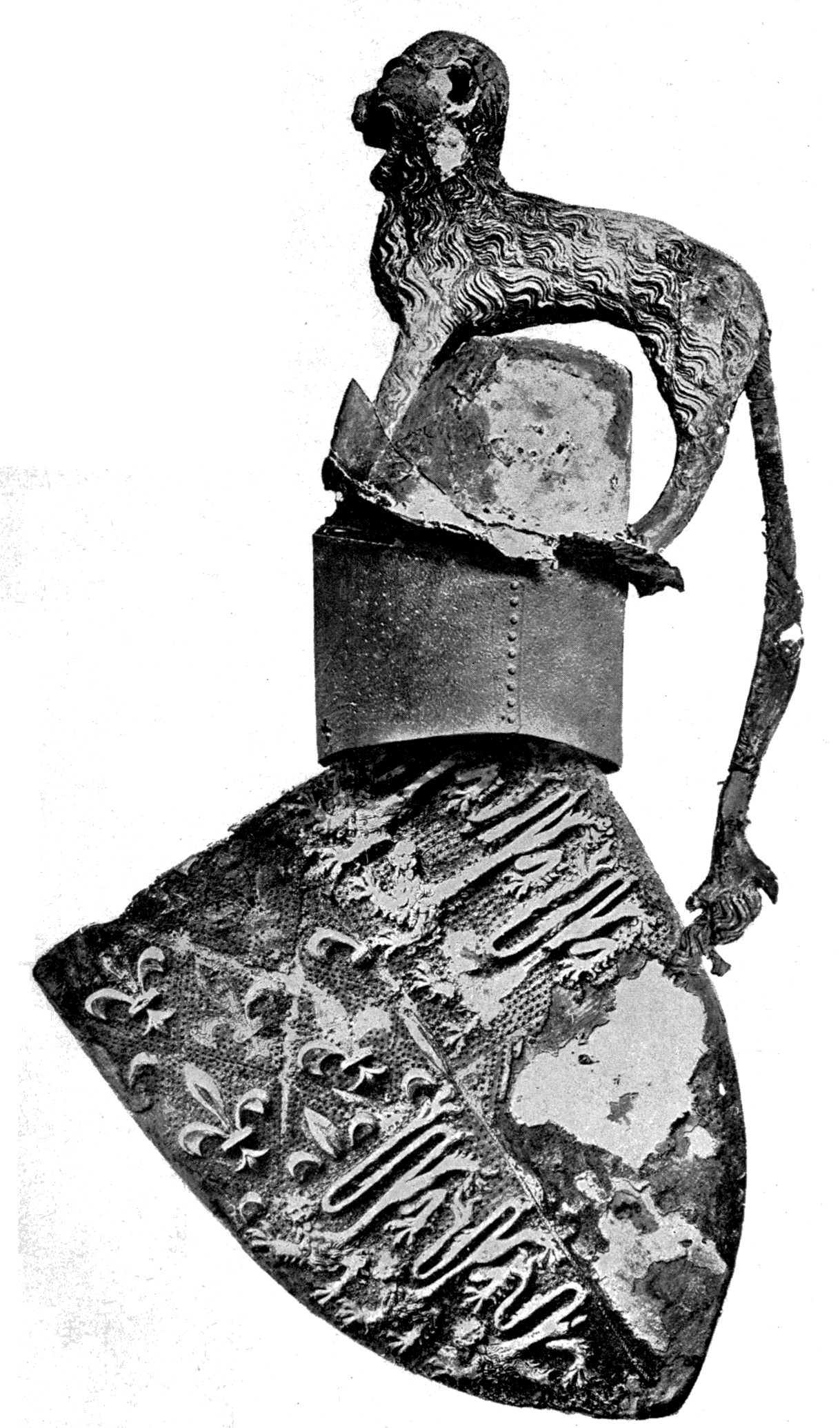
Shield, helm and crest of Edward, the Black Prince, from his tomb in Canterbury Cathedral. Between the lion crest and the helm is a cap of maintenance, now almost entirely decayed.

Typical of British heraldry, a cap of maintenance, known in heraldic language as a chapeau gules turned up ermine, is a ceremonial cap of crimson velvet lined with ermine, which is worn or carried by certain persons as a sign of nobility or special honour. It is worn with the high part to the fore, and the tapering tail behind. It may substitute for the torse (a twisted roll of fabric) in the heraldic achievement of a person of special honour granted the privilege by the monarch. It thus appears in such cases on top of the helm and below the crest. The ceremonial form of a Cap of Maintenance does not, however, feature in the present royal coat of arms of the United Kingdom, which shows the royal crest upon the royal crown, itself upon the royal helmet; the derivative Crown Lining Cap does, however, feature inside the Crown on that present Achievement of the UK.

== Origins ==
The origin of this symbol of dignity is obscure. One might speculate that the origin relates to the French verb maintenir – "to hold" or "to keep". The purpose of the cap was to keep a crown or coronet secure (and comfortable) on the head, thus its function was simply to "maintain" the coronet in place. The granting of the cap as an honour might refer specifically to the red velvet and/or ermine trim, distinct from a simpler design of the cap.

== Royal insignia ==
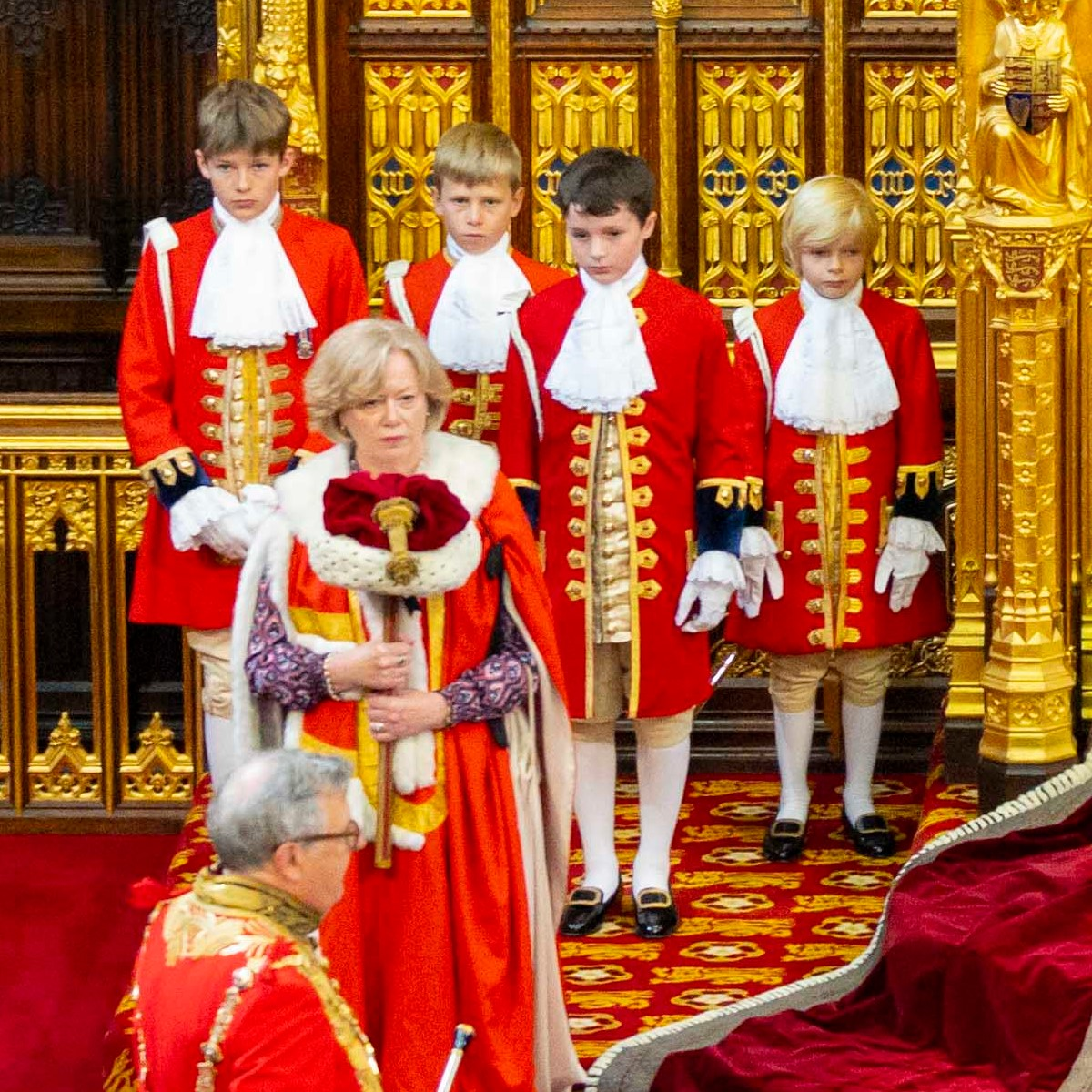
Angela Smith, Baroness Smith of Basildon with the cap in 2024

According to the Oxford English Dictionary, a cap of maintenance was granted by the pope to English Kings Henry VII and his son King Henry VIII as a mark of special privilege. A cap of maintenance is one of the insignia of the British sovereign and is carried directly before the monarch at the State Opening of Parliament. In recent times this duty has routinely been performed by the Leader of the House of Lords. The Crown, the Cap of Maintenance and the Sword of State are carried under escort to the Royal Gallery for the state opening of Parliament by the king.

Kings of the United Kingdom used to wear a cap of maintenance at their coronation, prior to the anointing, as seen most recently at the coronation of King George VI: it was worn for the journey to Westminster Abbey, for the procession inside the Abbey and then when seated in the Chair of Estate during the first part of the coronation service. Queens regnant do not wear them on such occasions, but wear instead a diadem, as in the case of Queen Elizabeth II who wore the George IV State Diadem before her coronation. King Charles III did not wear the cap of maintenance for his coronation in 2023; he travelled bare-headed in his coach to Westminster Abbey, and stayed bare-headed until he was crowned.

== Lining of peer's coronet ==
In more general terms, the velvet and ermine lining of a crown (or of the coronet of a peer) is itself sometimes called a 'cap of maintenance', and is technically a separate item from the crown itself. It may have had a purely practical origin being used to help a crown fit more firmly or to protect the head from bare metal on the crown. As peers' coronets are displayed affronté, or facing forward, the only visible parts are the front of the ermine trim and the velvet top (with a gold tassel) – the ermine tails would be invisible.

== Confusion with "Muscovy hat" ==
Several English cities and towns refer to the use of a "cap of maintenance" as worn by a ceremonial officer, most usually a swordbearer. These are based most often on a design worn by the swordbearer of the Lord Mayor of the City of London. However, this item is called by the City of London authorities a "Muscovy hat" and is a historic reference to the medieval trade with the Baltic. In the 17th and 18th centuries, a Muscovy hat was sometimes depicted above the coat of arms of the City of London, in place of the more conventional helm and crest of a dragon's wing charged with a red cross.

The confusion as to nomenclature stems from references in early borough charters granting the right to the use of a ceremonial sword which is often mentioned in addition to the right to a cap of maintenance. However, this was intended to mean that in civic processions a cap of maintenance should be carried along with the sword (and mace), signifying that the mayor was the sovereign's representative. The correct form of use can be seen at the State Opening of Parliament, where it is carried alongside the Sword of State in front of the monarch. It would be quite improper for a commoner to wear it.

== Variants ==
In many English towns where the privilege of a sword was granted by the Crown (for example York, Bristol, Coventry, Lincoln, Newcastle upon Tyne, Norwich, Worcester, Hereford, Exeter, and Hull) the swordbearer wears a variant of the City of London Muscovy Hat, although some wear other sorts of eccentric headgear which they mistakenly also call a "cap of maintenance". However, the 'grant' is a grant of arms and a heraldic charge rather than an actual object.

== City of York usage ==
Arms of the City of York, with quasi-cap of maintenance reversed from usual heraldic orientation.

The City of York claims to possess an original medieval cap of maintenance, which is kept and displayed in the Mansion House; whatever its origin, it is, in fact, a "Bycocket" or "Robin Hood" style of the cap with ermine trimmings forming into a split peak at the back and was copied from a heraldic drawing and not from a genuine cap of maintenance. Caps of this style are still worn by the York Swordbearers.

The City of York claims the grant of a cap of maintenance from the Yorkist King Richard III (1483–1485) and incorporates this into its coat of arms as a quasi-crest but reverses it so that the tail or peak faces to dexter (viewer's left), thus further compounding the confusion.

== See also ==
- List of hat styles
