= British Volunteer Corps =

British military reserve force (1794–1814)

Volunteer Corps
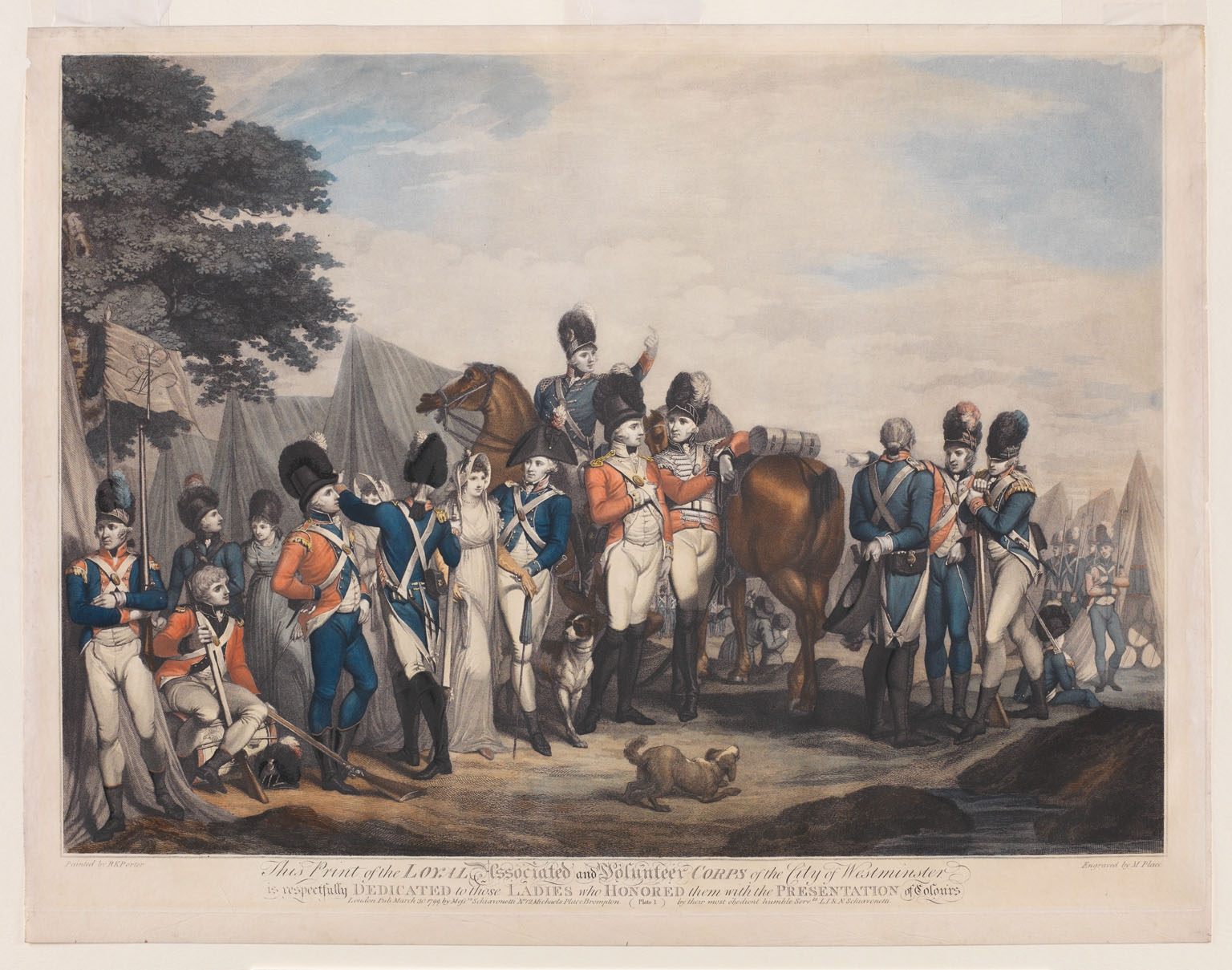
- 1799 engraving of troops of several different London Volunteer Corps units
- Active: 1794–1814
- Country: Great Britain; United Kingdom
- Type: Military reserve force
- Role: Internal security
- Size: 400,000 (1804)
- Engagements: French Revolutionary Wars; Battle of Fishguard; Napoleonic Wars

The Volunteer Corps was a military reserve force raised in Great Britain in 1794 during the War of the First Coalition. It was created to carry out internal security duties and resist potential invasions by the French First Republic and its allies. The Volunteer Corps' remaining infantry and artillery units were disbanded in 1814, leading to the end of the force's existence, though its cavalry units continued to exist as the Yeomanry Cavalry.

== History ==
At the start of the War of the First Coalition, the Secretary of State for War, Henry Dundas, began to receive "a great number of Letters", from people living in coastal areas, requesting arms and equipment so that they could defend their localities against any French incursions. The government firmly rejected proposals from Kent and Chichester to form "military associations" but similar bodies were formed in Brighton, Rye, Lindfield and Penzance without any official sanction. The government had already experienced in Ireland the problems of independent volunteer companies, formed during the American War of Independence. The "drilling and training, purchasing of uniforms and arms, drawing up articles of association, electing their officers, [and] instructing delegates" for conventions, had "contributed to greater political awareness" in their ranks — not least of "parallels between the issues animating the American struggle and their own grievances". In advance of a rebellion by led their more disaffected elements, the government moved to disarm and disband the Irish Volunteers in 1793.

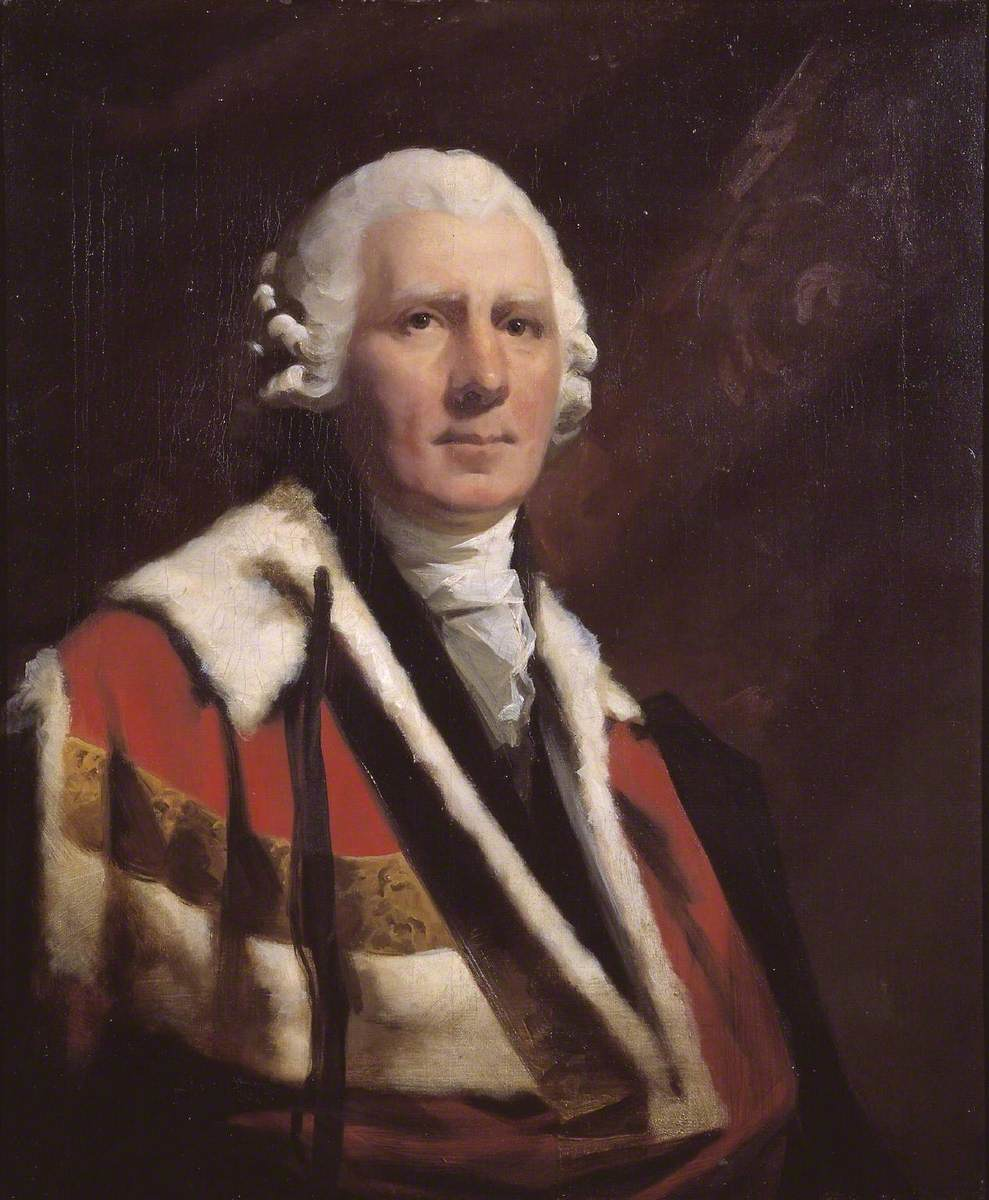
Henry Dundas, who played the foremost role in the Volunteer Corps' creation

Dundas had received more practical proposals for volunteer forces from the Marquess of Buckingham, Arthur Young and General Sir William Erskine. All this led Dundas together with Lord Amherst, to formulate plans for volunteer forces, which were sent to the king for approval in February 1794. On 14 March, the "Plan of Augmentation for the Forces for Internal Defence" were circulated to the lords lieutenant, who would have a central role in creating the new forces. William Pitt the Younger's government ensured the passage of the Volunteer Act 1794 through Parliament in the same month. The lords lieutenant were tasked with organising committees and obtaining subscriptions from wealthy donors, to raise and support the Volunteers. Local companies or "corps" of Volunteers fulfilled three roles; to man coastal artillery batteries, to augment the regular Militia in the infantry role, and to form cavalry troops, which were called Yeomanry.

The government became concerned that there were too few Volunteer or Yeomanry Cavalry and passed the Provisional Cavalry Act 1796. This act established the Provisional Cavalry, a force liable for service anywhere in the country. The members of these units were recruited by requiring one man to be provided for service by each man who owned ten or more horses (those who owned fewer horses were collected into groups which were each required to provide one man). Later in 1797 an amendment was passed by parliament which removed the requirement to raise a Provisional Cavalry unit in counties where the Yeomanry already amounted to 75% of the strength required by the Provisional Cavalry Act. This proved to be the case in the majority of counties owing to the strength of the Yeomanry which was a more popular option for the country gentry.

Initially recruitment was slow but the invasion of Flanders and the 1794 Treason Trials caused an increase in volunteers. Further recruits were brought in by Pitt's appeal for volunteers in 1798, which came as Britain was facing the loss of Europe, failed peace negotiations, manpower shortages in the army, financial problems and potential rebellion in Ireland. At its height more than 300,000 men were members of the Corps and other volunteer units, a number matched by the regular army and militia only at the very end of the Napoleonic Wars. The success of the volunteer corps partly enabled Britain to avoid the costly and unpopular measure of mass conscription.

== Composition ==
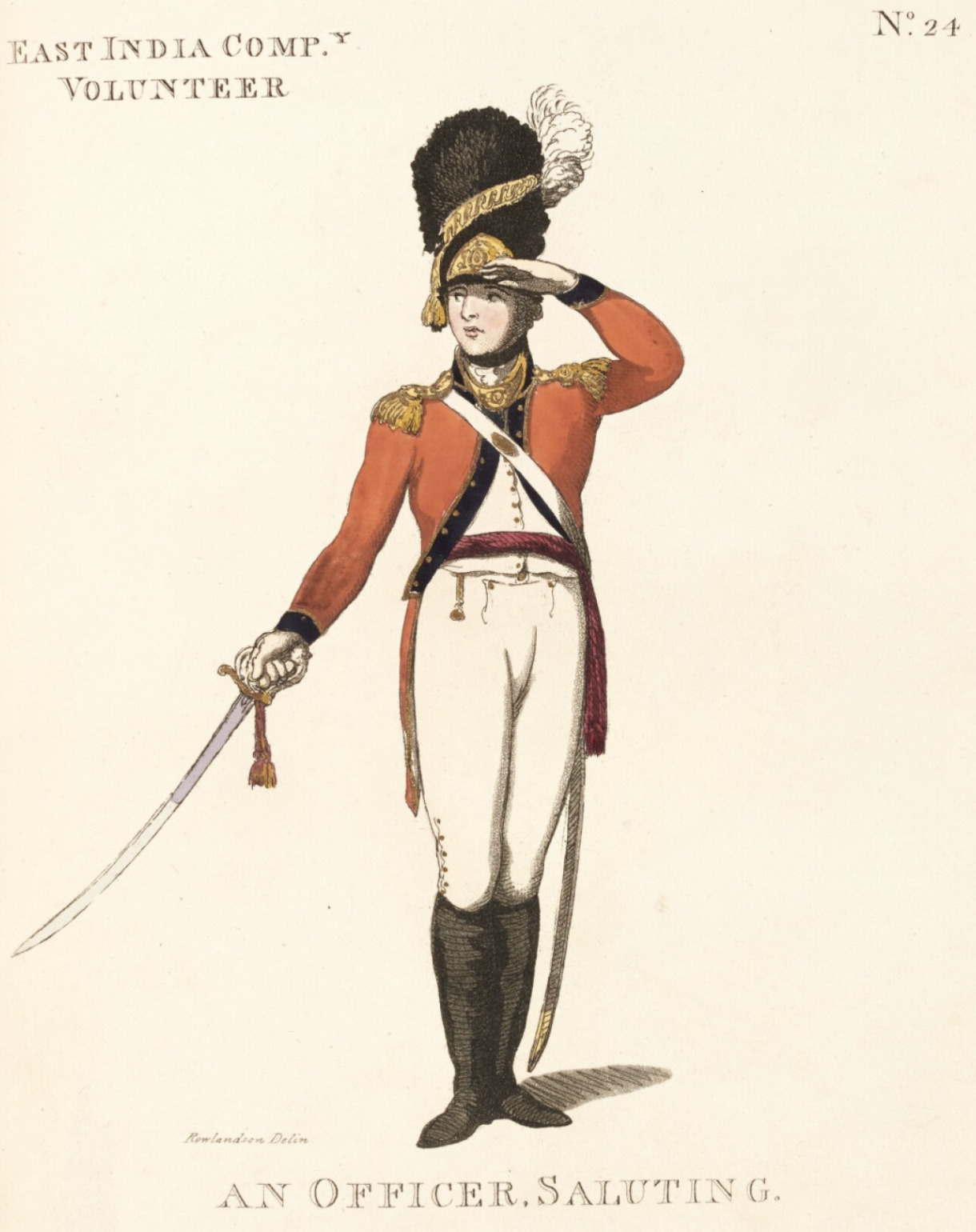
c. 1798 engraving of a Royal East India Volunteers officer saluting

The Volunteer Corps typically drew its members from the propertied classes. Officers were usually members of the gentry (though some junior officers were members of the professional or middle classes) and the enlisted ranks tended to be from the lower middle classes (for example shopkeepers and publicans). The failed Expédition d'Irlande of 1796 and invasion at Fishguard caused the expansion of the corps, including the formation of workplace units such as the 863-strong Cyfarthfa Ironworks unit in South Wales, in which the enlisted ranks were filled by the workmen and the officers were drawn from the clerks and foremen. Such units, made up of working-class men, became more common in the late 1790s and early 1800s due to the increased fear of invasion. Indeed, there was at least one case of de facto conscription, in which a factory-owner decreed that all his workers must join the corps or else be sacked.

The Volunteer corps were occasionally used to keep the peace in Britain but proved unreliable. One unit in Wolverhampton refused to act against food rioters and several volunteers in Devon actually led riots directed at farmers and millers in the winter of 1800–01.

== Training and role ==
London Volunteer Corps units being reviewed by George III in Hyde Park on 4 June 1799

The Volunteer corps companies would meet twice weekly for drill and training; officers were entitled to the half-pay of a regular subaltern, while non-commissioned officers and privates were paid one shilling per day, with three hours of duty or more qualifying as a whole day. The training recommended for the Volunteer corps suggests that they were intended to fight alongside the regular army and militia, but little attention seems to have been given to dealing with civil disorder. An official training booklet entitled "A Manual for Volunteer Corps of Infantry" but known as "The Green Book" was published by the army headquarters at Horse Guards in 1803. This laid out the simple instructions for loading and firing muskets in ranks, but advised that it would be better fighting as skirmishers, finding cover in hedgerows and woods in the manner of light infantry. Regular officers generally had a low opinion of the Volunteers' capabilities; Lieutenant-General Sir John Moore is alleged to have said that he would position them on high ground so that they could watch the regulars do the fighting.

In an emergency, the Volunteers were to be roused by the beating of drums. They were initially not required to serve outside of their own parish unless they consented; however, the Levy en Masse Act 1803 required Volunteers to serve wherever ordered within Great Britain. Subsequently Volunteer corps were invited to undertake a week's "permanent duty", usually by the coast; there were protests by Volunteers at leaving their businesses for so long and pay of ten shillings was insufficient to prevent numerous desertions.

Volunteers, especially in London, sometimes undertook ceremonial duties. At the state funeral of Horatio Nelson in 1806, Volunteers lined the processional route between Westminster and St Paul's Cathedral. King George III held large ceremonial reviews of Volunteers at Hyde Park in 1799, 1800 and 1803.

== Uniforms ==
There were initially no regulations for the uniforms worn by Volunteers, which they generally had to purchase themselves, while arms and equipment were provided free of charge. The choice of uniform design was left entirely to each individual Volunteer corps; some units imitated the flamboyant dress of the most fashionable regular regiments; an expensive uniform could serve as a barrier to prevent undesirable lower-class men from joining, but an over-elaborate one could attract ridicule. Other units opted for the simplest and most practical uniforms possible, while some had no uniform at all, perhaps hoping not to be deployed with the regular army. From 1803, a uniform allowance of one guinea (twenty-one shillings) was paid every three years for each private, but this was insufficient to cover the cost. Volunteers were required by regulations not to wear their uniforms when not on duty, but there are numerous accounts of Volunteer officers sporting their uniforms at the theatre, country fairs, or other social occasions. After August 1803, the coat colour for Volunteers was restricted to the corresponding branch of the regular army; red for infantry, green for rifles and blue for artillery.

1798 engraving of a Hackney Volunteer Infantry private

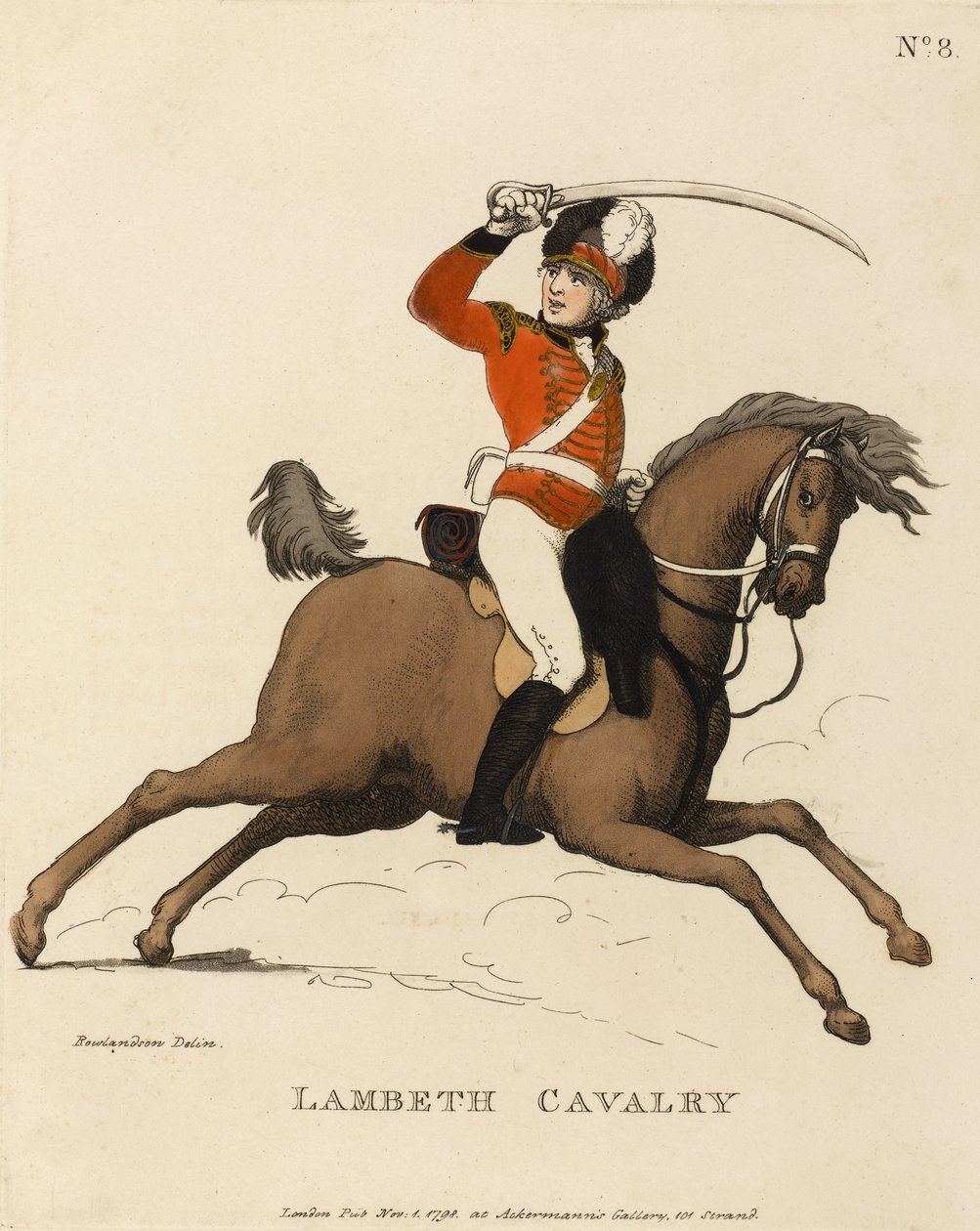
1798 engraving of a Lambeth Volunteer Cavalry trooper

1798 engraving of a Temple Association Volunteers private

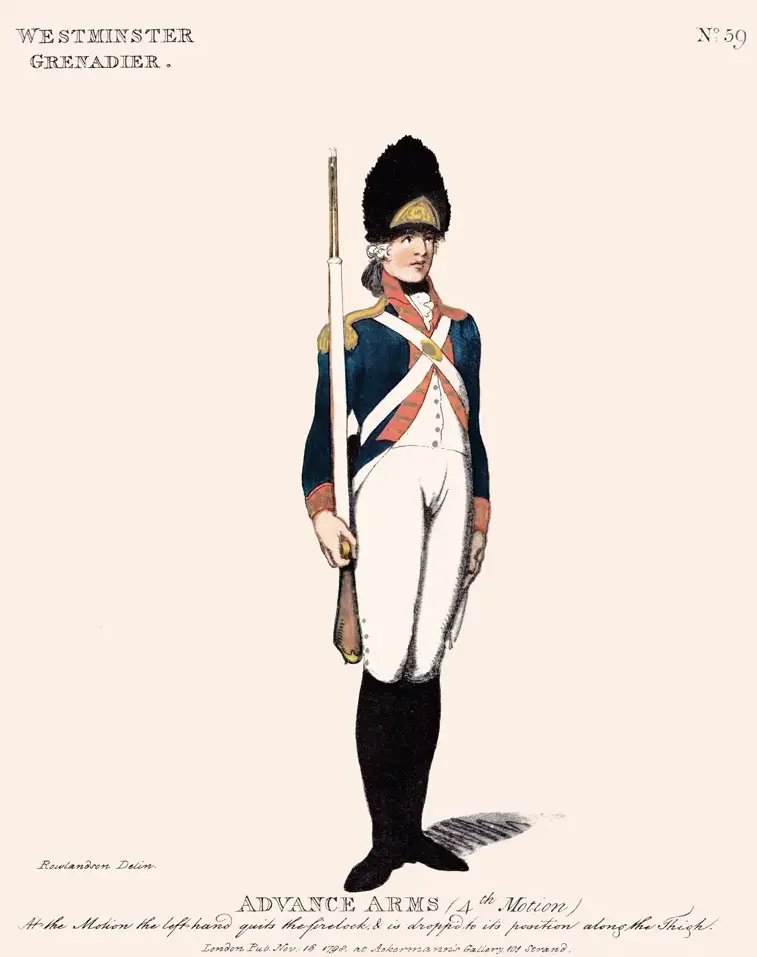
1798 engraving of a Royal Westminster Volunteers grenadier

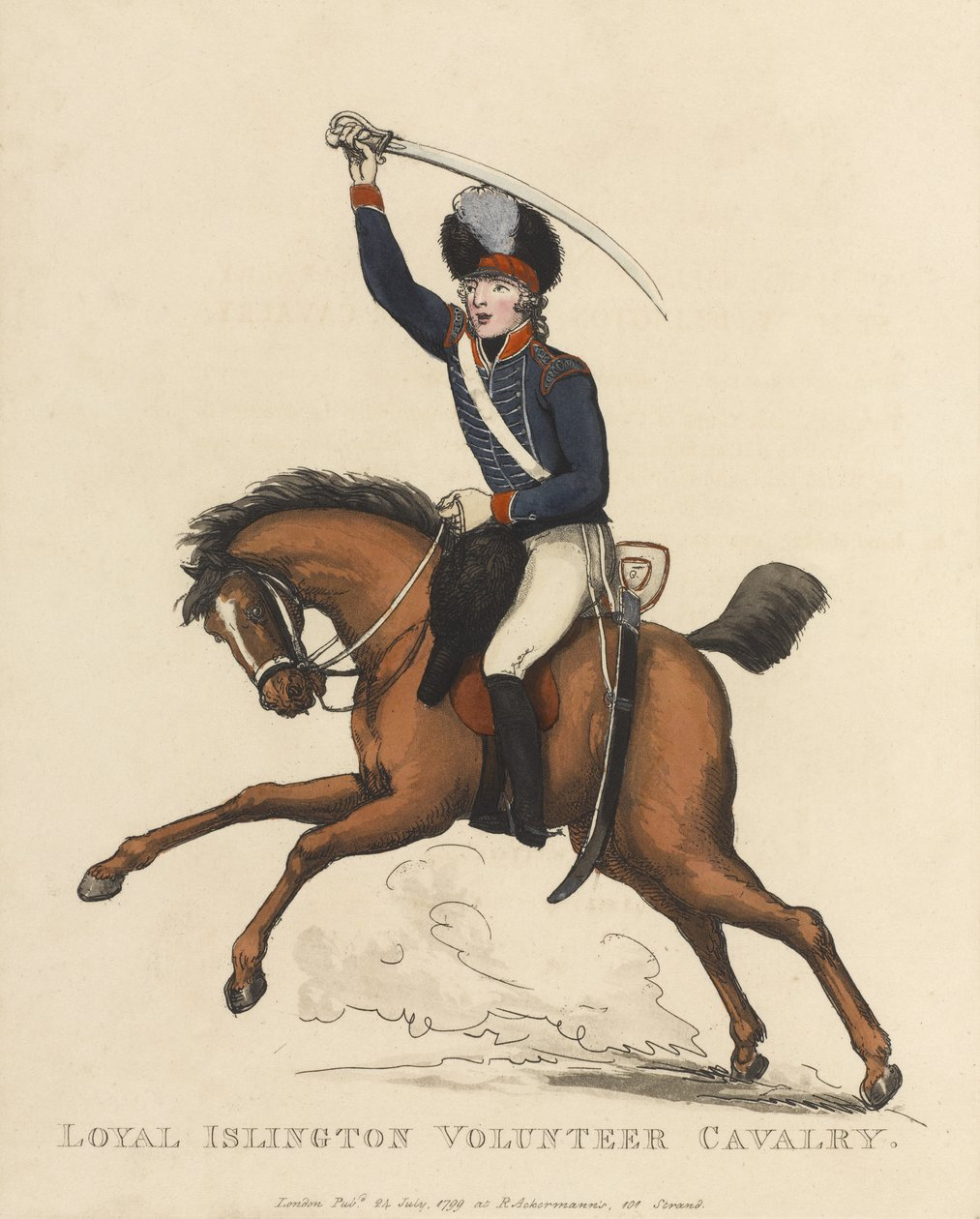
1798 engraving of a Loyal Islington Volunteer Cavalry trooper

1801 painting of the Leeds Volunteer Corps' lieutenant colonel

c. 1805 portrait of a grenadier in a Volunteer Corps regiment

== Termination ==
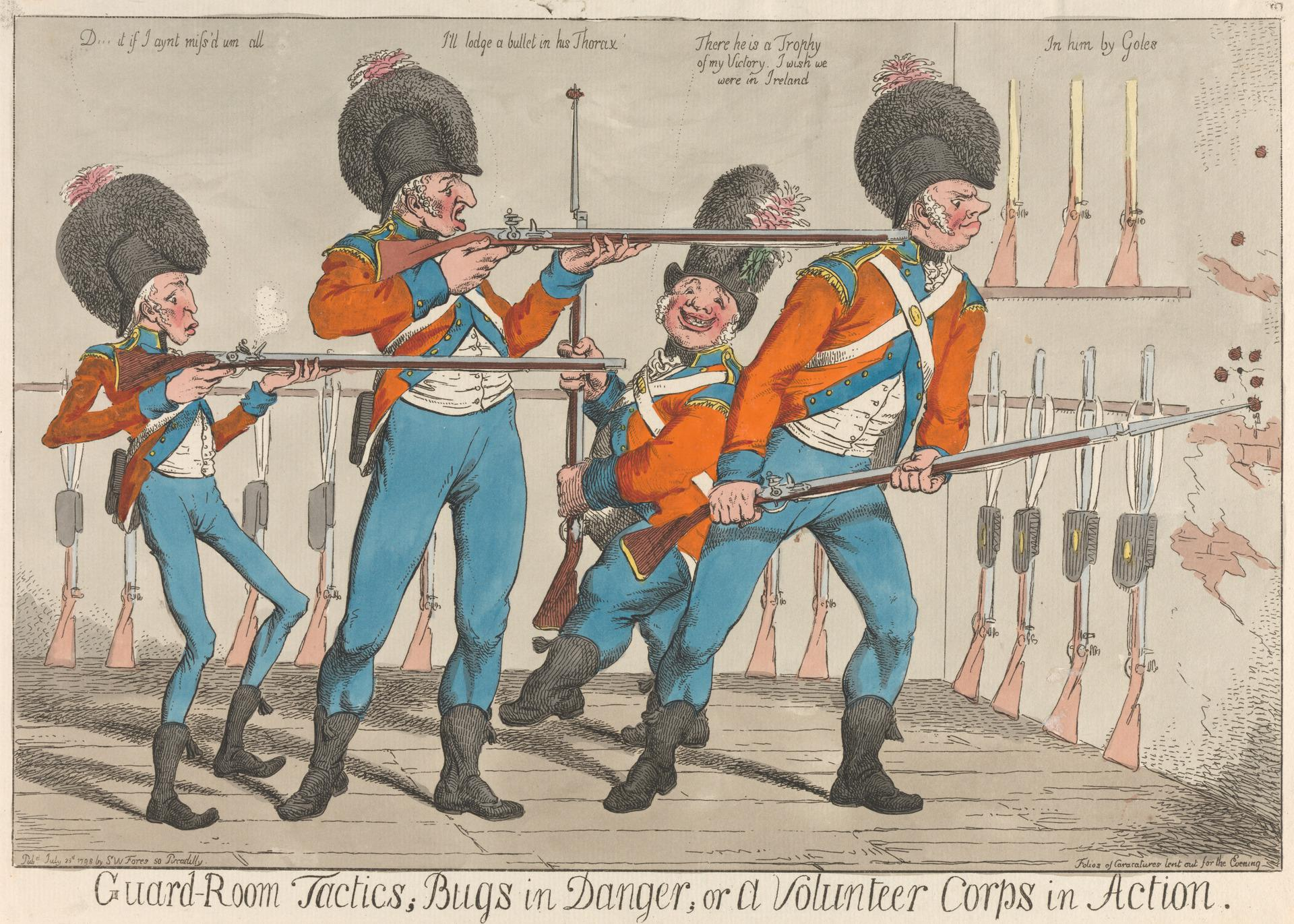
1798 caricature of the Volunteer Corps

The Volunteer Corps's infantry units (but not its Yeomanry or artillery units) were disbanded after the Treaty of Amiens was signed in 1802, but were reestablished in the following year after the Napoleonic Wars began and the British government became aware of Napoleon's planned invasion of the United Kingdom. By the end of 1803, more than 340,000 men had joined the Volunteer Corps, far more than the Addington ministry had planned for, and there were initially insufficient weapons and equipment for them. William Pitt, then in the loyal opposition, became colonel of the Walmer Volunteer Corps despite his frail health. The Volunteer Act and Provisional Cavalry Act were allowed to lapse by the Ministry of All the Talents in 1806.

The role of the Volunteers was partly supplanted in 1809 by the formation of a more reliable Local Militia, recruited by conscription; some 212,000 Volunteers having left the force in that year as the threat of invasion receded. In 1813, a letter was sent to lords lieutenant from the Home Secretary, Lord Liverpool, ordering the disbandment "of the greater part of the volunteer infantry". The infantry and artillery units of the Volunteer Corps were fully disbanded by 1814, though the Yeomanry units were retained in case of civil insurrection.

On 27 June 1814, the Secretary at War, Lord Palmerston, speaking in the House of Commons, "pronounced a very animated eulogium on this meritorious body of men, who had boldly come forward to defend their country when it was threatened with invasion". On 5 July, proposing a vote of thanks to the Army and Navy in the House of Lords, the Secretary of State for War and the Colonies, Lord Bathurst, praised "the signal services rendered by the various corps of volunteers, all of whom emulated each other in their laudable and patriotic self-devotion."

== Notable Volunteers ==
- Robert Burns, private, Royal Dumfries Volunteers
- David Erskine, lieutenant colonel, Bloomsbury and Inns of Court Volunteers
- William Grant, captain, Bloomsbury and Inns of Court Volunteers
- Edward Austen Knight (brother of Jane Austen), captain, East Kent Volunteers
- William Pitt the Younger, colonel of the Royal Trinity House Volunteer Artillery and the Cinque Ports Volunteer Corps
- Walter Scott, Quartermaster and Secretary of the Royal Edinburgh Volunteer Light Dragoons
- Richard Brinsley Sheridan, lieutenant colonel, St James's Volunteer Corps
- Duke of Clarence and St Andrews, later King William IV, private, Teddington Volunteer Corps

== Notable units ==
- Leeds Volunteer Corps
- Royal Westminster Volunteers
