= Flag of the Isle of Wight =

County flag

Isle of Wight
- County flag
- Proportion: 3:5
- Adopted: January 2009; 17 years ago
- Designed by: John Graney
- County council flag
- Proportion: 2:3
- Design: Castle and three gold anchors on blue background

The flag of the Isle of Wight was adopted and registered in January 2009. It shows a diamond shape (the island) hovering over ocean waves. The indentation of the top corner of the diamond represents the River Medina, which is the largest river on the island.

== History ==
The so-called "Rebel Green Flag"

There is anecdotal evidence that the Isle of Wight county colours have been used as a flag. These consisting of two thinner green vertical stripes surrounding a central thick white stripe and these flags are still available from various sources. Other than this the only established flag of modern times prior to 2007 was the three anchor and castle design used by the council. Those who still fly the green and white colours now often refer to them as 'The rebel green'.

In 2007 an 'Isle of Wight Flag Committee' was founded to create a flag for the Isle of Wight. It ran a public competition, in association with the County Press newspaper, to design the flag, which received over 350 entries. Four designs were shortlisted and put to the public in a vote.

2008 competition finalists

Design 1

Design 2

Design 3

Design 4 (winner)

The winning design was by John Graney and was registered by the Flag Institute on 9 January 2009. Although the island does not meet the Flag Institute's preferred criterion of being a historic county, the flag has nevertheless been described as a "county flag" to reflect the island's distinct identity.

In April 2009 the new flag was officially launched and replaced the older design flown from County Hall.

== Isle of Wight Council flag ==
Before this competition, the Council flag was the only popularly known flag for the island. It is taken from the Isle of Wight Arms granted in 1938 and features a representation of Carisbrooke Castle, which was the historic seat of the Governors. The blue surrounding field and three gold anchors represent the island's status and maritime history.

The Council flag can only be used by the Council on its local government buildings. Therefore, until the new island flag was registered, the island's team at events such as the International Island Games used only the Union Flag, or on occasion, St George's Cross.
