= Coat of arms of Wrocław =

Versions
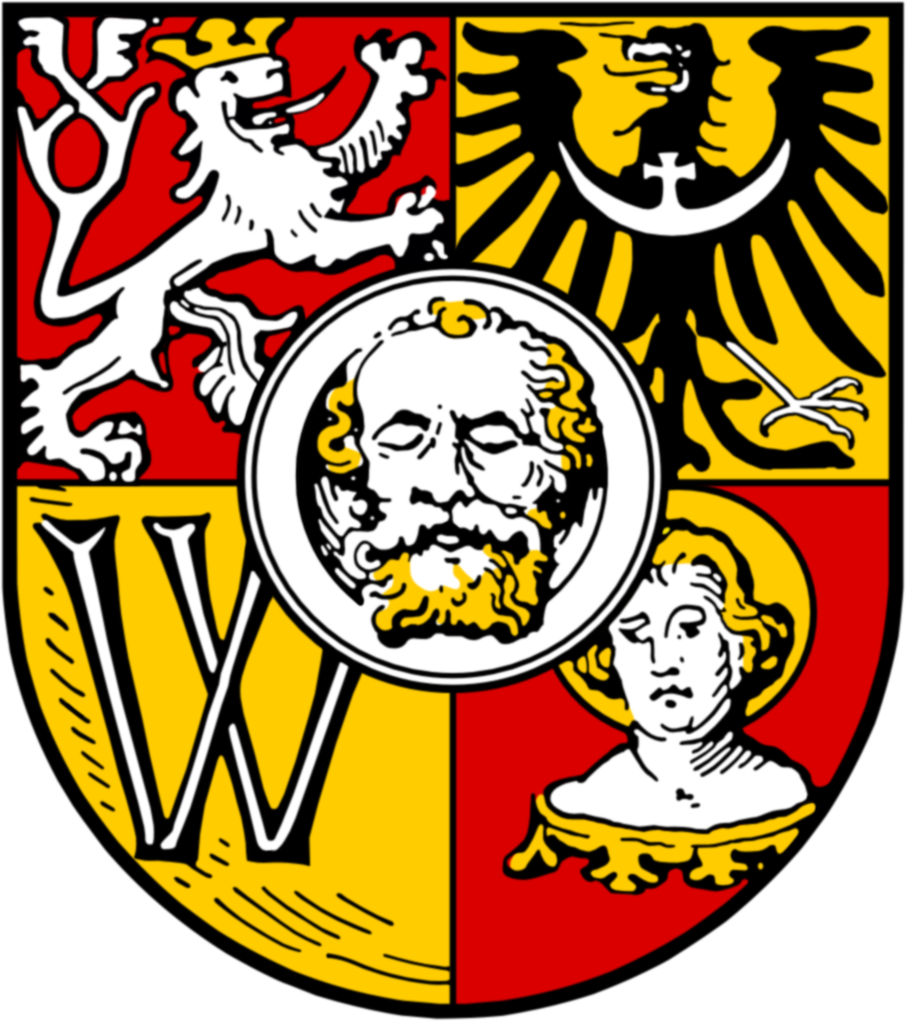
- 1530-1938 (traditional)
- Armiger: Gmina Wrocław
- Adopted: 1530

The coat of arms of Wrocław is divided into quarters. It dates back to 1530. The arms were approved by Emperor Charles V.

== Description ==
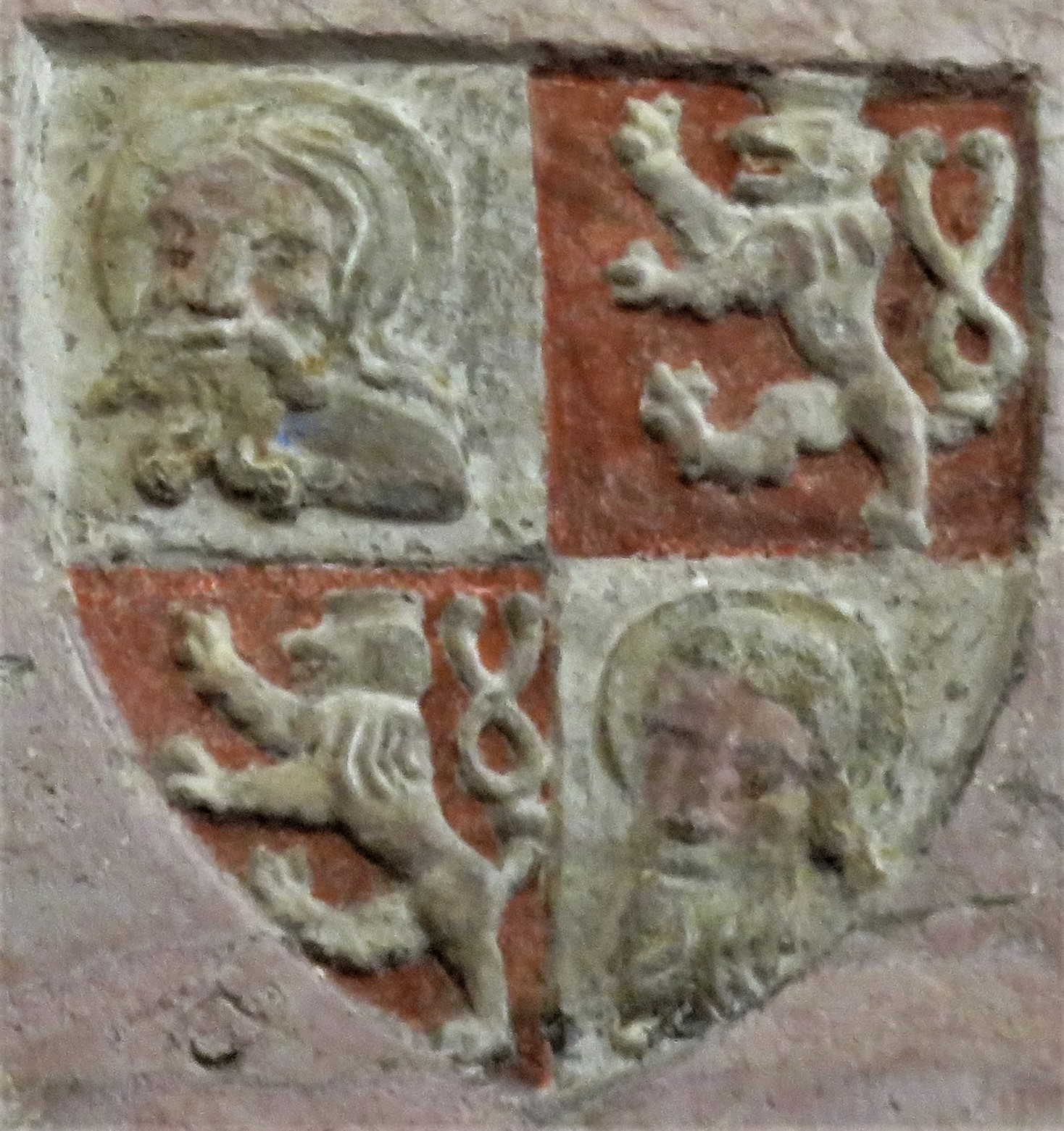
Medieval arms from castle Lauf, around 1360 - the only surviving example of this design.

In the centre is the severed head of John the Baptist, the city's patron saint. The crowned lion rampant in the first (upper left) quarter represents the Kingdom of Bohemia, which Wrocław became part of upon the death of Duke Henry VI of Silesia in 1335. In the second (upper right) quarter there is the Silesian eagle which comes from the ruling Piast dynasty. The letter "W" in the third quarter stands for both Wratislavia, the Latin name of the city, and for the name of the legendary founder of the city Wrócisław (probably Duke Vratislaus I of Bohemia). In the fourth quarter there is John the Evangelist with halo and an overturned crown as pectorale.

Its blazon is: "Quarterly, I: Gules, a lion rampant queue fourch erect facing sinister Argent, armed and langued Or outlined Sable, crowned Or outlined Sable; II: Or, an eagle Sable charged with across its breast and wings a crescent Argent upward pointing with a crosslet Argent attached rising from the middle; III: Or, a capital letter 'W' Sable serifed; IV: Gules, the head and shoulders of St. John the Evangelist gardant Argent, with youthful face and long hair Argent outlined Sable and with halo Or outlined Sable, issuant from an inverted crown Or outlined Sable. Surmounting all at center a roundel Argent, double-bordered in Sable, charged with St. John the Baptist's head Argent, with beard and hair Sable, semi-gardant turned toward the dexter."

== Evolution ==
Medieval version

Arms from 1938 to 1945.

The first version of the coat of arms was created in 1292, and featured only the head of John the Baptist. After Wrocław became part of the Kingdom of Bohemia in 1335, the Bohemian lion was added to the shield in alternating quadrants. The only surviving example of this version of the shield now exists on the wall of Lauf Castle near Nuremberg.

Under Nazi Germany, in 1938, the historic coat of arms was abolished, as the Nazi authorities viewed it as too Slavic. It was replaced by a "purely German" coat-of-arms, a shield parted horizontally, with a black Silesian eagle on the top without Christian crosslet on the breast, and an Iron Cross in red field on the bottom. This was abolished after Wrocław became again part of Poland in 1945.

Arms from 1948 to 1990.

Wrocław, as part of the People's Republic of Poland, changed the coat of arms again as the authorities now considered the original version as too Germanic. It was replaced by a "purely Polish" coat of arms with a Silesian black eagle on gold and a Polish white eagle on a red field. These coat of arms were used from 1948 to 1990.

After the collapse of communism, the city decided to revert to the coat of arms of 1530, albeit in a more stylized form.

== See also ==
- Coat of arms of Silesia
- Polish heraldry
- List of coats of arms

== External links and sources ==
- "Arms of Wroclaw". Archived from the original on 2014-11-07.
- Herby Wrocławia - Coat of arms of Wrocław na portalu polska-org.pl
