= Coat of arms of the Isle of Wight =

- Armiger: Isle of Wight Council
- Adopted: 1938
- Motto: "All this beauty is of God"

The coat of arms of the Isle of Wight was granted to the former Isle of Wight County Council in 1938. The arms were transferred to the new unitary Isle of Wight Council when the county council along with Medina and South Wight district councils were abolished in 1995.

The shield contains an image of Carisbrooke Castle, the historical seat of many former governors of the island, and three gold anchors. The azure (blue) field and anchors are representative of Wight's island status and maritime history. The shield is also the basis of the flag of the Isle of Wight.

The crest gold mural crown, typical of many English county arms. In the case of the Isle of Wight, three blue anchors have been added.

The supporters, both rampant, are a horse and heraldic seahorse, respectively for the agricultural and seafaring traditions known on the Isle. The white colour of these animals mirrors the use of a white horse on arms of Kent. This recalls the links with the ancient Kingdom, as both areas were settled predominantly by tribes of Jutes from the 5th century onwards.

The compartment features the sea and shoreline to further represent the island status. The motto reads "All this beauty is of God".

The arms were granted to the County Council. Under the terms of the grant by the College of Arms, they can not be used by other organisations associated with the Isle of Wight, even with the council's permission.

== Sources ==
- Heraldry of the World: Isle of Wight

== See also ==
- Flag of the Isle of Wight
- Heraldry
