= Coat of arms of Windsor, Ontario =

Coat of Arms of Windsor
- Armiger: Windsor, Ontario
- Adopted: 1992
- Crest: Issuant from a coronet rim Or set with maple leaves Gules and trillium flowers proper a demi stag Or bearing over its dexter foreleg a belt of wampum, its sinister foreleg resting on an automobile wheel all proper.
- Torse: Or and Azure
- Shield: Or on a pale between two roses Gules barbed Vert charged with a cogwheel Or a fleur de lys Or above a rose Or barbed Vert charged with a cogwheel Gules a chief undy Azure.
- Supporters: Two lions Or both gorged with a Loyalist military coronet Azure pendant therefrom a hurt the dexter charged with a steam locomotive wheel the sinister with a steamboat helmswheel Or each supporting a cornucopia mouth downward showing tomatoes and corn all proper.
- Compartment: On a grassy mound set with two sprigs Vert each bearing a rose a trillium flower and a fringed gentian flower proper and rising above barry wavy Argent and Azure.
- Motto: THE RIVER AND THE LAND SUSTAIN US

The coat of arms of Windsor symbolizes the city's past, present, and its culture. The two lions represent royalty and allegiance to The Crown; the deer represents the richness in wildlife in the area. The automobile wheel represents the city's automobile industry. Roses represent the city's warm climate and numerous parks, as well as its nickname "City of Roses". The shield shows the fleur-de-lis, for its French Canadian population, with the Detroit River along the bottom. The ribbon along the bottom is the city's motto: "The River and the Land Sustain Us".
