= Coat of arms of St. Thomas, Ontario =

The coat of arms of St. Thomas, Ontario, Canada, like all others, has special meaning.

At the top of the coat of arms is Colonel Talbot's hound standing on a crown.

The shield depicts a carpenter's square in the upper right corner, which is the symbol of Saint Thomas the apostle, patron saint of builders. A seven-spoked wheel in the lower left corner symbolizes the seven townships of Elgin County with the city of St. Thomas at the centre. It is also a wheel of progress, symbolic of St. Thomas as a historically significant rail centre and developing industrial centre with emphasis on the automotive and transportation industries.

On a diagonal through the centre of the shield, there are two parallel white lines representing transportation tracks. The lines enclose three maple leaves which symbolize loyalty to the Queen, Canada, and respect for the authority of government at three levels: municipal, provincial and federal.

The background colour of the shield, light green, signifies the growth and vitality of the city.
