= Coat of arms of St. John's, Newfoundland and Labrador =

Heraldic emblem of the city

Coat of arms of St. John's
- Armiger: St. John's, Newfoundland and Labrador
- Adopted: 1965
- Crest: Issuant from a Mural Crown or a Rocky Mountain Sable thereon a Lion passant or between two Roses Gules each charged with another Argent barbed seeded slipped and leaved proper, Mantled Gules, doubled Argent
- Shield: Gules a Paschal Lamb proper between two chief Escallops Argent a Chief of the last charged with an ancient Ship sail set pennon and flag flying upon Water Barry wavy proper
- Supporters: John Cabot (left) and Sir Humphrey Gilbert (right)
- Motto: Avancez

The coat of arms of St. John's, Newfoundland and Labrador was granted on 1 March 1965.

Saint John the Baptist is symbolized on the shield by the lamb of God, carrying a banner bearing St George's Cross and scalloped shells. The ship Matthew, sailing on waves at the top of the shield, refers to the city's early discoverers and explorers. The shield is supported on the left by a mariner of the fifteenth century bearing the year 1497, the year the city was discovered by John Cabot. The supporter on the right is a mariner of the late sixteenth century, bearing the date 1583, the year Sir Humphrey Gilbert claimed the region as England's first colony. The stone wall of the crest stands for civic authority, while the lion and roses refer to the city's British heritage. Avancez (French for "advance"), the city's motto, is across the base.
