= Coat of arms of Bucharest =

Heraldic coat of arms symbolizing Bucharest, Romania

- Armiger: Government of the city of Bucharest
- Adopted: 1994
- Motto: Romanian: Patria și Dreptul Meu ("The Homeland And My Right")

The coat of arms of Bucharest is the heraldic symbol of the capital city of Romania. The present-day coat of arms was adopted by Domnitor (Ruling Prince) Alexandru Ioan Cuza, and changed under the Communist regime. In 1994, it was renewed again with minor alterations.

The saint, who is the city's patron, is commonly referred to as simply Saint Dimitrie (Demetrius), thus bearing the same name as the 4th century Saint Demetrius of Thessaloniki—today's arms seem to represent the latter, as the person depicted is dressed in a Roman uniform.

== Description ==
The official description is as follows:

A red shield depicting Saint Dumitru, haloed and standing on foot, wearing clothes distinctive of Roman legionaries and bearing attributes of a warrior saint: spear and cross.

The shield is placed on the chest of a golden eagle bearing a cross in the beak and with an open crown on the head.

The eagle’s beak and claws are colored in red, bearing in the claws in dexter a silver sword with golden hilt, and in the sinister a scepter of the same tincture.

In the lower part of the shield is a tricolor sash on which this motto is written: PATRIA ȘI DREPTUL MEU ("My Country and My Right").

The whole is placed on a blue shield; above it rests a silver mural crown consisting of 7 crenellated towers.

Above the crown is a cross-bearing eagle, the wings open.

== History ==
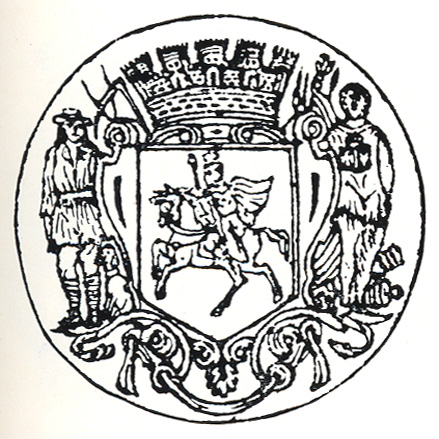
Coat of arms of Bucharest (1864)

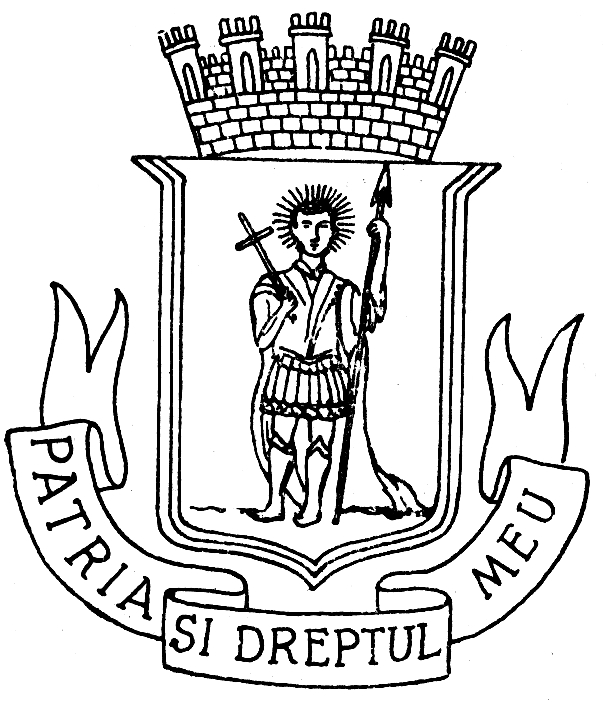
Coat of arms of Bucharest (1868)

An early heraldic symbol for Bucharest was first used on seals of the town's judet (mayor) and pârgari (town council) as early as the 16th century: it usually featured images of the Madonna and Child or the Annunciation, and was accompanied by an inscription in either Church Slavonic or Romanian, which were simply variations of the phrase "this is the seal of Bucharest".

Under the Organic Statute rule of Pavel Kiselyov, the city was awarded the new symbol of a standing woman wearing a shoulder sash and carrying the Scales of Justice (in 1862, the woman was seated, carrying both the scales and, in her left hand, flowers and ears of wheat).

According to Constantin C. Giurescu, Alexandru Ioan Cuza changed the seal to depict the patron saint and an image of the mythical shepherd Bucur. However, it appears that St Dimitrie Basarabov (or St Demetrius) was introduced as a symbol during Cuza's reign (in 1864, as attested by Monitorul Oficial). The arms were enlarged after World War I, when the mural crown and all other present-day elements were added, while the image of Bucur was removed.

Coat of arms of Bucharest in 1970–1989

No symbol was in use between 1948 and Nicolae Ceaușescu's reforms of 1970. Then a new coat of arms was adopted, which lasted until the Romanian Revolution of 1989; it represented "the most characteristic elements of historical traditions and of political, economic and social relations".

The 1970 coat of arms consisted of an escutcheon divided party per fess; chief, landscaped, an eagle, or, wings displayed, facing sinister, over the image of the Palace of the Patriarchate, argent, on an azure field; over a cogwheel, or, with an open book with the lettered motto CIVITAS (verso) and NOSTRA (recto) (reading "Civitas Nostra" (Latin for "Our City"), or, on a field, gules; with an inescutcheon divided party per pale, dexter a hammer and sickle (symbol of the Romanian Communist Party)) on a field, gules, sinister the flag of Romania, the inescutcheon charged with the crest of Communist Romania.

== See also ==
- History of Bucharest
