= Coat of arms of Yellowknife =

Coat of Arms of Yellowknife
- Armiger: Yellowknife, Northwest Territories
- Crest: wings with a sword
- Motto: Multim in Parvo

The coat of arms of Yellowknife is the full armorial achievement as used by the municipal government as an official symbol. The government of Yellowknife utilizes multiple versions of the coat of arms for various applications.

== History ==
In the 1950s Yellowknife held a competition to design a coat of arms which was won by Netta Pringle who had lived in Yellowknife during 1954 and 1955.

The coat of arms consists of a mine headframe, flanked by a miners' pick and shovel and a maple leaf, with the northern lights above. Above the shield is a half-midnight sun with a yellow knife and wings. The bottom of the arms contain the Latin motto of Yellowknife Multum in Parvo, (many things in a small place). The motto was proposed by Ted Horton, a local news editor and a carving of the crest currently hangs in Yellowknife City Hall.
