= Coat of arms of York =

Versions
- This version with cap of maintenance used for the Office of the Lord Mayor and City Council.
- Armiger: City of York Council
- Shield: Argent, on a cross Gules five lions passant guardant Or
- Other elements: Behind the shield, the civic sword and mace. Above a chapeau.

The coat of arms of York is that belonging to the City of York Council, the local authority of the City of York, North Yorkshire, England. The blazon of the arms is Argent, on a cross Gules five lions passant guardant Or.

The arms were first recorded in 1587 after a heraldic visitation of Yorkshire, however it is possible that they were granted during the reign of Edward III (1327–1377). Richard II granted the city the right to carry a sword and ceremonial mace in processions and for the bearer of the sword to wear a cap of maintenance or chapeau; since the eighteenth century the arms have sometimes depicted with the sword and mace crossed behind the shield and the cap above it, but these additions have not been officially granted by the College of Arms.

The local government of York has been reformed since the arms were first granted, however each time they have been transferred to the new local authority.

== Description ==
The blazon, or heraldic description, of the arms is Argent, on a cross Gules five lions passant guardant Or. They consist of a silver field with a red cross, upon which are five golden lions facing heraldic right (the viewer's left) with their right forelegs raised and their heads facing out.

The arms are sometimes shown with a civic sword and mace crossed behind the shield and a cap of maintenance or chapeau above. A cap of maintenance is a cap of crimson velvet with an ermine trim.

== History ==
The arms were recorded without tinctures (that is without colours) in 1587, following an heraldic visitation of Yorkshire in 1584. They may have originally been granted during the reign of Edward III (1327–1377).

Richard II presented a sword to the city in 1387 to be used in civic ceremonies and, in 1397, the right to carry a mace was granted by royal charter. A cap of maintenance was presented to the city by Richard in 1393. These symbols have been used with the arms since the 18th century but have not been officially granted by the College of Arms, the heraldic authority for England.

When the Corporation of the City of York was abolished in 1974 and replaced by York City Council the arms were transferred to the new authority. When that body was itself abolished in 1996 the arms were transferred again to the present unitary authority by order in council in 1997.
