= Armorial of districts in Rhineland-Palatinate =

List of coats of arms of the 24 districts and the 12 urban districts in Rhineland-Palatinate, Germany

== Districts ==
Ahrweiler	Altenkirchen	Alzey-Worms	Bad Dürkheim
Bad Kreuznach	Bernkastel-Wittlich	Birkenfeld	Bitburg-Prüm
Cochem-Zell	Daun	Donnersbergkreis	Germersheim
Kaiserslautern	Kusel	Rhein-Pfalz-Kreis	Mainz-Bingen
Mayen-Koblenz	Neuwied	Rhein-Hunsrück	Rhein-Lahn
Südliche Weinstraße	Südwestpfalz	Trier-Saarburg	Westerwaldkreis

== Urban districts ==
Frankenthal	Kaiserslautern	Koblenz	Landau
Ludwigshafen	Mainz	Neustadt an der Weinstraße	Pirmasens
Speyer	Trier	Worms	Zweibrücken
