= Coat of arms of Leeds =

The arms as used in the Council's former logo

The arms as used prior to 1921

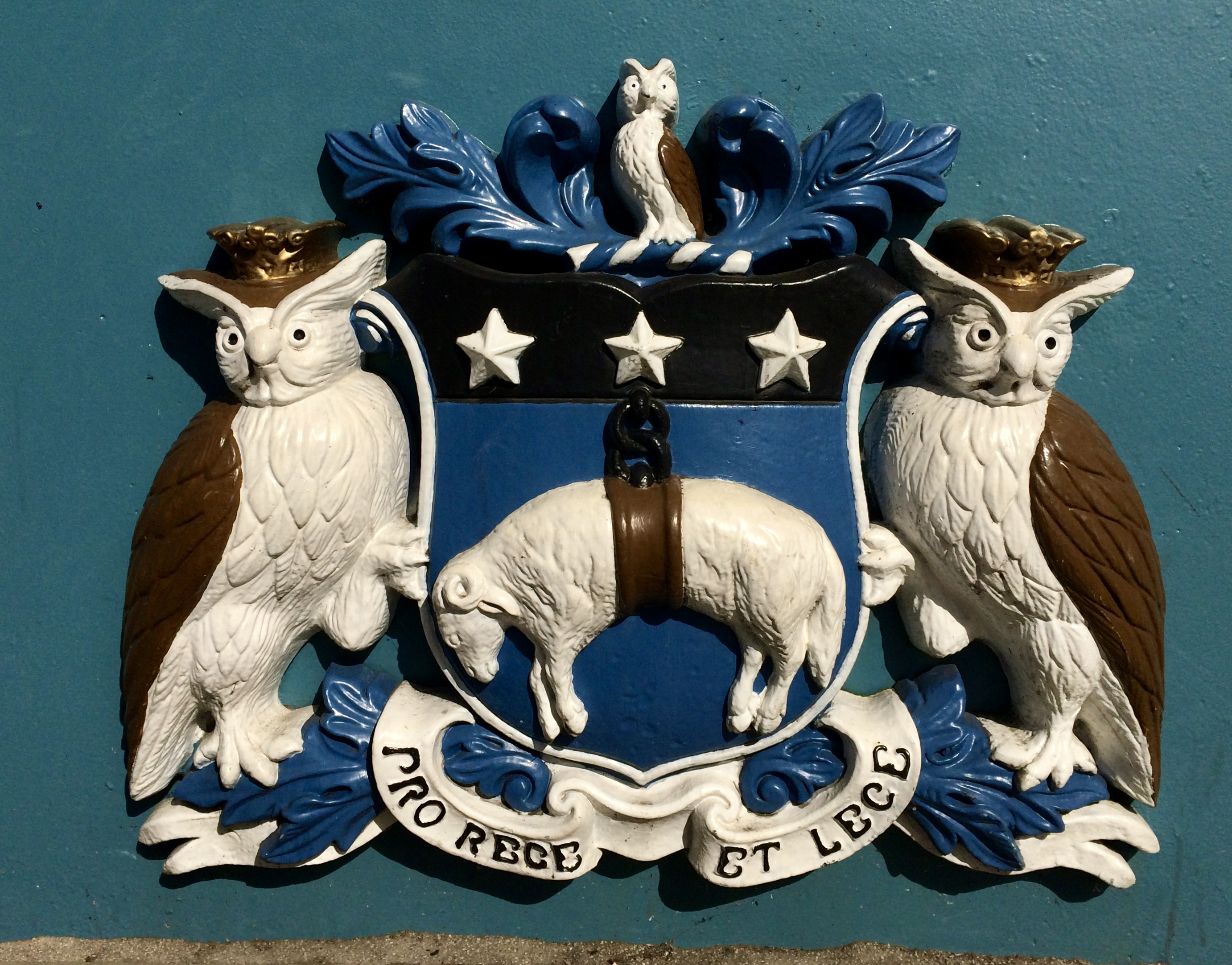
A relief of the coat of arms on Leeds Bridge

The Coat of arms of Leeds City Council derives its design from the seventeenth century. In 1662 the Borough of Leeds received a new charter which created the office of mayor, and the arms (the shield alone) seems to date from about this time as they incorporate part of the arms of the first mayor. These arms were recorded at the heraldic visitation of Yorkshire in 1666. By the time that the borough was reformed by the Municipal Corporations Act 1835, silver owls had been added both as crest above the shield, and as supporters on either side. These additions were not authorised, however, and in 1920 application was made by Leeds County Borough Council to the College of Arms to have these additions officially granted. In the following year the grant of crest and supporters was made, with the colouring of the owls altered to "proper", or natural colourings. Gold ducal coronets were added to the supporters for further heraldic difference.

In 1974, the county borough was abolished by the Local Government Act 1972, becoming part of a much larger Metropolitan District of Leeds. The new Leeds City Council continues to use the arms of its predecessor, but to date no application has been made for the formal transfer of the armorial bearings.

== Symbolism ==
- The coat of arms dates to the 1660s.
- Three stars taken from the coat of arms of Sir Thomas Danby who was the first Mayor of Leeds.
- The golden fleece, a sign of the wool stapler, symbolises the wool industry in the city.
- Three owls taken from the coat of arms of Sir John Savile who was the first Alderman of Leeds.
- The closed steel helmet is used by civic authorities.
- The Latin motto, Pro Rege Et Lege, means "For King and the law". Its motto is similar to the original used by the Australian capital of Canberra, which was granted its arms in 1928.

== Blazon ==
The formal description, or blazon, of the arms is:

- Arms: Azure, a fleece Or; on a chief Sable three mullets Argent.
- Crest: On a wreath Or and Azure, An owl Proper.
- Supporters: On either side an owl Proper ducally crowned Or.
- Motto: 'Pro Rege Et Lege'.

== Uses ==
The coat of arms was presented to the Leeds Volunteer Corps in 1794 to be used as part of their regimental colours.

== Sources ==
- G. Briggs, Civic and Corporate Heraldry, London 1971
- W. C. Scott-Giles, Civic Heraldry of England and Wales, 2nd edition, London, 1953
- A. C. Fox-Davies (1915). The Book of Public Arms. London. pp. 431–432. OL 23282328M.
