= Coat of arms of West Yorkshire =

Coat of arms of the West Yorkshire Metropolitan County Council in the UK

West Yorkshire County Council coat of arms

The Coat of arms of West Yorkshire Metropolitan County Council was granted in 1975 to the new Metropolitan county council created in the previous year. The County Council was abolished in 1986 under the provisions of the Local Government Act 1985 and consequently the arms are no longer used. The current West Yorkshire Combined Authority uses a wordmark consisting of the authority's name.

== Symbolism ==
- The shield is divided into five parts which represents the five districts that form the county. These divisions form a letter 'W' which, when comprised with the white rose of Yorkshire, graphically represent the county's name.
- The two lion supporters are taken from the Coat of arms of England. One supporter has an image of the sun while the other has a Yorkshire rose. These two symbols together formed part of the arms of the preceding council, West Riding County Council, as a Rose en Soleil.
- The compartment shows the hills of the Pennines which make up a large part of the western part of the county.

== Blazon ==
The formal description of the arms, or blazon, is:

For the arms: Or two Piles Azure a Rose Argent barbed and seeded proper; and for the crest: on a Wreath of the Colours a Mural Crown Or standing thereon a Lion rampant guardant per fess Gules and Tenne crowned Or bearing in its forepaws a Rose Argent barbed and seeded proper; and for the supporters: Dexter a Lion rampant guardant per fess Gules and Sable armed and langued Azure crowned and charged on the shoulder with a Sun in splendour Or sinister a Lion rampant guardant per fess Tenne and Vert armed and langued Gules crowned Or charged on the shoulder with a Rose Argent barbed and seeded proper, the whole upon a Compartment representing the Pennine Hills; and for the motto: 'By effort achieve'.
