= Moluccan diaspora =

Moluccan people living outside Indonesia

The Moluccan diaspora (Indonesian: Diaspora Maluku) refers to overseas Indonesians of Moluccan birth or descent living outside Indonesia. The most significant Moluccan diaspora community lives in the Netherlands, where it numbers c. 70,000 people as of 2018.

== Terminology ==
In the Netherlands, a number of names are in circulation to refer to its Moluccan community, which do not all technically refer to the same group of people. The most commonly used today is "Moluccan" (Dutch: Molukker), the term for the native, pre-Transmigrasi inhabitants of the Moluccan Islands.

One of the islands in the archipelago is Ambon. The Ambonese people constitute a clear majority of about 90% of Moluccan Dutch and, as a result, members of the Moluccan community are often referred to as "Ambonese" (Dutch: Ambonees), especially before 1970. The two terms are not synonymous, however, even though they continue to be used as such by both the Dutch and ethnic Ambonese.

Strictly speaking, "South Moluccan" (Dutch: Zuid-Molukker) refers to a proponent of the unrecognized Republic of the South Moluccas and is mainly used in political contexts in the Netherlands.

== History ==
=== The Netherlands ===
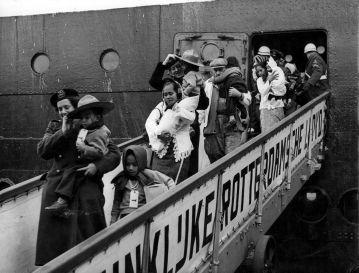
Moluccan evacuees disembark the SS Kota Inten in the Port of Rotterdam, 21–22 March 1951

Following the Indonesian War of Independence of 1945–1949, the government of the Netherlands transferred sovereignty over the Dutch East Indies to the United States of Indonesia on 27 December 1949. Attempts at disbanding the federation by the unitary Republic of Indonesia and Moluccan distrust of the predominantly Islamic Javanese authorities in Jakarta led to the creation of the Republic of South Maluku (Indonesian: Republik Maluku Selatan, RMS) on 25 April 1950. After the Indonesian invasion of South Maluku and suppression of Moluccan independence, the Dutch government decided on the evacuation of around 12,500 Moluccan soldiers of the former Royal Netherlands East Indies Army and their families to the Netherlands, as they were at risk of retribution and had refused discharge from Dutch service in territories controlled by Indonesian authorities. While the Dutch government had neither supported nor recognized the RMS, its supporters proclaimed a government-in-exile in the Netherlands on 12 April 1966. As of 2010, its president is the Dutch-born John Wattilete and its leadership is in the hands of second-generation Moluccan Dutch.

Fueled by inaction of Moluccan community leaders and government disinterest for the plight of the diaspora, radicalized Free South Moluccan Youths were responsible for a number of terrorist attacks in the Netherlands. These were an arson attempt on the Indonesian embassy in The Hague in 1966, attempted abductions of Indonesian ambassadors in 1970 and 1974, a foiled attempt to abduct Queen Juliana in March 1975, the Wijster train hijacking and Indonesian consulate hostage crisis of December 1975, the De Punt train hijacking and Bovensmilde school hostage crisis of 1977, and the Assen province hall hostage crisis of 1978. Combined, these so-called "Moluccan Actions" (Dutch: Molukse Acties) resulted in the deaths of seven civilians, six attackers, and a policeman, and remain controversial.

On 21 June 2026, Prime Minister Rob Jetten apologized on behalf of the Dutch government to the Moluccan community for the soldiers' discharge and their inadequate reception and housing.

== Notable individuals ==
=== Media and entertainment ===
- Monica Akihary – singer
- Esther Apituley – violinist
- Martijn Apituley – actor and writer
- Lady Bee – DJ and music producer
- Jimi Bellmartin – singer
- Marc Benjamin – DJ and music producer
- Cesqeaux – DJ and music producer
- Jiggy Djé – music producer and rapper
- Ronnie Flex – rapper and television personality
- Roger Goudsmit – actor
- Baby Huwae – actress, model, and singer
- Dennis Huwaë – celebrity chef
- Herman Keppy – journalist and writer
- Rikkie Kollé – model
- Carolyn Lilipaly – actress and journalist
- Delano Limaheluw – actor, journalist, and radio personality
- Julya Lo'ko – singer
- Ming Luhulima – guitarist and singer
- Johnny Manuhutu – music composer and singer
- Uriël Matahelumual – film director and producer
- Zeth Mustamu – pastor and percussionist
- Gerson Oratmangoen – actor, film director, and screenwriter
- Kraantje Pappie – rapper and television personality
- Justine Pelmelay – singer
- Joenoes Polnaija – actor
- Russo – DJ, music producer, and rapper
- Daniël Sahuleka – singer-songwriter
- ADF Samski – actor and rapper
- Esther-Claire Sasabone – radio personality
- Kim Sasabone – singer
- Terence Schreurs – actress, dancer, and singer
- Juan Seleky – civil servant, publisher, and writer
- Maurice Seleky – jurist, media personality, and writer
- Sterre – singer
- Jim Taihuttu - DJ, film director and producer, and screenwriter
- Jiri Taihuttu – guitarist, music producer, and rapper
- Zoë Tauran – singer
- Amber Teterissa – actress
- Rocky Tuhuteru – radio and television producer
- Nienke van Dijk – actress and television personality
- Wies van Groningen – writer
- Vinchenzo – singer
- The Viper – DJ and music producer
- Rudi Wairata – guitarist and singer
- Jordan Wayne – music producer
- Wudstik – music composer, rapper, and singer
- Valerie Zwikker – television personality

=== Politics ===
- John Lilipaly – Dutch politician
- Johan Manusama – third RMS president-in-exile
- Sam Pormes – Dutch politician
- Grace Tanamal – Dutch politician
- Frans Tutuhatunewa – fourth RMS president-in-exile
- John Wattilete – fifth RMS president-in-exile

=== Sports ===
- Bert Aipassa – football player
- Esther Akihary – sprinter
- Marichelle de Jong – boxer and boxing coach
- Jamarro Diks – football player
- Kevin Diks – football player
- Navarone Foor – football player
- Jaëll Hattu – football player
- Tom Hiariej – football player
- Xander Houtkoop – football player
- Regilio Jacobs – football player
- Nigel de Jong – football player
- Ferdinand Katipana – football player
- Loreanne Kuhurima – sprinter
- Denny Landzaat – football coach and player
- Bart Latuheru – football player
- Cayfano Latupeirissa – football player
- Jeffrey Leiwakabessy – football player
- Stefano Lilipaly – football player
- Dominggus Lim-Duan – football coach and player
- Misha Latuhihin – volleyball player
- Hanky Leatemia – football coach and player
- Eli Louhenapessy – football player
- Jos Luhukay – football coach and player
- Gayle Mahulette – badminton player
- Djenahro Nunumete – football player
- Izac Nunumete – football player
- Ragnar Oratmangoen – football player
- Dicky Palyama – badminton player
- Edinho Pattinama – football player
- Jordao Pattinama – football player
- Ton Pattinama – football player
- Shayne Pattynama – football player
- Joey Pelupessy – football player
- Bobby Petta – football player
- Tijjani Reijnders – football player
- David Ririhena – football player
- Levi Risamasu – football player
- Gaston Salasiwa – football player
- Joas Siahaija – football player
- Sonny Silooy – football coach and player
- Rebecca Soumeru – softball player
- Christian Supusepa – football player
- Raphael Supusepa – football coach and player
- Simon Tahamata – football coach and player
- Justin Tahapary – football player
- Jerry Taihuttu – football coach and player
- John Taihuttu – football coach and player
- Elise Tamaëla – tennis coach and player
- Randy Thenu – football player
- Michael Timisela – football player
- Ignacio Tuhuteru – football player
- Jordy Tutuarima – football player
- Giovanni van Bronckhorst – football coach and player
- Michael van der Mark – motorcycle racer
- Danny van Dijk – football player
- Sergio van Dijk – football player
- Benjamin van Leer – football player
- Tobias Waisapy – football player

=== Others ===
- Coosje Ayal – World War II resistance fighter
- Semuel Metiarij – pastor
- Isaac Julius Tamaëla – Moluccan independence activist and soldier
- Hassan Tan – general practitioner
- Hansina Uktolseja – Moluccan independence activist
- Daniel Uneputty – outlaw motorcycle club president and tattoo artist
- Louina Walakutty-Salamena – Moluccan Dutch community leader
