= List of Moluccan people =

This is a list of Moluccan people; people of Maluku Islands descent.

== Historical figures ==
- Pattimura, Moluccan soldier and freedom fighter
- Martha Christina Tiahahu, Moluccan freedom fighter

== Military ==
- Josef Muskita

== Police ==
- Karel Satsuit Tubun

== Politicians ==
- Ali Alwi, politician
- Taslim Azis
- Peter M. Christian
- Dick de Hoog
- Husnie Hentihu
- Murad Ismail
- Bahlil Lahadalia, businessman and politician
- Johannes Leimena
- John Lilipaly
- Alexander Litaay, diplomat
- Johan Manusama
- Melkias Agustinus Pellaupessy
- Adam Rahayaan, politician and incumbent mayor
- G.A. Siwabessy
- Max Sopacua
- Chris Soumokil, politician and former first president of the Republic of South Maluku
- Melani Leimena Suharli
- Julius Tahija
- Frans Tutuhatunewa

== Athletes ==
- Ilham Armaiyn, football
- Jamarro Diks, football
- Kevin Diks, football
- Navarone Foor, football
- Massaro Glunder, kickboxing
- Tom Hiariej, football
- Xander Houtkoop, football
- Ferdinand Katipana, football
- Hasyim Kipuw, football
- Denny Landzaat, football
- Bart Latuheru, football
- Misha Latuhihin, volleyball
- Cayfano Latupeirissa, football
- Noa Leatomu, football
- Jeffrey Leiwakabessy, football
- Manahati Lestusen, football
- Stefano Lilipaly, football
- Dominggus Lim-Duan, football
- Chris Limahelu, American football
- Eli Louhenapessy, football
- Estella Loupatty, football
- Jos Luhukay, football and trainer
- Rexy Mainaky, badminton
- Bellaetrix Manuputty, badminton
- Diego Michiels, football
- Jason Oost, football
- Dicky Palyama, badminton
- Edinho Pattinama, football
- Jordao Pattinama, football
- Ton Pattinama, football and trainer
- Shayne Pattynama, football
- Joey Pelupessy, football
- Bobby Petta, football
- Ellyas Pical, boxer
- Rizky Pora, football
- Rochy Putiray, football
- Eliano Reijnders, football
- Tijjani Reijnders, football
- Levi Risamasu, football
- Ricardo Salampessy, football
- Gaston Salasiwa, football
- Sonny Silooy, football
- Christian Supusepa, football
- Simon Tahamata, football
- Justin Tahapary, football
- Jerry Taihuttu, football and trainer
- Elise Tamaëla, tennis
- Michael Timisela, football
- Ignacio Tuhuteru, football
- Alfin Tuasalamony, football
- Jordy Tutuarima, football
- Giovanni van Bronckhorst, football and trainer
- Sergio van Dijk, football
- Tobias Waisapy, football
- Zulham Zamrun, football

== Entertainers ==
- Cesqeaux, DJ
- Glenn Fredly, singer-songwriter
- Melly Goeslaw, singer-songwriter (half Sundanese)
- Mohammad Ridwan Hafiedz, song script writer
- Carolyn Lilipaly, presenter
- Ziva Magnolya, singer
- Susanty Manuhutu, Puteri indonesia 1995, Miss Universe Indonesia 1995
- Eric Papilaya, singer
- Justine Pelmelay, singer
- Ruth Pelupessy, actress and model
- Jonas Rivanno, actor and singer
- Ruth Sahanaya, pop singer
- Daniël Sahuleka, singer
- Kim Sasabone, singer

== See also ==
- List of Acehnese people
- List of Batak people
- List of Bugis people
- List of Chinese Indonesians
- List of Javanese people
- List of Minangkabau people
- List of Sundanese people
