= Free South Moluccan Youths =

Defunct Moluccan terrorist group

- Vrije Zuidmolukse Jongeren; Pemuda Masjarakat RMS
- Leader: Etty Aponno
- Founded: 1966
- Allegiance: South Moluccas
- Active regions: Netherlands
- Ideology: Moluccan nationalism

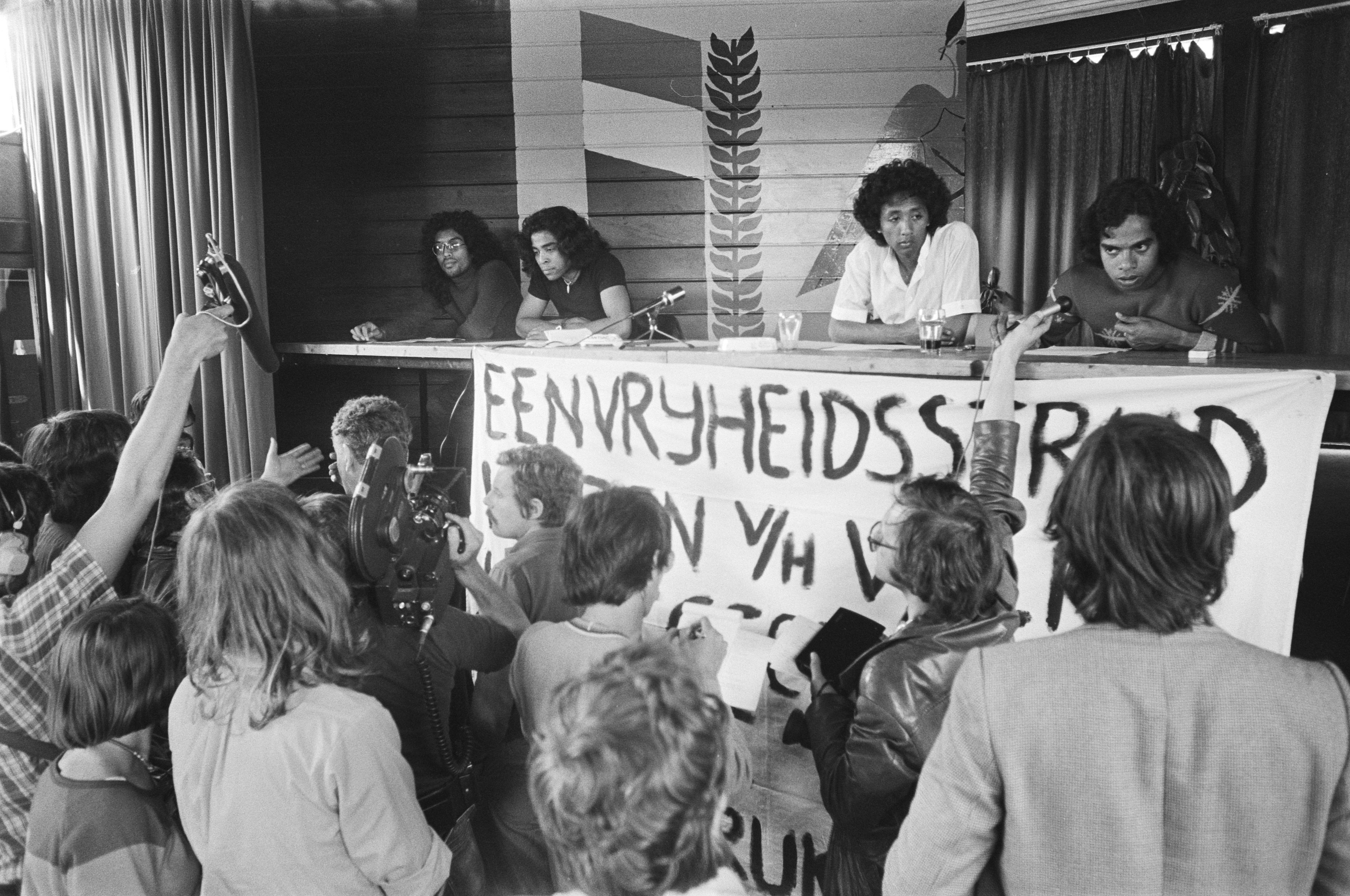
Press conference of the Free South Moluccan Youths in Assen, 1977

The Free South Moluccan Youths (Note: Dutch: Vrije Zuidmolukse Jongeren (VZJ); Indonesian: Pemuda Masyarakat RMS, lit. 'Youth of the RMS Community', ER: Pemuda Masjarakat RMS (PMRMS)) (FSMY) was a militant Moluccan youth organization with the declared goal of restoring the independence of the Republic of South Maluku (Indonesian: Republik Maluku Selatan, RMS) from Indonesia. The group was active in the Dutch Moluccan diaspora, and its members and factions committed various acts of nationalist terrorism in the Netherlands in the 1970s.

== History ==
The earliest action involving the FSMY was an arson attempt on the Indonesian embassy in Scheveningen on the night of 26–27 July 1966, in response to Indonesia's execution of the second president of the RMS, Chris Soumokil. Damages were estimated at 75,000 guilders and a total of 19 arrests were made.

The group's first high-profile attack took place in 1970, after the announcement of a state visit of Indonesian President Suharto to the Netherlands. On the morning of 31 August, 33 youths stormed the official residence of Indonesian Ambassador Taswin Almanik Natadiningrat in Wassenaar to take him hostage and demand a meeting between Suharto and Johan Manusama, the third president of the RMS. Natadiningrat managed to escape, but policeman Hans Moolenaar was fatally shot during the attack. The Moluccan youths then seized eight other people, including the ambassador's wife and two children. After a 12-hour standoff, the group learned that Suharto had decided to postpone his visit and they surrendered to the police. The attackers were sentenced to prison terms ranging from four months to three years. A second attempt to kidnap the Indonesian ambassador on 25 April 1974 also failed because the ambassador was not at home.

They went on to hijack trains in 1975 and 1977, engaged in two or three shootings, and had five aborted plans of kidnapping and hijackings. Also in 1975, they attempted to kidnap Queen Juliana, but were arrested on the drive to Soestdijk Palace. South Moluccan groups and the Dutch government signed a "peace treaty" in 1986.

By the summer of 2000, a new group calling itself the Free Moluccan Youths (Dutch: Vrije Molukse Jongeren, VMJ) threatened Ministers Wim Kok, Jozias van Aartsen, and Roger van Boxtel with violence if they did not raise the issue of the Maluku sectarian conflict in Indonesia with the international community. Two spokesmen for the group were arrested but released without charge after tensions among Dutch Moluccans eased. The VMJ was also suspected of responsibility for arson attempts on Moordrecht town hall and Apeldoorn courthouse on the night of 16 August 1999. In the years since, the group has limited itself to internet activism, flyering, and peaceful protest, such as a demonstration against King Willem-Alexander's presence at the unveiling of the Vossenbosch artwork in Wierden on 1 July 2022.

== See also ==
- List of terrorist incidents in the Netherlands
- Maluku Sovereignty Front
- Faciliteitenwet
