= Taihuttu =

Taihuttu is a Moluccan surname. Notable people with the surname include:

- Didi Taihuttu (born 1978), Dutch entrepreneur, traveler, author, writer and public speaker
- Jerry Taihuttu (born 1970), Dutch football coach and former footballer
- John Taihuttu (1954–2016), Dutch former footballer
- M.J. Hans Taihuttu (1909–unknown), Indonesian footballer
