= Pattinama =

Pattinama (sometime spelled as Pattynama), is a surname of Moluccan origin. It may refer to:

- Edinho Pattinama (born 1989), Dutch footballer
- Jordao Pattinama (born 1989), Dutch footballer
- Shayne Pattynama (born 1998), Dutch-born Indonesian footballer
- Ton Pattinama (born 1956), Dutch footballer

== See also ==
- Lesley Pattinama Kerkhove
