= Supusepa =

Supusepa is a Moluccan surname. Notable people with the surname include:

- Christian Supusepa (born 1989), Dutch footballer
- Raphael Supusepa (born 1978), Dutch retired footballer
