= Lilipaly =

Lilipaly is a surname. Notable people with the surname include:

- Carolyn Lilipaly (born 1969), Dutch television news presenter and actress
- John Lilipaly (1943–2022), Dutch politician
- Stefano Lilipaly (born 1990), Dutch-Indonesian footballer
