= Faciliteitenwet =

Netherlands nationality law

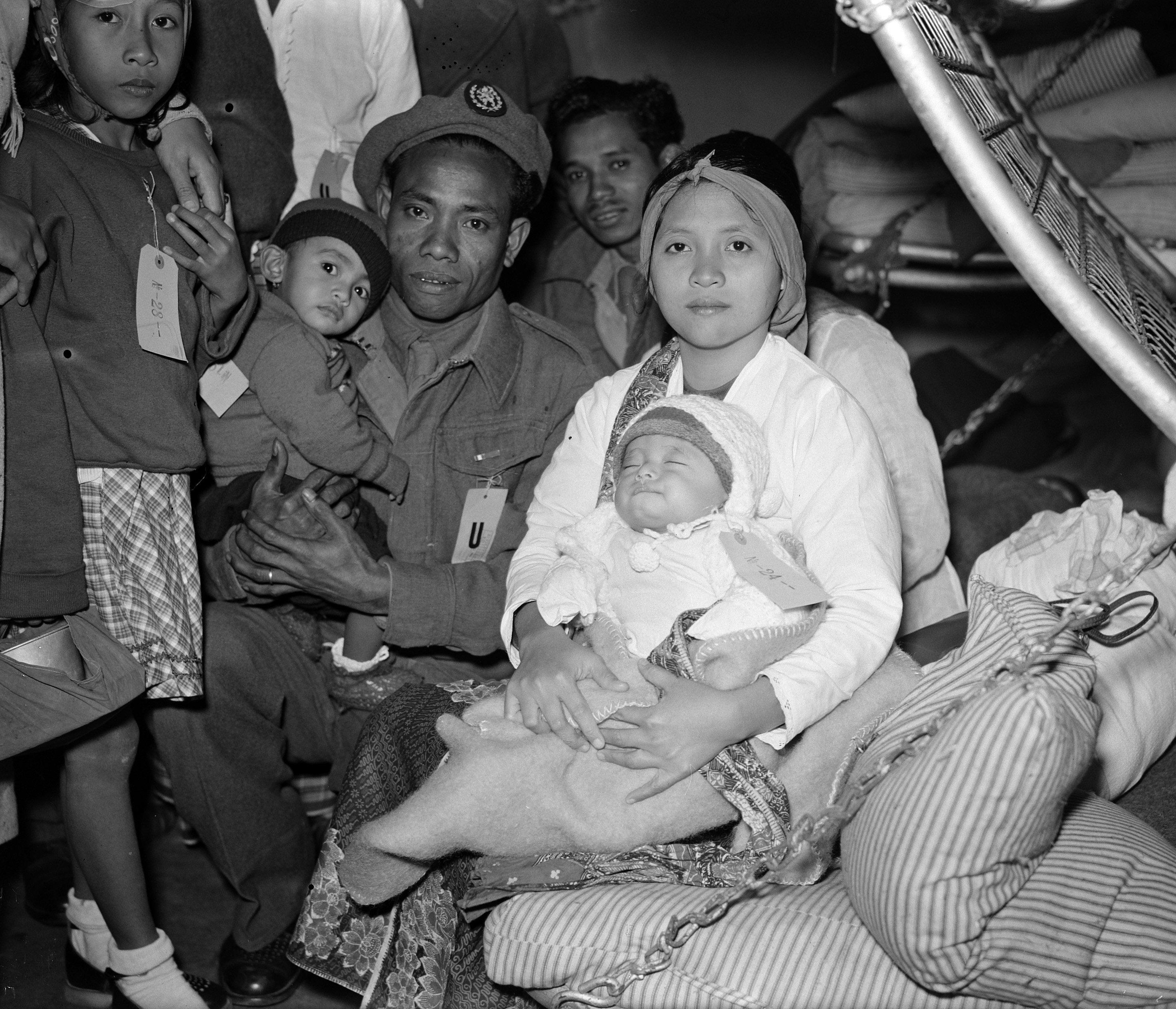
Arrival Kota Inten with Ambonese (KNIL) 22 March 1951 Rotterdam

The Faciliteitenwet (English: Facilities Act), also known as the "Act on the Position of Moluccans", regulates the position of Moluccans living in the Netherlands who do not hold Dutch nationality.

== Background ==
In 1951, more than 4,000 Moluccans enlisted in the KNIL colonial forces came to the Netherlands on the basis of a military order. Together with their families, they were housed in residential locations throughout the Netherlands: in total around 12,500 people. The KNIL was abolished in 1950 and the soldiers were demobilized shortly after arrival in the Netherlands. The ambition initially was that the Moluccans would return to a future independent Moluccas as quickly as possible; hence the legal status of the Moluccans was kept vague. When it turned out that no return was possible in the long term, it took decades for the Moluccans to gain a clear legal position in the Netherlands.

== Statelessness ==
Upon arrival, all Moluccans were granted 'foreign status' because they rejected Dutch nationality and insisted on a return to the independent Republic of the South Moluccas. As a result of the Indonesian Nationality Act of 1958. most Moluccans in the Netherlands lost Indonesian citizenship and became stateless. In the 1970s, the number of Moluccans in the Netherlands had grown to 30,000 persons. Most of them still believed in an independent Moluccan Republic, and did not wish to obtain Dutch citizenship. After the 1975 Dutch train hostage crisis and other violent actions, the Dutch government decided to improve the situation of the Moluccans. It offered the Moluccans (almost) equal rights to Dutch citizens, without making them Dutch citizens. the Dutch government met the Moluccans in 1976 with a special law (the so-called Wet betreffende de positie van Molukkers) to equate the legal position of Moluccans residing in the Netherlands with Dutch citizens. Moluccans who fall under this law have no right to participate in elections, national and European. The third generation of Moluccans should get Dutch nationality by law.

== Facilities passport ==
The Moluccans who were staying in the Netherlands only received a facility passport. The words 'Dutch nationality' were crossed out and it was specifically indicated that those involved were treated as Dutch nationals. Due to many problems with traveling abroad, it was decided in 1991 to also offer the possibility of applying for a Dutch passport with the mention of Dutch nationality. Unlike the mention of Dutch nationality in the Dutch travel document, the persons involved do not actually have Dutch nationality but are legally stateless. Today only a small number of Moluccan inhabitants of the Netherlands, probably less than 1000 persons, still have this status.

== See also ==
- Invasion of Ambon
- Indonesian nationality law
- Chris Soumokil
