= Manusama =

Manusama is a Moluccan surname. Notable people with the surname include:

- Chris Manusama (born 1952), Indonesian preacher and songwriter
- Johan Manusama (1910–1995), Moluccan-Dutch politician
