= National Socialist Movement in the Dutch East Indies =

National Socialist Movement in the Dutch East Indies Nationaal-Socialistische Beweging in Nederlands-Indië
- Founded: 1933
- Dissolved: 1940
- Membership: ~5000 (1935); ~1100 (1940)
- Ideology: Nazism; Fascism; Dutch nationalism Indo interests Indo homeland
- Political position: Far-right
- National affiliation: Nationaal-Socialistische Beweging in Nederland

The National Socialist Movement in the Dutch East Indies (Dutch: Nationaal-Socialistische Beweging in Nederlands-Indië) or the Indies NSB (Dutch: Indische NSB) for short was a branch of the Dutch National Socialist Movement in the Dutch East Indies. It included members who were Indos of mixed Dutch and Indonesian descent, though the exact number is unclear. The party was founded in 1933.

== History ==
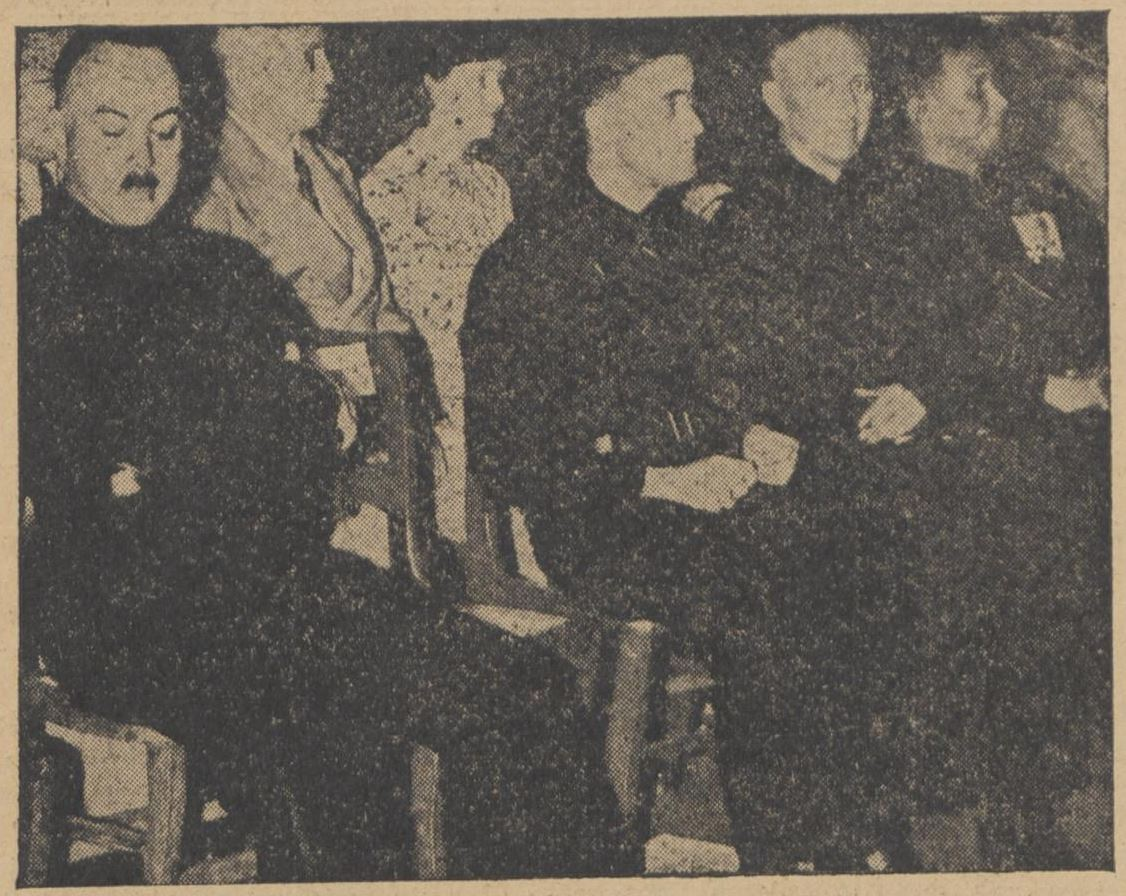
Nationaal-Socialistische Beweging members in Batavia, 1938. Theo Becking is 2nd from the right.

Many of the party's supporters had become members for different reasons than supporters of the NSB in the Netherlands. The rise of Indonesian nationalism and the Japanese threat was for many ultranationalist Indos reason to join. Another reason was the feeling among Indos that as party members they were equal to Totoks ('pure blooded' Dutch). The party flourished from 1933, and after a visit of Anton Mussert to the colony in 1935, membership peaked at around 5000. The party's membership began to decline rapidly in the late 1930s, when the NSB, taking from the Nazi Party, started adopting more racialist and Blut und Boden views. The party retained around 1100 members and 680 sympathisers.

The government banned membership of the party for civil servants on 9 May 1940, immediately after its European counterpart entered into collaboration with Nazi Germany. Around 500 members of the party were arrested on the orders of governor-general Alidius Tjarda van Starkenborgh.

Most members of the party left for the Netherlands following the Japanese surrender and Indonesian independence war. There they were treated equally to Dutch NSB members who had renounced their membership prior to 10 May 1940. Most of its members, unlike their Dutch counterparts, did not commit treason and were pardoned in 1947.

== Notable members ==
- Johan Manusama (1910–1995), third president of the Republic of South Maluku
- Theo Becking (1887–1945), Dutch military officer and fascist politician
- Johan Gijsbert van Houten (1895–1986), Mayor of Dordrecht, Oostvoorne, Brielle and Gorinchem

== See also ==
- List of political parties in Indonesia
- Indo people
- Indonesian Fascist Party
