= FKM (disambiguation) =

FKM may refer to:

- FKM, a family of fluoroelastomers as defined in ASTM D1418
- Maluku Sovereignty Front (FKM, Indonesian: Front Kedaulatan Maluku), an Indonesian rebel group
- Fakiragram railway station, and Indian Railways station
- FKM Nové Zámky, a Slovak football team
- FKM (guideline), a guideline to assess the resistance of mechanical components, commonly named after Forschungskuratorium Maschinenbau (the research association that developed it)
