= Chris Langewis =

Christiaan Langewis (April 14, 1946 – April 21, 2006) was a language technology pioneer, businessman, and instructor.

Langewis was born in the Netherlands, to Hillegonda and Cornelis Langewis from Wormerveer, who emigrated their family in 1954 to the United States. After two years in Kansas City, the family moved to Walnut Creek, California. Christiaan studied Economics and Business Administration at California State University, Hayward.

He managed the creation of new technology for machine translation and computer-aided translation tools, as well as trained thousands of engineers and managers on localization processes and technologies within major corporate environments.

In 1996 Langewis joined the Monterey Institute of International Studies to establish a curriculum for computer-assisted translation, a course he taught until 2004. He died at the age of 60 in Fremont, California, and was survive by his wife Nathalia Uneida and two children.
