= Manuhutu =

Manuhutu is a Moluccan surname. Notable people with the surname include:

- Johanis Manuhutu (1908–1984), South Moluccan politician
- Susanty Manuhutu (born 1974), Indonesian model
