= Invasion of Ambon =

Indonesian military operation against Republic of South Maluku

- Part of Indonesian invasion of South Maluku
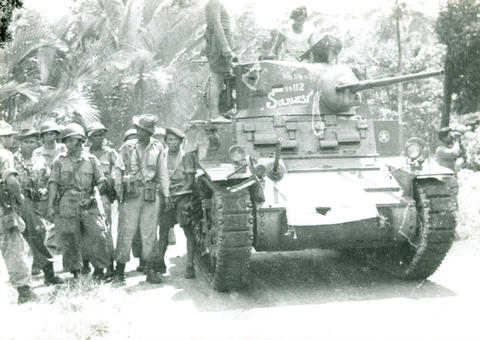
- Indonesian Army M3 Stuart tank and troops patrolling in Ambon
Date	28 September – 5 November 1950 (1 month, 1 week and 1 day)
Location	Ambon
Result	Indonesian victory
Territorial changes	Moluccas incorporated by Indonesia

Belligerents
Indonesia	Republic of South Maluku

Commanders and leaders
Sukarno; Alexander Evert Kawilarang; Abdul Haris Nasution; Slamet Rijadi †; Achmad Wiranatakusumah; Soerjo Soebandrio; Zainul Arifin Pohan	Chris Soumokil (executed); Isaac Julius Tamaëla (executed); A. Nanlohy (executed); Adjutant Sopacua (executed); Adjutant Tahapary †; Adjutant Siwabessy †

Strength
~20,000 personnel; Included units: Regular army forces; Battalion 3 Mei (Manadonese ex‑KNIL); Former Hizbullah militia; ex‑KNIL Foreign officers; Equipment: B‑25 Mitchell bombers; Dutch ships (ex-naval & KPM); Artillery pieces; Several tanks (operated by Dutch ex‑KNIL soldiers)	~800 local militia and ~200 RMS personnel in Ambon; Equipment (KNIL stocks): B‑25 Mitchell bombers; Patrol craft / naval vessels; Armoured vehicles (light tanks); Did not participate: ~4,000 RMS-aligned former KNIL personnel located outside the Moluccas (not involved in the fighting, blocked by the Dutch at Indonesia’s request).

Casualties and losses
~5,000 APRIS personnel killed; APRIS records: ~2,645 killed, 43 missing; figures may be understated.; Total casualties (including wounded and missing) ~10,000	~100 RMS soldiers and ~400 youth militia
- 5,000–8,000 civilians killed

The Invasion of Ambon (Indonesian: Invasi Ambon) was a combined Indonesian military operation which aimed to seize and annex the self-proclaimed Republic of South Maluku (Republik Maluku Selatan, abbreviated RMS).

== Background ==
Following the Dutch-Indonesian Round Table Conference, the Netherlands recognized the independence of the Republic of United States of Indonesia (RUSI). The RUSI was a federation with a People's Representative Council consisting of 50 representatives from the Republic of Indonesia and 100 from the various states according to their populations.

Republic of United States of Indonesia (RUSI).

Distrusting the Javanese and Muslim-dominated Republic of Indonesia, the largely Protestant and pro-Dutch South Moluccans - who had long contributed forces to the Royal Netherlands East Indies Army (KNIL) - declared the independence of the Republic of South Maluku in Ambon and Seram on 25 April 1950. The declaration was led by former East Indonesia justice minister Christiaan Robbert Steven Soumokil, while Johanis Manuhutu was made president of the new republic.

The independence declaration said the South Moluccas no longer felt secure within State of East Indonesia and were cutting their ties with RUSI. And later, former KNIL soldiers garrisoned at Ambon joined RMS and formed Armed Forces of RMS (APRMS). These are among troops who have been awaiting demobilization or transfer to the Armed Forces of RIS (APRIS).

On 17 August 1950, Indonesian President Sukarno proclaimed the restoration of the unitary state of the Republic of Indonesia. This RMS was not acknowledged by Sukarno and on his orders, the Indonesian military invaded the Moluccan island of Buru and a part of the island of Ceram.

During this period, the United States, wary of rising communist influence in Southeast Asia, strongly backed Indonesian territorial unity and viewed President Sukarno as a critical anti-communist leader—despite the fact that the Indonesian military had not secured major victories during the first and second Dutch military interventions in 1947 and 1948. At the same time, the military reputation of Ambonese ex-KNIL troops—highly disciplined, battle-hardened, and loyal to Dutch command structures—was a source of unease within the Indonesian leadership. According to postwar memoirs and internal reports, President Sukarno feared that Ambonese-led rebellions like the RMS could pose a serious threat, given their training, organizational cohesion, and elite status within the former colonial army.

== Invasion of Ambon ==
At the time of the RMS proclamation, there were 7,345 former KNIL troops stationed in Ambon, including 2,500 Ambonese. These soldiers became the backbone of APRMS. After a naval blockade by the Indonesian navy, an invasion of Ambon took place on 28 September 1950. The APRMS fled from the town of Ambon before the invading Indonesian troops had taken up positions in old Dutch fortifications in the hills overlooking the town. From here they waged guerrilla warfare. The TNI occupied the northern half of the island, but had been halted by fierce Ambonese resistance at the one kilometre wide isthmus, which links it with the southern half. On 5 November the city of Ambon came into the hands of the Indonesian army. The RMS government fled to Ceram in December to continue the war in the form of a guerrilla warfare. "The town of Ambon had been wiped out except for four buildings," an eyewitness told an Australian newspaper. "The Indonesians had constantly shelled the town and planes had strafed it, but much of the destruction had been caused by arson." The fighting was ferocious, since TNI's opposition were well-trained former KNIL soldiers including the Green Caps. The Indonesian army suffered severe losses. Although the RMS soldiers were KNIL members which were well-trained and renowned for their fighting skills, the resistance of the APRMS soldiers was eventually put down in November 1950. However, Lt. Col. Slamet Rijadi who was the commander of the Indonesian army in the Maluku sector and an important participant during the offensive was killed during the final day of the campaign.

== Dutch betrayal ==
During the Indonesian National Revolution, the Dutch had to disband the reinstated KNIL, and the native soldiers had the choice of either being demobilised or joining the army of the Republic of Indonesia. Due to a deep distrust of the Republican leadership, which was predominantly Javanese Muslim, this was an extremely difficult choice for the Protestant Ambonese, and only a minority chose to serve with the Indonesian Army. Disbanding proved a complicated process and, in 1951, two years after the transfer of sovereignty, not all soldiers had been demobilised. The Dutch were under severe international pressure to disband the colonial army and temporarily made these men part of the regular Dutch army, while trying to demobilise them in Java. Herein lay the source of the discontent among the Moluccan soldiers as, according to the KNIL policy, soldiers had the right to choose the place where they were to be discharged at the end of their contract. The political situation in the new Republic of Indonesia was initially unstable and, in particular, controversy over a federal or centralised form of the state resulted in armed conflicts in which Ambonese ex-KNIL men were involved. In 1950 an independent Republic of the South Moluccas (Indonesian: RMS, Republik Maluku Selatan) was proclaimed at Ambon. The RMS had strong support among the Ambonese KNIL soldiers. As a consequence the Moluccan soldiers located outside the South Moluccas demanded to be discharged at Ambon. But Indonesia refused to let the Dutch transport these soldiers to Ambon as long as the RMS was not repressed, fearing prolonged military struggle. When after heavy fighting the RMS was repressed at Ambon, the soldiers refused to be discharged there. They now demanded to be demobilised at Seram, where pockets of resistance against Indonesia still existed. This was again blocked by Indonesia.

The Dutch government finally decided to transport the remaining men and their families to the Netherlands. They were discharged on arrival and 'temporarily' housed in camps until it was possible for them to return to the Moluccan islands. In this way around 12,500 persons were settled in the Netherlands, more or less against their will and certainly also against the original plans of the Dutch government.

== Order of Battle ==
The Indonesian campaign against the Republic of South Maluku (RMS) was organized into three task groups under the command of the Indonesian Armed Forces (APRIS), consisting of battalions, artillery, armor, and engineers, all of which suffered significant casualties. Alongside regular TNI personnel, the operation included numerous former KNIL soldiers and officers of diverse backgrounds. Batalyon 3 Mei (Manado ex-KNIL and pro-Indonesian militias), Batalyon Abdullah (ex-Hizbullah fighters), and Central Javanese units under Letkol Slamet Riyadi played key roles. Ex-KNIL officers such as Captain Klees (a Dutch sergeant commanding armored units), Captain Erwin Claproth (a Makassarese-German battalion commander), and Josef "Joost" Muskita (an Ambonese officer attached under TNI command) participated directly. In the air campaign, Mayor Noordhaven, an Ambonese Dutch ex-KNIL pilot, flew B-25 bombers.

=== Indonesian use of Dutch vessels and support ===
The Koninklijke Paketvaart Maatschappij (KPM), founded in 1888 and based in Amsterdam with its operational headquarters in Batavia, operated hundreds of steamers across the Indonesian archipelago. After the transfer of sovereignty at the 1949 Round Table Conference, its ships and crews remained Dutch-owned, forcing the Indonesian government to rely on KPM vessels for both civilian and military transport. At the same time, the new Indonesian Navy (ALRI) began operating several corvettes, minesweepers, and landing craft transferred from the Royal Netherlands Navy under the agreement. Efforts to nationalize the inter-island network through PEPUSKA in 1950 failed, and only with the establishment of Pelni in 1952 did Indonesia gain a state-owned alternative. During the Ambon campaign against the Republic of South Maluku (RMS) in 1950, Indonesian troops were transported on KPM ships alongside these ex-Dutch naval vessels, as the TNI had very limited sealift capacity of its own.

=== Indonesian Forces (APRIS) ===
Group I

- Commander: Mayor Achmad Wiranatakusumah
- Estimated strength: ~6,000 personnel
- Units and losses:
  - Batalyon 3 Mei – 392 KIA
    - Commander: Mayor Alex Mengko
  - Batalyon Lukas Kastardjo – 262 KIA
    - Commander: Captain Lukas Kastardjo
  - Batalyon Poniman – 149 KIA
    - Commander: Captain Poniman
  - Additional reinforcements (unspecified)

Group II

- Commander: Slamet Rijadi † (Killed in action during the final phase of the battle)
- Estimated strength: ~7,000 personnel
- Units and losses:
  - Batalyon Worang – 260 KIA
    - Commander: Mayor Hein Victor Worang
  - Batalyon Claporth – 112 KIA
    - Commander: Captain Erwin Claproth
  - Batalyon Mahmud – 181 KIA
    - Commander: Captain Mahmud Pasha
  - Batalyon Soeradji – losses not specified
    - Commander: Mayor Soeradji
  - Supporting units:
    - Batalyon Pelupessy – Commander: Mayor Pelupessy (Ambonese)
    - Cavalry Tank Unit – Commander: Captain Klees

Group III

- Commander: Mayor Soerjo Soebandrio
- Estimated strength: ~5,000 personnel
- Units and losses:
  - Batalyon Tengkorak Putih – 195 KIA
  - Batalyon 352 Gadjah Merah – 210 KIA
  - Batalyon Soetarno – 189 KIA
    - Commander: Mayor Soetarno
  - Detasemen Faah – losses not specified
    - Commander: Captain Faah
  - Supporting units:
    - Detasemen Artileri Medan
    - Skuadron Panser
    - Zeni Pioneer

Naval and Air Support

- Indonesian Navy (ALRI), commanded by Rear Admiral John Lie
  - KRI Patiunus – Commander: Mayor Laut Rais
  - KRI Banteng
  - KRI Rajawali
- Indonesian Air Force (AURI):
  - B-25 bombers flown by Mayor Noordraven and Lt. Ismail

Other Named Officers Killed in Action:

- Letkol Soediarto †
- Mayor Abdullah †
- Kapten R.R. Andilolo †
- Kapten Soemitro †

Total Indonesian combat fatalities across all groups are recorded in the internal APRIS rekapitulasi korban document titled LBUM V: Ambon as approximately 2,645 killed and 43 missing. The figures were compiled by military command shortly after the campaign; however, their accuracy remains uncertain due to limited independent verification and the chaotic conditions of post-conflict reporting. Higher estimates have been cited in external sources.

Ambon and Seram were considered separate operations. No official casualty totals are available for the prolonged guerrilla conflict on Seram, which continued until 1963. However, informed estimates suggest Indonesian forces suffered between 600 and 1,300 additional fatalities during operations against RMS guerrilla fighters, with total casualties including wounded likely much higher.

Although the Republic of South Maluku (RMS) was largely supported by Ambonese and ex-KNIL elements, the Indonesian Armed Forces (APRIS) also deployed Ambonese personnel within its own ranks. Key figures included Mayor Pelupessy, commander of Batalyon Pelupessy, and Captain Josef Muskita, a former KNIL officer of Ambonese descent who joined the TNI in August 1950. Muskita later became a close associate of General Ahmad Yani and was considered one of the TNI’s most trusted Ambonese officers. Other influential Ambonese figures included Julius Tahija, a former KNIL officer who advised Muskita during the campaign, and Lieutenant Jacob Julius Sahulata, who later rose to the rank of general in the Korps Komando (Marines). These Ambonese soldiers were not only battle-hardened veterans of colonial military service, but also intimately familiar with the terrain, making them especially effective in operations across Ambon and Seram.

=== RMS Forces (APRMS) ===
The Armed Forces of the Republic of South Maluku (APRMS; Indonesian: Angkatan Perang Republik Maluku Selatan) consisted primarily of:

- Approximately 1,000 armed troops and local militia based in Ambon
- An estimated 4,000 RMS-aligned former KNIL personnel were stationed in other parts of Indonesia and did not directly participate in the fighting on Ambon. Following the defeat of RMS forces, many of these soldiers were relocated to the Netherlands under arrangements brokered with Dutch authorities. Historians note that the Netherlands, facing growing international pressure—particularly from the United States—to recognize Indonesian sovereignty, encouraged this resettlement. Initial promises that these Ambonese troops would eventually return to an independent South Moluccan state went unfulfilled.

The RMS was supported by former KNIL officers, many of whom had returned to Ambon after demobilization. The defense of Ambon centered around Fort Victoria and the surrounding highlands. Former KNIL soldiers from Ambon were known for their high discipline and extensive combat experience. They were trained in the Dutch military tradition and accustomed to strict command structures, giving RMS forces an early tactical advantage over Indonesian troops, many of whom came from irregular or newly formed units.

On 9 May 1950, the Republic of South Maluku formally established its military arm, the APRMS (Angkatan Perang Republik Maluku Selatan), appointing KNIL Sergeant Major D.J. Samson as its supreme commander. The APRMS adopted the KNIL-style rank structure, with many former KNIL soldiers forming the backbone of the force, supported by hundreds of armed local youth wielding spears and bows. The strength and discipline of APRMS made it one of the most formidable early internal rebellions faced by the Sukarno government. Its troops were often considered more battle-ready than the then-young TNI. By June 1950, a formal command structure had been established, with Samson as commander and Sergeant Major Pattiwael as chief of staff. The senior staff included Sergeant Majors Kastanja, Pieter, and Aipassa — all veteran KNIL soldiers who were given ranks ranging from colonel to major within the APRMS.

Most external sources suggest that approximately 500 personnel were killed during the main battle and occupation of Ambon, with additional but undocumented losses during the later guerrilla campaign on Seram. However, it is widely believed that only around 100 of these fatalities were from the core APRMS units—largely composed of former KNIL veterans—while the remaining 400 were youth militia armed primarily with traditional weapons such as spears and bows. The APRMS fighters were especially feared for their marksmanship; many had received sniper training under Dutch command and were considered highly disciplined and effective in defensive operations. Oral accounts from the Indonesian side later suggested that a single APRMS sniper could engage multiple targets with extreme efficiency, with one tale claiming that "eight TNI soldiers fell for every bullet fired." Despite their numerical disadvantage, these ex-KNIL sharpshooters inflicted disproportionate losses, contributing to the perception that the Ambon campaign was one of the most difficult internal operations ever faced by the early TNI.

== Aftermath ==
After the defeat of the RMS on Ambon by Indonesian forces in November 1950, the self-declared government withdrew to Seram, where an armed struggle continued on until December 1963. The government in exile moved to the Netherlands in 1966, following resistance leader and president Chris Soumokil's capture and execution by Indonesian authorities. The exiled government continues to exist, with John Wattilete as its incumbent president since April 2010.

== United Nations ==
The Proclamation of the RMS has been a subject on the agenda of the United Nations, but was displaced there by the Korean War. On October 1, the RMS government requested intervention from the UN Security Council, Australia and the Netherlands to invade Indonesian troops. The Netherlands indicated that this was a matter for the UN and referred to the RTC transfer.

== Legacy ==
The military engagements in Maluku prompted Kawilarang to establish what would later become Indonesia's special forces Kopassus.

Although crushed militarily, the RMS’s demands for self-government and its opposition to political and economic domination from Jakarta foreshadowed tensions that would erupt elsewhere in Eastern Indonesia. Many of the issues it raised, regional marginalisation, uneven development, nepotism, and lack of local autonomy, became central themes in the Permesta rebellion (1957–1961) in North Sulawesi and were also shared by the Revolutionary Government of the Republic of Indonesia (1958–1961). Similar grievances would later fuel other separatist movements across the archipelago, including the Free Papua Movement (OPM, 1965–present) in Western New Guinea and the Free Aceh Movement (GAM, 1976–2005) in Aceh. Ironically, some Indonesian military figures who had fought against the RMS later rebelled for similar reasons. Alexander Evert Kawilarang, then commander of the Territorial Army in Eastern Indonesia and a key figure in the RMS defeat, went on to become one of the leaders of the Permesta revolt.

== See also ==
- Makassar Uprising
- Operation Trikora
- Indonesia–Malaysia confrontation
- Maluku sectarian conflict
- Permesta
