= Indonesian Fascist Party =

Dutch East Indies (present day Indonesia) political party

Indonesian Fascist Party Partai Fasis Indonesia
- Abbreviation: PFI
- Founder: Notonindito
- Founded: 1933
- Ideology: Fascism; Javanisation; Javanese chauvinism Constitutional monarchism Confederalism
- Political position: Far-right

The Indonesian Fascist Party (Indonesian: Partai Fasis Indonesia, Dutch: Partij Fascist Indonesia or Indonesische Fascistische Partij, PFI) was a short-lived fascist political party founded in Bandung, Dutch East Indies in the summer of 1933 by a Javanese economist and politician named Notonindito. Although it did not last long and is poorly documented, it is often cited as an example of how European fascist ideas could manifest themselves in an Asian context, as well as appearing in conspiracy literature exaggerating its importance.

== History ==
Notonindito, the party's founder, was already well acquainted with Europeans and European society in the Indies in his youth through his membership in the Theosophical Society. In the early 1920s he had traveled to Europe to complete his education, first in The Hague and then in Berlin, where he finished a doctorate in Economics and Commerce. After his return to the Indies, he became involved in the Indonesian nationalist movement, at first in the Sarekat Islam Party in 1927 and then Sukarno's Indonesian National Party in 1929, eventually becoming its chairman in Pekalongan.

In the early 1930s in the Indies, the influence of fascism was being increasingly felt, with organizations such as the Netherlands Indies Fascist Organization (Dutch: Nederlandsch Indische Fascisten Organisatie, NIFO) and Fascisten Unie. These organizations appealed to expatriate Germans living in the Indies, as well as some Dutch and Indo (mixed race) people.

In the summer of 1933, newspapers in Java reported that Notonindito has broken his ties with the Indonesian National Party and founded his own party which he called the Partai Fasis Indonesia (Indonesian Fascist Party). The party was said to have as its goal an independent Java with a descendant of Sutawijaya (founder of the Mataram Sultanate) as its constitutional monarch. The party also wished the Indies to become a confederation of such independent kingdoms with a non-aggression pact with the Netherlands.

=== Reaction in the Indies ===
Reaction to the new party was generally quite negative in the Indies press. Newspaper, Sikap, thought that such a project was against the interests of the common Indonesian and that a twisting of Javanese historical figures into Fascist mythology was poorly considered, whereas the editors of Djawa Barat thought the party was counterproductive and harmful. Notonindito quickly denied to newspapers that he had "accepted the offer" of this party to become its leader.

The emergence of the PFI (Partai Fasis Indonesia) in the Indonesian Nationalist movement was met with resistance from other nationalist groups. For example, a newspaper associated with the Indonesian National Party, Menjala, stated that solutions to the Indies' problems should be found in the present, not in the Feudal past. The Indonesian National Party (PNI), Notonindito's former party, also opposed the PFI's ideology. In its daily publication, Menjala (Menyala), the PNI criticized the PFI, stating that "the Indonesian people do not move because they smell the smoke of the kemenjan, because they hear the sound of the ketoprak gamelan, because of the same red or green blood." The PNI emphasized that the Indonesian independence movement was not about reverting to feudalism or reactionary nationalism but was instead grounded in revolutionary populist nationalism, rejecting fascist principles. Criticism of the PFI appeared in the nationalist movement newspaper Harian Pemandangan, which dedicated a column and special coverage to the organization. The newspaper described the PFI as a continuation of the Javanese Nationalist Committee, an ethnonationalist organization led by Soetatmo Soerjokoesoemo in 1914. It characterized Javanese nationalism as "... a movement which is as old as Italy's Fascism." The paper further argued that Notonindito and the PFI represented a reimagining of the ideas of the Javanese Nationalist Committee. Despite this opposition, some leftist figures and groups, including Tan Malaka, Sutan Sjahrir, and even Mohammad Hatta, later accused the PNI and Sukarno of exhibiting fascistic tendencies in the post-independence period, which they saw as a threat to Indonesia's democracy.

Under constant pressure from critics, Notonindito quickly denied to newspapers that he had "accepted the offer" of this party to become its leader. Notonindito eventually announced his temporary withdrawal from politics, stating:

"For the time being, I am stepping back from the political stage."

However, this withdrawal became permanent, effectively marking the end of Notonindito's political career and the dissolution of the PFI as a political organization. Unlike the fascist movements in Italy and Germany under Mussolini and Hitler, the PFI did not have the opportunity to implement its political programs. Nonetheless, investigation by De Locomotief seemed to indicate that the party did indeed existed and that it had a few dozen members at that time. It is unclear what happened to the party soon after.

== See also ==
- List of political parties in Indonesia
- Fascism in Asia
- National Socialist Movement in the Dutch East Indies
