= SS Kota Inten =

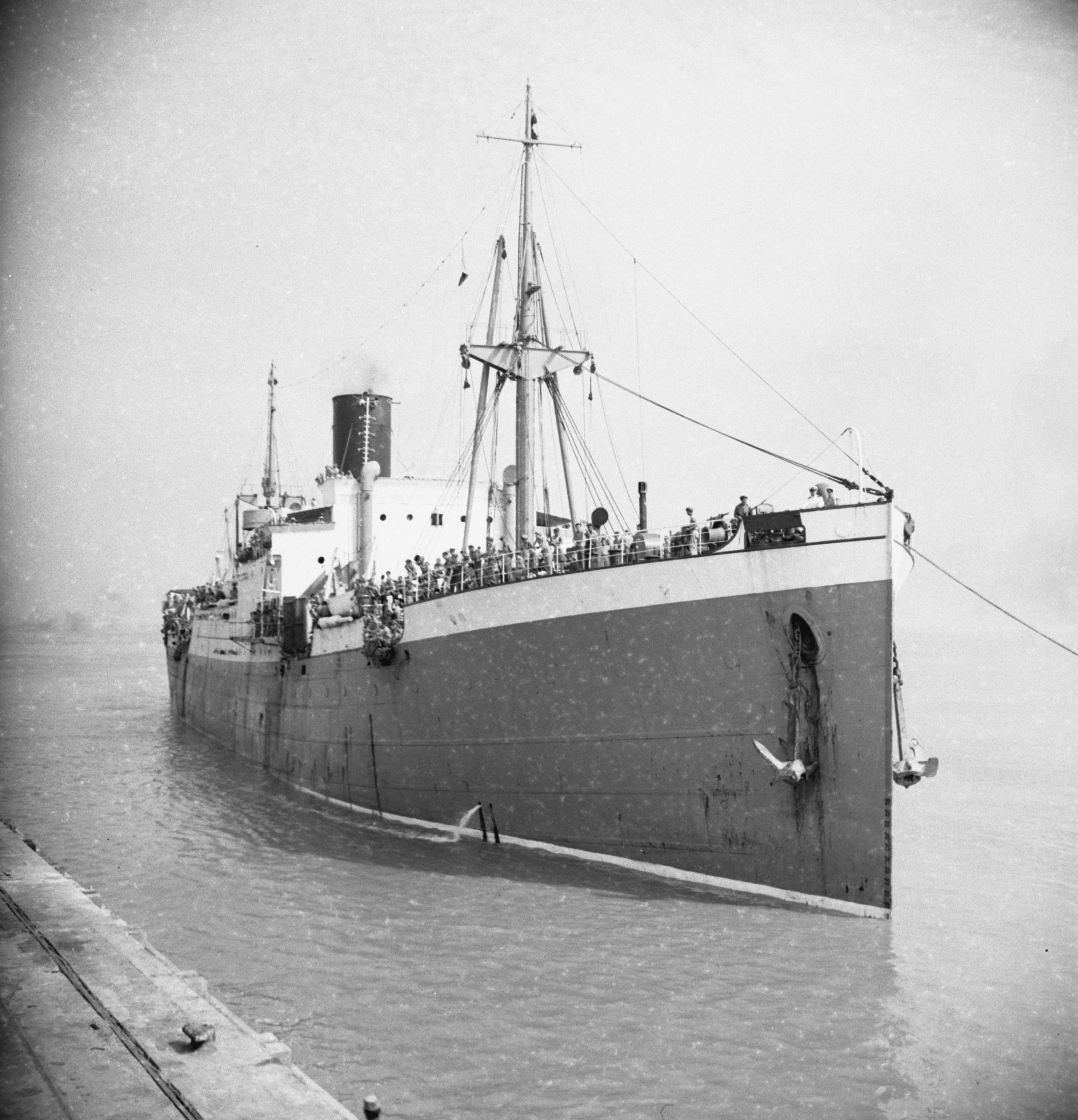
- The SS Kota Inten in 1947

History

Netherlands
- Name: Kota Inten
- Builder: Fijenoord
- Launched: 14 May 1927
- Completed: 25 October 1927
- Decommissioned: 1957
- In service: 1927–1957
- Refit: 1951 (converted to cargo only; reduced accommodation)
- Home port: Rotterdam
- Identification: Call sign: PHRS (later PFLQ)
- Fate: Scrapped in Hong Kong, 1957
- Notes: Operated by Royal Rotterdam Lloyd

General characteristics Technical characteristics
- Type: Cargo and passenger ship
- Tonnage: 7,211 GRT
- Length: 141.67 m LOA
- Beam: 18.54 m
- Depth: 9.04 m
- Decks: 3
- Installed power: 5,200 BHP diesel
- Propulsion: 1 × diesel engine, single screw
- Speed: 14 knots
- Notes: Originally 28 passengers; up to ~1,800 pilgrims with temporary decks

SS Kota Inten was a Dutch cargo and passenger ship operated by Royal Rotterdam Lloyd. Built in 1927, the vessel served in commercial, wartime, and post-war transport roles. It is best known for its role in the 1951 transportation of Ambonese (Moluccan) former KNIL soldiers and their families from Indonesia to the Netherlands, an event of lasting historical significance in Dutch migration history.

== Construction and early service ==
Kota Inten was built by the Fijenoord in Rotterdam and launched on 14 May 1927 for service with Rotterdamsche Lloyd, a major Dutch shipping line operating routes between Europe and Southeast Asia. The ship was designed primarily as a cargo vessel with accommodation for passengers, a common configuration for long-distance colonial routes in the interwar period.

== Second World War ==
During the Second World War, Kota Inten was requisitioned for military service and operated as a troop and cargo transport under Allied control. Following the war, the vessel was returned to Dutch service.

== Post-war transport and migration ==
In 1951, Kota Inten made multiple voyages transporting Ambonese soldiers of the former KNIL and their families from Indonesia to the Netherlands. These voyages formed part of a larger and politically sensitive post-colonial migration, following the dissolution of the KNIL after Indonesian independence.

The arrival of the Kota Inten and similar vessels is widely regarded as a defining moment in the formation of the Moluccan community in the Netherlands. Contemporary Dutch newspapers reported on the ship’s arrivals and the disembarkation of passengers at Rotterdam.

== Later years and fate ==
After completing its post-war transport duties, Kota Inten returned briefly to commercial service before being withdrawn. The ship was scrapped in 1957.

== Archival material ==
Photographs of Kota Inten are preserved in the collections of the Nationaal Archief in the Netherlands and the Canadian Museum of Immigration at Pier 21.

== See also ==
- Moluccan diaspora
- Royal Netherlands Navy
- Royal Rotterdam Lloyd
