= Raphael Supusepa =

Dutch footballer and coach (born 1978)

Personal information
- Date of birth: 13 August 1978 (age 48)
- Place of birth: Wormerveer, Netherlands
- Height: 1.77 m (5 ft 10 in)
- Position: Midfielder

Youth career
- 1983–1992: WFC Wormerveer
- 1992–1997: Ajax

Senior career*
Years	Team	Apps	(Gls)
1997–1999	Ajax	1	(0)
1999–2002	Excelsior	81	(3)
2002–2003	HFC Haarlem	32	(2)
2003–2004	Dordrecht	23	(3)
2004–2007	MVV	77	(0)
2007–2008	Quick Boys		
2008–2009	IJsselmeervogels		
2009–2014	Lisse		
- RKVV Saenden

International career
1995	Netherlands U18	3	(1)

Managerial career
- 2025: Shaanxi Union (assistant)
- * Club domestic league appearances and goals

Raphael Supusepa (born 13 August 1978) is a Dutch former professional footballer and coach. A midfielder, he came through the youth academy of Ajax and made one Eredivisie appearance for the club during their 1997–98 title-winning season, before spending the core of his professional career in the Eerste Divisie with Excelsior, HFC Haarlem, Dordrecht and MVV. He subsequently played for several amateur clubs in the Zaanstreek and South Holland before transitioning into coaching, serving as a youth coach at Beijing Guoan in the Chinese Super League and later as head coach and head of youth development at Fortuna Wormerveer in his hometown.

== Early life ==
Supusepa was born on 13 August 1978 in Wormerveer, a town in the Zaanstreek region of North Holland. His father is of Moluccan descent, originating from the Maluku Islands in Indonesia. He began playing football at the age of five with his local club WFC, the precursor to Fortuna Wormerveer. At the age of fourteen he joined the youth academy of Ajax in Amsterdam.

== Club career ==
=== Ajax (1997–1999) ===
After progressing through Ajax's youth ranks, Supusepa was promoted to the first-team squad in the summer of 1997, signing his first professional contract alongside Tim de Cler, Richard Knopper and Andy van der Meyde. His sole appearance came on 14 March 1998, when he came on as a second-half substitute for Danny Blind in a 6–1 Eredivisie home win over Volendam under manager Morten Olsen. Ajax went on to win the Eredivisie and KNVB Cup double that season. Supusepa remained at the club for a further year without adding to his tally of appearances, and left for Excelsior in the summer of 1999.

=== Eerste Divisie years (1999–2007) ===
Supusepa spent three seasons at Excelsior (1999–2002), making 81 appearances and scoring three goals in the Eerste Divisie. He then joined HFC Haarlem for the 2002–03 season, registering 32 appearances and two goals before moving to Dordrecht the following year, where he scored three times in 23 appearances.

In the summer of 2004, Supusepa joined MVV Maastricht, where he spent three seasons and made 77 appearances without scoring. He departed upon the expiry of his contract in 2007.

=== Later playing career ===
After leaving professional football, Supusepa played for several lower-division clubs in the Netherlands. He spent a season with Quick Boys in Katwijk (2007–08), followed by stints with IJsselmeervogels and FC Lisse, before finishing his playing career at RKVV Saenden in the Zaanstreek.

== International career ==
Supusepa represented the Netherlands under-18 side in September 1995 during a four-nation youth tournament under head coach Rinus Israël. He started all three matches, making his debut in a 2–1 victory over Denmark on 19 September, in which he scored the winning goal. This was followed by a 4–2 win over Scotland two days later and a 1–1 draw against Belgium on 23 September.

== Coaching career ==
In 2018, Supusepa moved to China to join the coaching staff of Beijing Sinobo Guoan in the Chinese Super League, a role he held for approximately six years. During this period he also operated a football school, ZaanPro, in the Zaanstreek region.

Following his return to the Netherlands in 2024, Supusepa was appointed head coach of Fortuna Wormerveer—the club where he had begun his career as a child—signing a two-year contract. He simultaneously took on the role of head of youth development, making the position full-time. He left before completing his contract, departing in June 2025 to become assistant coach at Shaanxi Union in China under head coach Giovanni Franken.

== Personal life ==
Supusepa is the eldest of three brothers, all of whom have been active in Dutch football. His brothers Christian and Stephan are also former footballers.
