= Notonindito =

Javanese accountant, intellectual and politician

Raden Pandji Wirasmo Notonindito (born 1900), often referred to as Dr. Notonindito, was a Javanese accountant, intellectual and politician in the Dutch East Indies. He founded the short-lived Indonesian Fascist Party in 1933.

== Biography ==
=== Early life ===
Notonindito was born into an elite family in Rembang, Central Java, Dutch East Indies, apparently in 1900. He was son of a nobleman named Raden Pandji Notomidjojo; among his brothers were Raden Pandji Notosoebagio, future judge and father of Haryati Soebadio, Suharto-era minister, and Raden Pandji Pawitrohadinoto, who would become vice-chair of the Landraad in the 1920s. In 1918 he graduated from the MULO school, then continued his education at the Telefoon Cursus in Weltevreden (now part of Jakarta). He became interested in Theosophy and became a member of the Theosophical Society. In the autumn of 1921 he sailed to Rotterdam to continue his studies in Europe. He was among a new generation of Indonesian students who had been born around the turn of the century and who studied European accounting and economics. He made his way to The Hague first, studying business communication, and then to Berlin, taking a doctorate in Economics and Commerce there, graduating in 1924 with a thesis about business in Java. After that he returned to the Indies, settling in Pekalongan and became an accountant.

=== Colonial era career and politics ===
In Pekalongan, Notonindito soon involved himself in politics and cultural affairs. He was offered the role as chairman of the local branch of Boedi Oetomo, a Javanese cultural organization, in 1926, although he declined. He became co-editor of a new biweekly Indonesian language journal, Pelita Indonesia, alongside a fellow accountant named Alimana. He became the only Indonesian member of the local government's finance committee in Pekalongan. For a time he involved himself in the Sarekat Islam Party, a successor organization to the once-influential Sarekat Islam. It was during the 1927 congress of that party that Notonindito was nominated to lead a new Chamber of commerce for Indonesians in Pekalongan. This new organization, organized as an affiliate of the Sarekat Islam Party, would eventually be called the Perhimpoenan Dagang Indonesia (Indonesian: Indonesian trade assembly), known in Dutch as the Indonesische Handelsvereeniging Pekalongan.

In early 1927 his family was struck by two losses, as his father died, and his brother Raden Pandji Pawitrohadinoto, the vice-chairman of the Landraad (colonial parliament), was assassinated by gunshot.

In May 1928 he resigned from the Pekalongan local council, but by the early 1930s he had apparently returned to it. In 1929 he also apparently joined Sukarno's Indonesian National Party, and eventually became its chairman in Pekalongan.

In the early 1930s Notonindito relocated from Pekalongan to Bandung. There he became a member of the city finance council and also sat on the council of Bandung Regency.

=== Indonesian Fascist Party ===
In the summer of 1933, newspapers in Java reported that Notonindito had broken with the Indonesian National Party and founded his own party which he called the Partai Fasis Indonesia (Indonesian Fascist Party). The party was said to have as its goal an independent Java with a descendant of Sutawijaya (founder of the Mataram Sultanate) as its constitutional monarch. The party also wished the Indies to become a confederation of such independent kingdoms with a non-aggression pact with the Netherlands. Reaction to the new party was generally quite negative in the Indies press. For example, a newspaper associated with the Indonesian National Party, Menjala, stated that solutions to the Indies' problems should be found in the present, not in the Feudal past. Sikap, likewise, thought that such a project was against the interests of the common Indonesian and that a twisting of Javanese historical figures into Fascist mythology was poorly considered, whereas the editors of Djawa Barat thought the party was counterproductive and harmful. Notonindito quickly denied to newspapers that he had "accepted the offer" of this party to become its leader. Nonetheless, investigation by De Locomotief seemed to indicate that the part did indeed exist and that it had a few dozen members at that time. It is unclear what happened with the party after that.

After the episode with the Indonesian Fascist Party, he also became increasingly interested in Japanese presence in the Indies. He became co-chair of a local organization in Bandung called the Japanese-Indonese-Institute.

=== Independent Indonesia ===
After Indonesia declared independence in 1945, Notonindito continued to involve himself in politics and education. He published one of the first Economics textbooks in Indonesian in Bandung in 1946. During the Indonesian National Revolution he became associated with future foreign minister Soenario, working as economic advisor to his business (the Soenario-Concern) and working together as commissioners for the Indonesia Advisory Body (Indonesian: Badan Penasehat Indonesia).

In 1952 he became involved in the Indonesian Chartered Accountants' Society (Indonesian: Perserikatan Accountant Indonesia Beridiazah). In 1955 he, along with a Dr. Cochrane and an accountant named Challik aimed to found a new national Economic academy in Bandung.
