= Didi Taihuttu =

Dutch entrepreneur (born 1978)

Didi Taihuttu (born in Venlo on 26 May 1978) is a Dutch entrepreneur, traveler, author, writer and public speaker, mainly known for living entirely off Bitcoin cryptocurrency.

Taihuttu became well known for the fact that he and his family sold all their belongings in 2017 to live a fully bankless existence using solely BTC bitcoin. The family has become known as 'the bitcoin family'. He appeared in the TV shows Gert Late Night, De Wereld Draait Door, Jinek and Pauw. Documentaries about him were published by Arte, CNBC, The Wall Street Journal, videoland, streamz and CNA. The family went living in Portugal because of the very positive tax rules on cryptocurrency.

== Biography ==
Didi Taihuttu is the son of the professional football player of VVV-Venlo John Taihuttu. Taihuttu has Dutch and Moluccans descent, and grew up in a Moluccan family. He studied Higher Economic Education at the Fontys Hogeschool in Venlo, after which he started his career in the Swiss Zug. After a number of short-term jobs, he chose to start his own computer training company at the age of 24 and has been working as an entrepreneur ever since.

== Bibliography ==
- 2018: Didi & The Bitcoin Family ISBN 978-90-828375-1-3
- 2019: Die Bitcoin Familie: Wie Mut uns zum Glück führte (to ₿ or not to ₿) ISBN 978-1-7001-4554-3

== Documentaries ==
- 2017: CNBC
- 2017: Y-Kollektiv – Bitcoin: Blase oder digitales gold? Der Hype um die Kryptowährung
- 2018: Arte.tv
- 2018: The Wall Street Journal
- 2018: CNA
- 2021: VIDEOLAND – Cryptokoorts
- 2022: STREAMZ – Is Crypto het nieuwe goud
