= Maluku Sovereignty Front =

Indonesian secessionist movement

- Front Kedaulatan Maluku
- Emblem of Maluku Sovereignty Front Representative in the US
- Other name: Front for the Sovereignty of the Moluccas
- Leader: Alex Manuputty
- Active regions: Maluku Islands
- Ideology: Moluccan nationalism Liberal conservatism Anti-communism

The Maluku Sovereignty Front (Indonesian: Front Kedaulatan Maluku, FKM) is a secessionist movement on Ambon Island, aiming to restore the Republic of the South Moluccas (RMS). It was established on 15 June 2000 at Ambon.

They have been monitored by the Indonesian military for stockpiling weapons and other activities. Indonesian sources claim that the group first emerged in January 1999.

One of their activities has been to fly the banned flag of the Republic of South Maluku in public places to commemorate an unsuccessful secession attempt in 1950.

The leader of the FKM organisation Alex Manuputty has fled to the United States, but continues to support independence.

In 2025, a Maluku police report suspected that FKM might still exist, later holding joint patrols in anticipation for separatist activity on 25 April. Though nothing came about.

== See also ==
- Separatism in Indonesia
- Invasion of Ambon
- Republic of South Maluku
