= Chris Manusama =

Personal details
- Born: Chris Manuel Manusama; December 25, 1952 (age 73) Subang, West Java, Indonesia.
- Spouse: Yoty Henny Rumahlewang-Manusama
- Occupation: Minister; Speaker

Chris Manuel Manusama (born December 25, 1952) is the lead pastor of GBI ROCK Church, Ambon, a Charismatic church under the denomination of GBI (Gereja Bethel Indonesia), with 4,000 members.

== Early life ==
Born into an underprivileged military family, Manusama spent most of his childhood in Ambon, Maluku, East Indonesia and Bandung, West Java, Indonesia. At the age of 9, he lost his father Yan Manusama, who drowned in a Halmaheran river during the Permesta War. Eight years later, Manusama also lost his mother, Yohanna Manusama, due to her chronic illness. During his childhood, Manusama was known to be involved in various different music groups where he played guitar, sang, and wrote songs.

== Career ==
In 1978, Manusama won a song writing competition by Prambors Radio with his most famous song to date, Kidung (sung by Chrisye on YouTube, which also made it to Rolling Stone Indonesia's Top 150 Songs of All Time. His popularity escalated ever since, with a few other well-known songs such as Kasih (sung by Imaniar) topping the charts. In the early 80s, Manusama also helped Indonesian singer Herman Felani with the production of Felani's album titled, Syukur.

Manusama decided to leave the "secular" music industry after converting to Christianity. In 1985, he dedicated his life to ministry through preaching and pastoring.
