= Johanis Manuhutu =

South Moluccas politician (1908–1984)

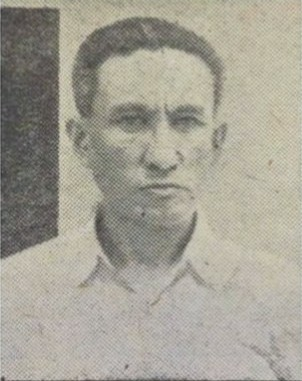
- Manuhutu c. 1955

1st President of Republic of South Maluku
- In office 25 April 1950 – 3 May 1950
- Prime Minister: Albert Wairisal
- Preceded by: Position established
- Succeeded by: Christiaan Robbert Steven Soumokil

Personal details
- Born: April 9, 1908 Haria, Saparua, Maluku, Dutch East Indies
- Died: August 22, 1984 (aged 76) Haria, Saparua, Central Maluku Regency, Maluku, Indonesia

Johanis Hermanus Manuhutu (9 April 1908 in Haria, Saparua – 22 August 1984 in Haria, Saparua) was a South Moluccan civil servant in the Dutch East Indies and the first president of the Republic of South Maluku (or South Moluccas) in 1950.

== Biography ==
Manuhutu completed his initial education at Meer Uitgebreid Lager Onderwijs in Ambon Island and then studied at the Education School for Native Civil Servants (OSVIA) in Makassar. Starting 1929 he worked at the Inland Government Service in Ambon. Later he was transferred to Java where he suffered Japanese occupation during the World War II.

After that war he was, among other things, head of the South Moluccas Daïra (province) of the (federal) State of East Indonesia during the time of the United States of Indonesia. In response to the attempts of centralization by the government in Jakarta, the initiative was taken to withdraw the Daïra of South Moluccas from the federation. On April 25, 1950, at the initiative of Chris Soumokil and Johan Manusama, the independent Republic of South Moluccas (in Indonesian, Republik Maluku Selatan) was proclaimed by a declaration signed by Johanis Manuhutu and Albert Wairisal. Manuhutu was appointed as president and Waisiral became prime minister. On May 3, 1950, Chris Soumokil succeeded him as president.

In early 1952, Manuhutu was captured by the Indonesian army in an operation on Seram Island, and was sentenced to five years in prison. He stated that he had issued the proclamation under heavy pressure from the military at the time. In August 1955, he was pardoned and thus effectively released after three and a half years of imprisonment. Later he went to live near Jakarta with his wife and brother, where he worked for a shipping company. He reconciled with the Indonesian authorities and in 1970 he may have been involved in discussions about the possible return of Ambonese people from the Netherlands.

Manuhutu was married and had seven children.
