= Wormerveer =

- Town
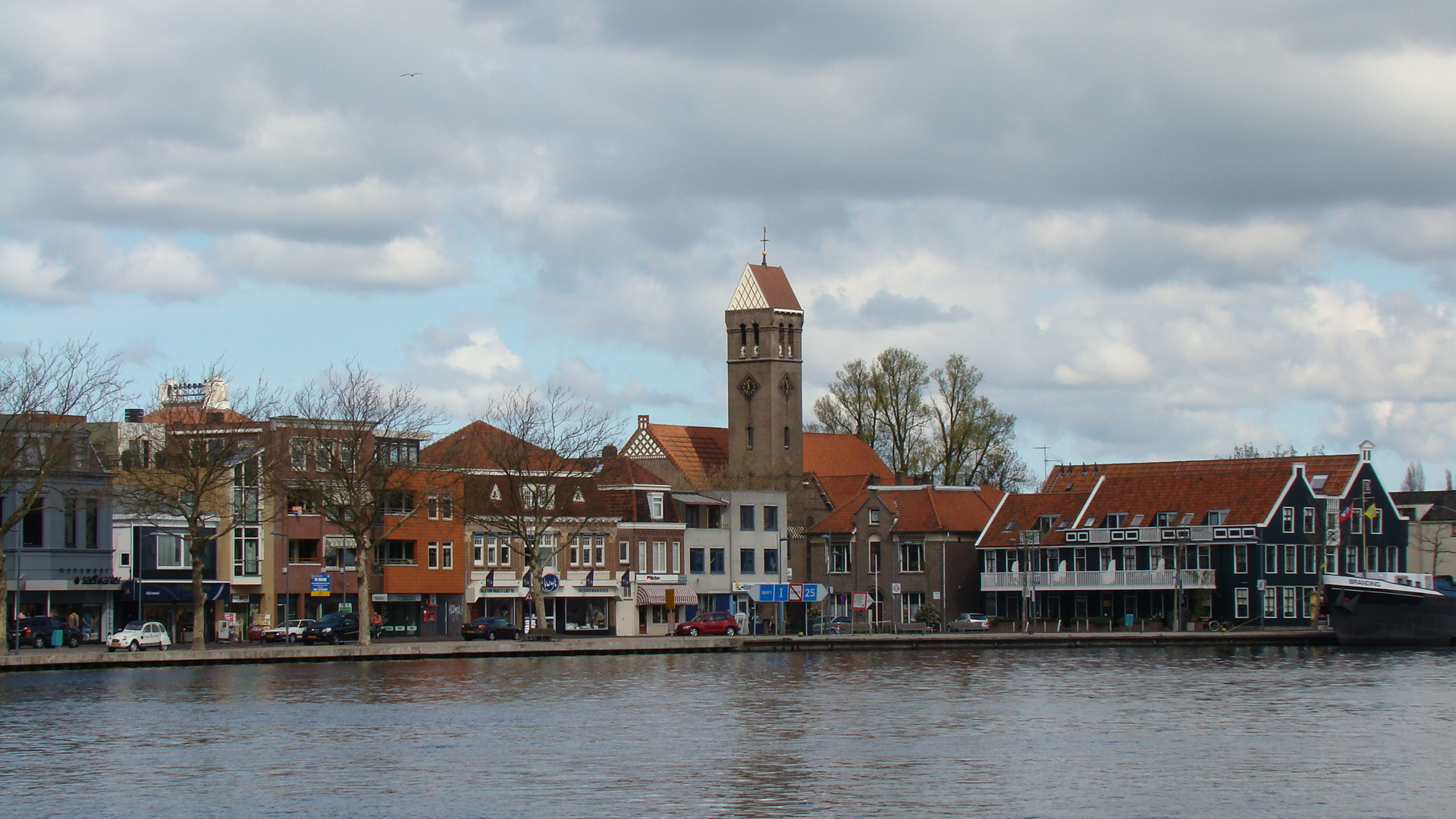
- Wormerveer

- Flag Coat of arms

- Location in the Netherlands Location in the province of North Holland in the Netherlands
- Coordinates: 52°29′N 4°47′E
- Country: Netherlands
- Province: North Holland
- Municipality: Zaanstad

Area
  - Total: 6.36 km^{2} (2.46 sq mi)
- Elevation: −0.3 m (−0.98 ft)

Population (2021)
  - Total: 11,990
  - Density: 1,890/km^{2} (4,880/sq mi)
- Time zone: UTC+1 (CET)
  - Summer (DST): UTC+2 (CEST)
- Postal code: 1521
- Dialing code: 075

Wormerveer is a town in the Dutch province of North Holland. It is a part of the municipality of Zaanstad, and lies about 13 km (8 miles) northwest of Amsterdam.

Wormerveer developed in the 15th century on the west bank of the Zaan river. It started to industrialise with windmills in the 17th century, however none of the windmills exist any more. The Dutch Reformed church was built in 1639 to replace the medieval church which was destroyed in 1574 by Spanish troops.

Wormerveer was a separate municipality until 1974, when it became a part of the new municipality of Zaanstad.

== Transport ==
- Railway station Wormerveer

There are 4 trains per hour from Monday to Friday to Amsterdam.

2 trains per hour operate on Saturdays and Sundays.

== Notable people ==
- Herman Gorter
- Wolter Kroes
- Gerrit Mannoury
- Christian Supusepa
- Raphael Supusepa
