= John Wattilete =

President of the Republic of South Maluku (born 1954)

President of the Republic of South Maluku
- Incumbent
- Assumed office 17 April 2010
- Preceded by: Frans Tutuhatunewa

Prime minister and vice-president of the Republic of South Maluku
- In office April 2003 – c. April 2010
- President: Frans Tutuhatunewa
- Preceded by: Pieter Thenu

Personal details
- Born: 1954 (age 71–72) Bemmel, Netherlands
- Education: LL.M., Radboud University
- Occupation: Lawyer

Gerardus Johannes "John" Wattilete (born 1954) is the president of the Republic of South Maluku's government-in-exile in the Netherlands, where he also practices law.

== Personal life ==
Gerardus Johannes Wattilete was born in 1954 in Bemmel, Netherlands, to a South Moluccan father and a Dutch mother. In 1983, he graduated from Radboud University Nijmegen with a Master of Laws, and was working as a lawyer in Amsterdam in 2016.

== Career ==
In 1995, Wattilete was appointed as a minister in the cabinet of the Republic of South Maluku's government-in-exile. In 1999, he twice traveled to Indonesia and met with the presidents, B. J. Habibie and Abdurrahman Wahid.

In April 2003, Wattilete became the Republic of South Maluku's prime minister and vice president, replacing Pieter Thenu in those offices.

=== Presidency ===
On 17 April 2010, Wattilete was sworn in as president of the Republic of South Maluku, replacing Frans Tutuhatunewa, and becoming the nation's first Dutch-born president.

In October 2010, he filed a lawsuit in The Hague, asking the court to arrest the president of Indonesia, Susilo Bambang Yudhoyono, upon his impending visit to the Netherlands; Yudhoyono cancelled his trip in response. In 2016 when a new Indonesian president, Joko Widodo, was scheduled to visit the Netherlands, Wattilete did not plan to file suit, saying that Widodo instead had the goodwill to solve the Maluku issue.
