= Ferdinand Katipana =

Dutch footballer

Personal information
- Full name: Ferdinand Katipana
- Date of birth: 19 September 1980 (age 46)
- Place of birth: Amersfoort, Netherlands
- Height: 1.68 m (5 ft 6 in)
- Position: Midfielder

Team information
- Current team: DOVO

Youth career
- 1998–2001: Jong Ajax
- 2001–2002: FC Utrecht

Senior career*
Years	Team	Apps	(Gls)
2002–2003	SC Cambuur	26	(7)
2003–2006	HFC Haarlem	81	(3)
2006–2008	SC Cambuur	47	(2)
2008–2013	IJsselmeervogels	57	(4)
2013–2014	FC Lienden	11	(0)
2014–	DOVO	0	(0)
- * Club domestic league appearances and goals

Ferdinand Katipana (born 19 September 1980) is a Dutch footballer who plays as a midfielder for DOVO in the Dutch Hoofdklasse.

== Career ==
Born in Amersfoort, Katipana played with the youth teams of a number of Dutch clubs, including Jong Ajax and FC Utrecht. He played professionally between 2002 and 2008 for SC Cambuur and HFC Haarlem, scoring 12 goals in 154 appearances. He moved to current club IJsselmeervogels in 2008.
