= Justin Tahapary =

Dutch professional footballer

Personal information
- Date of birth: 23 May 1985 (age 41)
- Place of birth: Den Bosch, Netherlands
- Height: 1.67 m (5 ft 6 in)
- Position: Right back

Youth career
- Wilhelmina Maaspoort
- 1996–2003: Willem II

Senior career*
Years	Team	Apps	(Gls)
2004–2012	FC Eindhoven	213	(1)
2012–2015	FC Den Bosch	48	(0)
- VV Gestel
- Real Lunet
Total		261	(1)
- * Club domestic league appearances and goals

Justin Tahapary (born 23 May 1985) is a Dutch former professional footballer who played as a right back for FC Eindhoven and FC Den Bosch.

== Early and personal life ==
Born in Den Bosch, his two daughters also played football, one with PSV and one with BLC. He also has a son.

== Career ==
After playing youth football with Wilhelmina Maaspoort and Willem II, Tahapary played professionally for FC Eindhoven and FC Den Bosch, making 261 appearances in the Eerste Divisie. At Eindhoven he served as captain.

He retired from professional football aged 30 following injuries, and then played amateur football with VV Gestel and Real Lunet. He also worked with a youth advisory organisation.
