= Frans Tutuhatunewa =

Indonesian politician

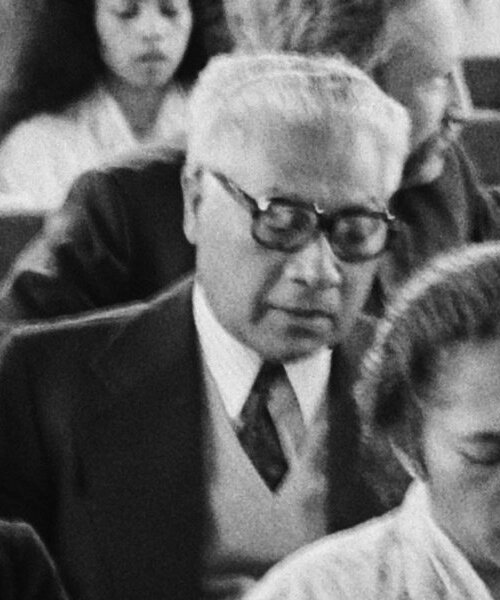
- Tutuhatunewa in 1975

President of South Maluku (in exile)
- In office 1993–2010
- Preceded by: Johan Manusama
- Succeeded by: John Wattilete

Personal details
- Born: 26 June 1923 Batavia, Dutch East Indies
- Died: 22 October 2016 (aged 93) Breda, Netherlands

Frans Lodewijk Johannis Tutuhatunewa (26 June 1923 – 22 October 2016) was the fourth president in exile of the Republic of the South Moluccas between 1993 and 2010. He was born in Batavia, Dutch East Indies. He was preceded by Johan Manusama and succeeded by John Wattilete in 2010.
