= Carolyn Lilipaly =

Dutch news anchor and actress

Carolijn "Carolyn" Lilipaly is a Dutch news anchor and actress.

== Early life and education ==
Dutch-Moluccan Carolijn Lilipaly was born in Middelburg. Her father was former Dutch Labour Party parliament member John Lilipaly (1943-2022).

She studied law.

== Career ==
Lilipaly became a presenter for MTV Europe in London. Carolyn was the host of MTV Hit List UK, MTV News at Night and The Big Picture. At this time she adopted the name Carolyn so it would be easier pronounced by English speakers. In the five years that she worked for MTV she travelled around the world and interviewed a host of international stars from the world of music and film. Later on she worked as a presenter for CNBC Europe, Net5, and Canal Plus.

Lilipaly was a news anchor for the Dutch morning news program NOS Journaal from January 2003 through February 2004. High points in her time at NOS included the presentation of a special Journal about the arrest of Saddam Hussein. In the beginning of 2004 she left the NOS and worked for Omroep Zeeland television, where she presented the news.

She acted in the 1999 movie The Delivery.
