= John Taihuttu =

Dutch footballer (1954–2016)

Personal information
- Date of birth: 18 November 1954
- Place of birth: Venlo, Netherlands
- Date of death: 17 January 2016 (aged 61)
- Place of death: Netherlands
- Position: Winger

Youth career
- VCH
- SV Blerick
- –1972: Quick Boys '31

Senior career*
Years	Team	Apps	(Gls)
1981–1986	FC VVV	115	(36)
1985	→ Fortuna SC (loan)	6	(0)
Total		121	(36)
- * Club domestic league appearances and goals

John Taihuttu (18 November 1954 – 17 January 2016) was a Dutch professional footballer.

== Club career ==
A pacy winger, Taihuttu spent his professional football career at FC VVV, except for a half season loan spell at Fortuna Sittard in 1985. Dutch football commentator Theo Koomen famously nicknamed him Winnetou after a speedy run by the long haired forward resembled him of the historic Indian chief.

By the time of his death, Taihuttu was 19th on VVV's all-time top goalscorers list with 36.

== Personal life and death ==
His younger brother Jerry Taihuttu and his son Gino also played professionally.

Taihuttu later became youth coach at Fortuna and coached SV Blerick until his death. He died of cancer in January 2016.
