= Republic of South Maluku =

Secessionist state in Indonesia (1950–1963)

Coordinates: 3°37′S 128°06′E

Republic of South Maluku Republik Maluku Selatan (Indonesian) Republiek der Zuid-Molukken (Dutch)
- 1950–1963; 1966–present: Government-in-exile
- Flag Coat of arms
- Motto: Mena-Muria (Ambonese Malay) "One for all, all for one"^{[a]}
- Anthem: Maluku, Tanah Airku (Malay) "Maluku, My Homeland"
- Peak territory controlled by the Republic of South Maluku in April 1950
- Status: Unrecognized state; government in exile after 1966
- Capital: Ambon
- Common languages: Ambonese; Dutch^{[b]}; Indonesian
- Religion: Christianity (Majority) Islam (Minority)
- Government: Republic under a provisional government
- President^{[c]}
  - 1950: Johanis Manuhutu
  - 1950–1966: Chris Soumokil
  - 1966–1992: Johan Manusama
  - 1993–2010: Frans Tutuhatunewa
  - 2010–present: John Wattilete
- Historical era: Post-colonial
  - Established: 25 April 1950
  - Disestablished: 2 December 1963
  - Exile: 12 April 1966
- ^a Mena-Muria can be translated variously. The phrase literally means "Front-Back" or "Onward-Backward", but it is often interpreted as "To lead, to follow", "I go, you follow", and "One for all, all for one".; ^b Due to the government-in-exile's location.; ^c In exile in the Netherlands since 1966.

The Republic of South Maluku (Indonesian: Republik Maluku Selatan), also known as the Republic of the South Moluccas (Dutch: Republiek der Zuid-Molukken), was an unrecognised Indonesian secessionist movement that claimed the islands of Ambon, Buru, and Seram, which currently make up most of the province of Maluku.

The Dutch conquest exerted colonial control across the archipelago in the 19th century, establishing a unitary administration. The borders of present-day Indonesia were formed through colonial expansion finalised in the 20th century. After the occupation by the Japanese Empire during World War II ended in 1945, nationalist leaders on Java unilaterally declared Indonesian independence. Early organised indigenous resistance came from the South Moluccas with support and aid from the Dutch government and military. The South Moluccan rebels initially clung on to an early post-colonial treaty prescribing a federal form of statehood. When that treaty, agreed between the Dutch government and the Indonesian government in December 1949, was broken, they unilaterally declared a fully independent Republic of South Maluku (RMS) in April 1950. The South Moluccan leaders based their decision on the treaty, which stipulated autonomy for each of the states of the federation.

After the defeat of the RMS on Ambon by Indonesian forces in November 1950, the self-declared government withdrew to Seram, where an armed struggle continued on until 2 December 1963. The government-in-exile moved to the Netherlands in 1966, following resistance leader and president Chris Soumokil's capture and execution by Indonesian authorities. The exiled government has continued to claim the existence of the Republic of South Maluku, with John Wattilete as its incumbent president since April 2010. However, unlike the Free Papua Movement, the group has never carried acts of violence against the Indonesian government in the present day. The Republic of South Maluku has been a member state within the Unrepresented Nations and Peoples Organization (UNPO) since 1991.

== History ==
=== Original settlers ===
The original settlers of the Moluccan Islands were similar to neighbouring regions like West Papua, East Nusa Tengarra and East Timor. They were ancestors of the Aboriginal Australians, then the ancestors of the Papuans, and lastly the Austronesian settlers from the Philippines by way of Taiwan. Like the rest of what is now Indonesia, the first settlers were Australoid. Today many Maluku tribes still are ethnically Melanesian and closely represent the original settlers, most of these are what can be considered highlander communities that live in the mountain areas. In contrast, much of the coastal areas have seen a change in the make-up of the population since the original inhabitants have often mixed with the later influx of Austronesian migrations – ultimately causing modern day Moluccans to have a varying degree of Melanesian paternal and Austronesian maternal ancestry. It is widely considered that this area was the place of origin for the Polynesian expansion, and the genetic makeup of the people, cultural and linguistic background, alongside their outrigger canoe (catamaran and trimaran) technology, only further support this.

=== European conquest of the South Moluccas ===
The Maluku Islands were the only place in the world that grew the prized spices of clove and nutmeg, making it a prime destination for European traders during the Age of Exploration. At one point, cloves were worth their weight in gold, and Portuguese, Spanish, British and Dutch traders all fought to control the incredibly profitable spice trade monopoly. Eventually, the traders of the Dutch East Indies Company (VOC) emerged as the dominant merchant power in Maluku. Through an effective combination of force and diplomacy, the VOC achieved a structure of indirect rule in northern Maluku and direct rule in southern Maluku.

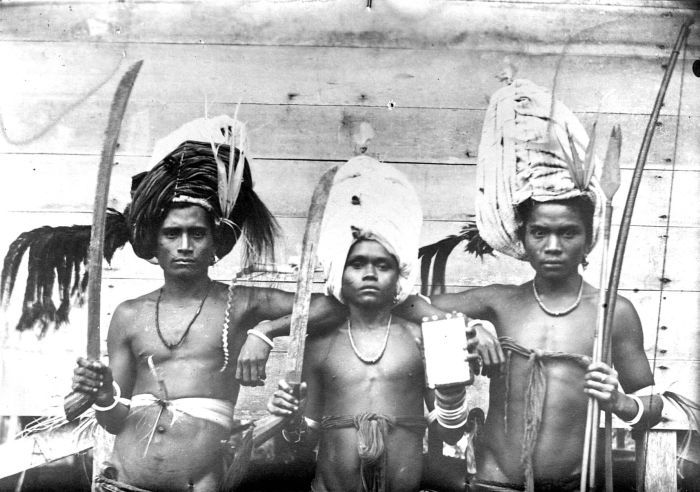
South Moluccan warriors from Tanimbar

Throughout much of the VOC era (17th and 18th centuries), the south Moluccans resisted Dutch dominance. The Banda Islands were only subdued after the indigenous power structure and organisation of trade and politics was destroyed with the extermination and eviction of the Bandanese population in 1621. To repress the autonomous traders of East Seram, the VOC organised 'Hongi' raiding expeditions with warrior bands from other south Maluku islands. During 'Hongi' raids, houses and vessels were burnt, cash crops were uprooted and most wealth was looted by the 'Hongi' warriors. Survivors who escaped had to start from scratch and, during two centuries of resistance, the East Seramese increasingly suffered impoverishment. However, their independent trading network was never completely destroyed.

From 1780 to 1802, the people of Seram joined an alliance of North Moluccan, Papuan and British forces in a combined revolt. Resistance leader prince Nuku (the exiled Sultan of Tidore) established himself on Seram and aimed at uniting the North and South Moluccas under his leadership. His raiders targeted South Moluccan islands under the Dutch sphere of influence. When the British left the arena in 1802 his plans were foiled and the Dutch restored their dominance.

Maluku islanders staged various rebellions during the Dutch colonisation of the Indonesian archipelago in the 19th century following the collapse of the VOC. In a famous revolt on the south Maluku island Saparua, the Dutch fort was taken by the rebel leader Pattimura, a former sergeant in the army of Britain, who had ruled the islands for a short time before returning them to the Dutch in 1816. After reinforcements were sent from the colonial capital Batavia, the insurgents were captured and Pattimura was executed in 1817.

During the independence movement of Indonesia, Indonesian republicans included South Maluku as part of the independent Indonesia they declared in 1945. Indonesia's struggle to secure its independence lasted from 1945 until 1949. After international pressure, the Dutch acknowledged a federal Indonesian republic on 27 December 1949. In the first instance, the Netherlands only acknowledged the independence of Indonesia as a federation of autonomous states, of which one was East Indonesia (including South Maluku).

On 25 April 1950, demobilised ex-Royal Dutch East Indies Army (KNIL) soldiers and other South Moluccan men who remained loyal to the Dutch crown, staged a revolt and proclaimed an independent "Republic of South Maluku" (Indonesian: Republik Maluku Selatan). On 17 August 1950, the Indonesian president, Sukarno, proclaimed the restoration of the unitary state of the Republic of Indonesia. Indonesia's liberal democratic system of government, whereby the cabinet would be accountable to the House of Representatives, was retained. This was a source of political instability in the young republic, with frequent changes in government until the rise of the New Order.

=== South Moluccan career soldiers of the colonial army ===
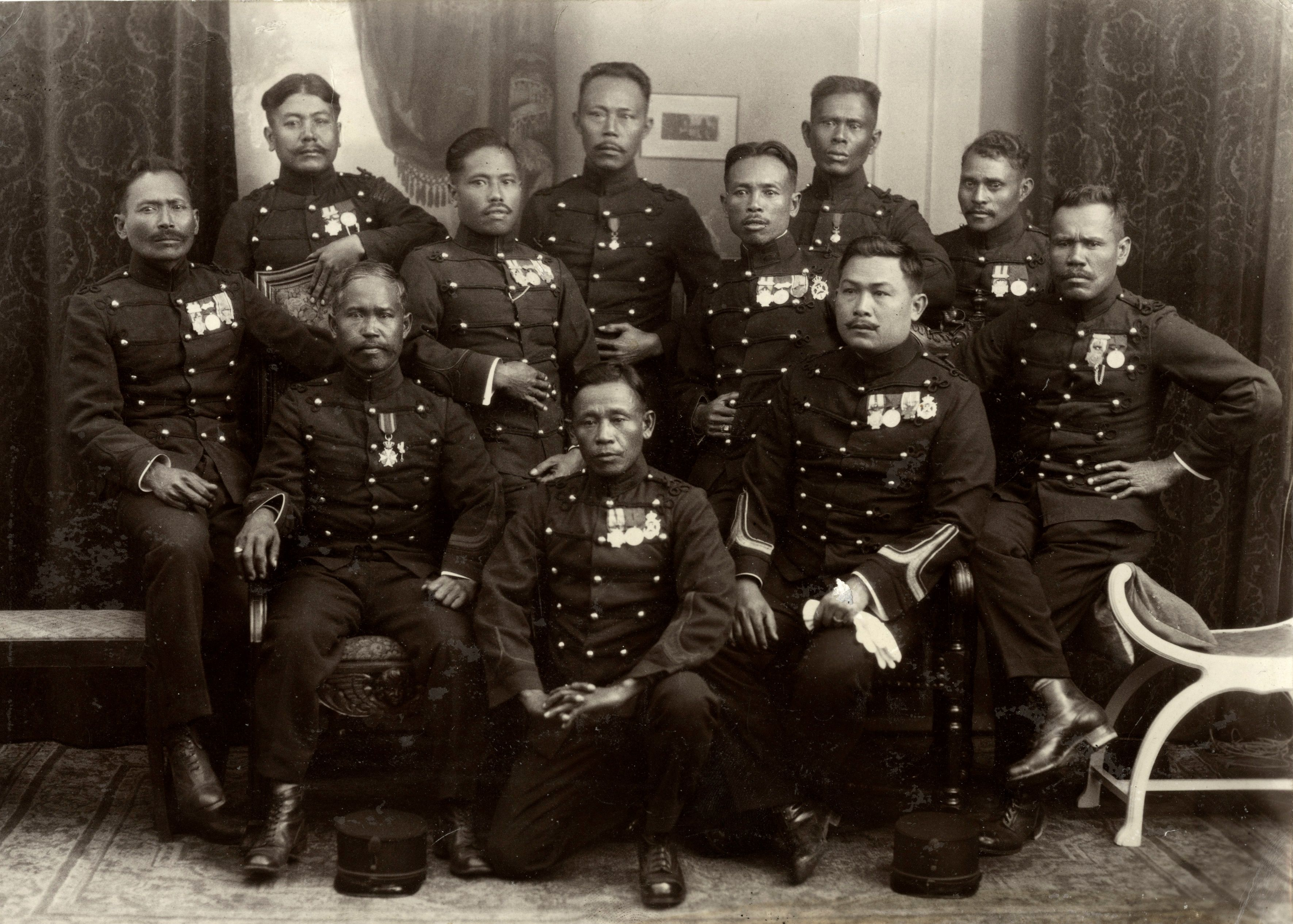
Decorated KNIL soldiers, 1927

A relatively large number of the professional soldiers serving in the Royal Dutch East Indies Army (KNIL) were recruited among the population of Ambon and the surrounding South Moluccan islands. The South Moluccan islands were among the first to come under European influence in the 16th century. The Protestant mission had been more successful there than elsewhere in the East Indies; half the Ambonese population adhered to the Calvinist branch of Protestantism.

As early as 1605 armed Dutch merchantmen of the VOC captured the Portuguese fort at the location of Ambon city in the South Moluccas. It was an area already strongly influenced by the Portuguese (Portuguese family names, religion and language were common) and the Dutch developed it into the first secure base of the Dutch East India Company (VOC).

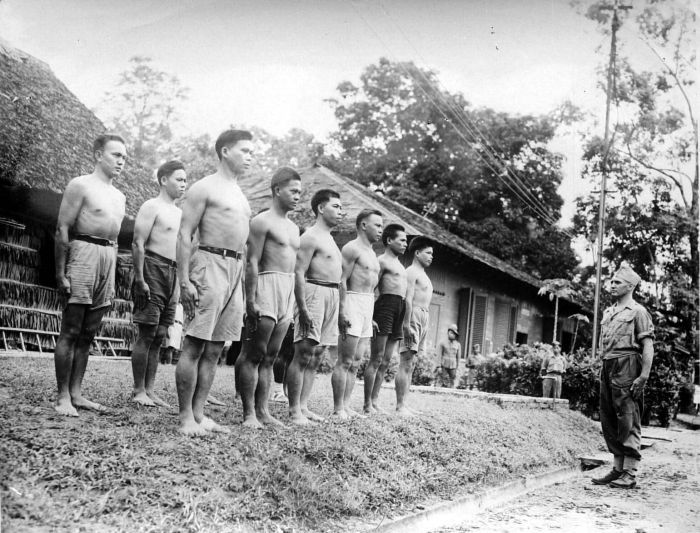
KNIL recruits being trained on Ambon

During the era of the VOC, the Moluccans were not only forced to trade with the VOC only, but also to focus solely on the production of cloves. After the downfall of the VOC and the collapse of the trade in cloves, they were fully dependent on the colonial structure and found occupation in the colonial army. The Ambonese were regarded as fierce fighters, reliable soldiers and absolutely loyal to the Dutch Crown. It was precisely this reputation that made them unpopular with other Indonesian nationalities. All of this put them in a difficult position during both the Japanese occupation and the Indonesian national revolution. During the Japanese occupation in the Second World War, most of the Moluccan soldiers were only briefly interned as prisoners of war (POWs). Initially, the Japanese occupation force decided to release them from military duty and send them home. However, the Japanese quickly discovered their miscalculation when the Moluccans became among the most active in the resistance movement against them. Throughout the occupied Dutch East Indies, Moluccan soldiers created underground resistance cells aiding the Allied forces. Some of these cells were active in gathering intelligence; other sleeper cells hid weapons in strategic locations waiting to take up arms during an Allied invasion. The Japanese secret police (Kempeitai) responded by torturing and beheading any suspect, which usually did not deter the Moluccans.

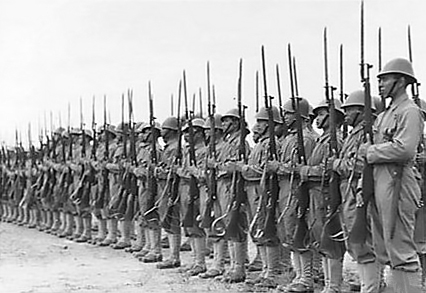
KNIL regiment, 1943.

After the capitulation of the Imperial Japanese Army to the Allied forces, the Moluccan soldiers acted equally defiantly towards the Indonesian revolutionaries trying to fill the power vacuum left by the Japanese. Smaller scale conflicts in the Bersiap period between regrouped Moluccan fighting units and Permuda groups usually left the well-trained Moluccan fighters victorious. In their efforts to subdue the counter revolutionary RMS movement on Ambon, the newly established Tentara Nasional Indonesia (Republican Indonesian army, TNI) encountered the military prowess of the Moluccan special troops. The heavy fighting triggered them to create their own special troops. At that time the Moluccan special troops' only contemporaries were the Gurkha units of the British Indian Army.

=== Disbanding the colonial army ===
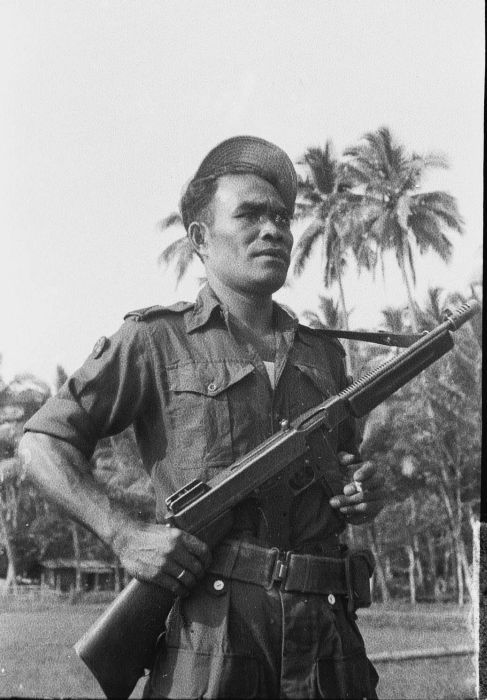
South Moluccan KNIL soldier

During the Indonesian National Revolution, the Dutch had to disband the reinstated KNIL, and the native soldiers had the choice of either being demobilised or joining the army of the Republic of Indonesia. Due to a deep distrust of the Republican leadership, which was predominantly Javanese Muslim, this was an extremely difficult choice for the Protestant Ambonese, and only a minority chose to serve with the Indonesian Army. Disbanding proved a complicated process and, in 1951, two years after the transfer of sovereignty, not all soldiers had been demobilised. The Dutch were under severe international pressure to disband the colonial army and temporarily made these men part of the regular Dutch army, while trying to demobilise them in Java. Herein lay the source of the discontent among the Moluccan soldiers as, according to the KNIL policy, soldiers had the right to choose the place where they were to be discharged at the end of their contract. The political situation in the new Republic of Indonesia was initially unstable and, in particular, controversy over a federal or centralised form of the state resulted in armed conflicts in which Ambonese ex-KNIL men were involved. In 1950 an independent Republic of the South Moluccas (Indonesian: RMS, Republik Maluku Selatan) was proclaimed at Ambon. The RMS had strong support among the Ambonese and former Moluccan KNIL soldiers. As a consequence the Moluccan soldiers located outside the South Moluccas demanded to be discharged at Ambon. But Indonesia refused to let the Dutch transport these soldiers to Ambon as long as the RMS was not repressed, fearing prolonged military struggle. When after heavy fighting the RMS was repressed at Ambon, the soldiers refused to be discharged there. They now demanded to be demobilised at Seram, where pockets of resistance against Indonesia still existed. This was again blocked by Indonesia.

=== Invasion of Ambon ===
At the time of the proclamation, 1,739 KNIL troops, including 1,080 Ambonese, were stationed at Ambon. These soldiers became the backbone of the Armed Forces of RMS (APRMS). After a naval blockade by the Indonesian navy, Federal Indonesia Armed Forces (APRIS) invaded Ambon on 28 September 1950. The APRMS fled from the town of Ambon before the invading Indonesian troops had taken up positions in old Dutch fortifications in the hills overlooking the town. From here they waged guerrilla warfare. The TNI took control of northern half of the island, but were halted by fierce Ambonese resistance at the one-kilometre wide isthmus, which links the southern half. On 5 November, the city of Ambon fell to APRIS. The RMS government went to Ceram in December to continue the RMS battle in the form of a guerrilla war.

In 1 February, 1955, there were plans to proclaim the Maluku islands as part of the Islamic State of Indonesia (Darul Islam). However, before it could be made, Latang, the person chosen to be the commander of the Islamic Army of the Moluccas, was arrested.

=== Demobilisation of the Moluccan soldiers to the Netherlands ===
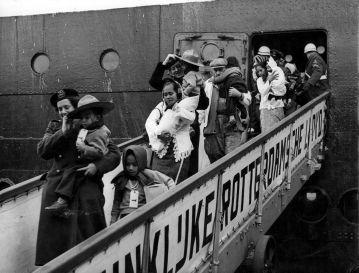
South Moluccans disembarking the ship Kota Inten, Rotterdam, 1951.

The Dutch government finally decided to transport the remaining men and their families to the Netherlands. They were discharged on arrival and 'temporarily' housed in camps until it was possible for them to return to the Moluccan islands. In this way around 12,500 persons were settled in the Netherlands, more or less against their will and certainly also against the original plans of the Dutch government. The reaction of the Dutch government to the settlement of the Moluccan soldiers was exactly the opposite of the reaction to the Indo repatriates. Whereas the latter were defined as fellow-citizens who had to be integrated as quickly and as fully as possible, the Moluccans were considered to be temporary residents who had to be repatriated to Indonesia. They were 'temporarily' housed in camps, mostly in rural areas and near small towns. A special agency was set up to manage all matters concerning these temporary residents, the 'Commissariaat Ambonezenzorg' (CAZ). the camps included the former Nazi transit camp Westerbork.

To deal with all kinds of daily matters the CAZ created 'representatives' in the camps who regulated the lives of the inhabitants in accordance with the rules. These representatives were (mostly) recruited from among the non-commissioned officers, who were in this way able, to a certain extent, to re-establish their status in the new circumstances. The housing situation in the camps resembled in many ways the barracks of the colonial army, where the soldiers were housed, together with their families, under the direct supervision of non-commissioned officers. This specific housing situation contributed greatly to the isolation of the Moluccan population from Dutch society. The camps, and later the neighbourhoods, became enclaves where the schools, though officially Dutch in programme and language, became exclusively Moluccan and where access to the labour market was geographically often restricted. Even when it became more and more obvious that there was no possibility to repatriate the ex-servicemen to Indonesia, the Dutch government did not formulate a radically different policy.

There was little integration from these camps into the wider Dutch population. The purported government-in-exile was not recognised by the government, but due to Dutch antipathy to Indonesian authorities, did not face serious opposition in its activities. Following the settlement of the West New Guinea dispute in 1963, after which the Netherlands ceded Netherlands New Guinea to Indonesia, Dutch relations with Indonesia improved, and the South Moluccan movement lost support. A small number returned to Indonesia as part of a voluntary repatriation, but some of these returned due to the difficulty of adjusting.

Video footage of the arrival of KNIL soldiers

This situation dragged on until 1970 when the CAZ was finally dissolved and normal ministerial and other agencies became responsible. The Dutch government had at last admitted that the Moluccans were not temporary residents and that their future lay in the Netherlands. Still, in 1968 more than 80 per cent of the Moluccans were still without official citizenship, i.e. stateless. The ex-soldiers were deeply frustrated by the demise of the colonial army. The KNIL had offered not only an income, but also a whole way of life in which their status was secure. They had always been loyal to the Dutch Crown and had felt betrayed when their services were no longer rewarded. In response they had pinned their hopes on an independent RMS and had expected that the Dutch would help them to realise it.

These feelings continued and were even strengthened in the years of isolated settlement in the Netherlands. There seemed to be only one worthwhile ideal and that was the creation of the RMS. But whatever the merits of this ideal, the Moluccans in the Netherlands could do nothing to bring its realisation any nearer. Moreover, the isolated situation in the camps and neighbourhoods had given rise to a type of expressive leadership that could only manifest itself in opposing and confronting the CAZ and the Dutch in general.

==== South Moluccan terrorist action in the Netherlands ====
This situation led to growing tension and to splits within the RMS movement. The older generation of leaders of the RMS movement saw their authority challenged. Finally the crisis in the Ambonese communities exploded in a decade of violence against internal rivals and Dutch society. A series of terrorist attacks started in 1970 with a raid on the residence of the Indonesian ambassador in Wassenaar. The Dutch reaction to this attack was restrained. The attackers received mild sentences and were still seen as misguided idealists. Within the Moluccan community the 'boys of action' gained great prestige. This fuelled further terrorist actions in 1975 and 1977. As with the attack in Wassenaar, the aims of these actions were not very clear; apart from restoring unity within the RMS movement, it is difficult to see any concrete objectives in the vague rhetoric and impossible political demands made by the attackers. Attacks on a train and on a village school in 1977 led to a final escalation of the violence. The Dutch government saw no other way out than to use military force to end the action. Meanwhile, support for this kind of action within the Moluccan community was ebbing. Instead of reuniting the Moluccans in the Netherlands, this radicalism threatened to lead to more division. When, in 1978, a group of youngsters raided the seat of the provincial government in Assen, they received not the slightest support.

=== Second and third generation Moluccans in the Netherlands ===
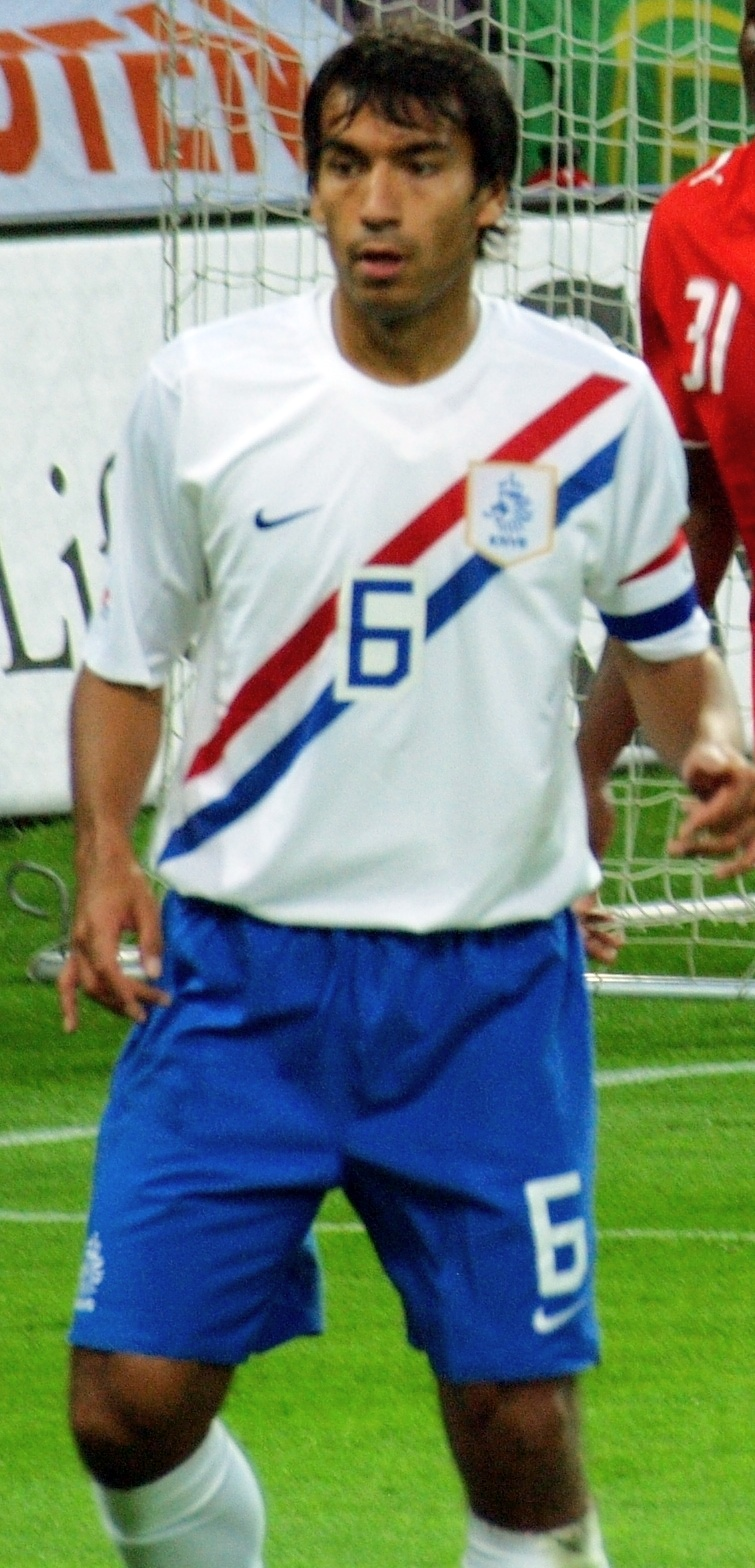
Giovanni van Bronckhorst playing football for the National Team of the Netherlands

Towards the end of this period of terrorist violence, the Dutch government had already dropped the idea that the Moluccans were temporary residents, but had not been able to create a channel of communication through which to discuss and implement policy measures that opened a way to the future. The social situation left much to be desired; school attainment was low and unemployment high. Earlier attempts to set up a communal platform for the government and Moluccan representatives had not been successful, because of antagonism within the Moluccan communities and impossible political demands made at the outset by the Moluccans. In 1976 a platform was formed where government policy measures could be discussed with representatives of the Moluccan community, the IWM (Dutch abbreviation for: Inspraakorgaan Welzijn Molukkers). In 1978 a substantial White Paper ("De Problematiek van de Molukkers in Nederland") was sent by the government to parliament. It offered measures to enhance Moluccan participation in Dutch society, in particular in the fields of education and the labour market.

The IWM has proved a valuable communication channel for communal projects. A case in point was the plan to create thousands of jobs for Moluccans in government service. The primary goal was to combat high unemployment, but a secondary goal was to open up a particular section of the labour market where Moluccans were significantly underrepresented. The recognition that employment, education and social welfare in general were important fields where the situation of the Moluccan population, and especially of the new generation, had to be improved, was a positive development. Partly because the second generation was already much more oriented to Dutch society, partly as a result of the policy of affirmative action, participation in the labour market and in the school system developed positively after 1980. Levels of educational attainment rose, unemployment levels were lower and the jobs fulfilled were also somewhat higher in scale. In general the second-generation Moluccans made a great leap forward in this period, compared to the first 'soldier generation'.

The situation of the Moluccans in the Netherlands is at present remarkably different from that in 1970. Practically all Moluccans are now Dutch citizens. This makes it more difficult to give the precise number of Moluccans in the Netherlands, though research shows that there are to date about 40,000 persons who can be classified as Moluccan. A majority of this population identifies itself to a certain extent with the Moluccan islands where their families once came from, but this identification seems less and less an impediment to integration in Dutch society. In this sense the Moluccans have at last become 'normal immigrants'.

Notwithstanding Moluccan integration into modern Dutch society has halted terrorist radicalisation, up to the 1990s the Netherlands were reminded yearly of the traumatic side of their colonial past, when celebrations of the RMS independence declaration frequently resulted in angry sentiments or even serious rioting in the streets of the capital.

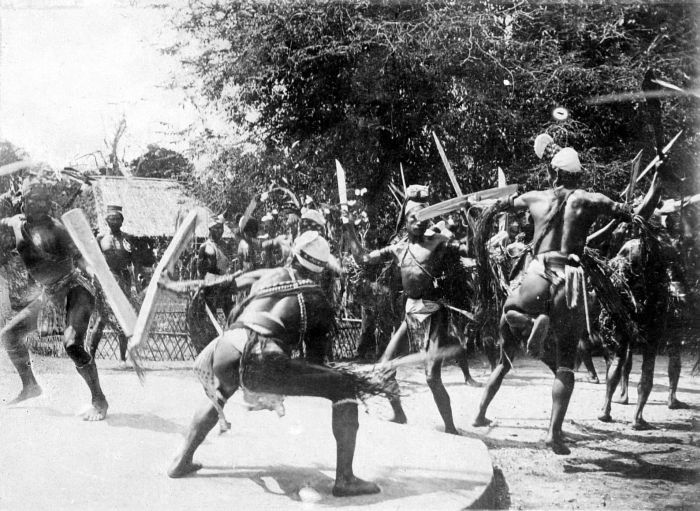
Image showing traditional cakalele dance performance; nowadays Moluccans are rediscovering their ancient cultural traditions.

In the 1950s and 1960s Moluccan musicians made their mark together with artists from the Indo community. In the 1980s, bands like Massada were popular. Massada's hit song "Sajang e" is the only song in the Malay language to reach number one in the Netherlands. Also from the South Moluccan community in the Netherlands is the singer songwriter Daniel Sahuleka. In Indonesia, many famous musicians are ethnic Moluccans, like pop star Glenn Fredly, who toured the Netherlands in 2008 and acknowledged Daniel Sahuleka as one of his main inspirations. In the 21st century, new generations of South Moluccans in the Netherlands have chosen ways to manifest their heritage and express themselves, by performing traditional Tifa music and Cakalele dances, but also by expressing themselves with contemporary music like hip-hop. In addition, in Dutch football many South Moluccans in the Netherlands have made names for themselves, including Simon Tahamata and Bobby Petta, as well as Denny Landzaat and Giovanni van Bronckhorst, whose mothers are Moluccan.

== 21st century ==
=== Events in the Netherlands ===
The Indonesian ambassador to the Netherlands, Yunus Effendi Habibie, told Radio Netherlands Worldwide in 2009 that Indonesia was pleased that the exiled Moluccan government is no longer striving for an independent state. According to the ambassador, Moluccans already have autonomy, so the present situation need not be changed. He rejects full Moluccan independence. Habibie's comments come in response to a decision by the designated new president of the Moluccan government-in-exile, John Wattilete's words that an independent Moluccan state is no longer its absolute priority. Although independence is still the ultimate goal, he says he would be satisfied with a form of autonomy similar to that introduced in Aceh. "The most important thing is that Moluccans themselves are in charge."

John Wattilete became RMS president in April 2010. He is the first to come from the second generation of Moluccans in the Netherlands and is regarded as more pragmatic than previous leaders. However one day before Indonesian President Yudhoyono's planned state visit to the Netherlands, the first such visit since 1970, Wattilete issued legal proceedings to have him arrested upon entering the country. Although legal experts called this action senseless and without much chance of success, Yudhoyono cancelled his visit the next day.

=== Events in Indonesia ===
The South Moluccan people are predominantly Christian, unlike most regions in Indonesia which are overwhelmingly Muslim. The South Moluccan Republic, however, was also supported by some Moluccan Muslims in the region at that time. Today the memory of the RMS and its separatist objectives still resonates in Indonesia. Moluccan Christians, during the sectarian violence of 1999–2002 in the Moluccas, were accused by Muslim groups of having independence as their goal. This accusation has been useful in galvanising Muslims to fight (Laskar Jihad), and the situation has not been aided by the fact that some diaspora Moluccan Christian groups have taken up the RMS banner.

In the Moluccas, the Malino II Accord was signed to end conflict and create peace in the Moluccas, asking Moluccans "to reject and oppose all kinds of separatist movements, among others the Republic of South Moluccas (RMS), that threaten the unity and sovereignty of the Unitary State of the Republic of Indonesia". However, during the visit to Ambon of the Indonesian president in the summer of 2007, RMS sympathisers disturbed ceremonies by performing the Moluccan war dance and hoisting the RMS flag.

Since 1999, a new organisation known as the Maluku Sovereignty Front (FKM) has operated in Ambon, stockpiling weapons and flying the RMS flag in public places. The leader of the FKM organisation, Alex Manuputty, has fled to the United States, but continues to support independence.

On 26 October 2020, three activists were jailed for three years after being charged with treason for flying the RMS flag.

On 9 May 2024, a teenager named Khoider Ali Ringirfuryaan alias "Dede" who was 15 years old was detained by Maluku Regional Police for carrying the Benang Raja flag of the Republic of South Maluku during the watch together (Indonesian: nonton bareng) play-off match 2024 Paris Olympics between Indonesia U23 against Guinea U23 at Merdeka Field, Ambon. This sparked controversy in Indonesia, especially in Maluku Province and the Moluccans community in the Netherlands. The Government of the Republic of South Maluku through its official Instagram account expressed its concern over the arrest of a 15 year old teenager and condemned the Government of Indonesia.

== Exile ==
The main stronghold of the rebellious RMS group on Ambon was defeated by Indonesian forces in November 1950, while a smaller scale guerrilla struggle continued on Ceram until 1962. The defeat on Ambon however resulted in the flight of the self-declared RMS government from the islands, and the formation of a government in exile in the Netherlands. The following year some 12,000 Moluccan soldiers accompanied by their families went to the Netherlands, where they established a "Republic of the South Moluccas" government-in-exile.

During their exile parts of the RMS movement have committed terror attacks in the Netherlands. Most research argues that the attacks were caused by frustration over the lack of support from the Dutch government.

The first attack took place in 1970 at the Indonesian Ambassador's house at Wassenaar, during which a Dutch policeman was shot and killed. This attack was followed up in 1975 with the hijacking of a train at Wijster which was spontaneously supported by another, improvised, attack on the Indonesian consulate in Amsterdam. Three hostages were executed in the train and one Indonesian man was mortally wounded while trying to escape the consulate. In 1977 another train was hijacked, this time at De Punt, supported by a primary school hijack at Bovensmilde. These actions were ended with force by marines of the Bijzondere Bijstands Eenheid (BBE) in which six hijackers and two hostages died. The last action took place in 1978 when the provincial building in Assen was occupied. This action too was ended by BBE marines.

From the 1980s no such actions re-occurred.

Junus Effendi Habibie, the previous Indonesian ambassador to the Netherlands and brother to the third president of Indonesia, has said that he would do all he can to facilitate the repatriation of first generation Moluccans to their homeland, if they would stop aiming at an independent state.

== Presidents ==
Chris Soumokil was the RMS president in 1954 who went into hiding and led the armed guerrilla struggle on Seram island. He was only captured by the Indonesian Army in Ceram on 2 December 1962. Brought to trial before a military tribunal in Jakarta, he was sentenced to death and executed under President Suharto's rule on 12 April 1966.

The first president in exile was Johan Manusama (1966–1993).

The government-in-exile continues to exist, with Frans Tutuhatunewa as head of state (1993–2010). However it no longer advocates violent action towards either the Netherlands or Indonesia. The president in exile has said that the young generations should focus on their education and development opportunities in the Netherlands if they want to potentially support and develop the South Moluccas.

John Wattilete became RMS president in April 2010. He is the first to come from the second generation of Moluccans in the Netherlands and is regarded as more pragmatic than previous leaders.

== State symbols ==
=== Flag ===
The RMS flag is vertical blue, white, green, red (1:1:1:6) and has proportions 2:3. It was first hoisted 2 May 1950 at 10.00 AM. Two days later the government gave the explanation of the flag. Blue symbolises the sea and loyalty, white stands for purity, peace and the white beaches, green the vegetation, and red the ancestors and blood of the people.

Coat of Arms of the Republic of South Maluku

=== Coat of arms ===
The RMS coat of arms depicts the white Moluccan dove called 'Pombo'. The white dove is seen as a symbol of positivity and a good omen. The 'Pombo' is shown, about to start flying, the wings half opened and in its beak a peace branch, the chest tattooed with a crossed 'parang', 'salawaku' and spear.

The blazon of the RMS coat of arms state the words 'Mena – Moeria'. This slogan is derived from the original Melanesian Moluccan language. Since ancient times it is yelled by the steerer and paddlers of the traditional Moluccan rowing boats called 'Kora Kora', to synchronise their strokes during off shore expeditions. It literally means 'Front – Back', but is also translated as 'I go – We follow' or 'One for all – All for One'.

=== Anthem ===
The RMS anthem is called "Maluku, Tanah Airku," which translates to English as "Maluku, My Homeland." The anthem was written by president Chris Soumokil and O. Sahalessy in the Malay language, with Melanesian Moluccan words mixed in. It mentions the Via Dolorosa in Jerusalem, likening the suffering and struggle of Christian South Moluccans to the suffering of Jesus during his crucifixion.

Original text

Oh Maluku, tanah airku,
Tanah tumpah darahku.
Ku berbakti kepadamu
Slama hari hidupku.
Engkaulah pusaka raya
Yang leluhur dan teguh.
Aku junjung selamanya
Hingga sampai ajalku.
Aku ingat terlebih
Sejarahmu yang pedih.

Oh Maluku, tanah airku,
Tanah datuk-datukku.
Atas via dolorosa
Engkau hidup merdeka.
Putra-putri yang sejati
Tumpah darah bagimu.
Ku bersumpah trus berbakti
Serta tanggung nasibmu.
Aku lindung terlebih
Sejarahmu yang pedih.

Mena-Muria, printah leluhur
Segenap jiwaku seru.
Bersegralah membelamu
Seperti laskar yang jujur.
Dengan prisai dan imanku
Behkan harap yang teguh.
Ku berkurban dan berasa
Karena dikaa ibuku
Ku doakan terlebih
Mena-Muria, hiduplah!

English translation

Maluku, my homeland,
My land of origin.
I devote my strength to thee
As long as I may live.
Thou art my great heritage
Uplifted above all.
I will always honour thee
Until my dying day.
I will recall in memory
Above all thy harrowing history.

Maluku, my homeland,
Land of my ancestors.
Through this road of suffering
Will we reach liberty.
Thy true sons and daughters
Have shed their blood for thee.
I am sworn to dedication
To keep thy future safe.
Above all I will protect thee
And thy harrowing history.

Onwards without fear, the higher call
I yell wholeheartedly.
I hasten to defend thee
As an army just and true.
With shield and faith
And above all in great resilience
I will sacrifice and struggle.
For thou art my cradle
And above all I will pray
That our sacred call may forever live.

== See also ==
- E. U. Pupella
- Free South Moluccan Youths
- List of people from Maluku Islands
- Invasion of Ambon
- Maluku sectarian conflict
- Republic of West Papua
