= Edinho Pattinama =

Dutch footballer (born 1989)

Personal information
- Date of birth: 1 March 1989 (age 37)
- Place of birth: Spijkenisse, Netherlands
- Height: 1.79 m (5 ft 10 in)
- Position: Striker

Youth career
- Feyenoord

Senior career*
Years	Team	Apps	(Gls)
2008–2010	NAC Breda	5	(0)
2010–2011	RKSV Leonidas		
2013–2021	Deltasport Vlaardingen		
- * Club domestic league appearances and goals

Edinho Pattinama (born 1 March 1989) is a Dutch former professional footballer. He is the son of former footballer Ton Pattinama, who is the manager of Deltasport. His twin brother Jordao also plays for Deltasport.

== Career statistics ==
Season	Club	Country	League	Apps	Goals
2008–09	NAC Breda	Netherlands	Eredivisie	5	0
Total				5	0

(As of 20 December 2008)
