= Jerry Taihuttu =

Dutch footballer

Personal information
- Date of birth: 29 January 1970 (age 56)
- Place of birth: Venlo, Netherlands
- Position: Striker

Senior career*
Years	Team	Apps	(Gls)
1985–1989	VVV-Venlo	6	(0)
1989–1994	Fortuna Sittard	33	(3)
1992	→ Helmond Sport (loan)	18	(16)
1994–1996	Helmond Sport	52	(21)
1996–1998	TOP Oss	62	(41)
1998	MVV	15	(2)
1998–1999	Helmond Sport	11	(4)
1999–2001	BSV Bad Bleiberg		
2001–2002	FC Eindhoven	14	(6)
Total		211	(93)

Managerial career
- Vitesse'08
- VVV'03
- * Club domestic league appearances and goals

Jerry Taihuttu (born 29 January 1970) is a Dutch football coach and former professional player who played as a striker.

Active between 1985 and 2002, Taihuttu made over 200 appearances in Dutch football for six clubs, scoring nearly 100 goals. He also spent time playing professional football in Austria.

== Playing career ==
Born in Venlo, Taihuttu played for VVV-Venlo, Fortuna Sittard, Helmond Sport, TOP Oss MVV, BSV Bad Bleiberg, and FC Eindhoven.

== Coaching career ==
Taihuttu later became a coach with Vitesse'08. He later coached VVV'03, who were upheld to have unlawfully dismissed him in January 2012.

== Personal life ==
His elder brother John Taihuttu also played professionally.
