= Ton Pattinama =

Dutch footballer

Personal information
- Date of birth: 30 July 1956 (age 70)
- Place of birth: Netherlands
- Position: Midfielder

Senior career*
Years	Team	Apps	(Gls)
1975–1984	Excelsior	152	(13)
1984–1986	FC Den Bosch	49	(4)
1986–1988	FC Utrecht	41	(1)
1990–1991	Heracles Almelo	20	(0)
1991–1992	ADO Den Haag	3	(0)
- * Club domestic league appearances and goals

Ton Pattinama (born 30 July 1956, Rotterdam) is a Dutch retired footballer who played for Excelsior, FC Den Bosch, FC Utrecht, Heracles Almelo and ADO Den Haag. Football players Edinho (NAC Breda) and Jordao Pattinama (Feyenoord) are his sons.

Pattinama played for the (Dutch) Moluccan team several times.
