= Chris Soumokil =

Former president of the Republic of South Maluku

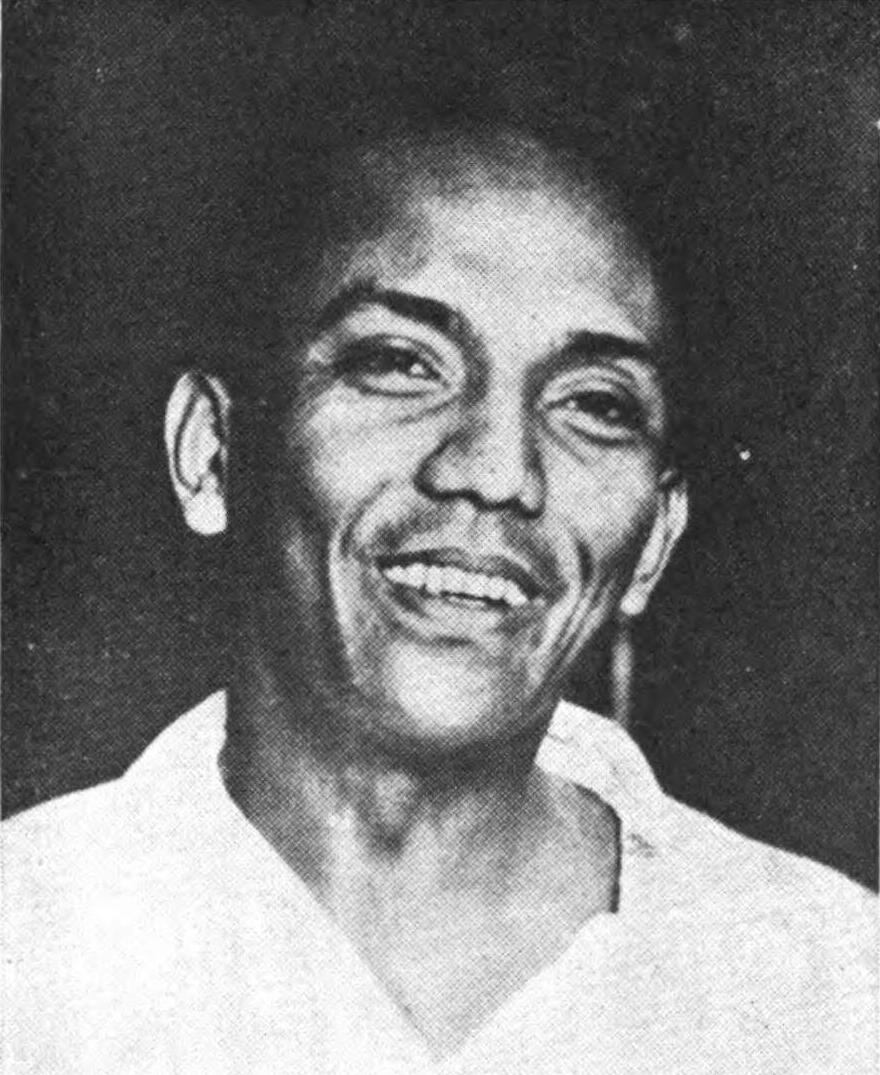
- Portrait, c. 1940s

2nd President of the Republic of South Maluku
- In office 3 May 1950 – 12 April 1966
- Preceded by: Johanis Manuhutu
- Succeeded by: Johan Manusama

Personal details
- Born: 13 October 1905 Soerabaja, Dutch East Indies
- Died: 12 April 1966 (aged 60) Pulau Ubi Basar, Jakarta, Indonesia
- Children: 2
- Education: Leiden University (1934)
- Occupation: Prosecutor

Christiaan Robbert Steven Soumokil (13 October 1905 – 12 April 1966) was a South Moluccan politician and prosecutor who served as the second president of the Republic of South Maluku from 1950 until his execution in 1966 by Indonesian forces loyal to Suharto.

== Early life ==
His father was Moluccan and his mother was an Indo (mixed Dutch and indigenous Indonesian descent). After high school, he studied law at Leiden University where he obtained a doctorate in 1934 before returning to Indonesia in 1935 and finding work as a law official in Java.

== Political career ==
Between May 1947 and February 1950, he served as Minister of Justice in four cabinets of the State of East Indonesia.

In April 1950, Soumokil, Johanis Manuhutu, and Albert Wairisal signed a declaration proclaiming the independence of the South Moluccas from the United States of Indonesia and the founding of an independent Republic of South Maluku. He became its second president on 3 May, a week after its creation.

== Exile and execution ==
After the Indonesian invasion of Ambon and its successful attack on the rebel capital of Ambon, Soumokil fled to the nearby island of Seram, where he led a small band of guerillas until his capture on 2 December 1963. He was initially imprisoned on Java.

Soumokil was executed by firing squad on 12 April 1966, on Pulau Ubi Besar by forces loyal to Suharto.

== See also ==
- Maluku sectarian conflict

== Bibliography ==
- Ide Anak Agung Gde Agung (1996) [1995]. From the Formation of the State of East Indonesia Towards the Establishment of the United States of Indonesia. Translated by Owens, Linda. Yayasan Obor. ISBN 979-461-216-2.
- Hellwig, T.; Tagliacozzo, E., eds. (2009). The Indonesia Reader. Durham: Duke University Press. ISBN 9780822344247.
- Hol, Antoine; Vervaele, John, eds. (2005). Security and Civil Liberties: The Case of Terrorism. Intersentia. ISBN 978-90-5095-508-9.
- "Chris Soumokil, Proklamator Republik Maluku Selatan", Tempo.co (in Indonesian), 6 October 2010
