= John Lilipaly =

Dutch politician (1943–2022)

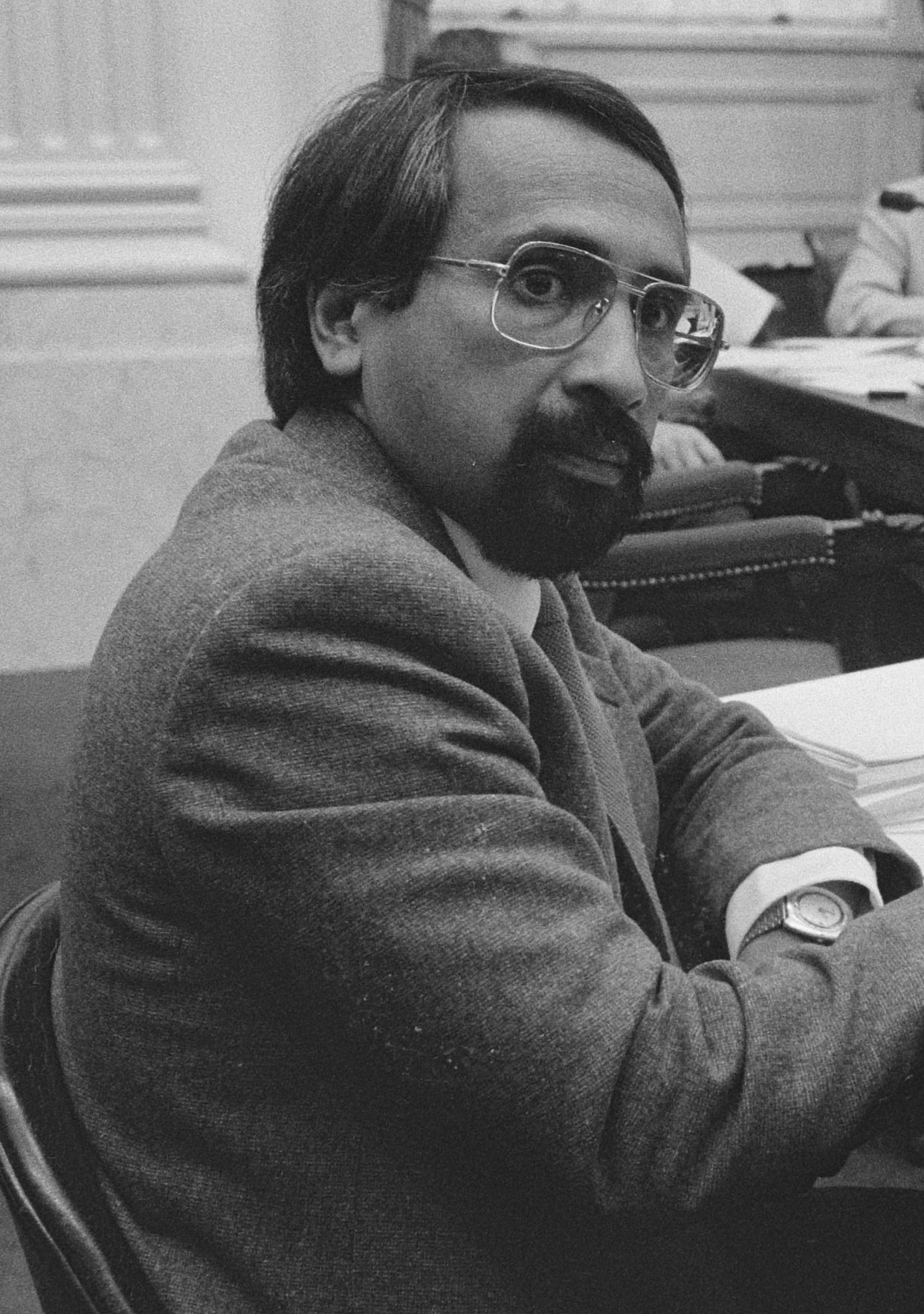
- Lilipaly in 1986

Member of the House of Representatives of the Netherlands
- In office 3 June 1986 – 19 May 1998

Personal details
- Born: Johan Jehosefat Lilipaly; 2 June 1943 Ihamahu, Saparua, Japanese-occupied Dutch East Indies
- Died: 22 October 2022 (aged 79) Middelburg, Netherlands
- Party: PvdA

Johan Jehosefat Lilipaly (2 June 1943 – 22 October 2022), better known as John Lilipaly, was a Dutch politician.

A member of the Labour Party, he served in the House of Representatives from 1986 to 1998.

Lilipaly died from complications from Alzheimer's disease on 22 October 2022, at the age of 79.

Lilipaly's daughter Carolyn is a television presenter.
