= Jordao Pattinama =

Dutch footballer (born 1989)

Personal information
- Date of birth: 1 March 1989 (age 37)
- Place of birth: Spijkenisse, Netherlands
- Height: 1.77 m (5 ft 10 in)
- Position: Midfielder

Team information
- Current team: HBSS

Youth career
- 2004–2006: Deltasport Vlaardingen
- 2006–2008: Feyenoord

Senior career*
Years	Team	Apps	(Gls)
2008–2010	Feyenoord	3	(0)
2009–2010	→ Excelsior (loan)	3	(0)
2010–2011	SC Feyenoord	?	(?)
2011–2012	Nieuwenhoorn	?	(?)
2012–2014	Deltasport Vlaardingen	?	(?)
2014–2015	RVVH	?	(?)
2015–2017	Capelle	42	(13)
2017–2022	Deltasport Vlaardingen	?	(?)
2022–2023	CWO		
2023–	HBSS		
- * Club domestic league appearances and goals as of 10 March 2009

Jordao Pattinama (born 1 March 1989) is a Dutch footballer who plays as a midfielder for Tweede Klasse club HBSS.

== Career statistics ==
Season	Club	Country	League	Apps	Goals
2008/09	Feyenoord	Netherlands	Eredivisie	3	0
Total				3	0

(As of 1 March 2009)

== Personal life ==
He is the son of former footballer Ton Pattinama. His twin brother Edinho plays for NAC Breda.
