= Christian Supusepa =

Dutch footballer

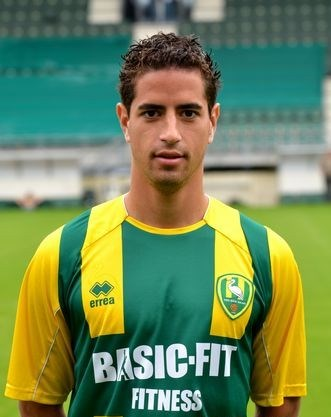

Personal information
- Full name: Christian Supusepa
- Date of birth: 2 April 1989 (age 37)
- Place of birth: Wormerveer, Netherlands
- Height: 1.83 m (6 ft 0 in)
- Positions: Left back; centre back

Team information
- Current team: SV Spakenburg
- Number: 30

Youth career
- Ajax

Senior career*
Years	Team	Apps	(Gls)
2010–2014	ADO Den Haag	60	(0)
2014–2015	CSKA Sofia	7	(0)
2015–2016	Sparta Rotterdam	6	(0)
2017–	SV Spakenburg	15	(0)

International career
2007–2009	Netherlands U19	6	(0)
- * Club domestic league appearances and goals as of 7 June 2017

Christian Supusepa (born 2 April 1989 in Wormerveer) is a Dutch footballer who currently plays as a left back for SV Spakenburg in the Dutch Tweede Divisie.

== Club career ==
On 7 July 2010 Supusepa signed a contract until 2012 with ADO Den Haag. He made his debut on 8 August in a game against Vitesse Arnhem. Supusepa joined A PFG club CSKA Sofia in July 2014 on a one-year contract with the option for an additional one. He left the "redmen" from Sofia at the end of the season, returning to his home country to become part of the Sparta Rotterdam squad. In January 2017 Supusepa signed with SV Spakenburg.

== Personal ==
He is of Moluccan descent.

== Honours ==
Sparta Rotterdam

- Eerste Divisie: 2015-16
