= Johan Manusama =

Moluccan-Dutch politician (1910-1995)

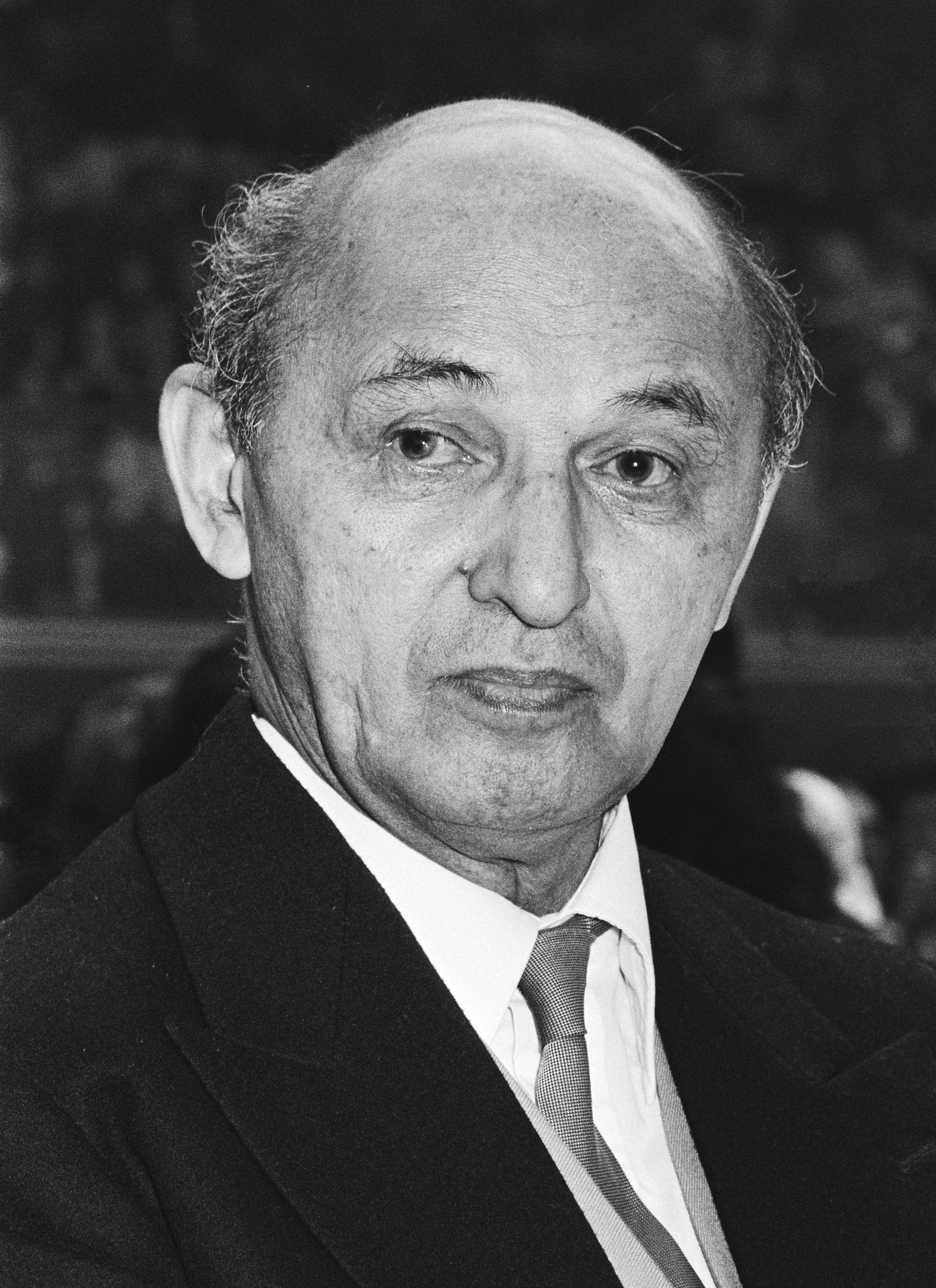
- Johan Manusama in 1979

(Republic of South Maluku) President of South Maluku (in exile)
- In office 1966–1993
- Preceded by: Chris Soumokil
- Succeeded by: Frans Tutuhatunewa

Personal details
- Born: 17 August 1910 Banjarmasin, Dutch East Indies
- Died: 29 December 1995 (aged 85) Rotterdam, Netherlands
- Party: NSB (1934-1940)

Johannes Alvarez Manusama (17 August 1910 – 29 December 1995), a former schoolteacher and freemason, RMS Minister of Education and Minister of Defence (1950), was the third president of the unrecognised secessionist Republic of South Moluccas (1966–1993).

Manusama was born on 17 August 1910 in Banjarmasin. His father was South Moluccan, while his mother was Indo. In his younger years, he was a member of the Indies NSB until 1940.

After briefly administering the aspirant state in the territory of the Moluccas in 1966, Manusama lived the rest of his life advocating independence and heading a government in exile in the Netherlands. During his time, he hosted a regular radio show, "Voice of the Moluccas" and entered the Republic of South Maluku into the Unrepresented Nations and Peoples Organization.

He died in Rotterdam on 29 December 1995, aged 85.
