= List of terrorist incidents in the Netherlands =

This article covers terrorist attacks and activity in the Netherlands.

== Terrorist attacks ==
- On 11 October 1971, during the controversial state visit of Japanese emperor Hirohito, the Red Youth group placed a bomb at his hotel in Amsterdam which failed to go off properly.
- On 6 February 1972, a Gasunie natural gas distribution pipe in Ravenstein was bombed, causing an enormous explosion and mushroom cloud and large-scale evacuations around the town. Another bomb at a Gasunie centre in Ommen was defused. The Palestine Liberation Organisation was thought to have been responsible.
- On 25 February 1972, a small explosion hit the Evoluon in Eindhoven, caused by members of the Red Youth. The group later also planted a bomb at Philips headquarters that failed to go off. The attacks were aimed at Philips because of them doing business in Greece, which was under a far-right military junta regime.
- On 17-18 October 1972, members of the Red Youth planted several bombs: under the terms car of a Philips commissioner in Eindhoven; in front of a Bank of America branch in Rotterdam, which was defused; in front of a Zwolsche Algemeene branch in Utrecht; and in front of a Holiday Inn hotel in Utrecht, damaging the front façade. There were no injuries.
- 1974 French Embassy attack in The Hague by the Japanese Red Army
- 1975 Failed attempt at kidnapping Juliana of the Netherlands by South Moluccan independence activists
- 1975 Indonesian consulate hostage crisis
- 1975 Dutch train hostage crisis by South Moluccan independence activists
- 1977 Dutch train hijacking by South Moluccan independence activists
- 1977 Dutch school hostage crisis by South Moluccan independence activists
- On 22 September 1977, Red Army Faction member Knut Folkerts shot dead Dutch policeman Arie Kranenburg and seriously injured policeman Leen Pieterse in Utrecht
- 1978 Dutch province hall hostage crisis by South Moluccan independence activists
- On 1 November 1978, two Dutch customs officials Dionysius de Jong and Johannes Goemanns were shot at and killed by terrorists belonging to the Red Army Faction in Kerkrade
- Assassination of British ambassador Richard Sykes by the Irish Republican Army (IRA)
- Assassination of son of the Turkish ambassador Ahmet Benler by Armenian nationalists
- On 12 May 1982, the offices of the Pacifist Socialist Party in Tilburg was attacked by a bomb. Martijn Freling from the far-right Centre Party is thought to have been responsible.
- On 1 July 1982, the Red Armenian Army attempted to assassinate the Turkish Consul General, Kemalettin Demiren, in Rotterdam.
- On 31 July 1982, the headquarters of the Labour Party in Amsterdam was bombed by a group called Militant Autonomen Front.
- On 5 November 1985, a group called Autonomous Cells Netherlands tried to kill mayor of Amsterdam, Ed van Thijn, by detonating a bomb at his house - blaming him for the death of a squatter called Hans Kok. The bomb failed to go off.
- A left-wing terror group called Red Revolutionary Front launched several bomb attacks in 1985 and 1986 targeting office buildings including American Express in Rotterdam and the Netherlands Christian Employers' Association
- On 29 March 1986, far-left terrorists set fire to a hotel in Kedichem where members of the far-right Centre Party were meeting. Hans Janmaat escaped injury but Wil Schuurman lost her leg.
- 1988 IRA attacks in the Netherlands, by Irish nationalists
- ETA attacks in the Netherlands 1989-90 by Basque independence activists
- Killings of Nick Spanos and Stephen Melrose on 27 May 1990. The IRA shot and killed two Australian tourists mistaking them for British soldiers.
- On 19 March 1990, the Revolutionary Anti-Racist Action (RARA) group fire-bombed Royal Marechaussee barracks in Arnhem and Oldenzaal. A few days later, an offshoot of the RARA exploded a bomb by the Ministry of Justice building in The Hague.
- On 13 November 1991 State Secretary for Justice Aad Kosto's house in Grootschermer was destroyed by a car-bomb by the RARA.
- On 1 July 1993, the RARA bombed the Ministry of Social Affairs building in The Hague.
- On 2 January 1996, a Banque Paribas branch in Arnhem was bombed, causing considerable damage, and later on 17 April the Dutch BASF offices in Arnhem was also attacked with a bomb. This followed a failed molotov attack on a Credit Lyonnais branch in Arnhem on 17 October 1995. It is suspected the attacks were in protest against France's nuclear testing in the Pacific. The Earth Liberation Front claimed responsibility, but in 2008 Marcel Teunissen, a squatter found guilty of murdering Louis Sévèke, claimed responsibility.
- On 16 February 1999, a group of people linked to the Kurdistan Workers' Party took the wife of the Greek ambassador, her son and a servant, hostage in The Hague. They did so following the arrest of Abdullah Öcalan in Kenya and feeling betrayal from Greece for handing him over to Turkish intelligence. The hostages were released unhurt after 24 hours.
- On 6 May 2002, Dutch right-wing politician Pim Fortuyn was assassinated by left-wing activist Volkert van der Graaf after leaving the studio of the radio show 3FM, where he had appeared as a guest in an interview
- On 2 November 2004, Dutch filmmaker and political activist Theo van Gogh was assassinated by Mohammed Bouyeri, a second-generation Moroccan-Dutchman, Islamist and member of the Hofstad Network.
- On 30 April 2009, a Dutch man drove his car into a parade of the Dutch royal family during national holiday Koninginnedag in Apeldoorn, resulting in eight deaths, including himself, and leaving ten injured.
- On 27 February 2016, five men attacked a mosque full of visitors in Enschede with Molotov cocktails. The perpetrators were later jailed.
- 2018 Amsterdam stabbing attack: On 31 August 2018, an Afghan asylum seeker randomly attacked two people in Amsterdam Centraal station with a blade weapon - both victims were American-Eritrean tourists who were injured. The attacker was a 19-year-old asylum seeker from Afghanistan under the name Jawad S. who held a German residency permit and was denied asylum there. The suspect was aggrieved at the Netherlands for insulting Islam, directly referring to politician Geert Wilders.
- On 18 March 2019, Gökmen Tanis carried out a shooting attack against tram passengers in Utrecht, killing four civilians and wounding six others. Tanis was arrested and convicted of murder with terrorist intent and sentenced to life in prison. He expressed support for Islamic extremism.
- On 6 July 2021, prominent Dutch crime reporter Peter R. de Vries was shot in the head after leaving the studio of the television show RTL Boulevard, where he had appeared as a guest. He died from injuries on 15 July 2021.
- On 27 March 2025 Amsterdam stabbing attack, 30-year old Ukrainian citizen from Donetsk attacks 67-year-old woman and a 69-year-old man with American nationality, a 26-year-old man with Polish nationality, a 73-year-old Belgian woman and a 19-year-old woman in the Sint Nicolaasstraat area in the vicinity of Dam Square in central Amsterdam
- On 3 April 2025, a 50 year old Ukrainian national explodes a car in the Dam Square in response to the previous attack, luckily no one died

== Notable foiled plots ==
- 19 June 2018 – police forces arrest three men in Rotterdam, Schinnen and Groningen suspected of planning a terrorism act.
- In June 2018, two Moroccan-Dutch men were arrested in Rotterdam for plotting a jihadist attack. The investigators found a video of the Erasmus Bridge in one of their cell phones. In October 2020 they were sentenced to eight years in prison by a court in Rotterdam for planning an attack in the name of the Islamic State. One of the men was also convicted for destroying property in the prison while encouraged by the jihadist Mohamed B, who killed Theo van Gogh in a terrorist attack.
- In September 2018, police arrested seven men in Arnhem, on evidence that they were planning to attack a "large event" at two separate locations using a car bomb, other kinds of bombs, grenades and Kalashnikov assault rifles with intent to injure and kill "many victims."
- 26 November 2019 – police arrest two individuals, 20 and 34, in the city of Zoetermeer after they were tipped off that the duo were planning a jihadist attack with explosive belts and car bombs. Police found a throwing ax, a dagger, a mobile phone and several SIM cards in their apartment.

== Dutch-based terrorist organisations ==
- Hofstad Network (Hofstadnetwerk), Islamism
- Red Youth (Rode Jeugd), communism
- Revolutionary Anti-Racist Action (Revolutionaire Anti-Racistische Actie), anti-racism

== See also ==
- Assassination of Pim Fortuyn
- 2009 attack on the Dutch royal family
- Alphen aan den Rijn shopping mall shooting
- 2019 Utrecht shooting
- Terrorism in Europe
- Islamic terrorism in Europe
- List of terrorist incidents
- Terrorism in the United States
- Hindu terrorism
  - Violence against Christians in India
- Left-wing terrorism
- Right-wing terrorism
