= 1975 Dutch hostage crisis =

Dutch hostage crisis may refer to:

- 1975 Dutch train hostage crisis
- 1975 Indonesian consulate hostage crisis

== See also ==
- 1977 Dutch hostage crisis (disambiguation)
