= 1977 Dutch hostage crisis =

1977 Dutch hostage crisis may refer to:

- 1977 Dutch school hostage crisis
- 1977 Dutch train hijacking

== See also ==
- 1975 Dutch hostage crisis (disambiguation)
