= M-Squadron =

Dutch special forces unit

- Squadron Insignia
- Active: February 22, 1973–present
- Country: Netherlands
- Branch: Netherlands Marine Corps
- Type: Special Operations Forces
- Role: Special operations Counter-terrorism; Law enforcement
- Size: Classified
- Part of: NLMARSOF
- Garrison/HQ: Mariniers Training Commando, Doorn
- Motto: Semper Paratus Pro Justitia ("Always Ready for Justice")

Commanders
- Current commander: Classified

M-Squadron, formerly the Unit Interventie Mariniers (Marine Intervention Unit, UIM), and before that known as the Bijzondere Bijstandseenheid (Special Support Unit, BBE), is a Dutch special forces unit which is tasked with conducting domestic counter-terrorist operations. M-Squadron is part of the Netherlands Maritime Special Operations Forces of the Netherlands Marine Corps.

== History ==
On 22 February 1973, the Dutch government officially created a specialist counter-terrorism unit in response to the Munich massacre, when 11 Israeli athletes were murdered by Palestine pro-Fatah militants. The government felt the urge of protecting the nation against such incidents in the future, and so members of the Dutch Marine Corps were selected for this special unit. Marines were chosen because, at that time, they were particularly notorious: Dutch marines are hardened, highly trained, professional soldiers.

On July 1, 2006, a new government organ, Dienst Speciale Interventies (DSI) was founded. This is a joint operations centre for counter-terrorism actions in the Netherlands. Members of the UIM and special police units work together, and form a Unit Interventie, which is a joint task force of Defence and police personnel.

As part of the reorganization, the BBE changed its name in 2006 to the UIM. In 2009, the UIM changed its name once again to M-Squadron.

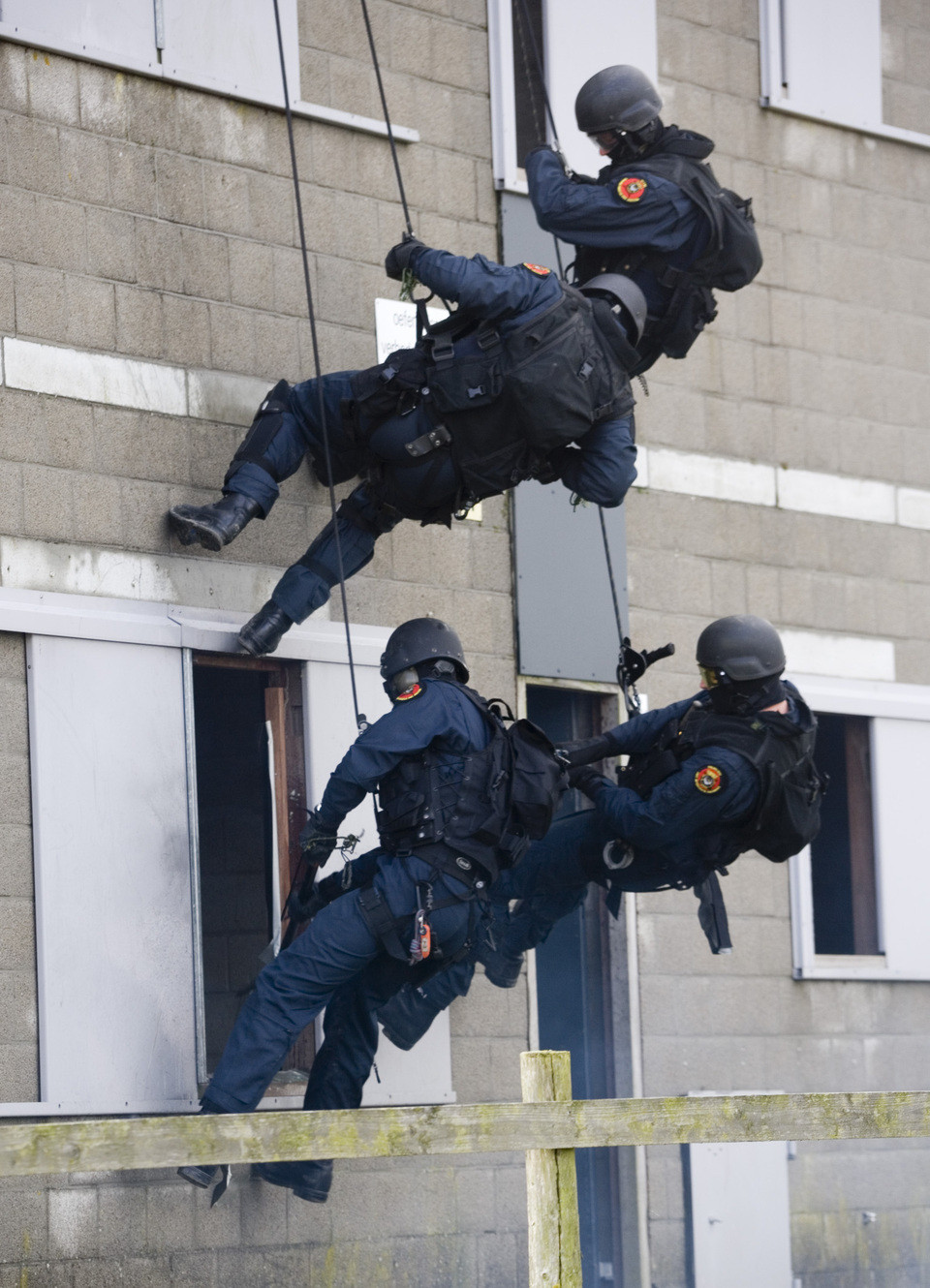

The unit was reorganized into the Maritime Special Operations Force since January 1, 2009.

== Role ==
It consists of a selection of specially trained marines of the Dutch Marine Corps, and it is part of the Netherlands Maritime Special Operations Forces (NLMARSOF), which is the maritime counterpart of the Dutch Army's Korps Commandotroepen. NLMARSOF is able to operate in and outside of the Netherlands, with emphasis on maritime special operations.

It currently consists of two operational SOF squadrons, one training squadron and a support group;

- C Squadron (Mountain Leader Recon and Amphibian Recon) – Foreign operations
- M Squadron (Counter-Terrorism) – Domestic operations
- T Squadron (Training Squadron)
- Special Operation Forces Support Group

M-Squadron consists of teams of six operators, each team and each operator with their own specialty. Among those are diver and breach teams. Tasks are:

- To conduct special operations on sea and land;
- To conduct quick-reaction counter-terrorism and hostage release operations in the Netherlands;
- To provide quick-reaction maritime intervention (harbours, oil platforms, ships, etc.);
- To assist the Dutch police and Royal Marechaussee in domestic joint law enforcement and counter-terrorism operations;
- To act as a security detachment on board Royal Netherlands Navy ships during humanitarian or peace-enforcing/-keeping missions;

=== Within DSI ===
The Dienst Speciale Interventies is the joint operations centre for domestic CT operations, and it combines special units from the Ministries of Defence and Justice. These units are:

- Unit Arrest Teams: regional police tactical units of the National Police Corps.
- Unit Intervention: rapidly deployable counter-terrorist unit consisting of both military and law enforcement personnel.
- Unit Expertise and Operational Support: support unit providing sniper fire support, crisis negotiation and technical support.

== Operations ==
The UIM has seen a lot of action since its creation. The first real intervention mission was the recapture of the Scheveningen prison in October 1974. Operators used hand-to-hand combat and stun grenades against jailed terrorists, who had revolted and held the prison under siege.

The best-known intervention mission was ending the combined siege of a train and a primary school, which was done by South Moluccan terrorists. The UIM managed to kill the six captors on the train during a short but precise raid. Two hostages did not survive this. The raid was successful due to the fact that the Royal Netherlands Air Force was called in, with six F-104 Starfighter aircraft making very low flypast manoeuvres in full afterburn. This was mainly a distraction, allowing for a swift raid and the killing of the six captors on board. The siege at the primary school ended not long after the train siege had ended.

On 13 March 1978, the UIM responded to a province hall hostage crisis in Assen. The raid came just in time: the hijackers had almost executed two people.

The UIM was meant to be deployed to enforce arms embargoes in the Balkans, but they were never deployed in the 1990s.

A known operation of the UIM was on 10 November 2004 in The Hague. The police had tried to arrest Ismail A. and Jason W. (members of the Hofstad Network) in a house at the Laakkwartier, but failed, as three police officers had been injured by grenades thrown at them by the terrorists. UIM operators were ordered to secure and maintain the site. After a successful raid, the two young terrorists were arrested.

The unit has been deployed to Afghanistan under Task Force 55 with KCT operators.

In 2008, the UIM had been active in the seas near Somalia as a security detachment for the Royal Netherlands Navy frigate Hr. Ms. De Ruyter, that was tasked with the escort of cargo ships that were contracted by the United Nations' World Food Programme. The unit was deployed several times to fight off pirates that attempted to raid the ships, and some teams were stationed on some of the ships as well.

In April 2010, an UIM-team embarked on board Hr. Ms. Tromp re-captured the German container ship MS Taipan off the coast of Somalia, that was under the control of Somali pirates. Though multiple shots were fired, including a machine gun barrage on the ship's bridge, the only injury was an operator that was slightly injured when he fell while storming the ship. A video released by the Royal Netherlands Navy, shows helmet camera footage of the Marines storming and re-taking the ship.

== Equipment ==
=== Weaponry ===
Name	Origin	Type	Cartridge	Image	Details
Glock 17	Austria	Semi-automatic pistol	9×19mm Parabellum		Standard issue pistol within NLMARSOF. Fitted with a laser light module.
Mossberg 590	United States	Pump-action shotgun	12 gauge		Used with buckshot ammunition and fitted with a pistol grip, optimised for door breaching.
FN P90	Belgium	Personal defense weapon	FN 5.7×28mm		Fitted with a suppressor, optics and a laser light module. Used by M-Squadron for domestic counter-terrorism operations.
Heckler & Koch MP7	Germany	Personal defense weapon	HK 4.6×30mm		Fitted with a suppressor, optics and a laser light module.
SIG MCX	Switzerland	Assault rifle	.300 AAC Blackout; 5.56×45mm NATO		Fitted with the SIG Sauer Suppressed Upper Receiver (SUR), an integral suppressor. In addition, it is fitted with a Magpul stock, SIG Sauer optics and a laser light module.
Heckler & Koch HK416	Germany	Assault rifle	5.56×45mm NATO		Standard-issue assault rifle within NLMARSOF. Fitted with a suppressor, optics and a laser light module.
Heckler & Koch HK417	Germany	Designated marksman rifle	7.62×51mm NATO		Both the regular HK417 and the G28 variant are in use within NLMARSOF.
Accuracy International AWM/AXMC	United Kingdom	Sniper rifle	.300 Winchester Magnum.338 Lapua Magnum		Anti-personnel sniper rifle in use with NLMARSOF sniper team. AXMC rifles, successor to the AWM, have recently been acquired to replace the aging AWM rifles.
Barrett M82	United States	Sniper rifle	.50 BMG		Anti-materiel rifle in use with NLMARSOF sniper teams.
Heckler & Koch UGL	Germany	Grenade launcher	40mm grenade		Undersling grenade launcher that can be fitted to the HK416 assault rifle.

=== Air transport ===
M-Squadron regularly trains for aerial deployments using helicopters. NH-90 utility helicopters of the Royal Netherlands Navy helicopters provide airlift, and can be utilised for fire support. In addition, three Dienst Luchtvaart Politie (Police Aviation Service) AW139 medium-sized helicopters are available for use by the DSI as well.

== See also ==
- Netherlands Maritime Special Operations Forces
