= 1978 Dutch province hall hostage crisis =

Terrorist incident in Assen, Netherlands

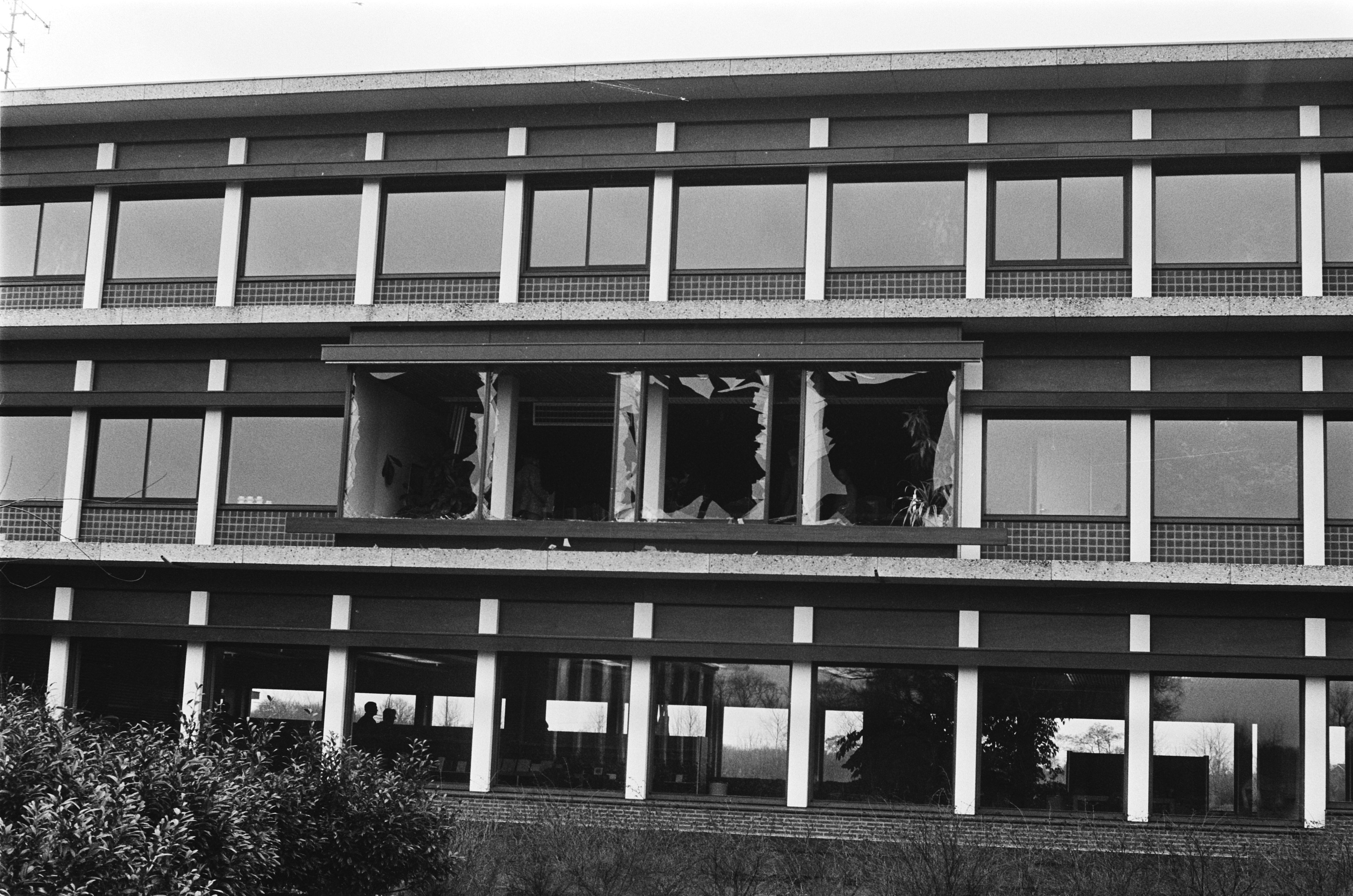
- Province Hall one day after the hostage crisis
- Location: 52.9854°N 6.5393°E; Assen, Netherlands
- Date: 13 - 14 March 1978
- Target: Drenthe Provincial government
- Attack type: Hostage-taking
- Weapon: Guns / Handguns
- Deaths: 2
- Injuries: 1
- Perpetrator: Moluccan youth (3 perpetrators)
- Motive: Release of 21 prisoners taken in previous hijackings

On the morning of Monday 13 March 1978, at 10:15, three South-Moluccans seized the Province Hall in Assen, Netherlands. Some of the people inside escaped by jumping out of the window, including the Queen's Commissioner of the Drenthe province. 16 women and 55 men were taken hostage. Two people were killed.

== Hostage-taking ==
The attackers demanded the release of 21 prisoners who were involved in earlier hijackings, and free transport to Schiphol airport and out of the country. An ultimatum was set for 14 March at 2 pm when the attackers would shoot two of the politicians, and then one further hostage every 30 minutes

After a few hours, hostage Ko de Groot was executed in front of a window and thrown out. A photographer was wounded and an ambulance trying to get to the body of Ko de Groot was shot at.

During the night, the marines of the Bijzondere Bijstands Eenheid (BBE) forced their way into the basement. The next day, 14 March at 2:34 pm, they raided the building from outside and from the basement, shortly after the attackers' deadline. One hostage was fatally wounded during the raid.

== See also ==
- Other South Moluccan terrorist actions:
  - Attempt at kidnapping Juliana of the Netherlands
  - 1975 Indonesian consulate hostage crisis
  - 1975 Dutch train hostage crisis
  - 1977 Dutch train hostage crisis
  - 1977 Dutch school hostage crisis
- List of hostage crises
- Terrorism in the European Union
- List of terrorist incidents in the Netherlands
