= Juliana of the Netherlands =

Queen of the Netherlands from 1948 to 1980

Juliana
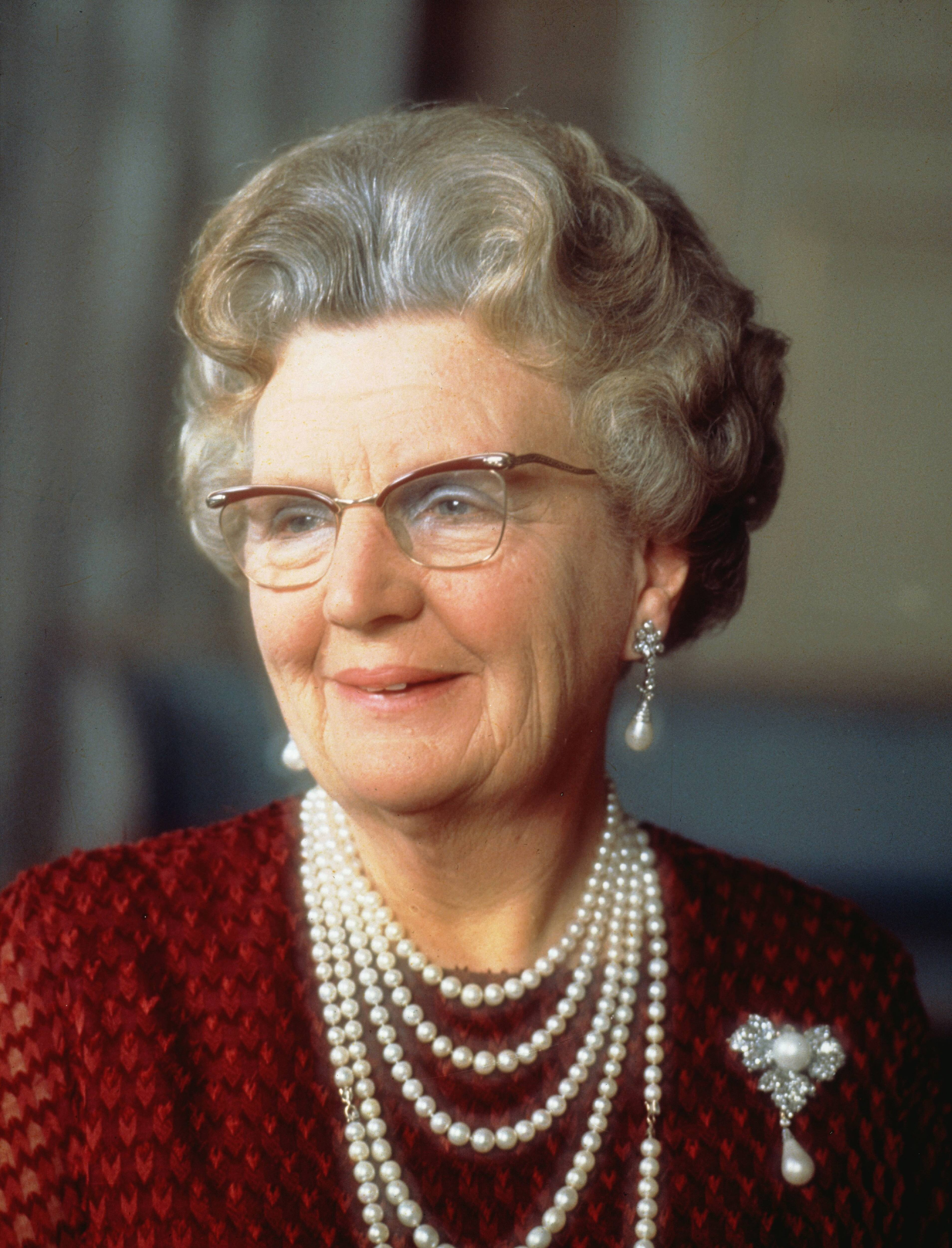
- Formal portrait, 1973

Queen of the Netherlands
- Reign: 4 September 1948 – 30 April 1980
- Inauguration: 6 September 1948
- Predecessor: Wilhelmina
- Successor: Beatrix
- Born: Princess Juliana of Orange-Nassau; 30 April 1909; Noordeinde Palace, The Hague, Netherlands
- Died: 20 March 2004 (aged 94); Soestdijk Palace, Baarn, Netherlands
- Burial: 30 March 2004; Nieuwe Kerk, Delft, Netherlands
- Spouse: Prince Bernhard of Lippe-Biesterfeld (m. 1937)
- Issue: Beatrix of the Netherlands; Princess Irene; Princess Margriet; Princess Christina
Names
- Juliana Louise Emma Marie Wilhelmina
- House: Orange-Nassau (official); Mecklenburg-Schwerin (agnatic)
- Father: Duke Henry of Mecklenburg-Schwerin
- Mother: Wilhelmina of the Netherlands

Juliana (Dutch pronunciation: [jyliˈjaːnaː]; Juliana Louise Emma Marie Wilhelmina; 30 April 1909 – 20 March 2004) was Queen of the Netherlands from 1948 until her abdication in 1980.

Juliana was the only child of Queen Wilhelmina and Duke Henry of Mecklenburg-Schwerin. She received a private education and studied international law at the University of Leiden. In 1937, she married Prince Bernhard of Lippe-Biesterfeld with whom she had four daughters: Beatrix, Irene, Margriet, and Christina. During the German invasion of the Netherlands in the Second World War, the royal family was evacuated to the United Kingdom. Juliana then relocated to Canada with her children, while Wilhelmina and Bernhard remained in Britain. The royal family returned to the Netherlands after its liberation in 1945.

Due to Wilhelmina's failing health, Juliana took over royal duties briefly in 1947 and 1948. In September 1948, Wilhelmina abdicated and Juliana ascended to the Dutch throne. Her reign saw the decolonization and independence of the Dutch East Indies and Suriname, and the creation and dissolution of the Netherlands-Indonesia Union, of which she served as head of state. Despite a series of controversies involving the royal family, Juliana remained a popular figure among the Dutch.

In April 1980, Juliana abdicated in favour of her eldest daughter, Beatrix. Upon her death in 2004 at the age of 94, she was the longest-lived former reigning monarch in the world.

== Early life and education ==
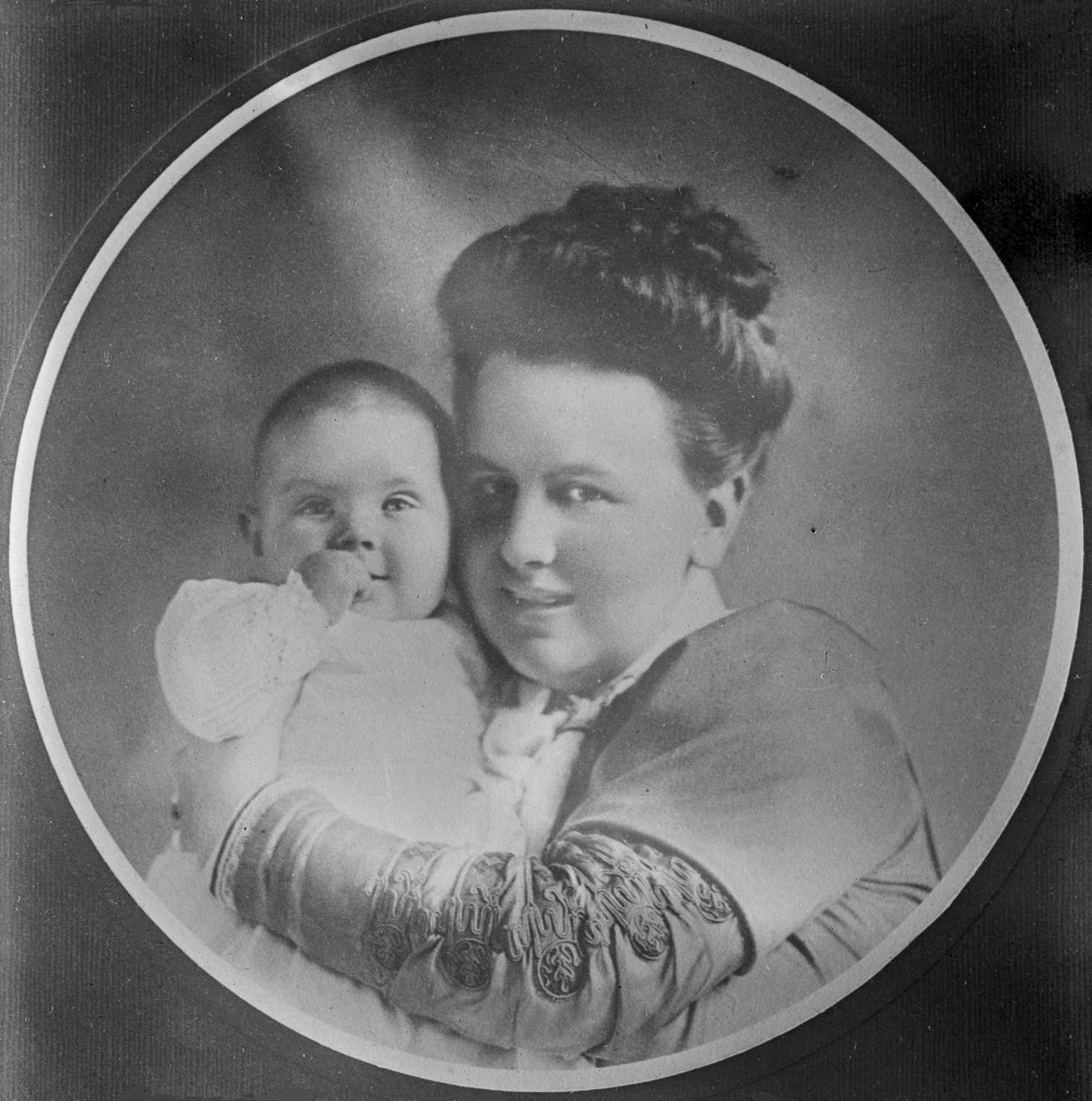
29-year-old Queen Wilhelmina with the long-awaited heir presumptive, Princess Juliana

Juliana was born on 30 April 1909 at Noordeinde Palace in The Hague, the only child of the reigning Dutch monarch, Queen Wilhelmina. Her father was Duke Henry of Mecklenburg-Schwerin. She was the first Dutch royal baby since Wilhelmina herself was born in 1880. Wilhelmina had suffered two miscarriages and had given birth to a premature and stillborn son, raising the prospect of a succession crisis.

The Queen's nearest relative was Prince Heinrich XXXII Reuss of Köstritz, whose close ties to Germany made him unpopular in the Netherlands, leading to concerns that if Wilhelmina died without an heir, he would turn the Netherlands into a puppet state of Germany. Juliana's birth thus assured the royal family's survival. Her mother suffered two further miscarriages after her birth, leaving Juliana as the royal couple's only child. According to several sources Juliana was happy to be an only child because that meant she did not have to fight for attention.

Juliana spent her childhood at Het Loo Palace in Apeldoorn, and at Noordeinde Palace and Huis ten Bosch Palace in The Hague. A small school class was formed at Noordeinde Palace on the advice of the educator Jan Ligthart so that, from the age of six, the Princess could receive her primary education with children of her own age. These children were Baroness Elise Bentinck, Baroness Elisabeth van Hardenbroek and Jonkvrouwe Miek (Mary) de Jonge.

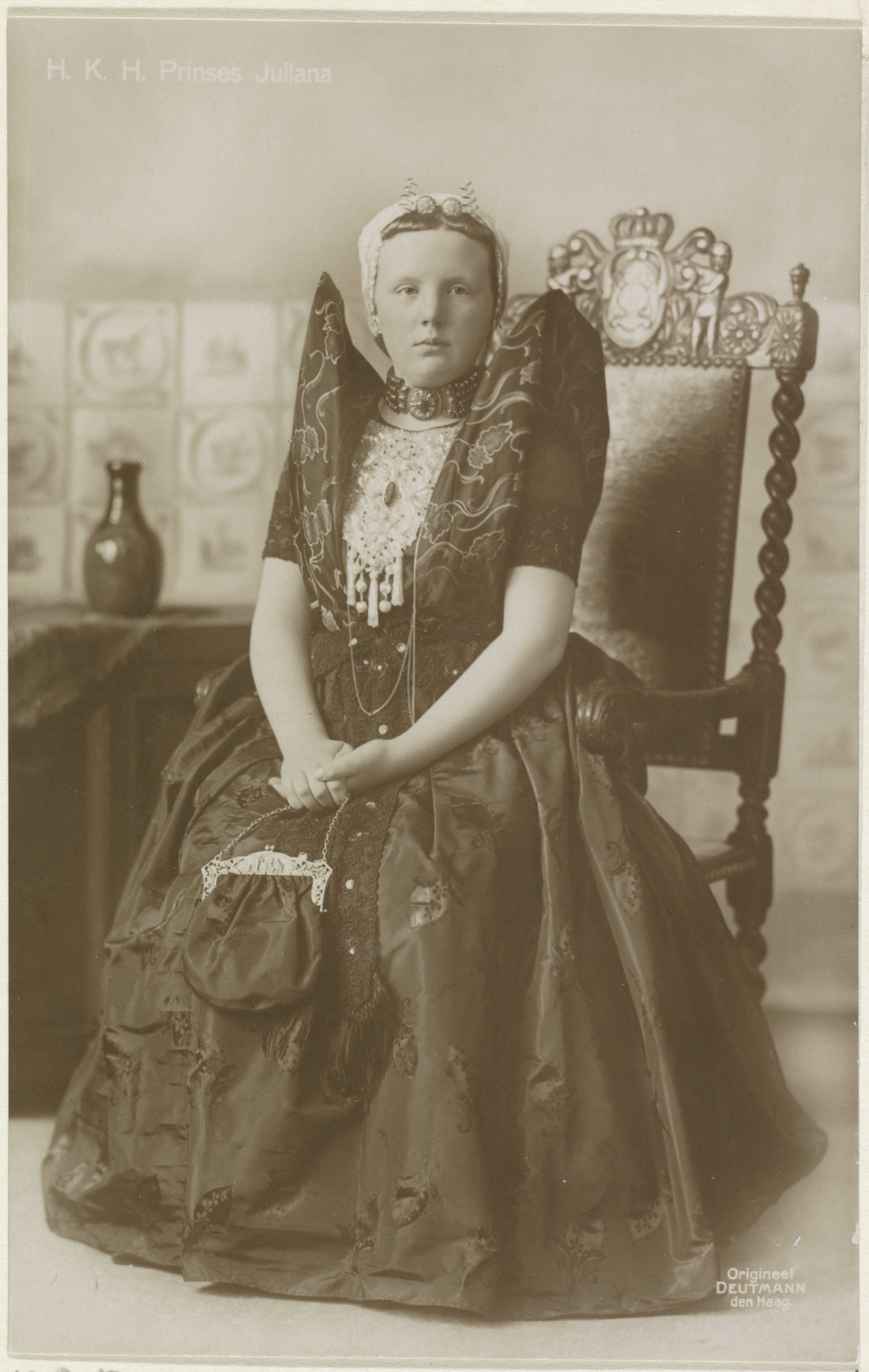
Princess Juliana in an Axel costume in 1922

As the Dutch constitution specified that Princess Juliana should be ready to succeed to the throne by the age of eighteen, her education proceeded at a faster pace than that of most children. After five years of primary education, the Princess received her secondary education (to pre-university level) from private tutors.

On 30 April 1927, Princess Juliana celebrated her eighteenth birthday. Under the constitution, she had officially come of age and was entitled to assume the royal prerogative, if necessary. Two days later her mother installed her in the "Raad van State" ("Council of State").

In the same year, the Princess enrolled as a student at the University of Leiden. In her first years at university, she attended lectures in sociology, jurisprudence, economics, history of religion, parliamentary history, and constitutional law. In the course of her studies, she also attended lectures on the cultures of Suriname and the Netherlands Antilles, international affairs, international law, history, and European law. She graduated from the university in 1930 with a bachelor's degree in international law. She was taught Greek literature by Sophia Antoniadis, the university's first female professor.

== Marriage ==
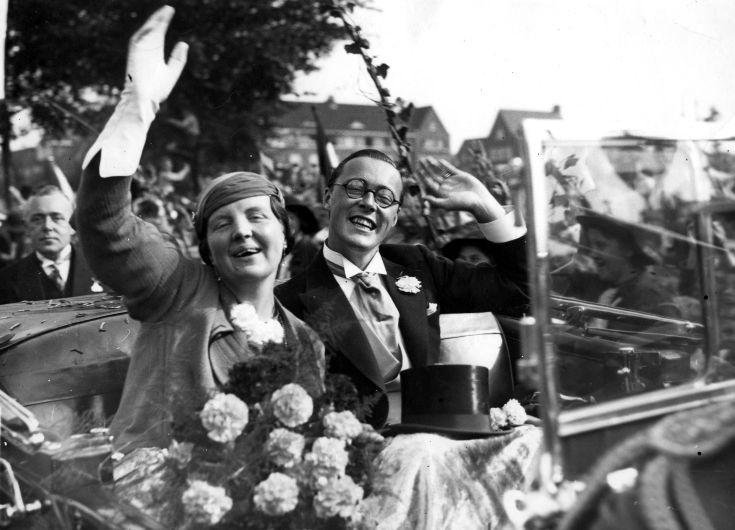
Princess Juliana and Prince Bernhard celebrate their engagement announcement in Amsterdam

In the 1930s, Queen Wilhelmina began a search for a suitable husband for her daughter. At the time, the House of Orange-Nassau was one of the most strictly religious royal families in the world, and it was very difficult to find a Protestant prince who suited their standards. Princes from the United Kingdom and Sweden were "vetted" but either declined or were rejected by the princess.

At the 1936 Winter Olympics in Bavaria, she met Prince Bernhard of Lippe-Biesterfeld, a young German Prince who was her 7th cousin, as both descended from Lebrecht, Prince of Anhalt-Zeitz-Hoym. His rank and religion were suitable; so Princess Juliana's royal engagement was arranged by her mother. Princess Juliana fell deeply in love with her fiancé, a love that was to last a lifetime and that withstood separation during the war and Bernhard's extramarital affairs and illegitimate children. Queen Wilhelmina, by then the richest woman in the world, left nothing to chance. Wilhelmina had her lawyers draw up a prenuptial agreement that specified exactly what the German-born prince could and could not do, and what money he would receive from the royal estate. The couple's engagement was announced on 8 September 1936.

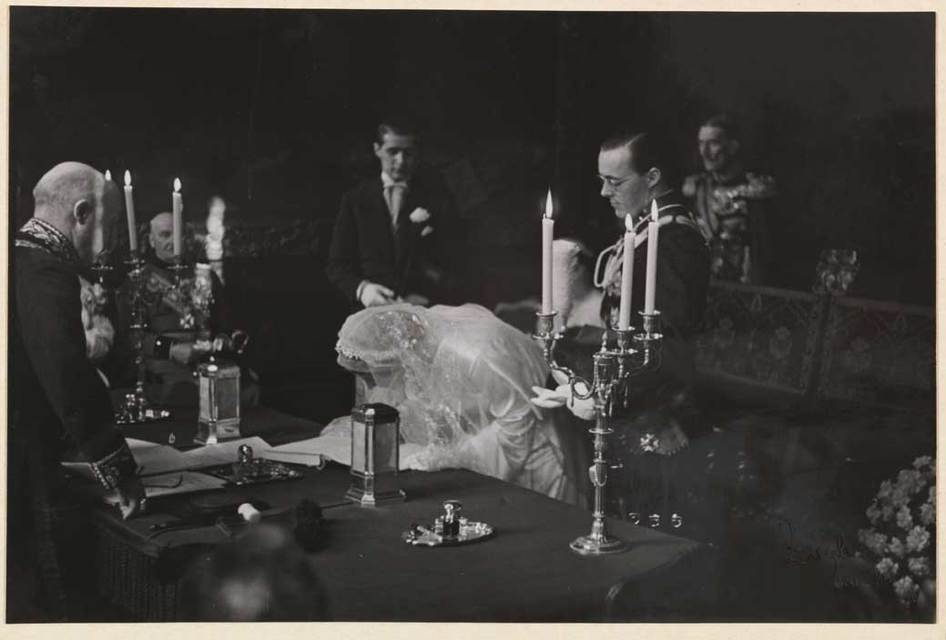
Queen Juliana signing the marriage register

The wedding announcement divided a country that mistrusted Germany under Adolf Hitler. Prior to the wedding, on 24 November 1936, Prince Bernhard was granted Dutch citizenship and changed the spelling of his names from German to Dutch. They married in The Hague on 7 January 1937, the date on which Princess Juliana's grandparents, King William III and Queen Emma, had married fifty-eight years earlier. The civil ceremony was held in the Town Hall of The Hague and the marriage was blessed in the Great Church (St. Jacobskerk), also located in The Hague. Juliana's chosen bridesmaids were either relatives or family friends. These included Duchess Woizlawa Feodora of Mecklenburg-Schwerin (her first cousin), Duchess Thyra of Mecklenburg-Schwerin (her second cousin), Grand Duchess Kira Kirillovna of Russia (her first cousin once removed), Princess Sophie of Saxe-Weimar-Eisenach (her second cousin), and two of Bernhard's first cousins, Princess Sieglinde of Lippe and Princess Elisabeth of Lippe.

A wedding gift was the royal yacht, Piet Hein. The young couple moved into Soestdijk Palace in Baarn.

The first of their four daughters, Princess Beatrix, was born on 31 January 1938, followed by Princess Irene on 5 August 1939.

== Canadian exile ==
Princess Juliana and Prince Bernhard giving an interview for Radio Oranje in 1941

On 12 May 1940, during the invasion of the Netherlands by Germany in the Second World War, Prince Bernhard and Princess Juliana were evacuated to the United Kingdom to be followed the next day by Queen Wilhelmina and the Dutch Government, who set up a government in exile. The princess remained there for a month before taking the children to Ottawa, the capital of Canada, where she resided at Stornoway in the suburb of Rockcliffe Park. Her mother and husband remained in Britain with the Dutch government-in-exile.

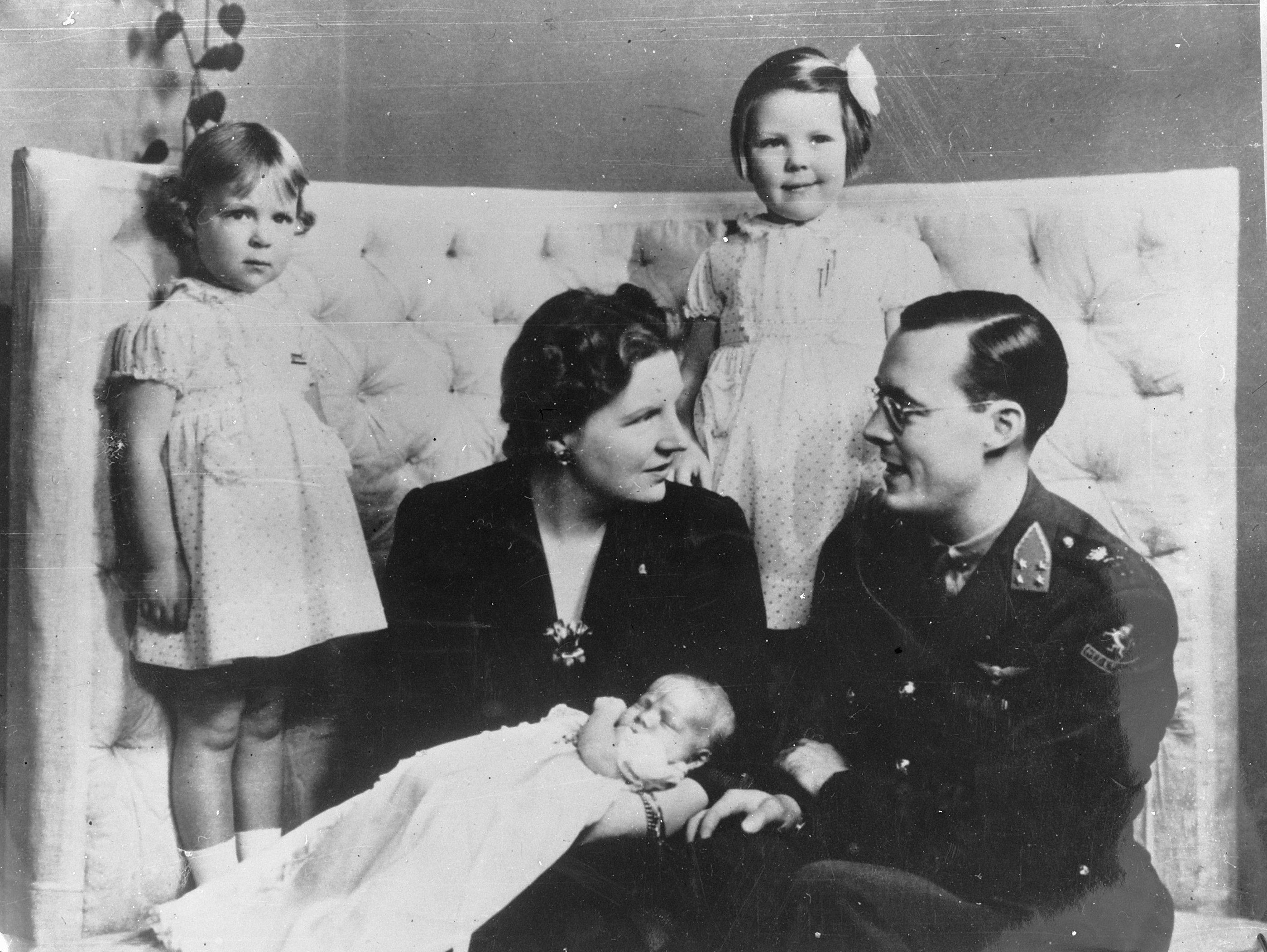
Juliana with her husband and daughters in Ottawa in 1943

When her third child, Princess Margriet, was born on 19 January 1943, Governor General Lord Athlone granted royal assent to a special law declaring Princess Juliana's rooms at the Ottawa Civic Hospital to be extraterritorial in order that the infant would have exclusively Dutch, not dual nationality. Had these arrangements not been made, Princess Margriet would not be in the line of succession. The Canadian government flew the Dutch tricolour flag on parliament's Peace Tower while its carillon rang out with Dutch music at the news of Princess Margriet's birth. Prince Bernhard, who had remained in London to assist his mother in law Queen Wilhelmina and the government with operating in exile, was able to visit his family in Canada and be there for Margriet's birth. Princess Juliana's genuine warmth and the gestures of her Canadian hosts created a lasting bond, which was reinforced when Canadian soldiers fought and died by the thousands in 1944 and 1945 to liberate the Netherlands from the Nazis. She returned with Queen Wilhelmina by a military transport plane to the liberated part of the Netherlands on 2 May 1945, rushing to Breda to set up a temporary Dutch government. Once home, she expressed her gratitude to Canada by sending the city of Ottawa 100,000 tulip bulbs. Juliana erected a wooden lectern and brass plaque which is dedicated in thanks to the St. Andrew's Presbyterian Church (Ottawa) for their hospitality during her residence in Ottawa.

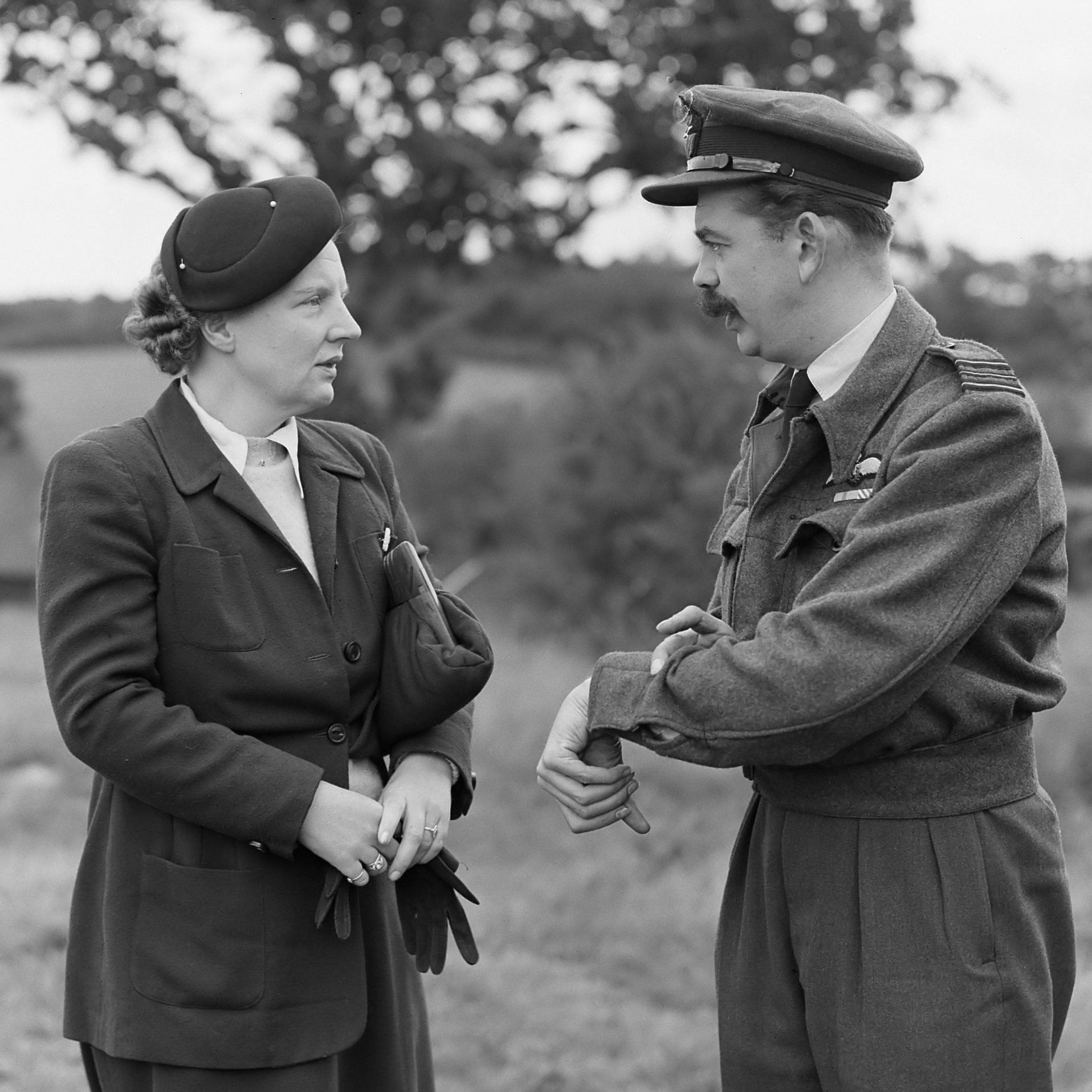
Juliana meets RAF pilot Kees van Eendenburg at Deanland in 1944

On 24 June 1945, she sailed on the RMS Queen Elizabeth from Gourock, Scotland, to the United States, listing her last permanent residence as London, England. The following year (1946), Juliana donated another 20,500 bulbs, with the request that a portion of these be planted at the grounds of the Ottawa Civic Hospital where she had given birth to Margriet. At the same time, she promised Ottawa an annual gift of tulips during her lifetime to show her lasting appreciation for Canada's war-time hospitality. Each year Ottawa hosts the Canadian Tulip Festival in celebration of this gift.

On 2 May 1945, Princess Juliana was returned with her mother to Dutch soil. Initially they lived in temporary quarters at Anneville just south of Breda. Juliana took part in the post-war relief operation for the people in the northern part of the country who had suffered through starvation during the Hunger Winter of 1944–1945, which had taken the lives of many of her countrymen. She was very active as the president of the Dutch Red Cross and worked closely with the National Reconstruction organization. Her down-to-earth manner endeared her to her people so much that a majority of the Dutch people would soon want Queen Wilhelmina to abdicate in favour of her daughter. In the spring of 1946 Princess Juliana and Prince Bernhard visited the countries that had helped the Netherlands during the occupation.

During her pregnancy with her last child, Marijke Christina, Princess Juliana contracted rubella. The girl was born in 1947 with cataracts in both eyes and was soon diagnosed as almost totally blind in one eye and severely limited in the other. Despite her blindness, Christina, as she was called, was a happy and gifted child with a talent for languages and an ear for music. Over time, and with advances in medical technology, her eyesight did improve such that with thick glasses, she could attend school and even ride a bicycle. However, before that happened, her mother, the Princess, clinging to any thread that offered some hope for a cure, came under the strong influence of Greet Hofmans, a faith healer with heterodox beliefs, who was considered by "her many detractors" to be a sham.

== Reign ==
=== Regency and early reign ===
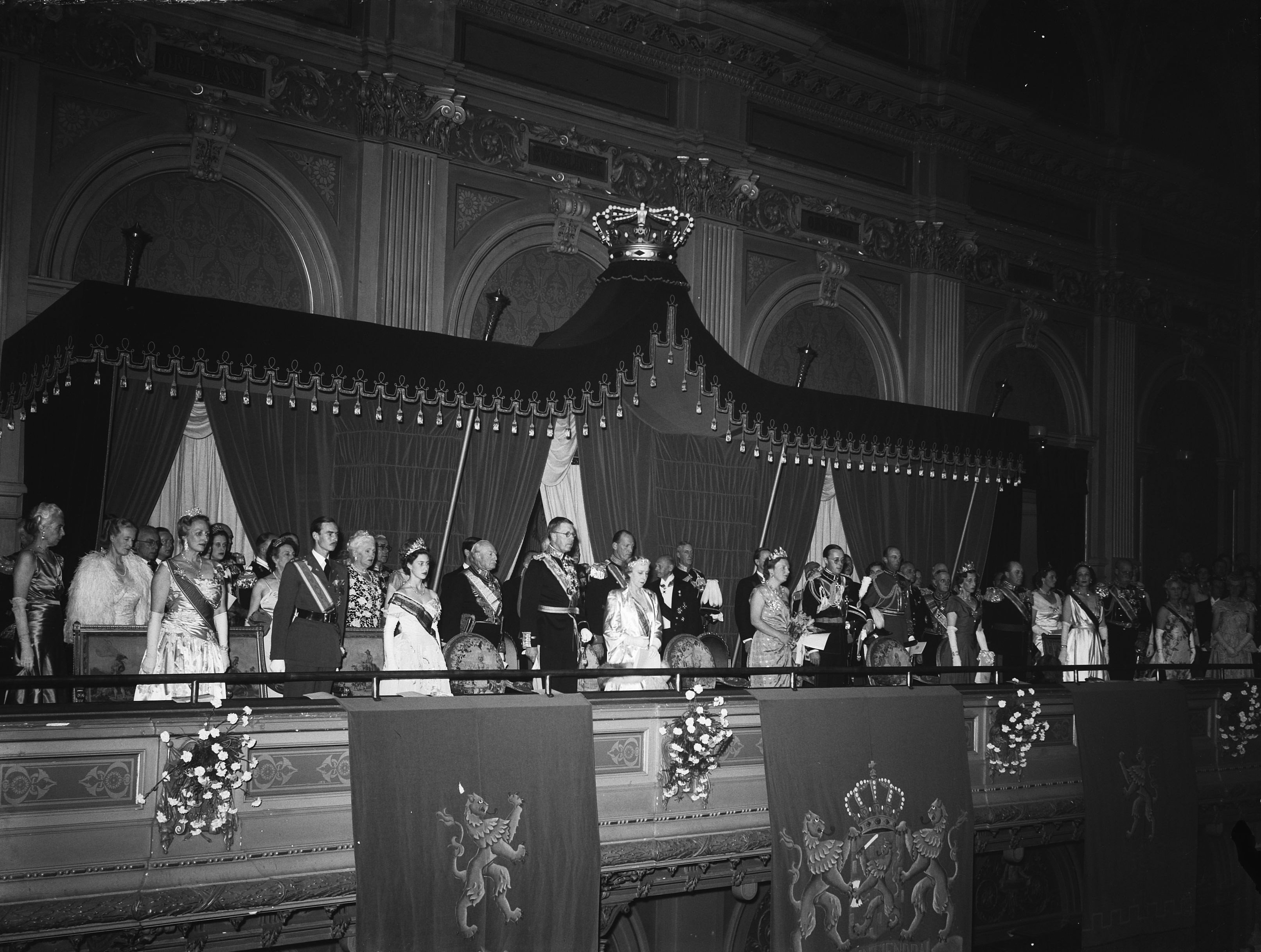
Celebration of Queen Juliana's inauguration, 1948

Wilhelmina's increasingly precarious health made it increasingly difficult for her to perform her duties. Juliana was forced to take over as regent from 14 October to 1 December 1947. Wilhelmina seriously considered abdicating in favour of Juliana at the end of 1947, but Juliana urged her mother to stay on the throne so she could celebrate her golden jubilee in 1948. However, Wilhelmina was forced by further health problems to relinquish her royal duties to Juliana once again on 4 May 1948.

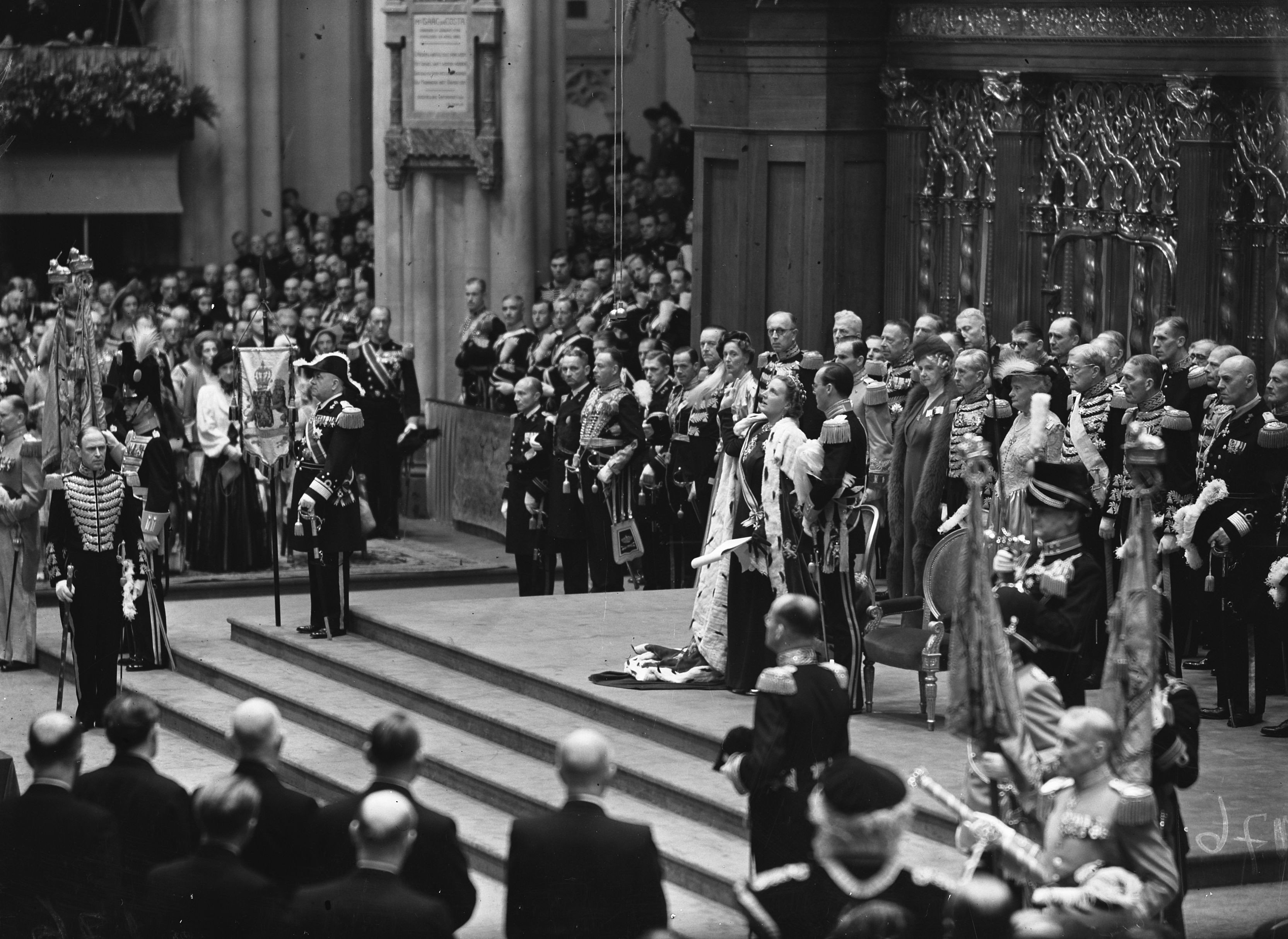
Juliana swearing the royal oath during her Inhuldiging

The independence of Indonesia, which saw more than 150,000 Dutch troops stationed there as decolonization force, was regarded as an economic disaster for the Netherlands. With the certain loss of the prized colony, the queen announced her intention to abdicate, doing so on 4 September 1948. Two days later, with the eyes of the world upon her, Juliana was sworn in and inaugurated as monarch during a joint session of the States General at a ceremony held in the Nieuwe Kerk in Amsterdam, becoming the 12th member of the House of Orange to rule the Netherlands.

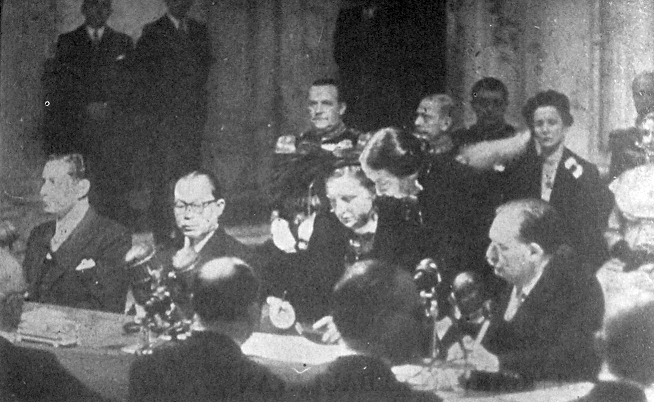
Queen Juliana signing Indonesian sovereignty papers, 1949

On 27 December 1949 at Dam Palace in Amsterdam, Queen Juliana signed the papers that recognised Indonesian sovereignty over the former Dutch colony. She became Hoofd der Unie (Head of the Union) of the Netherlands-Indonesian Union (1949–1956). On 15 December 1954, the Queen announced that the nation's Caribbean possessions of the Netherlands Antilles and Suriname were to be reconstituted as constituent countries of the Kingdom of the Netherlands, making them equal partners with the mainland.

The near-blindness of her daughter Christina and the increasing influence of Hofmans, who had moved into a royal palace, severely affected the queen's marital relationship. Over the next few years, the controversy surrounding the faith healer, at first kept out of the Dutch media, erupted into a national debate over the competency of the queen. However, the debate subsided in part due to Juliana's efforts to connect with her people. She often appeared in public dressed like any ordinary Dutch woman, and preferred to be addressed as "Mevrouw" (Dutch for "Mrs.") rather than her formal title of "majesty". She also began riding a bicycle for exercise and fresh air.

Although the bicycle and the down-to-earth manners suggest a simple life style, the Dutch royal court of the 1950s and 1960s was still an opulent affair with chamberlains in magnificent uniforms, gilded state coaches, visits to towns in open carriages and lavish entertaining in the huge palaces. At the same time the queen began visiting the citizens of the nearby towns and, unannounced, would drop in on social institutions and schools like her mother before her insisting on seeing reality rather than a prepared show. On the international stage, Queen Juliana was interested in the problems of developing countries, the refugee problem, and particularly child welfare in developing countries. Together with her daughters Beatrix and Irene, she took part in the ship tour organized by Queen Frederica and her husband King Paul of Greece in 1954, which became known as the "Cruise of the Kings" and was attended by over 100 royals from all over Europe. Francis of Bavaria, a participant, reports in his memoirs the anecdote that the queens of Greece, the Netherlands and Italy went ashore in a harbor in the middle of a crowd of nephews and nieces, and a waiting journalist called out to them: "What is the purpose of this trip?", whereupon Queen Juliana replied with a friendly smile: "Oh, you know, this is our union's company outing."

=== Crises and recovery ===
On the night of 31 January 1953, the Netherlands was hit by the most destructive storm in more than five hundred years. Thirty breaches of dunes and dikes occurred and many towns were swept away by twelve-foot storm surges. More than 1800 people drowned and tens of thousands were trapped by the floodwaters. Dressed in boots and an old coat, Queen Juliana waded through water and slopped through deep mud all over the devastated areas to bring desperate people food and clothing. Showing compassion and concern, reassuring the people, her tireless efforts would permanently endear her to the citizens of the Netherlands.

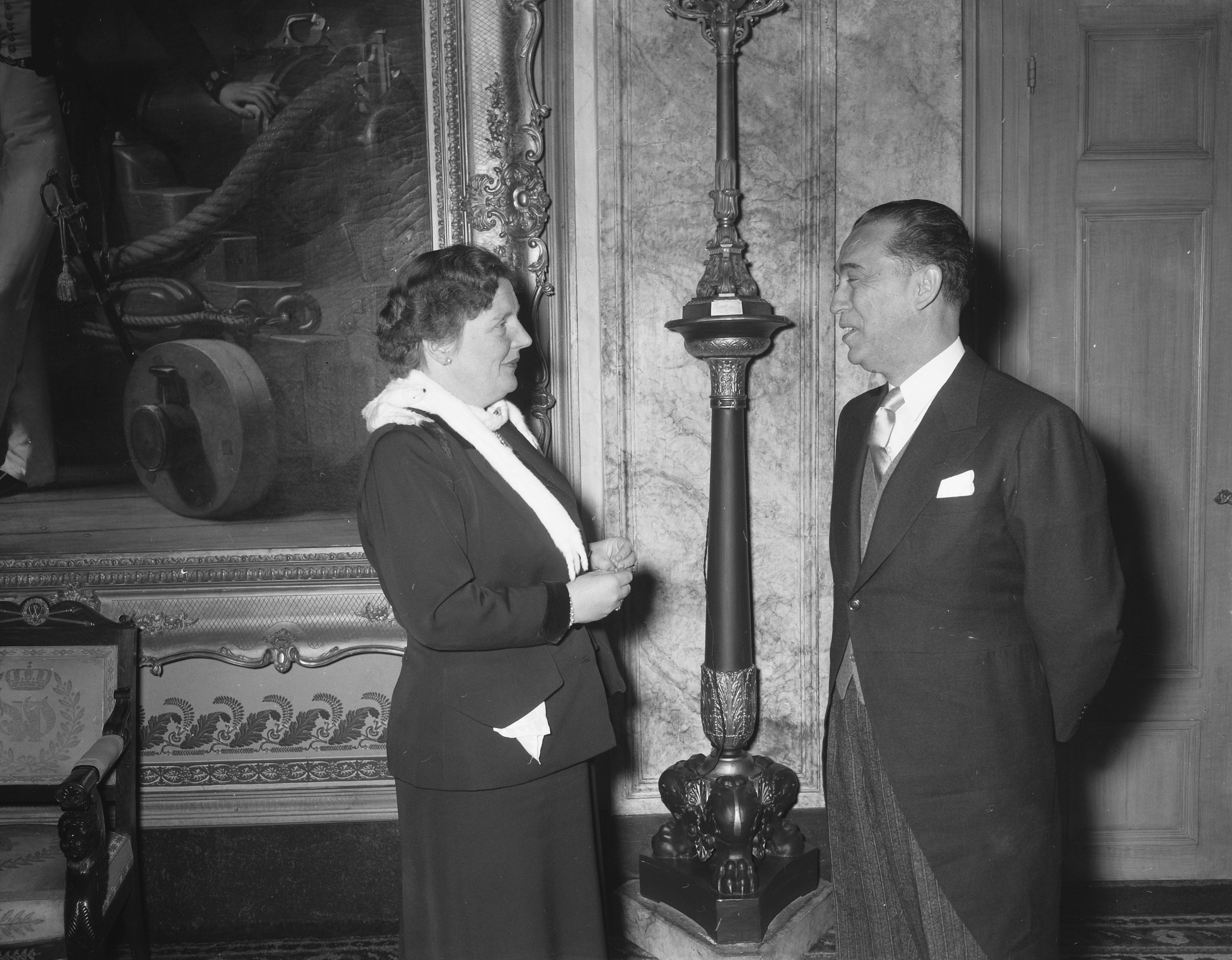
Queen Juliana with Brazilian President Juscelino Kubitschek at Soestdijk Palace, 1956

In 1956, the influence of Hofmans on Juliana's political views almost brought down the monarchy in a constitutional crisis; this caused the court and the royal family to split into a "Bernhard faction", set on removing a queen considered a religious fanatic and a threat to NATO, and the queen's pious and pacifist courtiers. The crisis was resolved, when Hofmans was banished from the court and Juliana's supporters were sacked or pensioned. Prince Bernhard planned to divorce his wife but decided against it when he, as he told an American journalist, "found out that the woman still loved him".

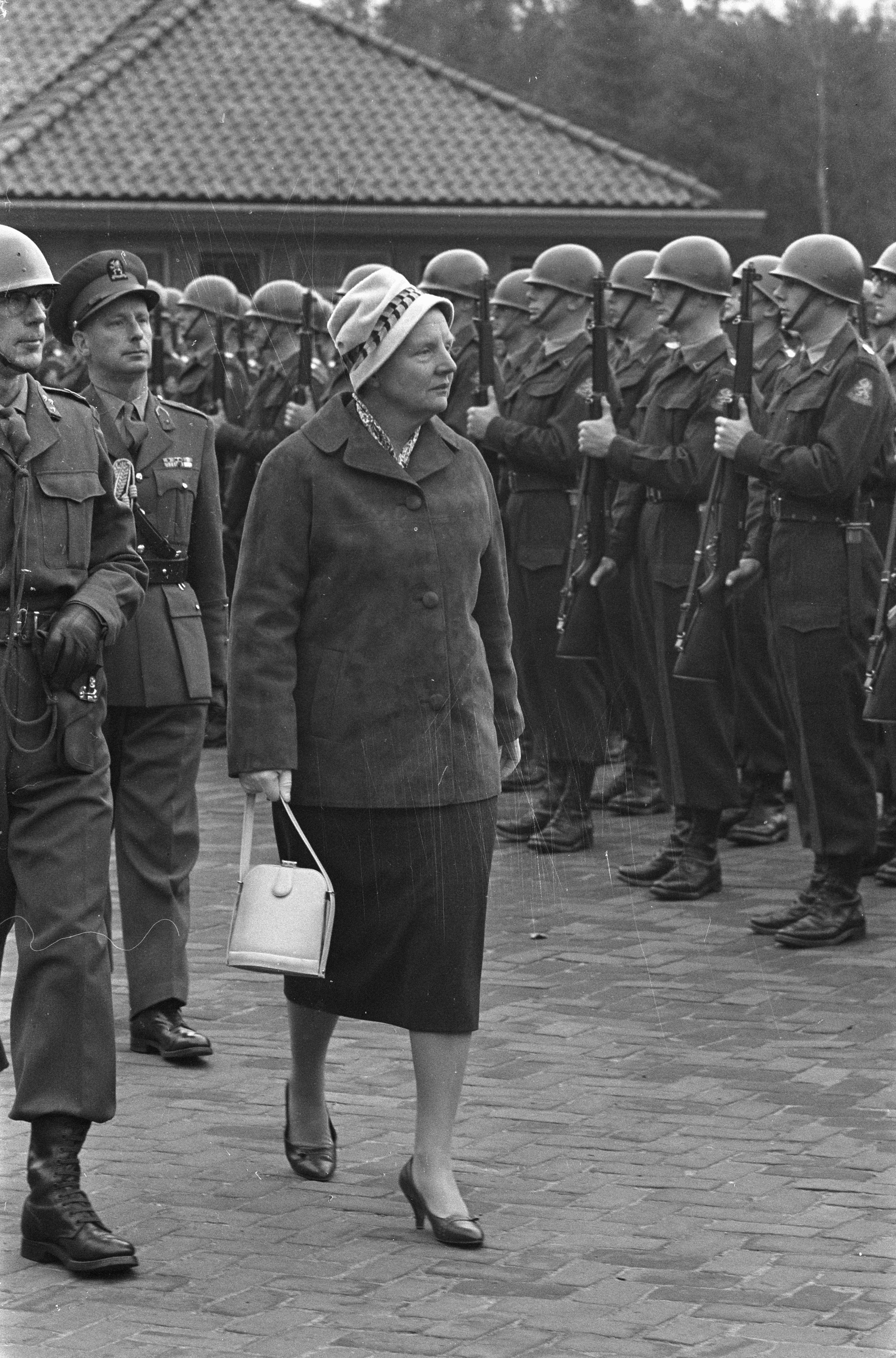
Queen Juliana inspecting the troops, 1959

Queen Juliana faced another crisis among her Protestant citizens in 1963, when her second daughter Irene secretly converted to Roman Catholicism and, without government approval, on 29 April 1964 married Prince Carlos Hugo of Bourbon, Duke of Parma, a claimant to the Spanish throne and also a leader in Spain's Carlist party. Given the history of the Dutch struggle for independence from Roman Catholic Spain, and with fascist German oppression still fresh in the minds of the Dutch people, the events leading to the marriage were played out in all the newspapers and a storm of hostility erupted against the monarchy for allowing it to happen—a matter so serious that the queen's abdication became a real possibility. She survived, however, thanks to the underlying devotion she had earned over the years.

Another crisis developed as a result of the announcement in July 1965 of the engagement of Princess Beatrix, heir to the throne, to German diplomat Claus von Amsberg. The future husband of the future queen had been a member of the Nazi Wehrmacht and the Hitler Youth movement. Many angry Dutch citizens demonstrated in the streets, and held rallies and marches against the "traitorous" affair. While this time there were no calls for the queen's abdication—because the true object of the people's wrath, Princess Beatrix, would then be queen—they did start to question the value of having a monarchy at all. After attempting to have the marriage cancelled, Queen Juliana acquiesced and the marriage took place under a continued storm of protest; an almost certain attitude pervaded the country that Princess Beatrix might be the last member of the House of Orange to ever reign in the Netherlands. Despite all these difficulties, Queen Juliana's personal popularity suffered only temporarily.

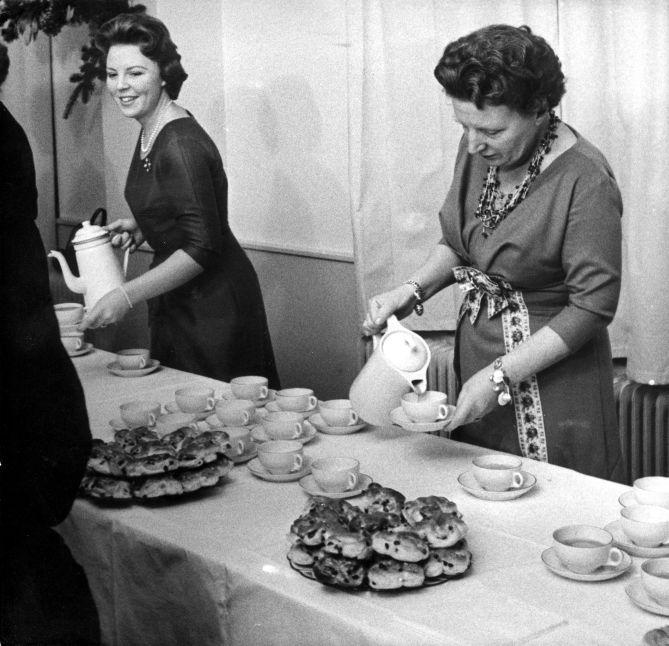
Queen Juliana and Princess Beatrix serving cocoa and buns to their staff on Christmas 1960

The queen was noted for her courtesy and kindness. In May 1959, for example, Polish-American ufologist George Adamski received a letter from the head of the Dutch Unidentified Flying Objects Society, Rey d'Aquilla, informing him that she had been contacted by Queen Juliana's palace and "that the Queen would like to receive you". Adamski informed a London newspaper about the invitation, which prompted the court and cabinet to request that the queen cancel her meeting with Adamski, but the queen went ahead with the meeting, saying that "A hostess cannot slam the door in the face of her guests." After the meeting, Dutch Aeronautical Association president Cornelis Kolff said: "The Queen showed an extraordinary interest in the whole subject." The Dutch press put it more straightforwardly. According to Time magazine, newspaper de Volkskrant said: "The Dutch press could hardly be accused of concealing the facts last week. Once again, Queen Juliana's weakness for the preternatural had landed her back in the headlines: she had invited to the palace a crackpot from California who numbered among his friends men from Mars, Venus and other solar-system suburbs."

An event in April 1967, helped by an improving Dutch economy, brought an overnight revitalization of the royal family: the first male heir to the Dutch throne in 116 years, Willem-Alexander, was born to Princess Beatrix. This time, the demonstrations in the street were of love and enthusiasm.

=== Later reign ===
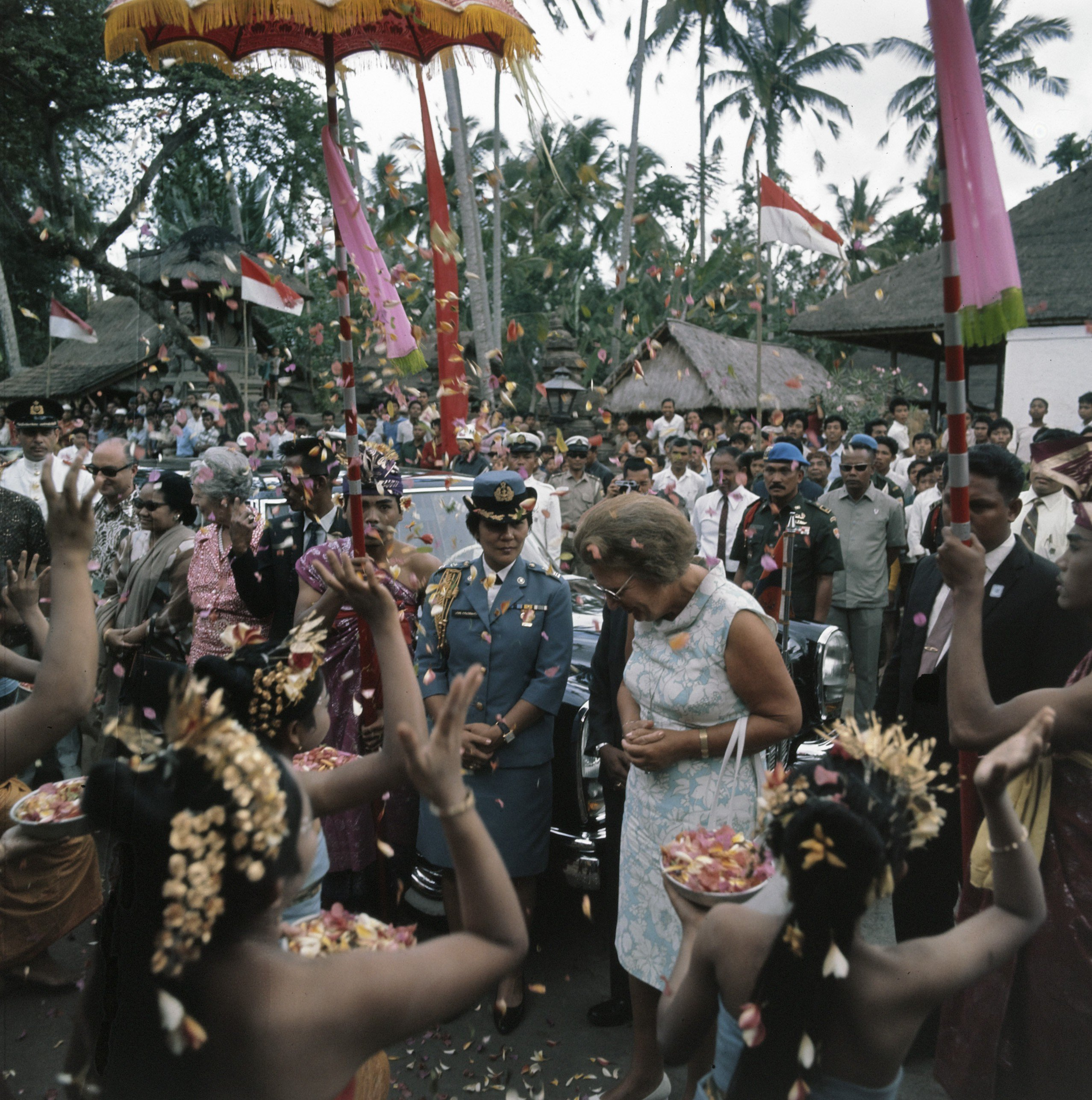
Reception of Queen Juliana in Bali, September 1971. On the left the ambassador's wife, Mrs. Scheltema. In the middle adjutant Louise Elisabeth Coldenhoff of the Indonesian Navy

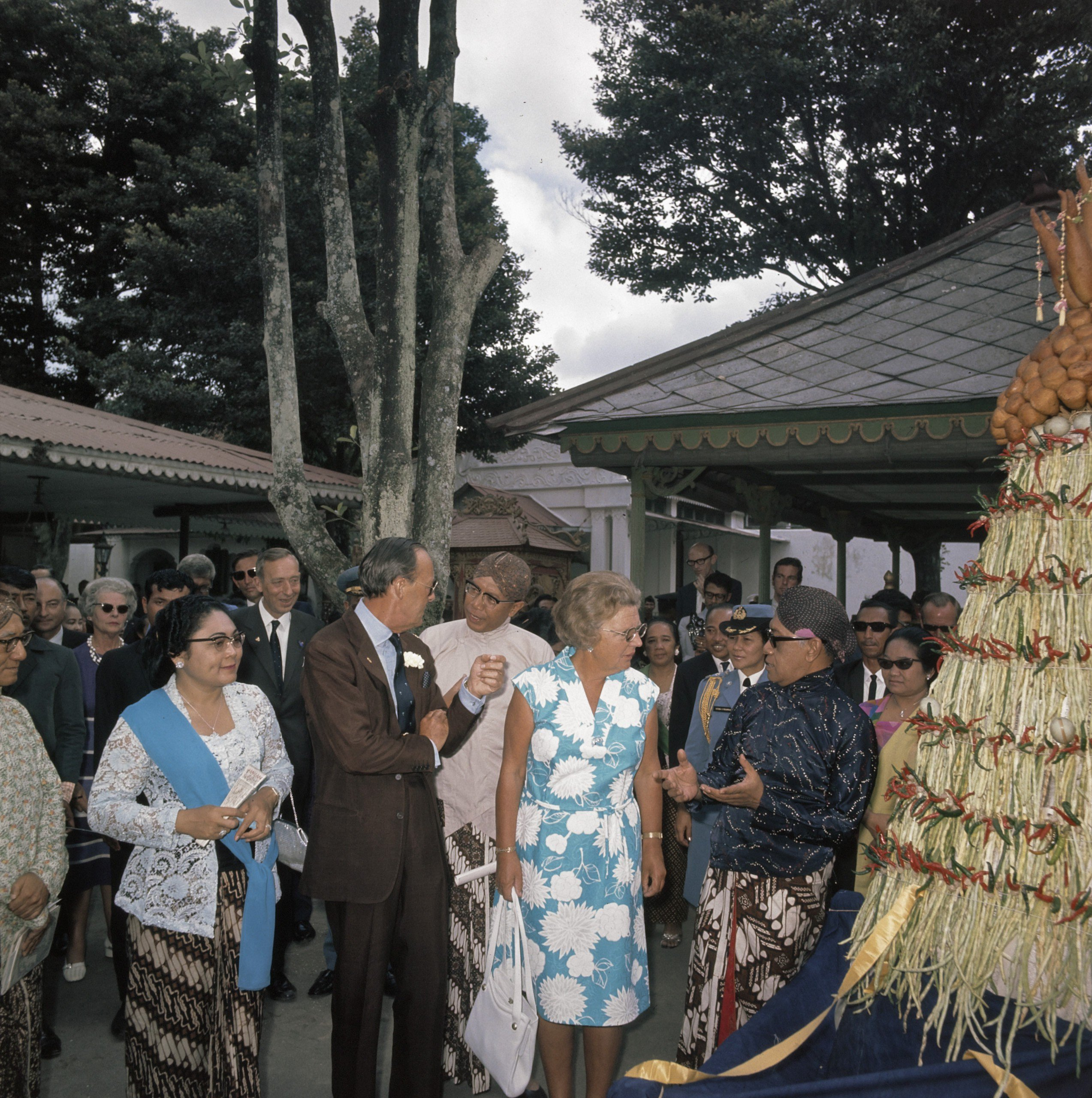
Queen Juliana and Prince Bernhard met with Hamengkubuwono IX during her visit to Yogyakarta, August 1971

In the spring of 1975, members of the Free South Moluccan Youths were caught conspiring to steal a heavy truck and ram the gates of Soestdijk Palace to kidnap the Queen. Ten members of the group in a vehicle full of firearms were arrested. Their alleged aim was to force the Dutch government to recognize the Republik Maluku Selatan (RMS) as an independent state and try to make the Indonesian government do the same. Seventeen South Moluccan youngsters were tried and convicted and sentenced to up to six years imprisonment. This was one of a series of actions for this cause during the 1970s, including the 1975 Dutch train hijacking, the 1975 Indonesian consulate hostage crisis, the 1977 Dutch train hijacking, the 1977 Dutch school hostage crisis, and the 1978 Dutch province hall hostage crisis.

On 25 November 1975, Suriname seceded from the Dutch Kingdom and became independent. Representing the Queen at the independence ceremony in the Surinamese capital, Paramaribo, were the heir presumptive Princess Beatrix, and her husband Prince Claus.

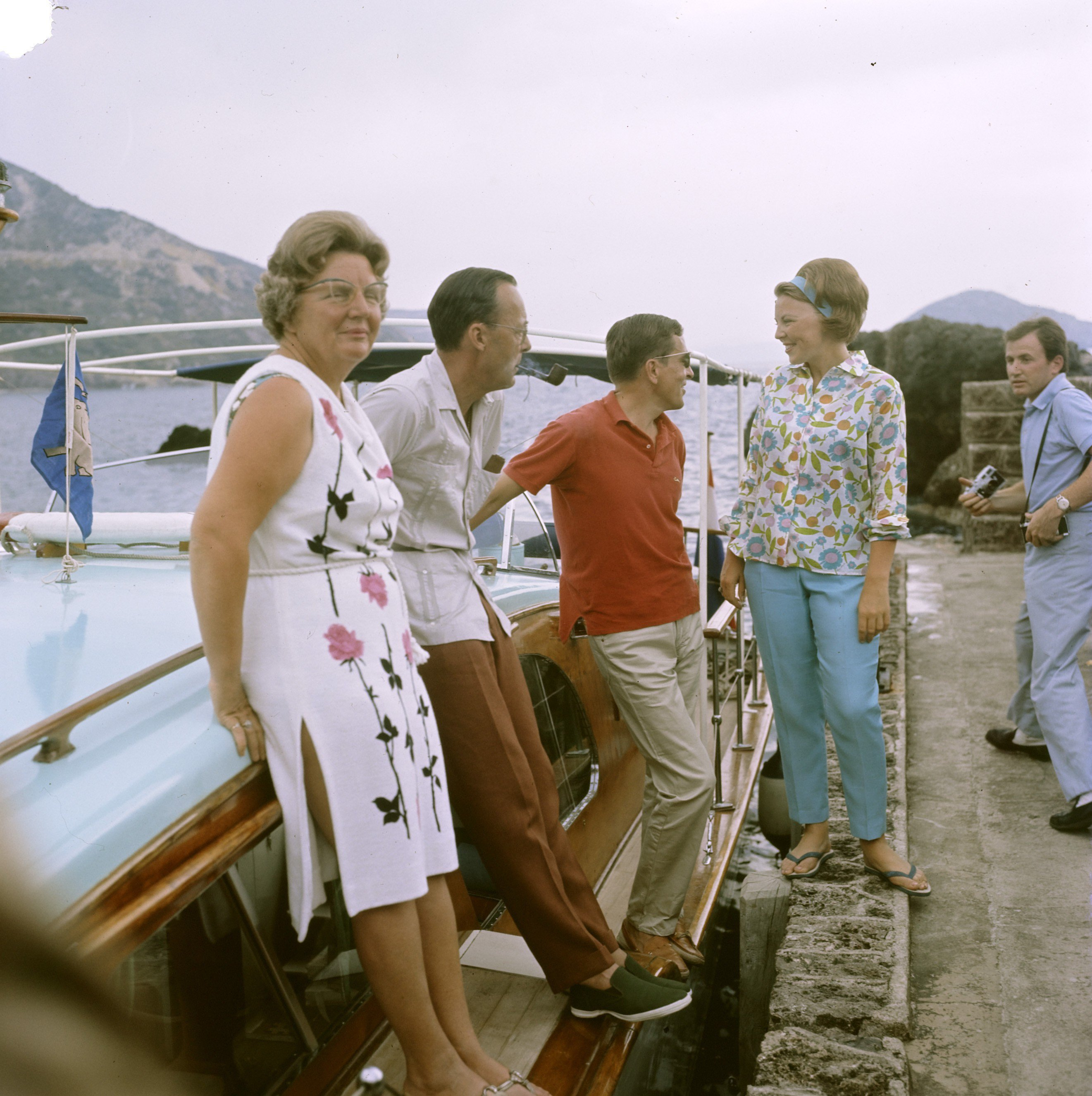
Queen Juliana, Prince Bernhard, Princess Beatrix and Prince Claus on holiday in Porto Ercole.

Scandal rocked the royal family again in 1976, when it was revealed that Prince Bernhard had accepted a $1.1 million USD bribe from U.S. defence contractor Lockheed Corporation to influence the Dutch government's purchase of fighter aircraft in what became known as the Lockheed Scandal.

Prime Minister Joop den Uyl ordered an inquiry into the affair, while Prince Bernhard refused to answer reporters' questions, stating: "I am above such things." Rather than calling on the Queen to abdicate, the Dutch people were this time fearful that their beloved Juliana might abdicate out of shame or because of a criminal prosecution conducted in her name against her consort.

On 26 August 1976, a censored and toned-down yet devastating report on Prince Bernhard's activities was released to a shocked Dutch public. The prince resigned his various high-profile positions as a lieutenant admiral, a general, and an Inspector General of the Armed Forces. He resigned from his positions on the boards of many businesses, charities, the World Wildlife Fund, and other institutions. The prince also accepted that he would have to give up wearing his beloved uniforms. In return, the States-General accepted that there was to be no criminal prosecution.

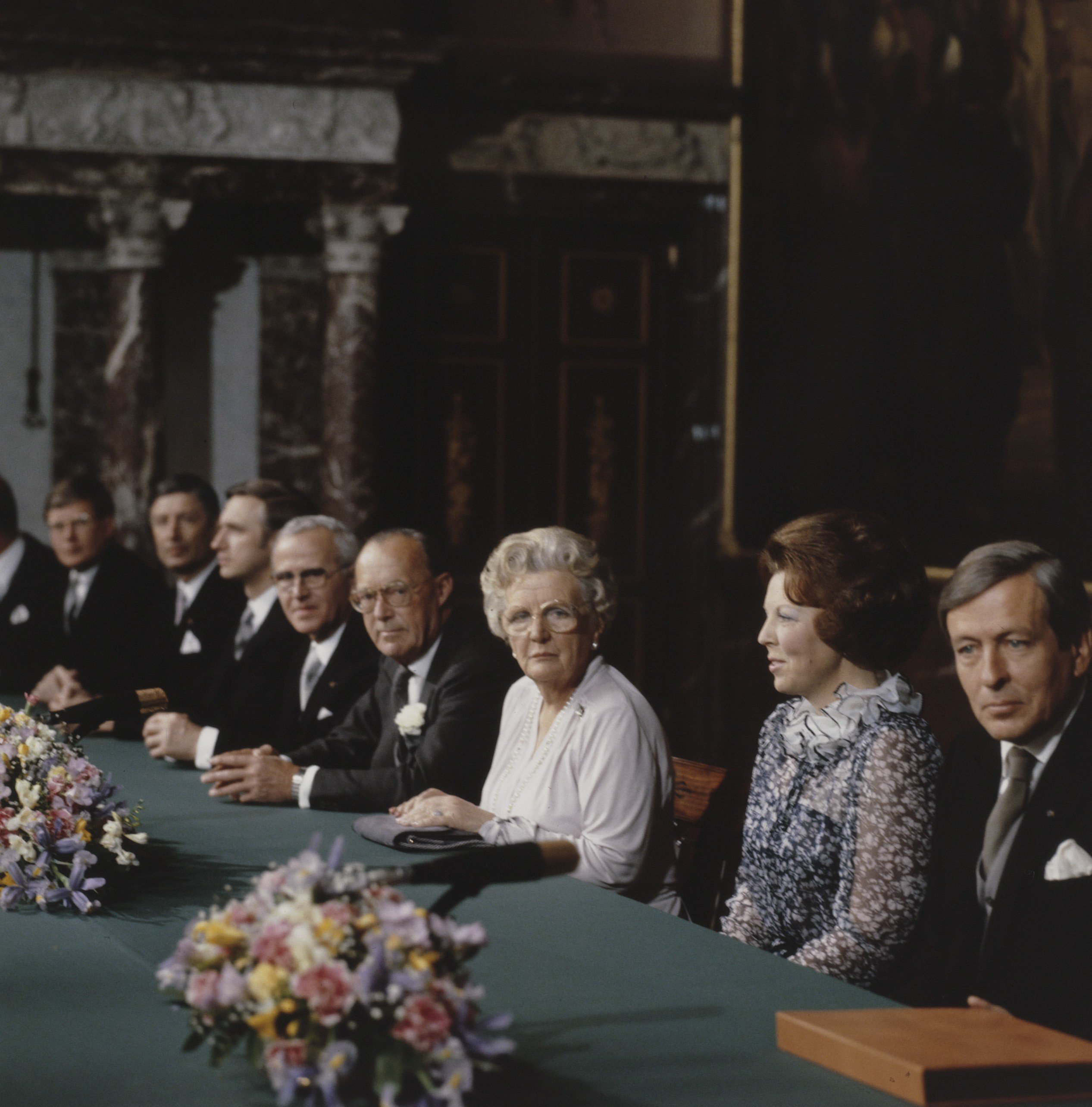
Queen Juliana on the day of her abdication, 1980

On her Silver Jubilee in 1973, Queen Juliana donated all of the money that had been raised by the National Silver Jubilee Committee to organizations for children in need throughout the world. She donated the gift from the nation which she received on her seventieth birthday, in 1979, to the "International Year of the Child". As a reigning European monarch, she was given supernumerary membership of the British Order of the Garter as the 922nd inductee, with the rank of Stranger Lady Companion, in 1958.

On 30 April 1980, her 71st birthday, Queen Juliana abdicated and her eldest daughter succeeded her. Juliana remained active in numerous charitable causes until well into her eighties.

Queen Juliana was very attached to Monte Argentario, in Tuscany, a favorite place for the Dutch royal family for their summer holidays for more than 40 years.

== Illness and death ==
Video of Juliana's funeral procession, 2004

From the mid-1990s, Juliana's health declined as she suffered the progressive onset of dementia. Juliana did not appear in public after this time. At the order of the Royal Family's doctors, Juliana was placed under 24-hour care. Prince Bernhard said in a television interview in 2001 that the former Queen was no longer able to recognise her family and that she had been suffering from Alzheimer's disease for several years.

Juliana died in her sleep at 5:50 a.m. on 20 March 2004 at the age of 94, at Soestdijk Palace in Baarn, from complications of pneumonia, seventy years to the day after her grandmother, Queen Emma. She was embalmed, unlike her mother Wilhelmina, who chose not to be, and on 30 March 2004 interred beside her mother in the royal vaults under the Nieuwe Kerk in Delft. The memorial service made her ecumenical and often highly personal views on matters of religion public. The late Princess, a Pastor said in her sermon, was interested in all religions and in reincarnation. Juliana's husband Prince Bernhard died about nine months later aged 93, on 1 December 2004; his remains were placed next to hers.

In 2009, an exhibition of portraits of Juliana, and objects from her life, was held at the Het Loo Palace to mark the centenary of her birth.

== Titles, styles, and arms ==
Juliana's full title and style as an unmarried woman was: Her Royal Highness Princess Juliana Louisa Emma Marie Wilhelmina of the Netherlands, Princess of Orange-Nassau, Duchess of Mecklenburg, etc.

Her mother issued a decree allowing her to adopt her husband's princely title as customary, providing that it be preceded by the title she held as a member of the House of Mecklenburg. The decree became effective upon her marriage, and changed her full title and style to: Her Royal Highness Princess Juliana of the Netherlands, Princess of Orange-Nassau, Duchess of Mecklenburg, Princess of Lippe-Biesterfeld, etc.

After her accession to the throne, Juliana's official title was: "Her Majesty, Juliana, Queen of the Netherlands, Princess of Orange-Nassau, Duchess of Mecklenburg, Princess of Lippe-Biesterfeld, etc, etc, etc". Upon her abdication, she resumed her pre-regnal marital title and style.

=== Arms ===
Coat of arms of Juliana of the Netherlands
Notes As Queen of the Netherlands (1948–1980), Juliana used the Greater Coat of Arms of the Realm, (or "Grote Rijkswapen"). Adopted 23 April 1980 Escutcheon Quarterly, 1 and 3, Azure, billetty Or a lion with a coronet Or armed and langued Gules holding in his dexter paw a sword Argent hilted Or and in the sinister paw seven arrows Argent pointed and bound together Or (royal arms of the Netherlands, i.e. that of her mother, Queen Wilhelmina), 2 and 4, Or, a horn azure, langued gules (arms of the former Principality of Orange), on an inescutcheon argent, a Bull's head sable (for her father's House of Mecklenburg). Banner As Princess, Juliana used a square and swallow tailed flag, with the Royal standard colours and their maternal arms (the horn of Orange) in the upper hoist and their paternal arms (the Bull head of Mecklenburg) in the lower hoist. The arms of the Netherlands (which originates from Nassau) without the insignia of the Order of Willem within an orange circle. Previous versions Juliana as monarch bore the Greater Coat of Arms of the Realm, (or "Grote Rijkswapen"). The components of the coats of arms were regulated by Queen Wilhelmina in a royal decree of 10 July 1907 and were affirmed by Juliana in a royal decree of 23 April 1980: Azure, billetty Or a lion with a coronet Or armed and langued Gules holding in his dexter paw a sword Argent hilted Or and in the sinister paw seven arrows Argent pointed and bound together Or.

== Issue ==
Name	Birth-death	Marriage		
Name	Birth-death	Date	Spouse	Issue
Beatrix of the Netherlands	31 January 1938	10 March 1966 (widowed in 2002)	Jonkheer Claus van Amsberg	Willem-Alexander of the Netherlands; Prince Friso; Prince Constantijn
Princess Irene	5 August 1939	29 April 1964 (divorced in 1981)	Carlos Hugo, Duke of Parma	Carlos, Duke of Parma; Princess Margarita, Countess of Colorno; Prince Jaime, Count of Bardi; Princess Carolina, Marchioness of Sala
Princess Margriet	19 January 1943	10 January 1967	Pieter van Vollenhoven	Prince Maurits; Prince Bernhard; Prince Pieter-Christiaan; Prince Floris
Princess Christina	18 February 1947 – 16 August 2019 (aged 72)	28 June 1975 (divorced in 1996)	Jorge Pérez y Guillermo	Bernardo Guillermo; Nicolás Guillermo; Juliana Guillermo

== Legacy ==
- Shortly after her birth, the inhabitants of a small village near Den Helder asked permission from Queen Wilhelmina to name their village after the young princess. They received permission and they named their village Julianadorp.
- Princess Juliana Park in Ottawa, Ontario, Canada is named after her.
- Princess Juliana International Airport in St. Maarten is named after her.
- Queen Juliana Bridge in Willemstad, Curaçao is named after her.
- She is commemorated in space, in the name of the asteroid 816 Juliana.

Juliana of the Netherlands House of Orange-Nassau Born: 30 April 1909 Died: 20 March 2004
Regnal titles
Preceded by Wilhelmina	Queen of the Netherlands; 4 September 1948 – 30 April 1980	Succeeded by Beatrix
