= 1975 Dutch train hijacking =

Dutch train hostage crisis

1975 Dutch train hostage crisis
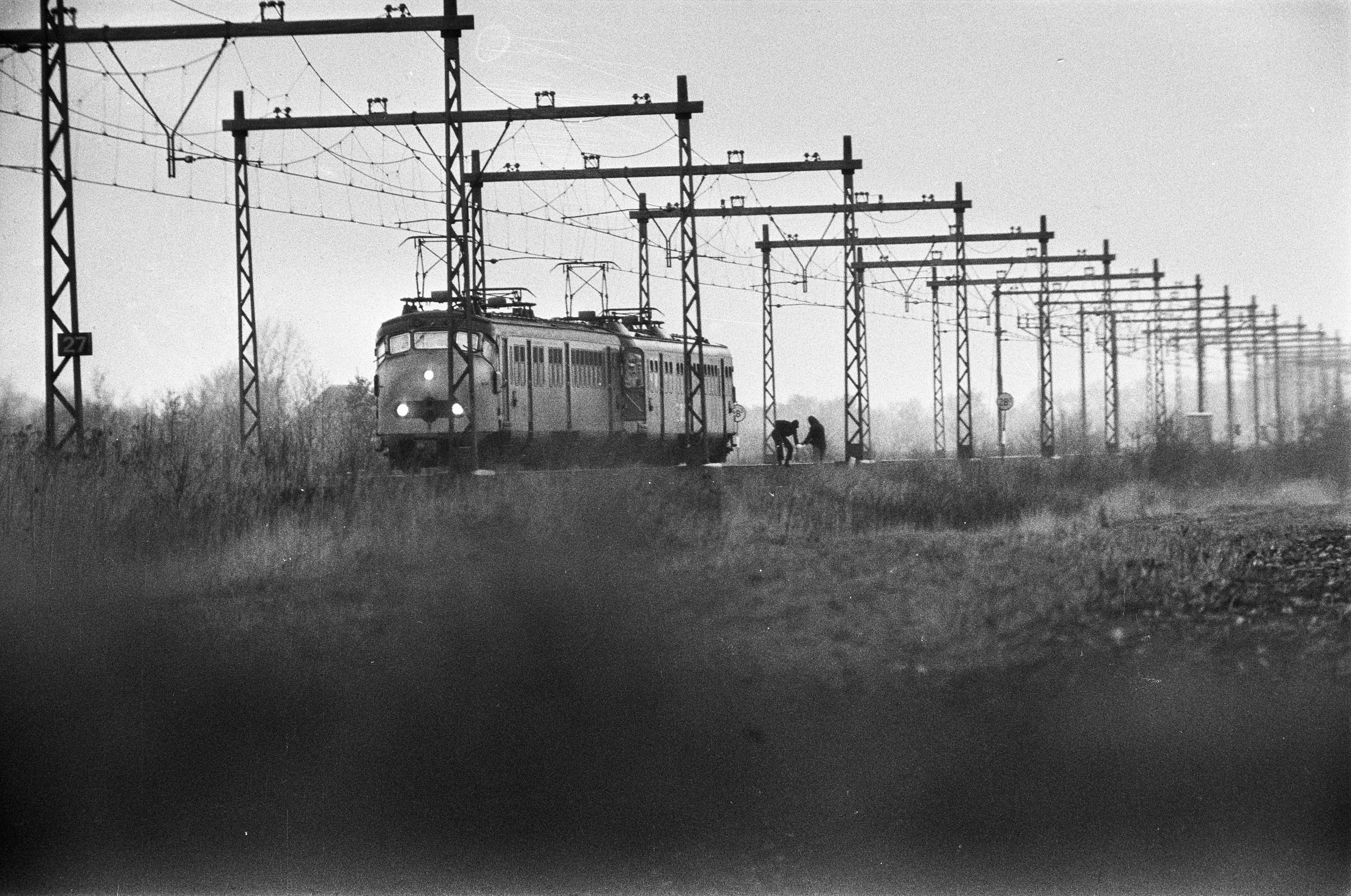
- Location: 52°49′N 6°31′E; Wijster, Netherlands
- Date: 2–14 December 1975
- Target: Train
- Attack type: Murder, hostage-taking
- Weapon: Guns / handguns
- Deaths: 3
- Injuries: unknown
- Perpetrator: Moluccan youth
- Motive: A free South Moluccan Republic (Republik Maluku Selatan)

On 2 December 1975, seven South Moluccans seized a train with about 50 passengers on board in open countryside near the village of Wijster, halfway between Hoogeveen and Beilen in the northern part of the Netherlands. The hijacking lasted for 12 days and three hostages were killed.

At the same time, seven other South-Moluccans took hostages in the Indonesian Consulate in Amsterdam.

The attackers came from Bovensmilde, a village where a few years later another group of South Moluccans seized a primary school. The attackers hid their weapons disguised as presents for the Sinterklaas holiday on 5 December.

== Context ==
The South-Moluccans came to the Netherlands for a temporary stay, promised by the Dutch government that they would get their own independent state, Republik Maluku Selatan (RMS). For about 25 years they lived in temporary camps, often in poor conditions. After these years the younger generation felt betrayed by the Dutch government for not giving them their independent state and they started radical actions to draw attention to their case.

== Developments ==
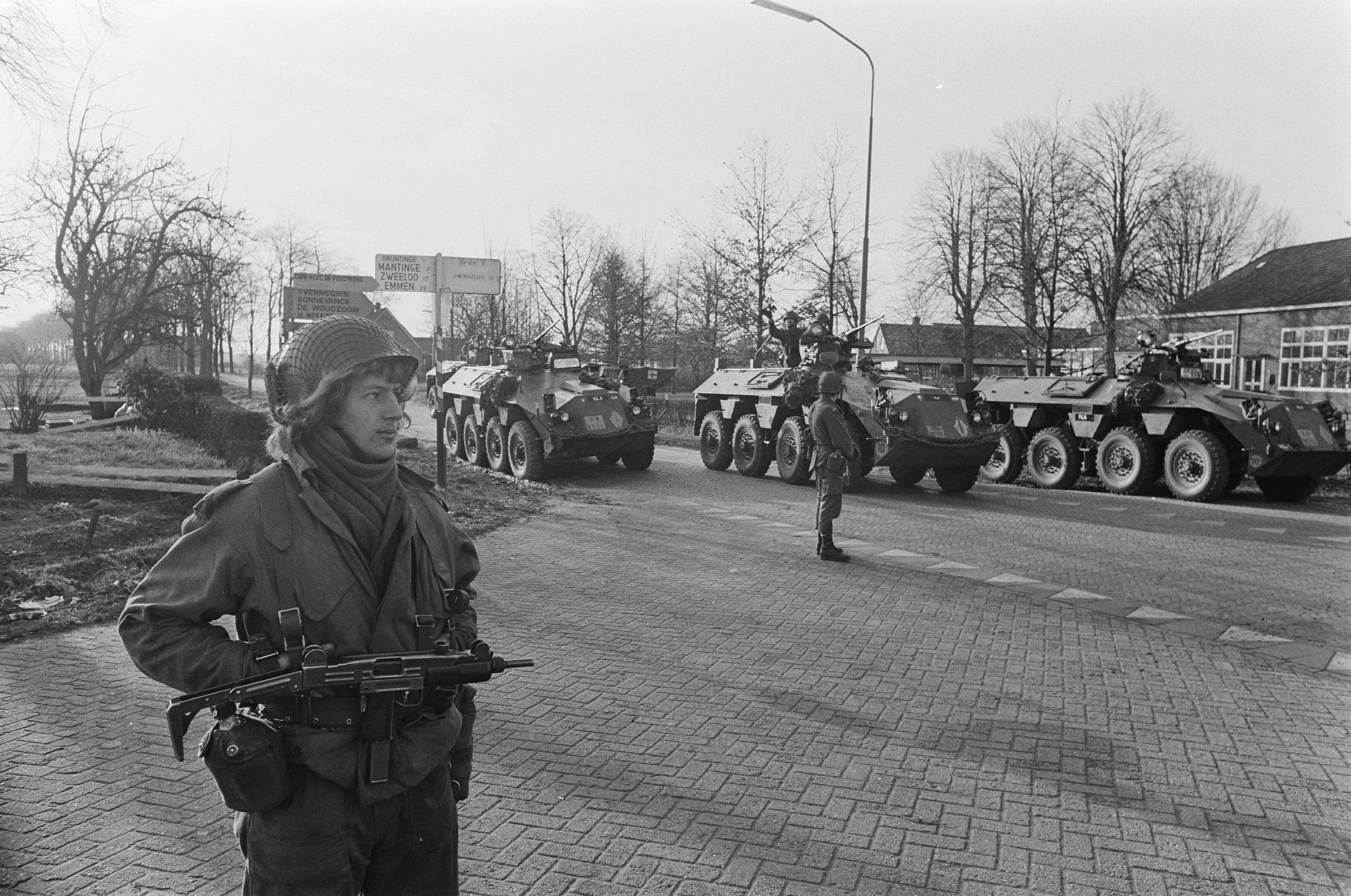
Military roadblock at Wijster

Around 07:10, the emergency cord was pulled on a Nederlandse Spoorwegen regional train travelling from Groningen to Zwolle. The train driver, Hans Braam, was immediately murdered. When, on the third day, the Dutch government had not given the hijackers what they wanted, 22-year-old national serviceman Leo Bulter was murdered and both bodies were thrown out of the train on the rails. That night, 14 hostages managed to escape from the train.

The next day, young economist Bert Bierling was brought to the doors and shot dead in full view of the police and the military as well as the press. The dead bodies thrown from the train were only allowed to be taken away a couple of days later.

On 14 December, the hijackers surrendered. Among reasons for surrender were reports about retaliation on the Moluccan Islands and the sub-zero temperatures in and around the train.

== Aftermath ==
The hijackers were convicted to sentences of 14 years. One member of the hijackers committed suicide in prison in 1978.

=== Costs ===
The hijacking had cost the Nederlandse Spoorwegen 1,850,000 Dutch guilders. Meanwhile, the cost of the phone calls that were made during the hijacking were estimated at ƒ43,500.

== In popular culture ==
In 2008, Wijster, a Dutch-language television film was made about this hostage crisis, directed by Paula van der Oest.

== See also ==
- Attempt at kidnapping Juliana of the Netherlands
- 1977 Dutch train hijacking
- 1978 Dutch province hall hostage crisis
