= 1977 Dutch train hijacking =

Dutch train hijacking by 9 Moluccans

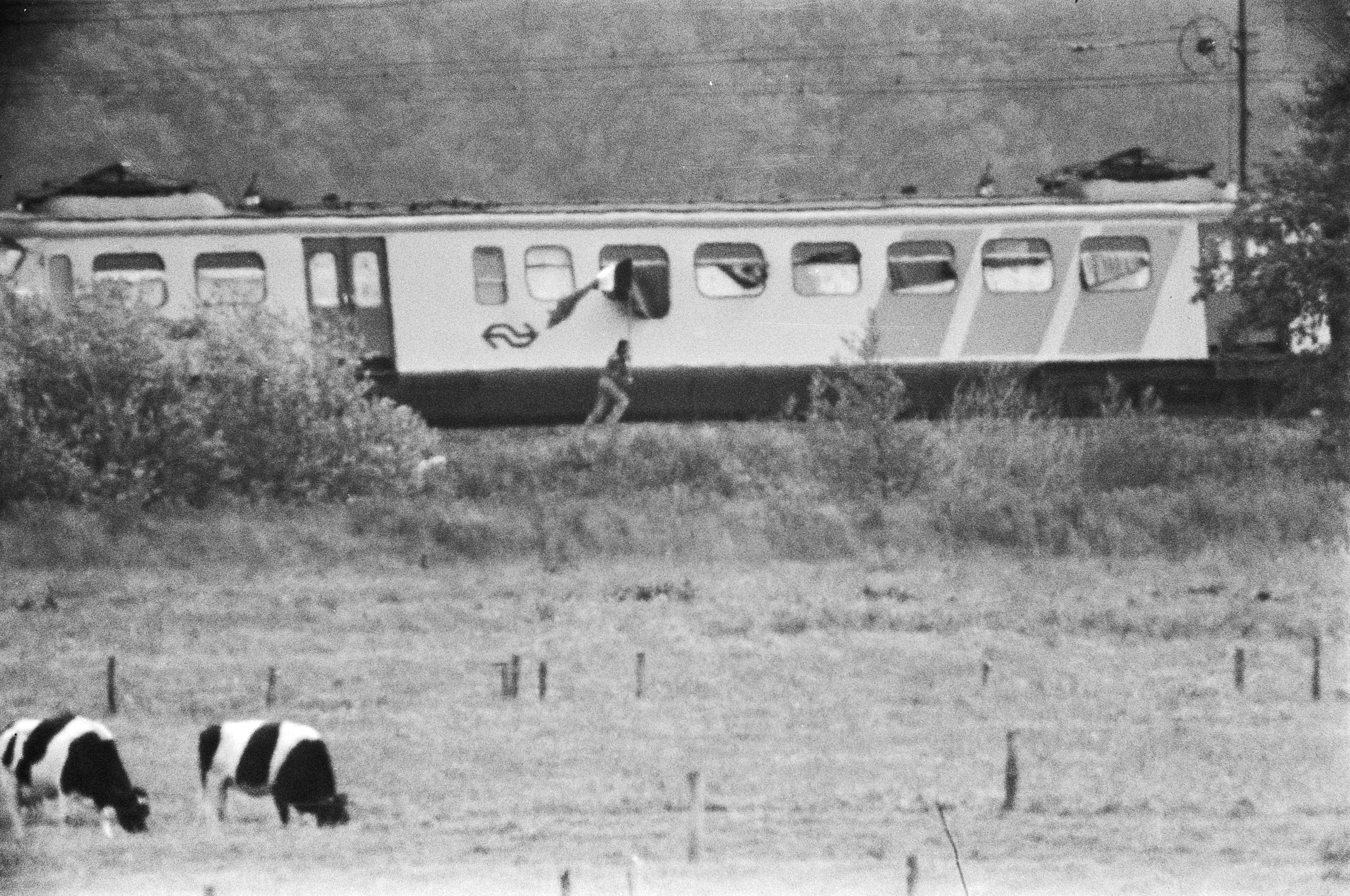
- Hijacker running past the hijacked train with a South Moluccan flag
- Location: 53°7′N 6°36′E; De Punt, Netherlands
- Date: 23 May – 11 June 1977 (20 days)
- Target: Passengers on NS Mat '64
- Attack type: Hostage-taking
- Weapons: Guns, handguns
- Deaths: 8 (including 6 perpetrators)
- Injuries: 6
- Perpetrator: Moluccan nationalists (9 perpetrators)
- Motive: Establishment of the Republic of South Maluku

On 23 May 1977, a Nederlandse Spoorwegen passenger train was hijacked near the village of De Punt, Netherlands. At around 9 am, nine armed Moluccan nationalists pulled the emergency brake and took over fifty people hostage. The hijacking lasted twenty days and ended with a raid by Dutch counter-terrorist special forces, during which two hostages and six hijackers were killed.

The same day as the train hijacking, four other Moluccans took over 100 hostages at a primary school in Bovensmilde, around 20 km (12 mi) away.

== Background ==
The Royal Netherlands East Indies Army was officially disbanded on 26 July 1950, seven months after Indonesia's independence from the Netherlands. However, the Indonesian government forbade Moluccan members stationed in Java from returning to their home islands, fearing that they would join the secessionist Republic of South Maluku. They and their families were then evacuated in the Netherlands in what was initially meant to be a temporary measure; negotiations soon froze. By the 1960s, official Dutch policy had shifted toward permanent resettlement.

Many second-generation Dutch Moluccans grew resentful of the Dutch government, as they felt like it had all but ignored the Moluccan diaspora and their political aspirations. In 1975, ten Moluccans were arrested for conspiring to break into Soestdijk Palace and kidnap Queen Juliana. Later that year, fourteen Moluccans simultaneously hijacked a train and held 51 people hostage at the Indonesian consulate at Amsterdam, leading to a twelve-day hostage crisis which ended in three deaths.

== Planning ==
According to Willem S., the self-proclaimed leader of the hijacking, "I came up with the idea of taking action at the beginning of January this year... after Wijster and Amsterdam, the whole world had not understood what we South Moluccans want." Initial targets included the town hall of Smilde and the headquarters of Nederlandse Omroep Stichting.

Three hijackers cased the train route from Assen to Groningen and drew sketches of the train cars. According to one of the hijackers, "everything was arranged down to the smallest detail, including lists of items to take with you." They met up with the group responsible for the concurrent 1977 Dutch school hostage crisis on 21 May.

== Hijacking ==
At around 9 am on 23 May, one of the hijackers (later identified as Matheus T.) pulled the emergency brake, bringing the train to a stop near De Punt and allowing the others to board. Around 40 people, including the crew, were allowed to leave. The 54 passengers remaining on the train were forced to help cover all the windows with newspapers. Warning shots were fired in order to frighten them into compliance. At the same time, four Moluccans took six teachers and 105 students hostage at a nearby primary school.

Members of the Bijzondere Bijstands Eenheid, Netherlands' special forces unit, quickly surrounded the train while a crisis team was set up in the Ministry of Justice headquarters. In the initial confusion, Indonesian sailors waiting at Vlaardingen Oost metro station were mistakenly assumed to be part of the plot and detained. Election campaigns for the soon-to-come 1977 Dutch general election were canceled by all major parties, so the Den Uyl cabinet could focus its attention on the incident.

Contact between law enforcement and the hijackers was established on 24 May. Among their demands was Dutch assistance in achieving Moluccan independence, the release of 21 prisoners involved in previous attacks, and a way to communicate with those at the school. A deadline was set for 25 May at 2 pm, after which both groups threatened to set off explosives and kill all their hostages. The Dutch government only fulfilled the third demand, providing them with a bugged phone line.

The hijackers failed to carry out their threats once the deadline had passed, instead announcing another demand: fueled aircraft at Amsterdam Schiphol Airport, with which they could fly to a country of their choice. The next day, three blindfolded passengers were briefly brought out with nooses around their necks in what a spokesman described as "perhaps a demonstration of power". Authorities, however, stood firm and decided to cut the line between the train and the school.

=== Negotiations ===
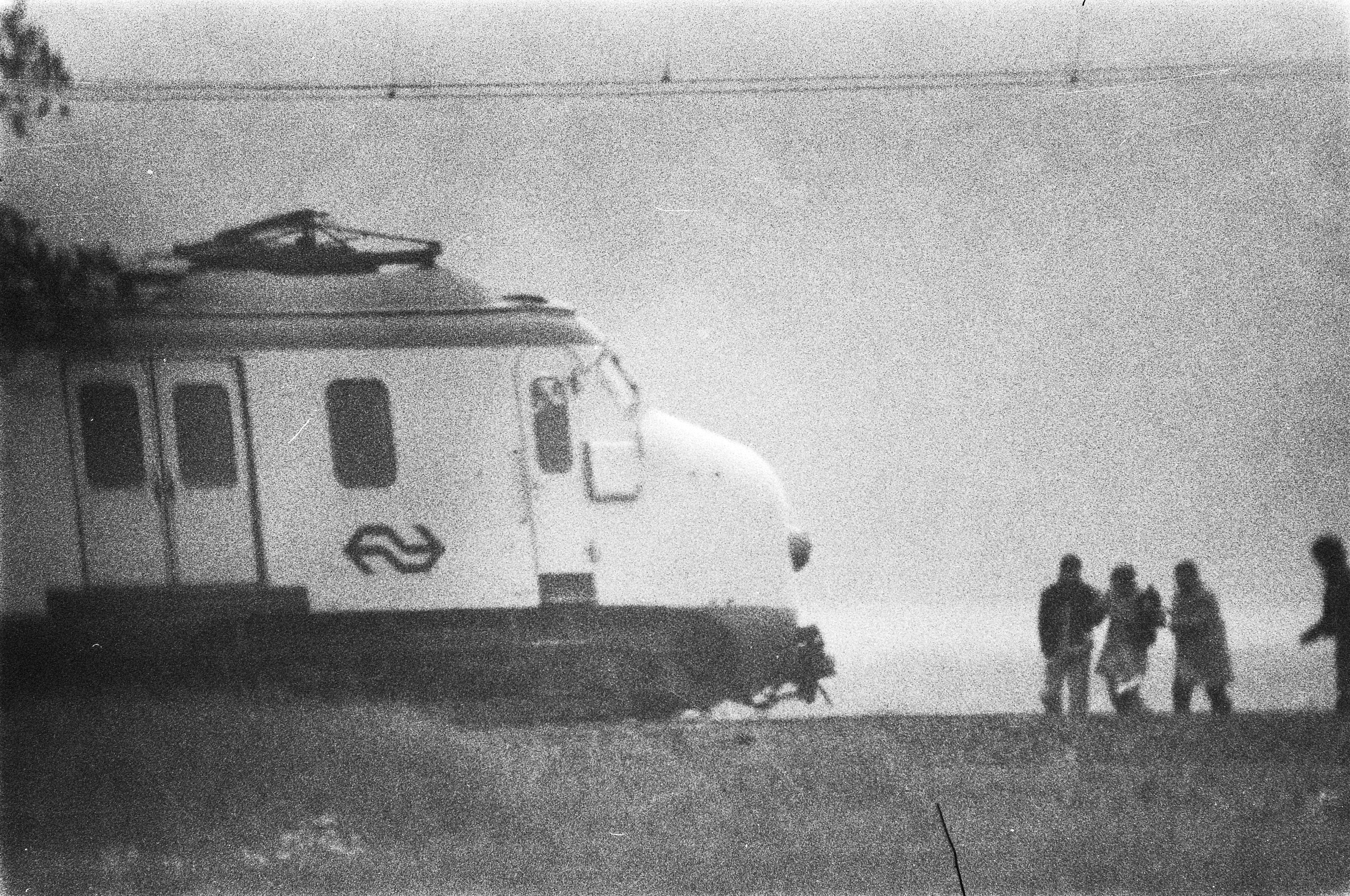
Tan and Soumokil arriving at the train on 9 June

On 31 May, the hijackers requested that negotiators with whom they could talk to face-to-face be sent to the train. After much deliberation, the crisis team selected Hassan Tan and Josina Soumokil (widow of Moluccan guerrilla Chris Soumokil), both well-respected members of the Dutch Moluccan community, to meet them. The following day, as a sign of good faith, two pregnant women were let go on 5 June, including Annie Brouwer-Korf, the future mayor of Utrecht. Another person was let go due to heart problems on 8 June.

On 9 June, during a second meeting with the hijackers, Soumokil is suspected to have, without the knowledge or permission of the authorities, notified them that the People's Republic of Benin was willing to receive them. By 10 June, they had become stubborn, again threatening to kill all the hostages if their demands weren't met.

== Rescue ==
Animated reconstruction of the attack, commissioned by the Dutch government

On 11 June 1977 at 4:54 am, special forces started firing upon the train, shooting approximately 15,000 bullets in all. In order to confuse the hijackers and divert their attention, six Lockheed F-104G Starfighter jet fighter aircraft flew over the area at low altitude, while a team of demolition experts set off explosives. The train was then stormed, and most hostages freed. Six of the nine train hijackers, as well as two hostages, were killed in the assault.

== Aftermath ==
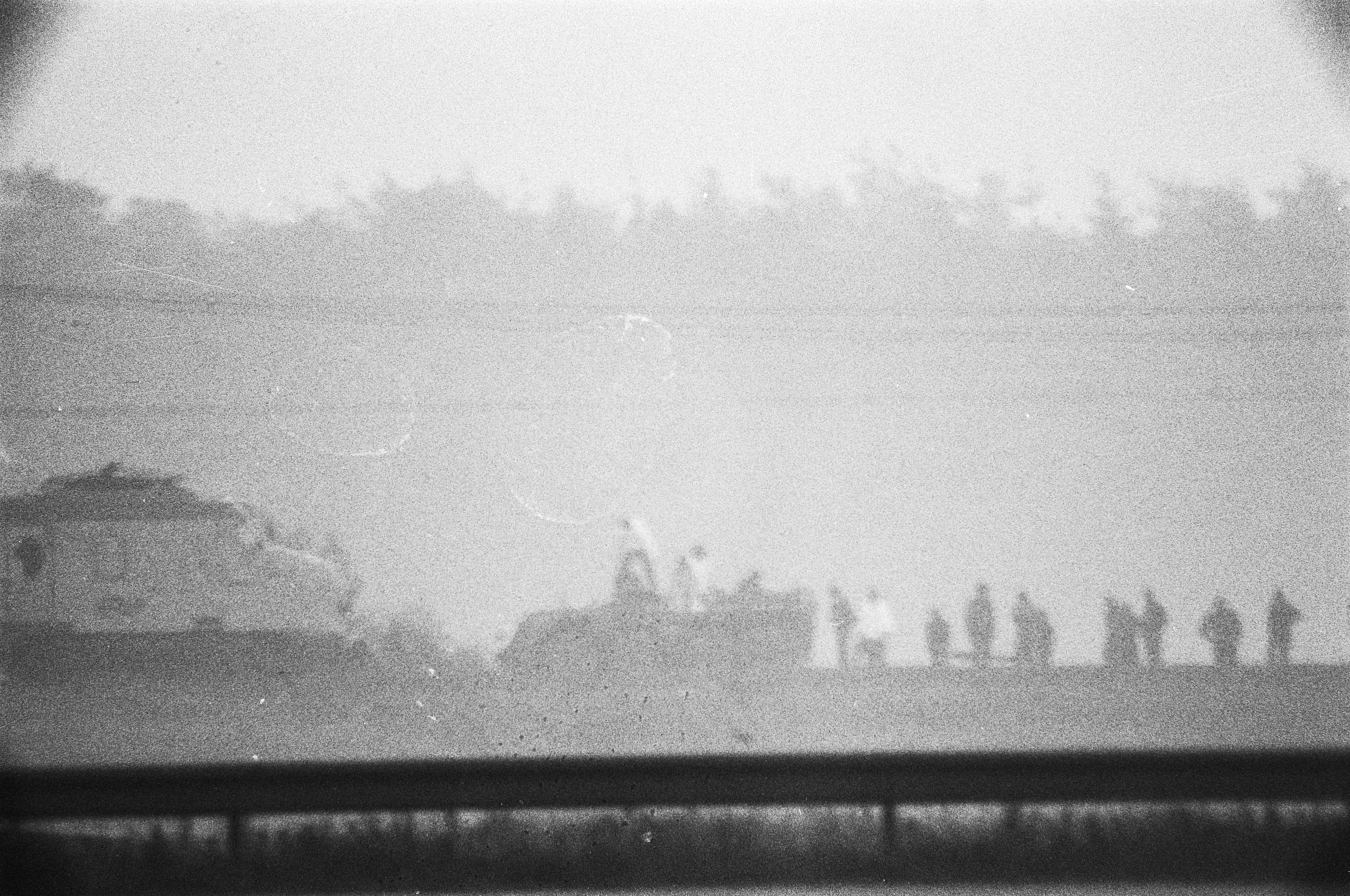
Freed hostages leave the train

Three hijackers survived and, alongside their collaborators at the school, were given six- to nine-year prison sentences. An accomplice was given a one-year sentence. Riots occurred two weeks before the announcement of the verdict, resulting in two schools and a Red Cross centre being set on fire. In 2007, a memorial service was held for the killed hijackers, which around 600 people attended.

According to official sources, six of the hijackers were killed by bullets shot at the train from a distance. On 1 June 2013, reports emerged that an investigation by journalist Jan Beckers and one of the former hijackers, Junus Ririmasse, had concluded that three, and possibly four, of the hijackers had still been alive when the train was stormed, and had been summarily executed by Dutch marines. In November 2014, media reported that Justice Minister van Agt allegedly ordered Dutch military commanders to leave no hijackers alive. An in-depth investigation, published the same month, concluded that no summary executions had taken place, but that unarmed hijackers had been killed by the marines. In 2018, a Dutch court ruled that the Dutch government did not have to pay compensation to relatives of two of the hijackers killed by Marines. The ruling was upheld on appeal on 1 June 2021.

== See also ==
- 1975 Indonesian consulate hostage crisis
- 1978 Dutch province hall hostage crisis
- Attempt at kidnapping Juliana of the Netherlands
- List of hostage crises
- Terrorism in the European Union
