= Bovensmilde =

- Village
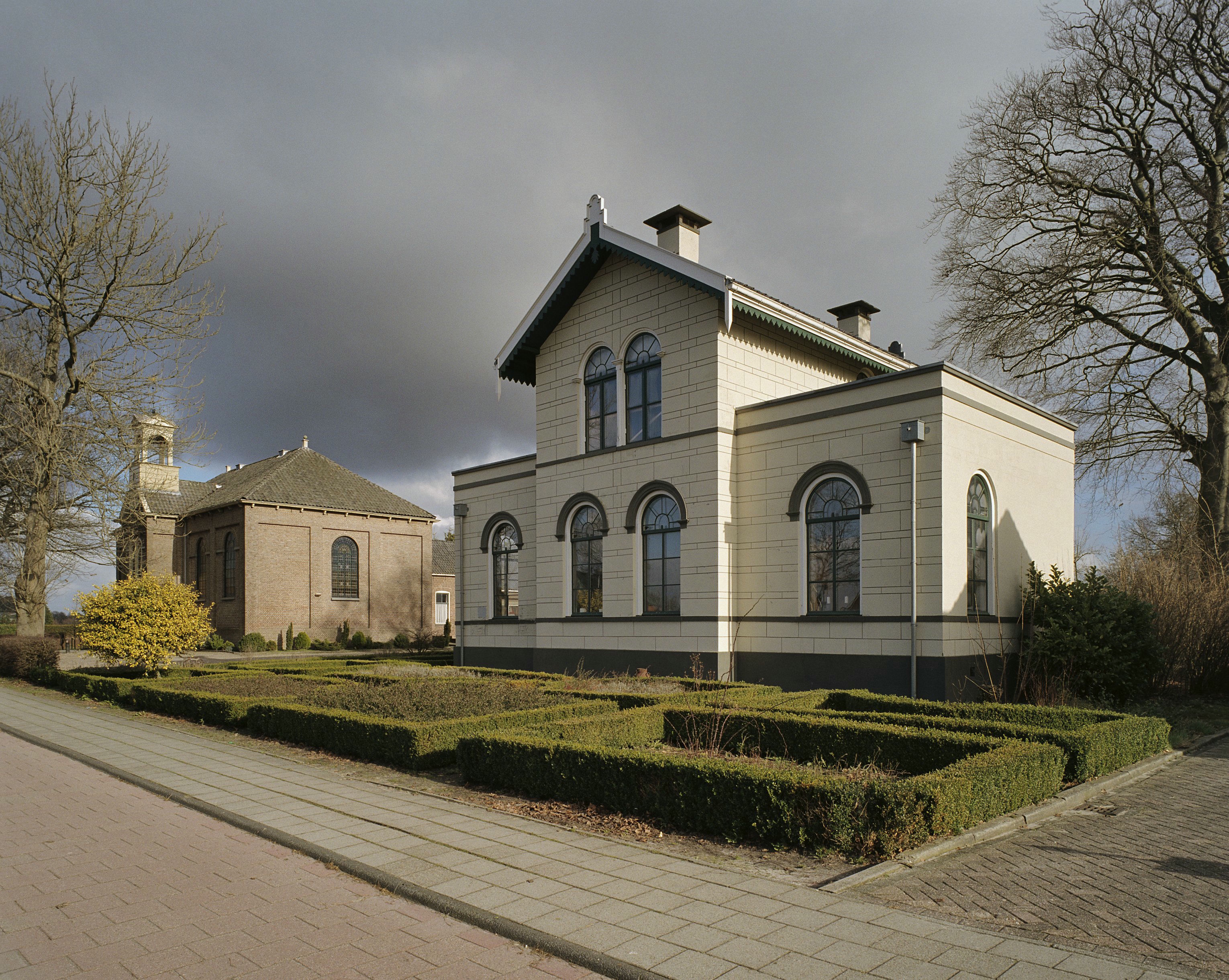
- Clergy house and church in Bovensmilde

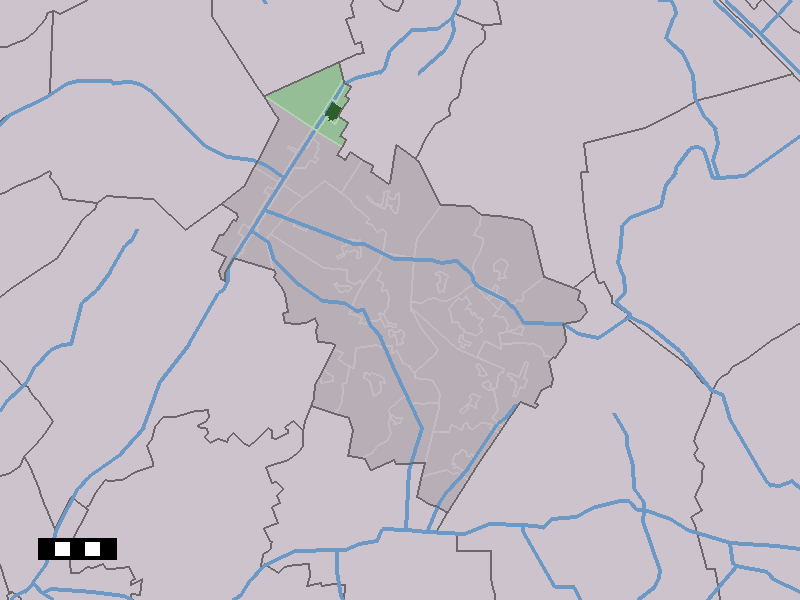
- The town centre (dark green) and the statistical district (light green) of Bovensmilde in the municipality of Midden-Drenthe.

- Location in the Netherlands Bovensmilde (Netherlands)
- Coordinates: 52°58′33″N 6°28′52″E
- Country: Netherlands
- Province: Drenthe
- Municipality: Midden-Drenthe

Area
  - Total: 15.49 km^{2} (5.98 sq mi)
- Elevation: 13 m (43 ft)

Population (2021)
  - Total: 3,350
  - Density: 216/km^{2} (560/sq mi)
- Time zone: UTC+1 (CET)
  - Summer (DST): UTC+2 (CEST)
- Postal code: 9421
- Dialing code: 0592

Bovensmilde is a village in the Netherlands' province of Drenthe. It is a part of the municipality of Midden-Drenthe, and lies about six kilometers (3.7 mi) southwest of Assen.

== History ==
The village was first mentioned in 1847 as Boven-Smilde (literally: Upper-Smilde), and refers to north-eastern part of the peat excavation of Smilde. Bovensmilde is a linear settlement which started as a peat excavation village along the Drentsche Hoofdvaart. It was sometimes referred to as Nieuw-Smilde (New Smilde).

Bovensmilde was home to 896 people in 1840. The Dutch Reformed church is an aisleless church built between 1868 and 1869 in neoclassic style. It has a wooden tower.

== School hostage crisis ==
In 1949, Indonesia became independent, and the Royal Netherlands East Indies Army was disbanded. The islands of Ambon, Buru, and Seram had fought on side of the Netherlands. They were opposed to a Java-dominated Indonesia, and proclaimed the Republic of South Maluku which resulted in an attack by Indonesia. In 1951, 12,000 refugees from South Maluku were temporarily resettled in the Netherlands. They started to feel betrayed, because it developed into permanent exile.

On 23 May 1977, four armed Moluccans occupied an elementary school in Bovensmilde and took 105 children and five teachers as hostages. After five days the children were released. On 11 June, the five remaining teachers were freed when the school was stormed by a Dutch army tank, and the hostage takers were apprehended.

== Education ==
There are two primary schools, De Meenthe and De Wingerd.
