= 1975 Indonesian consulate hostage crisis =

Hostage crisis in Amstedam

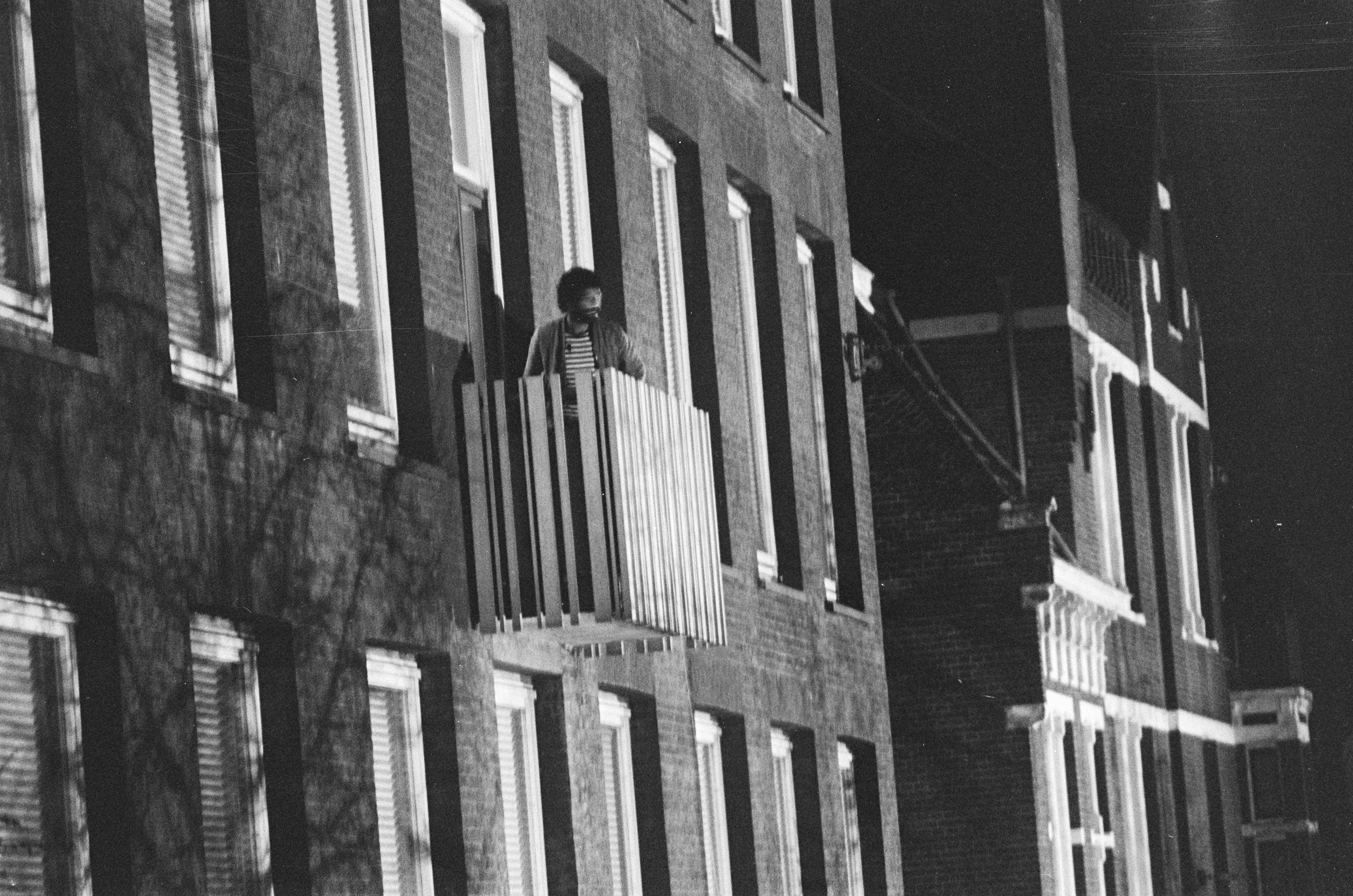
Hostage taker on balcony of consulate

On 4 December 1975, seven armed Moluccans raided the Indonesian consulate in Amsterdam in support of a train hijacking near the village of Wijster which had started two days before. After taking 41 hostages, including 16 children, the terrorists moved into the Indonesian consulate in Amsterdam, towards the top floor. Several consulate employees climbed out of the consulate via a rope. One attempted to jump to the ground, but fell 30 feet (9.1 m) and died five days later from his injuries in a hospital.

By this point, around 60 people were being held hostage inside the consulate. The gunmen made their demands to a group of police and special forces; they asked for the release of several South Moluccan political prisoners, and for talks to begin between the Moluccan leader and the Indonesian president Suharto. The Dutch negotiators refused all of the demands, even after twelve of the children were released, insisting that they would not negotiate until all of the children were released. The rebels gathered the children on a third-floor balcony, threatening to push them off the edge if their demands were not met. They chose not to push any children over the edge, however.

The crisis ended on 19 December when the hostage-takers surrendered after being given vague promises of meetings with Dutch and Indonesian authorities to talk about their case. The hostage-takers were later convicted and given seven-year sentences.

== See also ==
- 1975 Attempted kidnapping of Juliana of the Netherlands
- 1975 Dutch train hostage crisis
- 1977 Dutch train hostage crisis
- 1977 Dutch school hostage crisis
- 1978 Dutch province hall hostage crisis
