= 1977 Dutch school hostage crisis =

South Moluccan independence attack

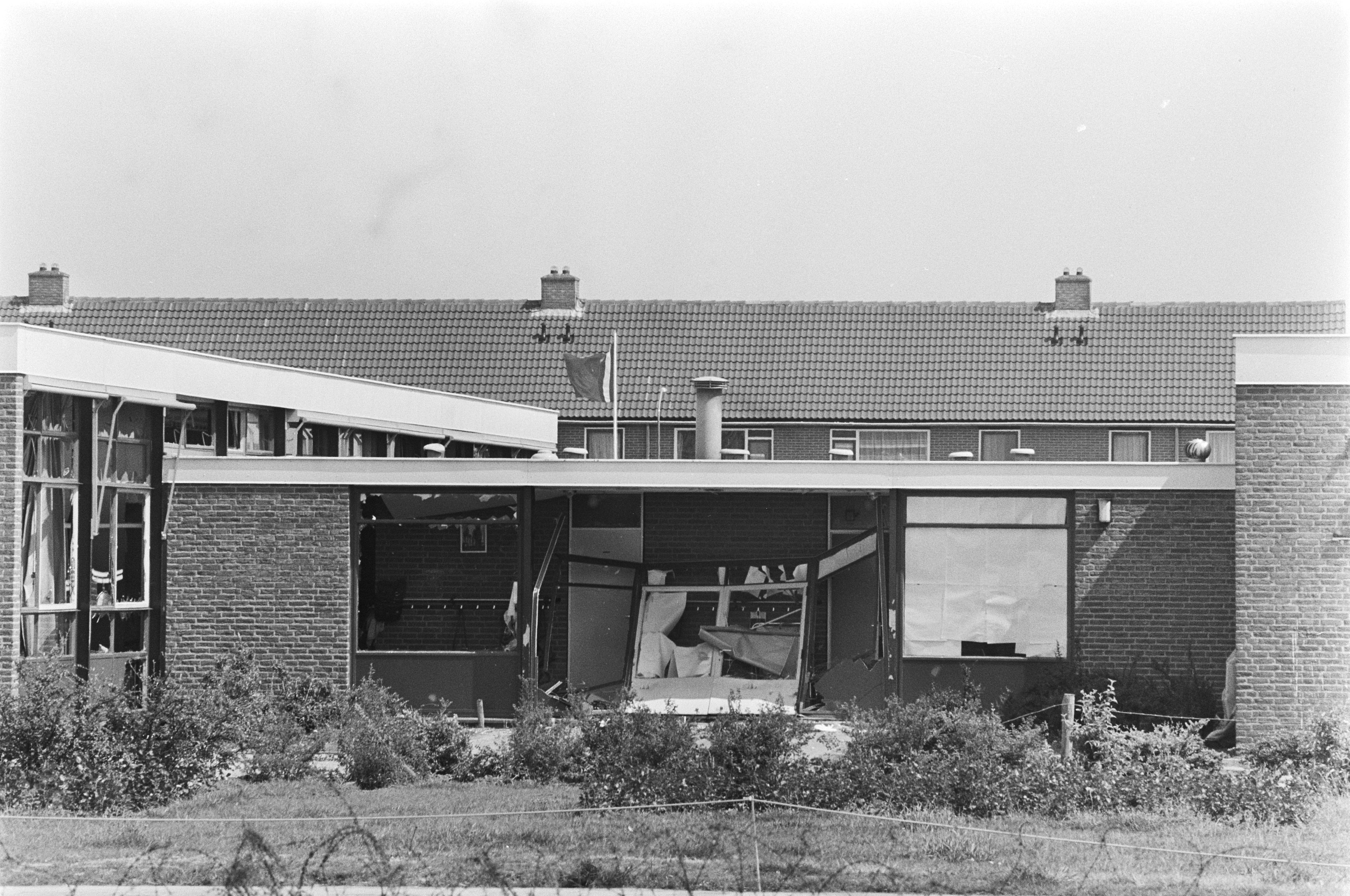
- The school after the military intervention
- Location: 52.9751°N 6.4794°E; Bovensmilde, Netherlands
- Date: 23 May – 11 June 1977
- Target: Primary school
- Attack type: Hostage-taking
- Weapon: Guns / handguns
- Deaths: 0
- Perpetrator: Moluccan youth (4 perpetrators)
- Motive: A free South Moluccan Republic (Republik Maluku Selatan)

On the morning of Monday 23 May 1977, four armed South-Moluccans took 105 children and their five teachers hostage at a primary school in Bovensmilde, Netherlands. At the same time nine others hijacked a train in the nearby De Punt. Both hostage crises lasted for twenty days before they were neutralized by military interventions.

== Context ==
The South Moluccans had arrived in the Netherlands for a temporary stay, promised by the Dutch government that they would get their own independent state, Republik Maluku Selatan (RMS). For about 25 years they lived in temporary camps, often in poor conditions. After these years the younger generation felt betrayed by the Dutch government for not giving them their independent state and they began radical actions to gain attention for their cause.

== Developments ==
23 May
On 09:00, when the hostage crises began, the children were forced to cover the windows with newspapers, preventing the outside world from knowing what was happening inside.
25 May
The day of the elections for the national parliament. To increase pressure on the government, the children were forced to shout out of the windows: "van Agt, we want to live". The first ultimatum expired at 14:00 without any problems. Later that day, additional demands were expressed.
27 May
All the children were released because many children had become ill from some unknown disease. The cause and nature of these disease is still unknown, but it was often speculated that the provided food might have been deliberately poisoned with laxatives by authorities to force a break-through. This was substantiated by a statement from Dutch Prime Minister Dries van Agt in a Dutch documentary, where he said: "Ik vind het een uitstekend idee (...) een laxeermiddel hebben we allemaal wel eens nodig." [I think it's a great idea (...) everybody needs a laxative now and then.] Four teachers were retained as hostages.
11 June
Marines attacked the school at 05:00 in the morning. An armoured car and explosives punched a hole in the wall, and marines entered the building. The Moluccans surrendered without a fight after hearing about the subsequent military attack on the train at De Punt.

== Aftermath ==
The four attackers were convicted with sentences varying from six to nine years.

The Moluccan community has never made any apologies, but two of the hostage takers, motivated by born-again Christianity, have had a meeting with former victims in 2007.

Thirty years after the events, on 23 May 2007, a monument was erected, and the first memorial ceremony was held, where symbolic white balloons were released.

== See also ==
- Attempt at kidnapping Juliana of the Netherlands
- 1975 Dutch train hostage crisis
- 1975 Indonesian consulate hostage crisis
- 1977 Dutch train hostage crisis
- 1978 Dutch province hall hostage crisis
