= List of hostage crises =

This is a list of notable hostage crises by date.

Incident	Location(s)	Start	Duration	Number of hostages
Gaza war hostage crisis	Gaza envelope, Israel	7 October 2023	843 days	250+
Nduga hostage crisis	Nduga Regency, Highland Papua, Indonesia	7 February 2023	592 days	9+
Leidseplein hostage crisis	Leidseplein, Amsterdam, Netherlands	22 February 2022	5 hours	1
Colleyville synagogue hostage crisis	Colleyville, Texas, United States	15 January 2022	10 hours, 41 minutes	4
2020 Lutsk hostage crisis	Lutsk, Volyn Oblast, Ukraine	21 July 2020	12 hours, 21 minutes	13
2020 Greenhills hostage crisis	San Juan, Metro Manila, Philippines	2 March 2020	9 hours	55
Carcassonne and Trèbes attack	Trèbes, Aude, France	23 March 2018	3 hours, 40 minutes	2
Siege of Marawi	Marawi, Lanao del Sur, Philippines	23 May 2017	5 months	1,770+
2017 Hanoi hostage crisis	Hanoi, Vietnam	15 April 2017	10 days	38
2016 Yerevan hostage crisis	Yerevan, Armenia	17 July 2016	15 days	9
July 2016 Dhaka attack	Gulshan, Dhaka, Bangladesh	1 July 2016	11 hours, 10 minutes	35+
Orlando nightclub shooting	Orlando, Florida, United States	12 June 2016	3 hours, 12 minutes	320
Kunduz-Takhar highway hostage crisis	(Islamic Republic of Afghanistan) Kunduz Province, Afghanistan	31 May 2016	Unclear end date	220+
2015 Bamako hotel attack	Bamako, Mali	20 November 2015	9 hours	170
November 2015 Paris attacks	Paris, France	13 November 2015	2 hours, 20 minutes	20
Samal Island hostage crisis	Samal, Davao del Norte, Philippines	22 September 2015	13 months	4
Hypercacher kosher supermarket siege	Porte de Vincennes, Paris, France	9 January 2015	4 hours 30 minutes	19
2014 Peshawar school massacre	Army Public School Peshawar, Peshawar, Pakistan	15 December 2014	7 hours	1,099
Lindt Cafe siege	Martin Place, Sydney, Australia	15 December 2014	Approximately 17 hours	18
2014 Stockton bank robbery	Stockton, California and Lodi, California, United States	16 July 2014	Approximately 1 hour	3
2014 Moscow school shooting	Moscow, Russia	3 February 2014	Approximately 2 hours	29
Westgate shopping mall attack	Nairobi, Kenya	21 September 2013	3 days	
Zamboanga City crisis	Zamboanga City, Philippines	9 September 2013	19 days	
2013 Islamabad hostage crisis	Islamabad, Pakistan	15 August 2013	6 hours	
2013 Hialeah shooting	(United States) Hialeah, Florida	26 July 2013	Approximately 3 hours	
2013 Alabama bunker hostage crisis	(United States) Midland City, Alabama	29 January 2013	6 days	
In Amenas hostage crisis	In Amenas, Algeria	16 January 2013	3 days	
2012 Bain murder-kidnappings	Whiteville, Tennessee and Alpine, Mississippi, United States	27 April 2012	13 days	
2011 Muar kindergarten hostage crisis	Muar, Johor, Malaysia	7 July 2011	6 hours	30
2011 Hectorville siege	Hectorville, South Australia, Australia	29 April 2011	8 hours	
Panama City school board shootings	Panama City, Florida, United States	14 December 2010	Unknown	
2010 Baghdad church massacre	Baghdad, Iraq	31 October 2010	About 4 hours	
2010 Discovery headquarters hostage crisis	Silver Spring, Maryland, United States	1 September 2010	About 5 hours	
Manila hostage crisis	Manila, Philippines	23 August 2010	10 hours 30 mins	
2010 Ahmadiyya mosques massacre	Lahore, Pakistan	28 May 2010	Some hours	
October 2009 Lahore attacks	Lahore, Pakistan	15 October 2009	1 hour 30 mins	
2009 Pakistan Army General Headquarters attack	Rawalpindi, Pakistan	10 October 2009	1 day	
2009 Yemen hostage crisis	Saada Governorate, Yemen	12 June 2009	11 months	9
Binghamton shooting	Binghamton, New York, United States	3 April 2009	1 day	
2009 Lahore police academy attack	Lahore, Pakistan	30 March 2009	Some hours	
Bangladesh Rifles revolt	Pilkhana, Dhaka, Bangladesh	25 February 2009	2 days	
2008 Mumbai attacks	Mumbai, Maharashtra, India	26 November 2008	3 days	
Eloá Pimentel hostage crisis	Santo André, São Paulo, Brazil	13 October 2008	4 days	
Espírito Santo Bank of Campolide robbery	Lisbon, Portugal	7 August 2008	8 hours	
South Korean hostage crisis in Afghanistan	(Islamic Republic of Afghanistan) Ghazni Province, Afghanistan	19 July 2007	42 days	
Siege of Lal Masjid	Islamabad, Pakistan	3 July 2007	9 days	
Johnson Space Center shooting	Houston, Texas, United States	20 April 2007	About 3 hours	
West Nickel Mines School shooting	Lancaster County, Pennsylvania, United States	2 October 2006	Some hours	
Platte Canyon High School hostage crisis	Bailey, Colorado, United States	27 September 2006	About 4 hours	
Seattle Jewish Federation shooting	Seattle, Washington, United States	28 July 2006	Approximately 15 minutes	
Chrobog family kidnapping	Yemen	28 December 2005	3 days	
2005 raid on Nalchik	Nalchik, Russia	13 October 2005	Some hours	
Ennepetal hostage taking	Ennepetal, Germany	12 April 2005	About 6 hours	
Beslan school siege	Beslan, Russia	1 September 2004	3 days	
2004 Khobar massacre	Khobar, Saudi Arabia	29 May 2004	25 hours	
2003 Sahara hostage crisis	Algeria	22 January 2003	208 days	
Moscow theater hostage crisis	Moscow, Russia	23 October 2002	2½ days	
Akshardham Temple attack	Gandhinagar, India	24 September 2002	2 days	
Dos Palmas kidnappings	Palawan, Philippines	27 May 2001	Varied periods	
Operation Barras	Sierra Leone	10 October 2000	17 days	
Bus 174 hostage crisis	Rio de Janeiro, Brazil	12 June 2000	Some hours	
Sauk Siege	Kuala Kangsar, Perak, Malaysia	5 June 2000	3 days	
Wasserbillig crèche hostage crisis	Wasserbillig, Luxembourg	31 May 2000	28 hours	52
2000 Fijian coup d'état	Suva, Fiji	19 May 2000	56 days	
Nishi-Tetsu bus hijacking	Fukuoka, Yamaguchi, and Hiroshima Prefectures, Japan	3–4 May 2000	15 hours	21
2000 Sipadan kidnappings	Sipadan, Malaysia, Jolo, Philippines	23 April 2000	Varied periods	
Joseph Palczynski standoff	Dundalk, Maryland, United States	17 March 2000	4 days	
Indian Airlines Flight 814	Amritsar, India, (United Arab Emirates) Dubai, UAE, Lahore, Pakistan, Kandahar, Afghanistan	24 December 1999	8 days	190
1998 Cúa hostage crisis	Cúa, Venezuela	5 April 1998	7 hours	
Japanese embassy hostage crisis	Lima, Peru	17 December 1996	126 days	
Terrazas del Ávila hostage crisis	Caracas, Venezuela	15 April 1996	20 hours	
1996 Honolulu hostage crisis	Honolulu, Hawaii, United States	6 February 1996	7 hours	
Black Sea hostage crisis	Trabzon, Turkey, Sochi, Russia	16 January 1996	4 days	
Kizlyar–Pervomayskoye hostage crisis	Kizlyar and Pervomayskoye, Russia	9 January 1996	9 days	
Cologne hostage crisis	Cologne, Germany	28 July 1995	7 hours	24
1995 kidnapping of western tourists in Kashmir	Pahalgam, India	4 July 1995	Unknown	
San Román Tragedy	Caracas, Venezuela	23 June 1995	6 hours	
Budyonnovsk hospital hostage crisis	Budyonnovsk, Russia	14 June 1995	5 days	
1995 Salvadoran legislature hostage crisis	San Salvador, El Salvador	24 January 1995	2 days	~2,500
Air France Flight 8969	Algiers, Algeria, Marseille, France	24 December 1994	3 days	232
1994 kidnappings of western tourists in India	New Delhi, India	20 October 1994	12 days	4
1994 Salvadoran legislature hostage crisis	San Salvador, El Salvador	26 September 1994	2 days	~200
Torp hostage crisis	Larvik and Sandefjord, Norway	28 August 1994	2 days	
Gresham cat hostage taking incident	Gresham, Oregon, United States	21 August 1994	Unknown	1 cat
Salt Lake City Public Library hostage incident	Salt Lake City, Utah, United States	7 March 1994	6 hours	
1993 Jolimont Centre siege	Canberra, Australia	29 November 1993	2 hours	
Neuilly kindergarten hostage crisis	Neuilly-sur-Seine, France	13 May 1993	2 days	22
Supreme Court of Justice hostage crisis	San José, Costa Rica	26 April 1993	4 days	
1993 Cangai siege	Cangai, New South Wales, Australia	30 March 1993	26 hours	
East Carter High School shooting	Grayson, Kentucky, United States	18 January 1993	16 minutes	
Lindhurst High School shooting	Olivehurst, California, United States	1 May 1992	8 hours	
Alta View Hospital hostage incident	Sandy, Utah, United States	20 September 1991	18 hours	
1991 Sacramento hostage crisis	Sacramento, California, United States	4 April 1991	About 8 hours	41
Singapore Airlines Flight 117	Singapore	26 March 1991	12 hours	125
Henry's Pub hostage incident	Berkeley, California, United States	28 September 1990	7 hours	33
1990 Hotel Delfino siege	Tuguegarao, Cagayan, Philippines	4 March 1990	Unknown	
1989 Davao hostage crisis	Davao City, Philippines	13 August 1989	3 days	
Camp Cawa-Cawa siege	Zamboanga City, Philippines	5 January 1989	12 hours	
Loveland River House incident	Loveland, Colorado, United States	3 January 1989	2 hours	
Papal visit hostage crisis	Maseru, Lesotho	13 September 1988	1 day	
Gladbeck hostage crisis	Gladbeck, Bremen, Sottrum, and Cologne, West Germany, Oldenzaal, Netherlands	16 August 1988	3 days	29
Ouvéa cave hostage taking	(France) Ouvéa, New Caledonia	22 April 1988	14 days	
Kuwait Airways Flight 422	Mashhad, Iran, Larnaca, Cyprus, Algiers, Algeria	5 April 1988	15 days	110
Pudu prison siege	Kuala Lumpur, Malaysia	17 October 1986	6 days	
Pan Am Flight 73	Karachi, Pakistan	5 September 1986	1 day	379
Mikkeli hostage crisis	Helsinki and Mikkeli, Finland	8 August 1986	14 hours 10 mins	
Oulu plane hijacking 1986	Oulu, Finland	20 May 1986	2 hours 45 mins	
Cokeville Elementary School hostage crisis	Cokeville, Wyoming, United States	16 May 1986	2½ hours	
EgyptAir Flight 648	Luqa, Malta	23 November 1985	2 days	98
Palace of Justice siege	Bogotá, Colombia	6 November 1985	2 days	
Achille Lauro hijacking	Alexandria and Port Said, Egypt	7 October 1985	2 days	97+
Trans World Airlines Flight 847	Beirut, Lebanon, Algiers, Algeria	14 June 1985	16 days	155
Bus 300 affair	Tel Aviv and Ashkelon, Israel	12 April 1984	2 days	
1984 Libyan hostage incident	Tripoli, Libya	17 April 1984	9 months	
1984 Sydney bank robbery	Sydney, Australia	31 January 1984	6 hours	
Abduction of western tourists in Matabeleland	Lupane, Zimbabwe	23 July 1982	Unknown	
Lebanon hostage crisis	Beirut, Lebanon	19 July 1982	Varied periods	
Garuda Indonesian Airways Flight 206	Bangkok, Thailand	28 March 1981	3 days	53
Iranian Embassy siege	London, United Kingdom	30 April 1980	6 days	
Dominican embassy siege	Bogotá, Colombia	27 February 1980	61 days	
Grand Mosque seizure	Mecca, Saudi Arabia	20 November 1979	14 days	50,000+
Iran hostage crisis	Tehran, Iran	4 November 1979	444 days	53
Mitsubishi Bank hostage incident	Osaka, Japan	26 January 1979	2 days	
Finnair Flight 405	Helsinki, Finland	30 September 1978	19 hours	
1978 Assen province hall hostage crisis	Assen, Netherlands	13 March 1978	1 day	71
Cyprus Airways hijacking	Larnaca, Cyprus	19 February 1978	1 day	
Lufthansa Flight 181	Larnaca, Cyprus, (United Arab Emirates) Dubai, UAE, Aden, South Yemen, Mogadishu, Somalia	13 October 1977	5 days	
Japan Air Lines Flight 472	Dhaka, Bangladesh, Kuwait City, Kuwait, Damascus, Syria	28 September 1977	5 days	
1977 De Punt train hijacking	De Punt, Netherlands	23 May 1977	20 days	54
1977 Bovensmilde school hostage crisis	Bovensmilde, Netherlands	23 May 1977	4 days	110
1977 Hanafi siege	Washington, D.C., United States	9 March 1977	39 hours	
TWA Flight 355	Montreal and Gander, Canada, Keflavík, Iceland, Paris, France	10 September 1976	2 days	
Operation Entebbe	Benghazi, Libya, Entebbe, Uganda	27 June 1976	8 days	258
Balcombe Street siege	London, United Kingdom	6 December 1975	5 days	
OPEC siege	Vienna, Austria, Algiers, Algeria, Tripoli, Libya	21 December 1975	3 days	
1975 Indonesian consulate hostage crisis	Amsterdam, Netherlands	4 December 1975	15 days	42
Wijster kidnapping	Wijster, Netherlands	2 December 1975	12 days	75
Philippine Airlines Flight 111	Manila, Philippines	6 October 1975	1 hour	
Spaghetti House siege	London, United Kingdom	28 September 1975	6 days	6
1975 AIA building hostage crisis	Kuala Lumpur, Malaysia	5 August 1975	5 days	
Israeli consulate hostage crisis	Johannesburg, South Africa	29 April 1975	19 hours	
West German Embassy siege in Stockholm	Stockholm, Sweden	24 April 1975	12 hours	
1974 French Embassy attack in The Hague	The Hague, Netherlands	13 September 1974	4 days	11
1974 Huntsville Prison siege	Huntsville, Texas, United States	24 July 1974	11 days	
Ma'alot massacre	Ma'alot, Israel	15 May 1974	2 days	
Claustre Affair	Bardaï, Chad	20 April 1974	1018 days	4
Laju incident	Singapore	31 January 1974	8 days	
Norrmalmstorg robbery	Stockholm, Sweden	23 August 1973	5 days	
Roman Catholic mission hostage crisis	Centenary, Rhodesia	5 July 1973	Unknown	
1973 CIBC bank robbery	Kenora, Ontario, Canada	10 May 1973	Unknown	
Attack on the Saudi Embassy in Khartoum	Khartoum, Sudan	1 March 1973	2½ days	
1973 Brooklyn hostage crisis	New York City, New York, United States	19 January 1973	3 days	
Balassagyarmat hostage crisis	Balassagyarmat, Hungary	7 January 1973	6 days	
Lufthansa Flight 615	(Socialist Federal Republic of Yugoslavia) Zagreb, Yugoslavia	29 October 1972	15 hours	
Munich massacre	Munich, West Germany	5 September 1972	21 hours	
Lod Airport massacre	Lod, Israel	30 May 1972	24 minutes	
Sabena Flight 572	Lod, Israel	8 May 1972	1 day	
Lufthansa Flight 649	Aden, South Yemen	22 February 1972	2 days	
Asama-Sansō incident	Karuizawa, Japan	19 February 1972	9 days	
Northwest Orient Flight 305	Washington and Oregon, United States	24 November 1971	4 hours	
October Crisis	Quebec, Canada	5 October 1970	60 days	
Dawson's Field hijackings	Zarka, Jordan	6 September 1970	8 days	
Marin County Civic Center attacks	San Rafael, California, United States	7 August 1970	2 hours	
Operation Dragon Rouge	(Democratic Republic of the Congo) Stanleyville, Congo-Léopoldville	24 November 1964	20–30 days	
Aerolíneas Argentinas Flight 648 hijacking	Stanley, Falkland Islands	28 September 1966	2 days	
Siege of Sidney Street	(United Kingdom of Great Britain and Ireland) London, United Kingdom	2 January 1911	2 days	
Battle of Ballingarry	(United Kingdom of Great Britain and Ireland) Ballingarry, Ireland, United Kingdom	29 July 1848	1 day	
Froberg mutiny	Fort Ricasoli, Malta	4 April 1807	6 days	

== See also ==
- List of non-international armed conflicts
- List of proxy wars
- List of terrorist incidents
- List of wars: 2003–present
