= Hong Thai Travel Services =

Tourism in Hong Kong

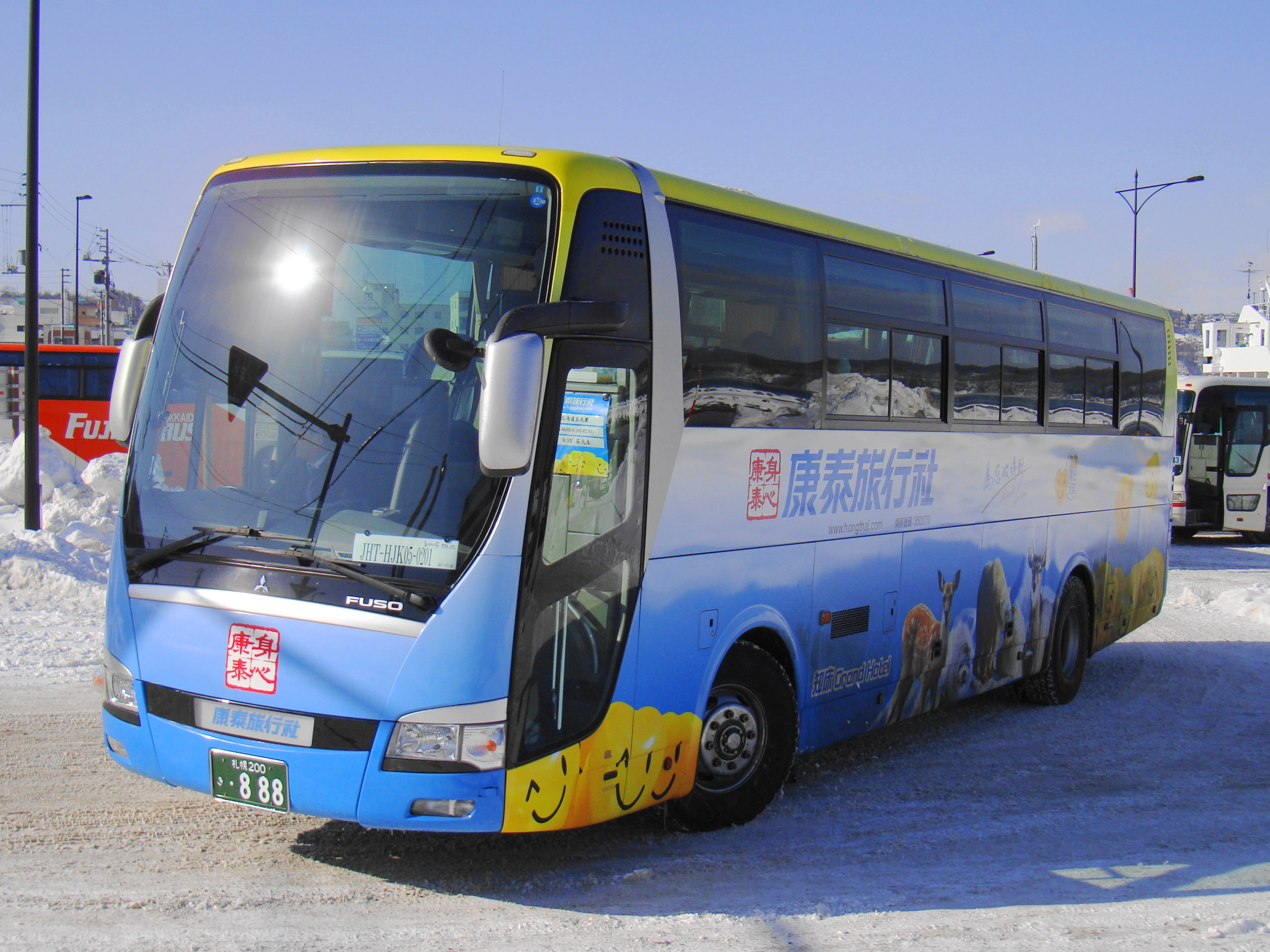
- Hong Thai Travel exclusive bus (Hokkaido, Japan)
- Type: Tour operator
- Industry: Tourism
- Founded: 1966 in Hong Kong
- Defunct: October 28, 2022
- Key people: Jackie Wong, founder

Hong Thai Travel Services
- Chinese: 康泰旅行社
Transcriptions
Standard Mandarin
- Hanyu Pinyin: Kāngtài Lǚxíngshè
Yue: Cantonese
- Jyutping: hong1 taai3 leoi5 hang4 se5

Hong Thai Travel Services (Chinese: 康泰旅行社) was one of the largest travel agencies in Hong Kong. It was founded in 1966 and at its peak had employees in more than 30 sales offices, located in Hong Kong, Macao, China (Guangdong Province), United States, Canada, Thailand and Taiwan.

== History ==
Hong Thai Travel Services was founded in Hong Kong by Jackie Wong See Sum (黃士心) in 1966. Its primary business was booking of airline tickets, ferry tickets and offering services for inbound tourism. Its director was Jackie Wong See Sum and its general manager was his son Jason Wong Chun Tat (黃進達). The father-and-son pair ceased to be primary shareholders in 2011, when they sold Hong Thai's majority of shares to HNA Group, who sold Hong Thai to the Chinese tourism service group Caissa Tosun (凯撒旅业) in a 2019 restructuring. Under the backdrop of the COVID-19 pandemic, Caissa Tosun liquidated Hong Thai in October 2022, citing its negative net asset value of over 68 million Chinese yuan reported by the end of June.

== Incident ==
On August 23, 2010, a twelve-hour-long hostage incident on one of the company's buses in Manila, Philippines, occurred. Twenty-five people, part of a tour group from Hong Kong, were taken hostage on a bus by the gunman, Rolando Mendoza, a former police officer. Eight of them were killed, seven injured while six left the scene unharmed. Mendoza was shot in the head and killed by the police.
