= Manila hostage crisis =

2010 bus hijacking and mass murder in Manila, Philippines

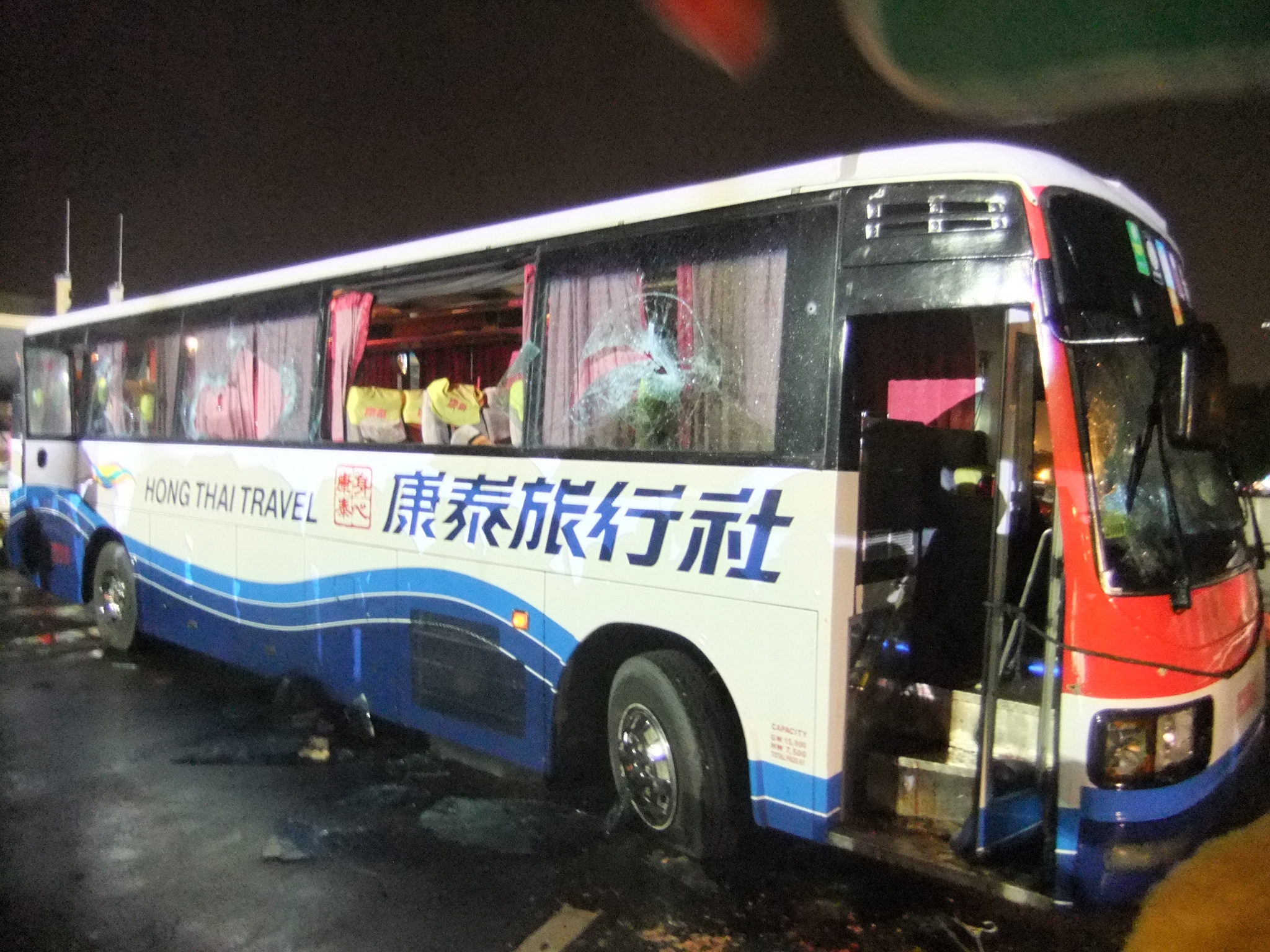
- The bus involved in the hostage crisis
- Location: 14°34′48″N 120°58′28″E; Quirino Grandstand, Rizal Park, Manila, Philippines
- Date: August 23, 2010; 16 years ago 10:00 a.m. – 9:00 p.m. (UTC+08:00)
- Target: Hong Kong tourists on board a bus
- Attack type: Hostage crisis, siege, mass murder, mass shooting
- Weapons: Elisco XM16E1 rifle; .45-caliber Colt Government handgun; Knife (unused)
- Deaths: 9 (including the perpetrator)
- Injuries: 9 (7 hostages and 2 bystanders)
- Perpetrator: Rolando del Rosario Mendoza
- Motive: Reinstatement as a senior police officer and job benefits

Manila hostage crisis
- Traditional Chinese: 馬尼拉人質事件
- Simplified Chinese: 马尼拉人质事件
Transcriptions
Standard Mandarin
- Hanyu Pinyin: Mǎnílā rénzhì shìjiàn
Yue: Cantonese
- Jyutping: maa5 nei4 laai1 jan4 zi3 si6 gin2
Southern Min
- Hokkien POJ: Má-nî-lá jîn-chit sū-kiāⁿ

The Manila hostage crisis, officially known as the Rizal Park hostage-taking incident (Tagalog: Pagbibihag ng bus sa Maynila), took place in Rizal Park, Manila, Philippines, on August 23, 2010. A tourist bus carrying 25 people, consisting of 21 Hong Kongers and four Filipinos, was hijacked by 55-year-old Rolando Mendoza, a former officer of the Philippine National Police. Mendoza claimed that he had been unfairly dismissed from his job, and demanded a fair hearing to defend himself.

Negotiations (which were broadcast live on television and the internet) led to the release of nine hostages, but broke down dramatically about ten hours into the stand-off, when the police arrested Mendoza's brother, who had been brought to the site as part of negotiations, for carrying a gun and thus incited Mendoza to open fire, killing eight hostages. The bus driver managed to escape, and declared "Everyone is dead" (patay na lahat) before he was moved away by policemen. Minutes later, police stormed the bus through a broken back window and fatally shot Mendoza.

The Philippine and Hong Kong governments conducted separate investigations into the incident. Both inquiries concluded that the Philippine officials' poor handling of the situation caused the eight hostages' deaths. The assault mounted by the Manila Police District (MPD), and the resulting shoot-out, have been widely criticized by pundits as "bungled" and "incompetent", and the Hong Kong Government has issued a "black" travel alert for the Philippines as a result of the incident.

Several of Mendoza's family members and Manila Mayor Joseph Estrada apologized to Hong Kong for the incident, while President Benigno Aquino III "begged for understanding" from Hong Kong. President Aquino, however, would decide against issuing a formal apology to Hong Kong or China due to the incident being "the act of one individual", which should "not be construed as the act of the entire country". On April 12, 2018, Philippine president Rodrigo Duterte publicly apologized for the incident on behalf of his country.

== Hijacking ==
=== Boarding ===
Locations of key places during the hostage crisis. Rizal Park is about 10 km away from the Office of the Ombudsman.

On the morning of August 23, 2010, Mendoza attempted to board a Hong Thai Travel Services tour bus as it was taking on riders. Mendoza requested a free ride, and when he was declined by the driver, Mendoza brandished a weapon, handcuffed the driver to the steering wheel and hijacked the bus. There are conflicting reports as to whether Mendoza boarded in front of Quirino Grandstand at Rizal Park, or at Fort Santiago; a number of witnesses saw a man answering Mendoza's description boarding the bus at the latter location.

Mendoza, armed with a handgun and an M16 rifle, commandeered the tour bus, demanded reinstatement to his previous post with benefits, and claimed he was framed. Alfredo Lim, Mayor of Manila, said he would grant Mendoza's wish to be reinstated if he could prove his case.

Masa Tse Ting-chunn, the bus's tour guide, immediately called his agency in Hong Kong shortly after 10:30 am. During the two-minute conversation, Tse calmly informed the customer services manager that his group was being held hostage. Initial media reports were confusing and contradictory; the suspect was alternatively identified as "Ronaldo", "Rolando" and "Reynaldo"; and the hostages aboard were initially reported to be South Koreans before they were confirmed to be mostly from Hong Kong.

=== Negotiations ===
Almost an hour later, six Hong Kong tourists were freed: an elderly couple, a woman with two young children, and a 12-year-old boy. Two Filipino photographers boarded the bus as volunteer hostages in exchange for the releases.

By noon, three additional hostages, including the Filipino tour guide and the two photographers who volunteered to be taken hostage, had also been released. TV5 news anchor Erwin Tulfo remained in contact with Mendoza, while superintendent Orlando Yebra and chief inspector Romeo Salvador led negotiations. Seventeen people remained on the bus. By this time, television channels all over the world were interrupting their programs with non-stop live coverage of the hostage situation. Philippine television stations ABS-CBN, GMA, TV5 and government-run NBN (now PTV), as well as Hong Kong television station TVB, and television news channels RT, Al Jazeera, France 24, BBC World News, MSNBC, Fox News Channel, and CNN, all provided live coverage. However, because the news networks were filming police activity, and the bus was equipped with a television, the gunman was able to watch the police action and determine the locations of snipers. At around 2 pm, Mendoza posted several notes on the windows, which read "A big mistake to correct. A big wrong decision", "Big deal will start after 3:00 pm today" and "3:00 pm Today deadlock".

Shortly after sundown, the Office of the Ombudsman denied Mendoza's request to be reinstated to the police force, but assured him that his case would be reopened. Manila Vice-Mayor Isko Moreno delivered the Ombudsman's letter to the hostage scene. Mendoza called the Ombudsman's decision "garbage", claiming that it did not answer his demands. Mayor Lim later claimed on local radio that authorities had agreed to reinstate Mendoza to bring an end to the crisis, but had not been able to deliver the message due to bad traffic congestion.

When the Manila Police District (MPD) SWAT team arrived, Mendoza declared in a radio interview with DZXL that he would kill the passengers if the SWAT team did not leave. His brother, SPO2 Gregorio Mendoza, walked out after trying to negotiate with him. He urged Mendoza to surrender peacefully, saying, "Nothing [bad] will happen here." Gregorio Mendoza was then arrested for breaching the exclusion zone while carrying a gun, as he did not have the MPD's approval to assist in the negotiations. President Aquino later said that the gunman's brother had contributed to the deterioration of the situation by fanning Mendoza's hatred of the negotiators.

=== Assault ===
Mendoza became agitated when he witnessed live coverage of his brother's arrest from the bus television. Reports indicated that Mendoza fired warning shots as he saw his brother being carried away. Mendoza demanded that the police release his brother, or else he would start executing hostages, and a few minutes later claimed on live radio that he had, indeed, already shot two hostages.

The first shots fired from within the bus were heard at about 7:21 pm. At around the same time, it was reported that snipers had shot the tires immobilizing the bus after it had attempted to move. Mendoza first killed Masa Tse, the tour leader whom he had handcuffed to the door handrail earlier. According to survivor Joe Chan Kwok-chu, several hostages tried to rush Mendoza as he was preparing to shoot the other hostages, but he shot them down before they could reach him.

At around 7:30 pm, bus driver Alberto Lubang escaped the bus. Thinking that all remaining hostages had died, Lubang cried "Patay na lahat...!" ("Everyone is dead...!") to the policemen and media. He later admitted that his assumption was based on witnessing Mendoza shoot three hostages and firing additional shots at others.

Mendoza then began shooting the rest of the hostages one by one, aiming at their heads. Amy Leung Ng Yau-woon told of how her husband Ken Leung Kam-wing shielded her with his body and saved her from harm while sacrificing his own life. Similarly, their daughter Jessie Leung Song-yi took two bullets while protecting her older brother, and died as a result. Passenger Joe Chan shielded himself from Mendoza's gunfire with his backpack and survived, but both of his wrists were shattered. Chan's traveling companion was seriously injured by a gunshot to her chin.

The SWAT team started to surround the bus at 7:37 pm. The team failed to enter the bus for nearly an hour. Initial attempts to break the shatter-resistant Plexiglass windows with a sledgehammer failed. At 7:45 pm, a rope was tied to the front doors of the bus, which snapped when they attempted to pull the door open.

After running out of choices, they threw two canisters of tear gas inside and Mendoza stepped out of the bus. Snipers, who had taken positions earlier in the day, ultimately shot Mendoza in the head as he went to exit the bus, killing him instantly and causing his body to hang part way out the window of the bus door. By that time, as a thunderstorm dumped rain on the area, however, four more hostages were confirmed dead, while only six hostages were confirmed alive and not seriously injured. Two other people outside the bus – 47-year-old TVB news crew engineer Wen Ming, and child bystander Mike Campanero Ladrillo – were wounded by stray bullets.

== Victims ==
Six of the surviving hostages were taken to Ospital ng Maynila Medical Center, where two later died; two were taken to the Philippine General Hospital; the remaining seven hostages were taken to Manila Doctors Hospital. There were eight fatalities in total. The 13 survivors had injuries which ranged from minor to substantial.

Because the bus driver Alberto Lubang had escaped the bus minutes before the situation deteriorated, despite his claim that he had been handcuffed to the steering wheel, suspicions arose that he was in fact the gunman's accomplice, which Lubang denied. He claimed to have unlocked his handcuffs using nail cutters. However, on August 27, 2010, Lubang and his family were reported missing and had fled their home, possibly going into hiding. Yet, on September 7, 2010, he was reported to be present at a hearing of the investigative committee.

The list of the eight identified victims included Masa Tse Ting Chunn (謝廷駿), Ken Leung Kam-wing (梁錦榮), his two daughters Doris Leung Chung-see (梁頌詩), 21, and Jessie Leung Song-yi (梁頌儀), 14 (his son Jason Leung Song-xue (梁頌學) was seriously injured) Wong Tze-lam (汪子林) and his wife Yeung Yee-wa (楊綺華) and her sister Yeung Yee-kam (楊綺琴); and Fu Cheuk-yan (傅卓仁).

== Perpetrator ==
Rolando del Rosario Mendoza (January 10, 1955 – August 23, 2010) was born in Naic, Cavite, but resided in Banadero in Tanauan, Batangas. He graduated from the Philippine College of Criminology with a degree in criminology, joined the Integrated National Police (INP) as a patrolman in April 1981. He was decorated 17 times for bravery and honor, and was described by colleagues as hard-working and kind. In February 1986, Mendoza led a group of policemen that accosted a van carrying 13 crates full of money, which former Philippine president Ferdinand Marcos was apparently trying to smuggle out of the country. Mendoza and his team turned the shipment over to authorities, for which he was declared one of the Ten Outstanding Policemen of the Philippines by the Jaycees International that year. By 1991, when the INP became the Philippine National Police, Mendoza had reached the rank of Senior Police Officer 3 in the Western Police District in Manila. In 2005, Mendoza was promoted to Senior Inspector. He was married to Aurora Mendoza and had three children. At the time of the hijacking, one of Mendoza's sons, Bismark, was serving as deputy chief of Bangued police.

On April 9, 2008, hotel chef Christian Kalaw alleged that he was accosted by Mendoza and several other officers. According to Kalaw, the officers had initially approached him over a supposed parking violation before accusing him of being a drug addict and attempting to extort ₱20,000 from his bank's ATM. Kalaw alleged that when he told the policemen that he did not have the money, he was beaten, threatened at gunpoint and forced to ingest methamphetamine, telling Kalaw that he had to pay ₱200,000 or else they would file drug charges against him, with the methamphetamine in his system as proof. Kalaw said the policemen released him after a friend raised ₱20,000 on his behalf. The Office of the Ombudsman found Mendoza and four others guilty of misconduct, and ordered Mendoza's dismissal from the service and the voiding of all his benefits.

In late April 2008, he was relieved as Chief of the Mobile Patrol Unit. In August 2008, the Eighth Division of the Manila Prosecutors' Office vacated the case after Kalaw failed to attend the dismissal proceedings. In October 2008, spending an unofficial 90-day suspension in the Autonomous Region in Muslim Mindanao, the PNP Internal Affairs Service recommended the case be dropped. Mendoza was later dismissed from the police force in February 2009 on charges of extortion. Mendoza's brothers, Gregorio and Florencio, later stated that all his brother wanted was a fair hearing by the Ombudsman, who "never even gave him a chance to defend himself; they [just] immediately dismissed him."

There were later reports that Mendoza was also charged with participation in a 1996 gang rape that took place at Quirino Grandstand, near the later hijacking site, but the case was dismissed when the complainants did not show up in court.

== Aftermath ==
Mendoza was buried in a public ceremony in Tanauan on August 29, 2010, wearing his police uniform, with the coffin draped in the Philippine flag, which drew criticism by the Chinese embassy in Manila.

Donald Tsang, Chief Executive of Hong Kong, offered for the eight victims to be buried in the Tribute Garden (景仰園), a part of Wo Hop Shek Public Cemetery designated for Hongkongers who showed extraordinary acts of bravery to save others. Fu and the three members of the Wong family accepted the offer and were buried at Tribute Garden. On July 1, 2011, Masa Tse, Fu Cheuk-yan and Ken Leung Kam-wing were all posthumously awarded the gold medal for Bravery by the Hong Kong government. Mendoza's parents apologized and begged forgiveness from the Hong Kong government for their son's actions.

=== Investigations by the Philippine government ===
Philippine President Benigno Aquino III inspected the scene of the incident.

President Aquino ordered a thorough investigation, and for a report to be issued within three weeks. The investigation was held by the Post Critical Incident Management Committee (PCIMC), under the auspices of the Joint Incident Investigation and Review Committee (JIIRC), headed by former Secretary of Justice Leila de Lima and Prosecution/Investigation team led by Cielito Celi. As a gesture of transparency towards the Hong Kong government, the Aquino government invited the Hong Kong Police Force to send a team to observe the investigation. De Lima declared a gag order to cover all parties and departments, including the Hong Kong team examining evidence on the ground.

Preliminary results of the official investigation were released on August 31, 2010. Ballistic tests showed that the deceased hostages' wounds were caused by a high-calibre weapon fired from within the coach. Of the 65 recovered M16 rifle cartridges from the coach, 58 came from Mendoza's gun, making it nearly certain that the eight deceased hostages were killed by Mendoza. However, on September 3, 2010, De Lima admitted that the police might have accidentally shot some of the hostages.

After the completion of the initial inquiry on September 15, 2010, the JIIRC traveled to Hong Kong to interview survivors. The report was delivered first to the Chinese embassy in Manila on September 20, 2010, before being released to the general public, in an attempt to "repair the nation's relations with China".

The official report identified eight critical errors of the handling of the hostage crisis:

- Manila Mayor Alfredo Lim failed to properly activate the crisis management committee, depriving the chief negotiator and others of critical information and operational intelligence.
- The authorities were unable to appreciate Mendoza's demands, and there was a lack of communication with and involvement of the Department of Justice.
- Gregorio Mendoza was allowed to join the negotiating team.
- The side-issue of Gregorio Mendoza had been allowed to preoccupy Lim, Rodolfo Magtibay and Chief negotiator Orlando Yebra at a critical moment, setting off a chain of events that led to Mendoza becoming "fatally hostile".
- Lim decided to arrest Gregorio Mendoza.
- Lim and Magtibay were absent from the command post at a crucial time, having a meal, which created a decision-making vacuum.
- "The inefficient, disorganised and stalled assault" took place without "vital information" about the bus. Magtibay rejected an order from the Philippine National Police director for Manila to use the national elite Special Action Force.
- There was no plan for what to do after the assault and the crime scene was not preserved.
- The media covered every single move the PNP (Philippine National Police) did.

The report also recommended administrative or criminal charges for 15 individuals and organizations, including Manila mayor Alfredo Lim, vice-mayor Isko Moreno, Ombudsman, Merceditas Gutierrez, Deputy Ombudsman Emilio Gonzales III, government undersecretary Rico Puno, retired Philippine National Police chief director general Jesus Verzosa, National Capital Region Police Office director Leocadio Santiago Jr., Manila Police District chief superintendent Rodolfo Magtibay, MPD hostage negotiator Orlando Yebra, SWAT Colonel Nelson Yabut and commander Santiago Pascual, journalists Erwin Tulfo and Mike Rogas, and three broadcasting networks.

On March 31, 2011, Deputy Ombudsman Gonzales was dismissed by President Aquino for his "inordinate and unjustified delay" in handling Mendoza's appeal. Gonzales was the first individual to receive direct sanction from the Philippine government in connection with the incident. He appealed the decision, claiming that he was "prejudged guilty before the investigation started". In January 2014, the Supreme Court declared Gonzales' dismissal unconstitutional for violating the independence of the Office of the Ombudsman as provided by the Constitution.

On December 14, 2011, Merceditas Gutierrez affirmed the original 2009 ruling that led to the firing of Rolando Mendoza and four other officers for grave misconduct. The remaining officers filed a motion for reconsideration to the Court of Appeals, which was denied in January 2013.

=== Investigations by the Hong Kong government ===
On August 25, 2010, the bodies of the victims were brought back to Hong Kong on a government-chartered flight. The Coroner decided that an investigation into their deaths should be carried out, and ordered autopsies on all eight bodies. Five bodies were ultimately autopsied; the remaining three were not autopsied by requests from their families.

The Hong Kong Government invited 116 Philippine witnesses to participate in their investigation, which began on February 14, 2011. Among those invited were Gregorio Mendoza, the hostage-taker's brother, Manila mayor Alfredo Lim, Vice-Mayor Isko Moreno, reporters who covered the incident, members of the SWAT team and a number of forensic experts. Lim and Moreno rejected the invitation. They claimed that, rather than conduct another probe, Hong Kong should respect the conclusion of the Philippines' investigation that Mendoza was responsible for the deaths. They claimed that the Hong Kong probe was an encroachment of Philippine sovereignty and independence.

The Hong Kong investigation interviewed 31 witnesses from Hong Kong and 10 from the Philippines. The coroner's five-member jury had to answer "yes", "no", or "uncertain" to a list of 44 statements, a method that was unique to Hong Kong's history and procedures. The narrative verdict found that all eight victims were "unlawfully killed" and blamed the Philippine authorities' incompetent handling of the crisis as a direct cause of their deaths, although it declined to attribute any criminal or civil liability.

=== Compensation issue ===
In August 2011, two survivors of the crisis, Joe Chan Kwok-chu (陳國柱) and Yik Siu-ling (易小玲), along with Tse Che-kin, brother of Masa Tse, met with the Philippine government officials to discuss compensation. Chief executive Donald Tsang refused to intervene, labeling it a civil case. Democratic Party lawmaker James To had assisted Chan and Yik in their plea for legal aid, which was expensive and complicated. During the visit by Manila Mayor Joseph Estrada and Cabinet Secretary Almendras to meet with the victims and Hong Kong officials, the latter had stated that a "token of solidarity" will be given to the victims and their families. It, however, was not officially addressed as compensation money.

In 2014, the Hong Kong government, the Philippine government and victims’ families reached an agreement under which an undisclosed amount of compensation was paid by Manila to the victims' families.

== Reactions ==
=== Chinese government ===
Chinese foreign minister Yang Jiechi stated that he was "appalled" by the event, and sent a team to the Philippines to "deal with the situation". China's state-run Global Times called the Philippines "one of the most chaotic countries in Southeast Asia" following the shootings.

Additionally, the Chinese consul in the Philippines asked for a written statement of accountability from the Philippine government, and rejected the explanation given by President Benigno Aquino III at an August 24, 2010, press conference. Plans for a delegation led by Philippine vice-president Jejomar Binay to visit Beijing and Hong Kong on August 26–27, 2010 to soothe tensions and "explain the hostage incident" was rejected by the Chinese government, pending the outcome of a complete investigation report.

On August 27, 2010, the Chinese embassy in the Philippines expressed anger at the Mendoza family's decision to cover Mendoza's coffin with the Flag of the Philippines during his wake.

=== Hong Kong government ===
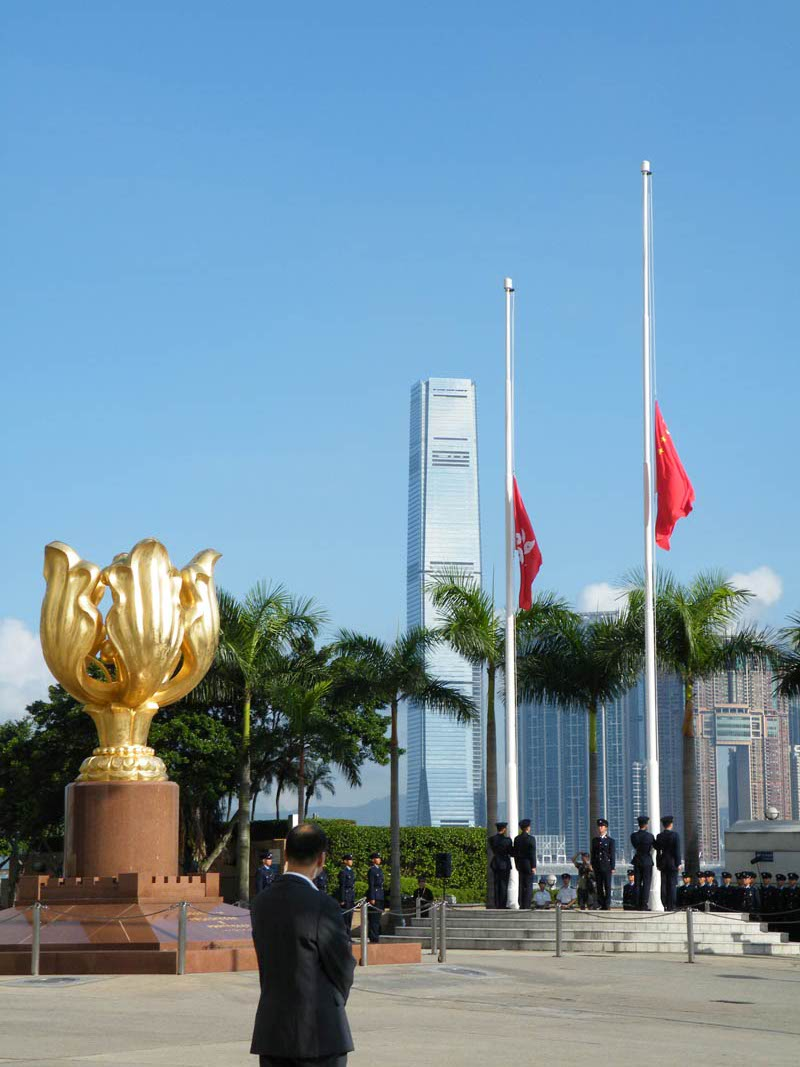
Flag of Hong Kong and Flag of the People's Republic of China both at half-mast on August 26 at Golden Bauhinia Square

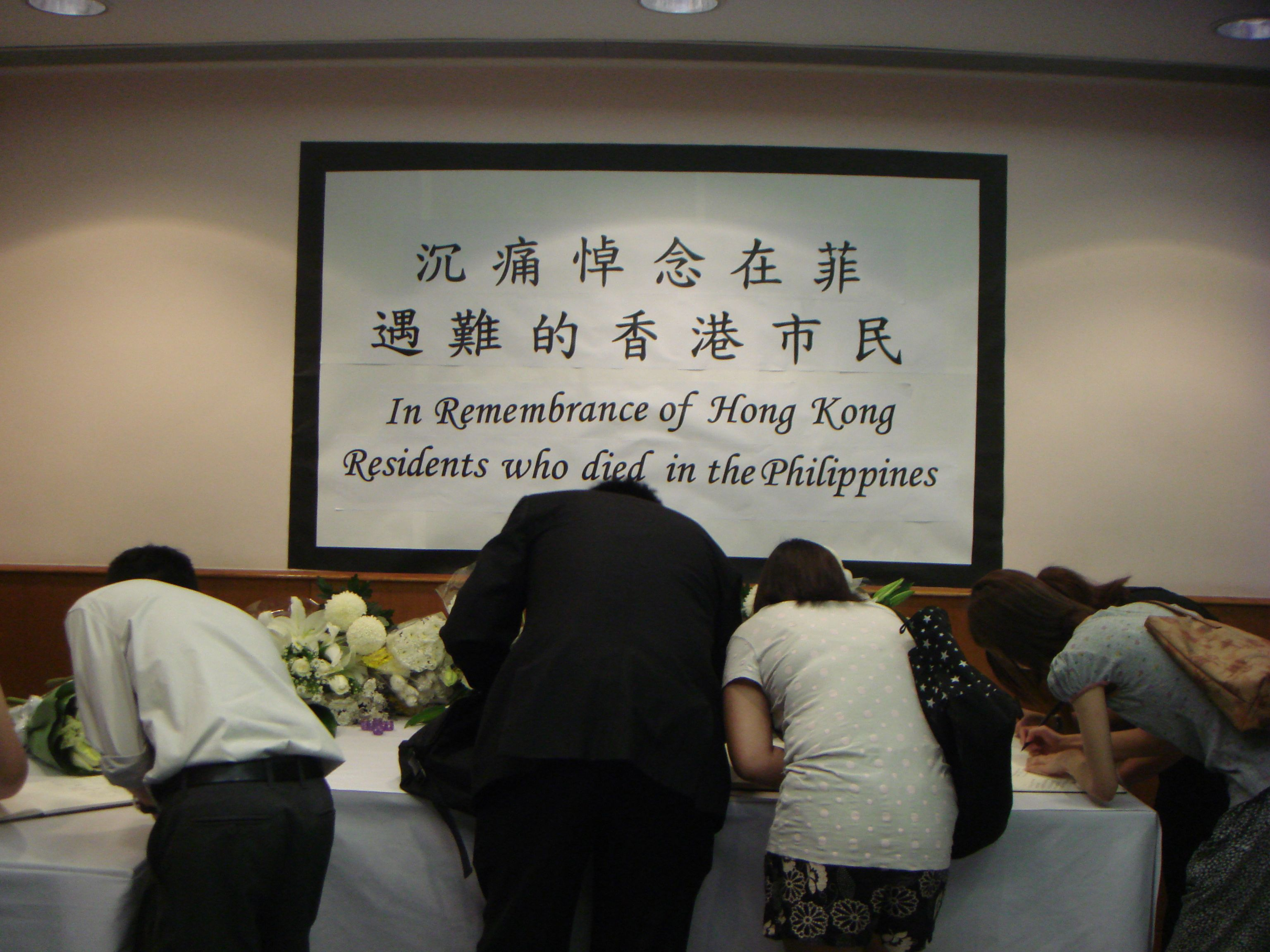
The condolence desk of Mongkok community center, August 26

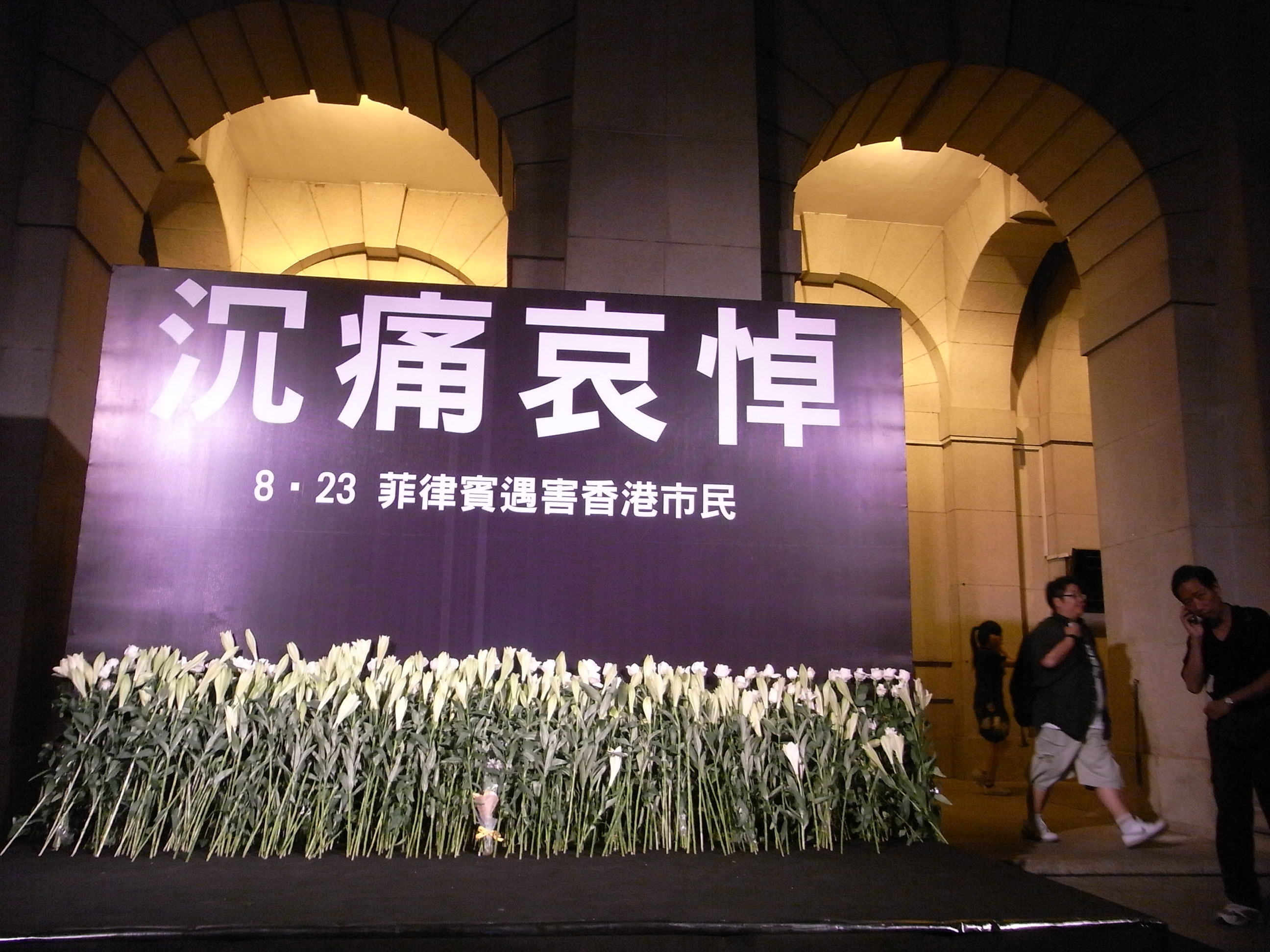
The memorial stage at Statue Square, Central, Hong Kong, August 27

The Hong Kong government had wanted to resolve the hostage situation in a peaceful manner. Its Security Bureau formed a taskforce, and sent officers to Manila to assist the hostage rescue efforts. Immediately following the assault, however, the Security Bureau announced a 'black' outbound travel alert for the Philippines, (this lasted until August 2014) and Hong Kong residents were advised against traveling there, while residents already in the Philippines were advised to return to Hong Kong as soon as possible. Hong Kong officials also announced that visa-free privileges for Philippine diplomats and officials would be revoked after February 5, 2014.

Donald Tsang, the Chief Executive of Hong Kong, offered his condolences to the victims' families, stating that the Chinese government would do anything within its power to aid and rehabilitate the survivors and their families. He complained that he had not been able to get through to President Aquino by telephone during the siege, and criticized the way the siege was handled. The government chartered two airplanes carrying doctors and counsellors to Manila to support the survivors of the incident, and to fly the Hong Kong victims home. The bodies of all eight victims, along with most of the survivors, were returned to Hong Kong on August 25, 2010. A memorial ceremony was held as the victims arrived on the tarmac of Hong Kong International Airport, attended, amongst others, by Chief Secretary for Administration Henry Tang and Secretary for Security Ambrose Lee.

All Hong Kong SAR flags at official locations were lowered to half-mast from August 24 to 26, and the nightly multimedia display "A Symphony of Lights" was suspended to mourn the victims; all Chinese national flags in Hong Kong were also lowered to half-mast. The Hong Kong Stock Exchange held a minute's silence before opening on August 24. The government announced the opening of 18 locations around Hong Kong where citizens could pay their respects and sign condolence books.

A visit by Mayor Estrada and Cabinet Secretary Almendras helped to ease the situation where Hong Kong officials agreed to end sanctions placed on the Philippines.

=== Philippine government ===
President Benigno Aquino III expressed his condolences to the victims and promised a "thorough investigation". While he was not impressed with the manner the police handled the crisis, he defended the actions of the police, stating that the gunman had not shown any signs of wanting to harm the hostages. He also made reference to the Moscow theater hostage crisis, which he said resulted in "more severe" casualties despite Russia's "resources and sophistication". In addition, he declared that the news media may have worsened the situation by giving the shooter "a bird's-eye view of the entire situation".

After Aquino's comments, a number of Hong Kong residents posted angry messages to his official Facebook page, some of which accused Aquino of smiling during the press conference. Aquino subsequently apologized, saying it was an expression of exasperation. On September 5, 2010, Aquino said (in Filipino), "Our problems now, in two or three years we can say that they are laughable when we recall that they were not that grave."

On September 9, 2010, Aquino revealed that he had received a letter from the Hong Kong Government, which gave instructions to the Philippine government in "minute detail"; Aquino regarded the letter as insulting, which the Hong Kong Government denied. As to Donald Tsang's claim that he could not reach Aquino by telephone during the siege, Aquino said that Tsang should have followed protocol in trying to contact him, and claimed that he had tried to contact Tsang the next day.

The decision to arrest Mendoza's brother during the negotiation process was questioned. Manila Police District director Rodolfo Magtibay said that Mayor Lim, as head of the crisis management committee, gave the order to arrest Gregorio Mendoza – a move which caused distress in the gunman and allegedly triggered him to shoot the hostages. Manila Vice-Mayor Isko Moreno told CNN that Mendoza's brother was guilty of conspiring with the hostage-taker and allegedly helped instigate the shooting.

MPD commander Leocadio Santiago, while agreeing with the decision to put the assault on hold until Mendoza had started shooting hostages, admitted that mistakes were made. Senior Supt. Agrimero Cruz Jr., spokesman for the national police, said five general lapses were observed by the PNP Command Group and Staff: poor handling of the hostage negotiation; side issues and events that further agitated the hostage taker; inadequate planning of the assault, and lack of team capability, skills and equipment; improper crowd control; and non-compliance with media relations procedures in hostage taking. Interior secretary Jesse Robredo, who is in charge of the national police, also admitted problems with how the crisis was handled. Manila Police District director Rodolfo Magtibay, as commander of the rescue operation, took leave and four members of the SWAT team were suspended, pending investigation.

Several members of the House of Representatives condemned the hostage-taking while criticizing how the MPD handled the situation: Representative Gabriel Luis Quisumbing (Lakas-Kampi, Cebu–6th) blamed the non-stop media coverage, saying the live coverage "may have jeopardized police rescue operations on site" and authored a bill to constrain media coverage so as not to hinder or obstruct such rescue efforts. Rodolfo Biazon (Liberal, Muntinlupa) blamed the outcome of the incident on the unclear MPD command structure.

The Philippines planned to send a high-level delegation to China to meet and explain to officials there what happened in the hostage crisis. However, the schedule of this delegation could not be confirmed by Beijing government. Instead, Beijing urged the Philippines to submit a "comprehensive, precise, objective" investigation report.

In his Proclamation 23, President Aquino declared August 25, 2010, a National Day of Mourning for those killed. All Philippine flags at all government institutions, including consulates and embassies worldwide, would be flown half-mast.

A hearing into the crisis was conducted by the Senate Committee on Public Order and Illegal Drugs on August 26. During the hearing, police operatives revealed that Mendoza was reading the letter from the Office of the Ombudsman to an unknown person over the phone before the violence began, and subpoenaed the records of the telephone conversation. It was further revealed that Rodolfo Magtibay, ground commander during the crisis, had an elite team of Special Action Force of the Philippine National Police at his disposal, but chose to utilize the SWAT team instead because his team had successfully rehearsed the storming that afternoon. The counter-terrorist unit from the national police were on standby behind the grandstand; the Philippine Army Light Reaction Company had also offered one of its elite squads, trained in hostage-taking scenarios and fighting Islamist militants in the southern Philippines, but was told by police it was not needed.

On August 30, 2010, a Philippine consulate official in Hong Kong appealed to Filipinos to postpone trips to Hong Kong indefinitely, citing anti-Filipino sentiments in Hong Kong. Claro Cristobal, Philippine Consul General in Hong Kong, said in a radio interview that although Filipinos in Hong Kong could be assured of safety, Filipinos traveling to Hong Kong for vacation may be troubled by angry sentiments there.

=== Other governments ===
Canadian Foreign Minister Lawrence Cannon issued a statement on August 24, 2010, expressing Ottawa's condolences to the families and friends of those who died. The Canadian government confirmed that five hostages, the Leung family, were Canadian nationals.

The British government's Foreign and Commonwealth Office confirmed that the released elderly hostages, Yick-Biu Li and Fung-Kwan Li, both British citizens, were unharmed. Both the British Consulate-General Hong Kong and British Embassy Manila lowered their Union flags to half-mast to honor their former colony on August 25, 2010.

The U.S. embassy in Manila condemned Mendoza for taking "innocent tourists hostages in an effort to redress a professional grievance."

=== Philippine media and public ===
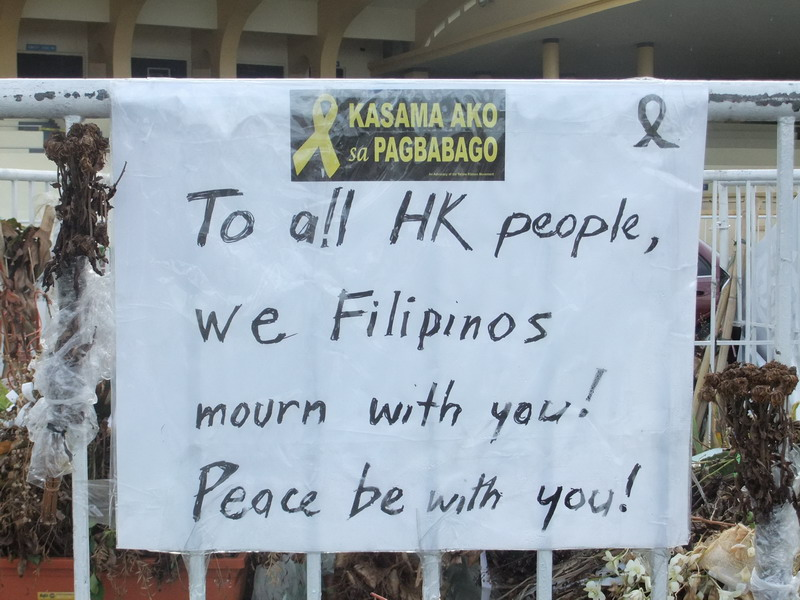
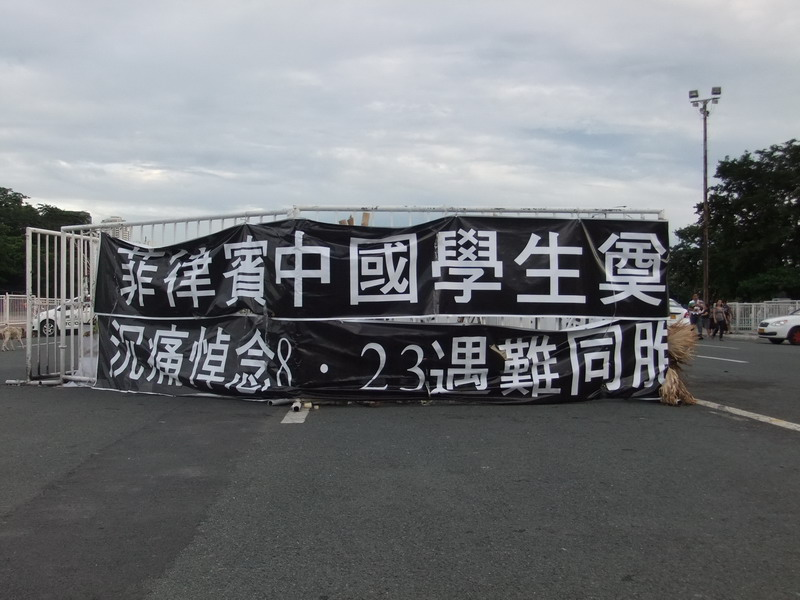
Mourning posters in English (left) and Chinese (right) were hung where the incident occurred.

The aftermath of the hostage crisis was met with shock and dismay throughout the Philippines. Comments ranged from shame, sadness, and sympathy for the hostage victims; anger mixed with a sense of disbelief at the perpetrator Rolando Mendoza, the police force for its apparent bungling, and media for its overzealous coverage; and concern over the damage to the image of the country as a tourist destination and the safety and well-being of Filipinos overseas who might experience backlash over the incident.

Columnist Conrado De Quiros, writing in The Philippine Daily Inquirer, expressed how "deeply, deeply ashamed" he felt over the incident. In a follow-up column, he castigated Mendoza as a "traitor", adding that "to bury him in a pauper's grave will insult paupers". Columnist Alex Magno in The Philippine Star wrote about the "immaturity" of the diplomatic response of the newly installed Aquino administration in what was commonly seen as its first serious leadership test of the administration, in its first one hundred days in office. Magno listed a string of mistakes from the administration, starting with how it failed to initiate contact with the Hong Kong government, to how it insulted the Hong Kong Chief Executive by not promptly responding to his call, and then later unilaterally announcing the sending of a high level delegation to the Hong Kong and Chinese governments in what Magno interpreted as a damage control measure without first confirming that Hong Kong and the PRC would receive the delegation. Magno sees the Chinese as responding with the diplomatic equivalent of "the penalty of death by a thousand cuts." John Nery writing in The Philippine Daily Inquirer said it was indeed appropriate for Aquino to have kept his distance from the crisis management, despite the hands-on approach the general public was demanding with hindsight; he said the skepticism directed towards the Aquino administration was not being applied equally to the Tsang administration's account of trying unsuccessfully to reach Aquino since 4 pm. Analysts agreed that the Aquino administration's approval rating would fall, if not for the handling of the hostage taking crisis, then from a natural move off the high it was coming from.

Manila Mayor and Former President of the Philippines, Joseph Ejercito Estrada's journey to Hong Kong has been met with good reception from the public, although there were others who objected to his trip since President Aquino should have done the trip as head of state.

Then-President Rodrigo Duterte made a formal apology for the crisis during his official trip to Hong Kong on April 12, 2018.

=== Hong Kong media and public ===
Most Hong Kong newspapers reported the Manila assault on front pages; some local newspapers changed their logo colors to black on their front covers. The Manila police and the Philippines government were strongly criticized for their handling of the situation. All television channels in Hong Kong broadcast devoted significant coverage to the hijacking, and its aftermath. Wall-to-wall live coverage, between 6 pm and 9 pm, made it the single incident with the most live television news coverage in Hong Kong since the September 11 attacks. Google displayed a plain white Google Doodle on google.com.hk out of respect for the dead on August 24.

Apple Daily, which likened the Philippine police to a troop of Boy Scouts in terms of competence, also criticized the Chinese government for acting too slowly to protect lives. The Hong Kong Economic Journal criticized the Manila Police for their "appalling professional standards, and the lack of strategic planning"; The Standard said Philippine authorities were accountable.

The Sun pointed out there was a lone counsel in Manila acting on behalf of China until after the siege had ended, and speculated that more hostages could have been saved had higher-level diplomatic pressure been applied earlier.

In light of the hostage incident, considerable public anger was vented against the Philippine authorities. In Hong Kong, there was concern about anti-Filipino sentiments. A text message circulated widely among Filipinos said that 30 Filipino domestic workers had been sacked, with another rumor that a Filipino national in Hong Kong was killed in a stabbing or acid attack, but Claro Cristobal, Philippine consul general in Hong Kong, dismissed the reports as unreliable and unsubstantiated, but that consulate would still look into any complaints. Cristobal said that two domestic helpers out of more than 100,000 were sacked but for reasons completely unrelated to the hostages incident. He said stories about hate-induced violence would only aggravate the situation and that violence against Filipinos in Hong Kong was unlikely to occur as a result of the incident. Meanwhile, Jinggoy Estrada, son of former president Joseph Estrada, said that an immigration officer rudely threw his passport at him after checking it when he passed through Hong Kong Immigration. However, according to security footage, Estrada entered Hong Kong through the privileged passage for diplomats, accompanied by staff from the Philippine Embassy. Cameras covering both sides clearly recorded and showed that his passport was properly handed back to a person among his entourage.

Lee Ying-chuen, one of seven survivors in the crisis, wrote an open letter urging Hong Kong people to help Filipinos fight for a better society and justice, and not to see them as scapegoats for their corrupt government. On August 28, 2010, a candlelight vigil with a thousand participants was held in Hong Kong to mourn the victims. Legislators from different political parties organized a march on August 29, which according to organizers, was attended by about 80,000 people; the police gave a figure of 30,000. 400 Filipinos also held a vigil for the victims in Chater Gardens on August 29.

Following their handling of the crisis, public support for Donald Tsang rose to a two-year high, and that in other government officials also surged, according to a survey by the University of Hong Kong. Satisfaction in the government rose 10.6 percentage points.

=== Pundits' criticism of rescue operation ===
A pundit interviewed on the main evening news in Hong Kong criticized the Philippine National Police for lack of planning and strategy for negotiating with the hostage-taker. The response to the rapid deterioration of the situation caught the police off-guard; the hour-long assault on the coach was also described by a security expert as "extremely risky to the hostages". Security analyst Charles Shoebridge praised the SWAT team's courage but criticized the police for lack of determination, equipment, training and element of surprise; for not taking the opportunity to disarm or shoot Mendoza; for not satisfying Mendoza's demands; for not blocking off televised proceedings, for not safeguarding the public and for using Gregorio Mendoza in the negotiation. Romeo Acop, a former director of the Philippine National Police's Criminal Investigation and Detection Group, was also critical of the police for failure to establish an isolation line, slowness in addressing Mendoza's demands, failure to deploy the Special Action Force, poor negotiating team and skills, absence of an officer to control the media, and lack of actual experience.

In France, retired Colonel Frédéric Gallois, commander of the Groupe d'Intervention de la Gendarmerie Nationale (GIGN) from 2002 to 2007, after watching live television footage was quoted by Agence France-Presse (AFP) as saying that "one cannot understand what justified this badly prepared and risky assault", and further commented that the SWAT team lacked specialist training, equipment and tactical competence.

== Dramatization ==
The hostage crisis is dramatized in the episode "Hostage Crisis Massacre" of the American television documentary series National Geographic Investigates produced by Partisan Pictures and National Geographic Channel.

In the documentary, the director Micah Fink, clarifies elements of the crisis left unclear by media response. "Mr. Mendoza staged a media event, just like the gunmen in Mumbai," he said in an interview for the Wall Street Journal. Sensationalism is a major theme in this documentary, according to this interview.

Former FBI Deputy Assistant Director and hostage rescue expert Danny Coulson, who was also a subject in the documentary, reiterates how "Even when there is a system in place to deal with these things, things can still go wrong."

== See also ==
- Noynoying
- List of hostage crises
- 2020 Greenhills hostage crisis
- 2007 Manila hostage crisis
- 2004 Granby, Colorado, bulldozer rampage
- 1995 San Diego tank rampage
- Bus 174 hijacking
- Cologne hostage crisis
- Gladbeck hostage crisis
- 2020 Lutsk hostage crisis
- Nishi-Tetsu bus hijacking
