= 1993–1995 Salvadoran legislature attacks =

- Part of the aftermath of the Salvadoran Civil War
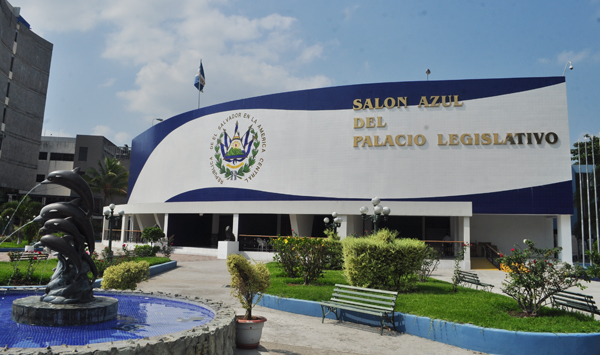
- The Legislative Assembly, as seen in 2014, where the attacks and hostage crises occurred
- Date: First attack: 1993; Second attack: July 1994; Third attack: 26–28 September 1994; Fourth attack: 24–26 January 1995
- Location: Blue Chamber of the Legislative Assembly, San Salvador, El Salvador; 13°42′22″N 89°11′58″W
- Goals: Procurement of financial compensation for veterans of the Salvadoran Civil War
- Methods: Legislature breaching, hostage taking
- Result: Mediated agreements resulting in protestors standing down and releasing all hostages

Parties
Association of Demobilized Members of the Armed Forces of El Salvador	Government of El Salvador; Legislative Assembly; ONUSAL (mediation)

Lead figures
Uncentralized leadership	(El Salvador) Armando Calderón; (El Salvador) Gloria Salguero

Casualties and losses
1 killed; 2 injured	213+ taken hostage
- 2,500 laborers taken hostage

From 1993 to 1995, former soldiers of the Armed Forces of El Salvador (FAES) stormed the Legislative Assembly of El Salvador on four occasions demanding financial compensation for their service during the Salvadoran Civil War of 1979 to 1992. The attacks occurred in 1993, July 1994, September 1994, and January 1995. In the latter who attacks, the former soldiers took hundreds of hostages, including legislators of the Legislative Assembly.

== Background ==
On 16 January 1992, the government of El Salvador and the rebel Farabundo Martí National Liberation Front (FMLN) signed the Chapultepec Peace Accords that ended the Salvadoran Civil War that began in 1979. Among other things, the peace accords mandated the restructuring of El Salvador's security forces. The National Police, National Guard, and Treasury Police were dissolved and replaced with the National Civil Police (PNC). Several divisions and units of the Armed Forces of El Salvador (FAES), such as the Rapid Deployment Infantry Battalions, were dissolved.

Around 35,000 government soldiers and police officers were discharged, some of whom were replaced by FMLN combatants or non-combatants in compliance with the peace accords.

== Attacks ==
=== 1993 attack ===
In 1993, former FAES soldiers stormed the Legislative Assembly of El Salvador.

=== July 1994 attack ===
In July 1994, former FAES soldiers stormed the Legislative Assembly of El Salvador. They demanded that the government grant demobilized soldiers indemnities for their service during the civil war. The situation was peacefully resolved following mediation by the United Nations Observer Mission in El Salvador (ONUSAL) where the Salvadoran government agreed to issue payments for the demanded indemnities.

=== September 1994 attack ===
On 26 September 1994, hundreds (Note: Sources conflict how many former FAES soldiers stormed the Legislative Assembly in September 1994. Sources state that either 50 (contemporary El País reporting), 300 to 500 (United Nations High Commissioner for Refugees), or around 1,000 (United Nations Economic and Social Council) former soldiers stormed the legislature.) of former FAES soldiers affiliated with the Association of Demobilized Members of the Armed Forces of El Salvador (ADEFAES) armed with sticks and machetes stormed the Legislative Assembly. They demanded an indemnity of US$1,450 (equivalent to $3,150 in 2025) and an allotment of land for each former soldier and an additional bonus for those who engaged in rural combat against the FMLN. The former soldiers took 200 people hostage, but eventually released most until around 29 people (Note: Sources conflict how many deputies were held hostage in September 1994. Sources state that either 22 (contemporary El País reporting), 28 (United Nations High Commissioner for Refugees), or 29 (United Nations Economic and Social Council) deputies were taken hostage.) remained, all of whom were deputies (legislators) of the Legislative Assembly. The attack occurred while Calderón Sol was attending a session of the United Nations General Assembly.

The deputies taken hostage inside the Legislative Assembly formed a commission to negotiate with the former soldiers. At the same time, another commission that involved Salvadoran government officials and members of ONUSAL offered to negotiate with the former soldiers on the condition that they withdraw from the Legislative Assembly, a condition that the former soldiers refused. After 48 hours, the former soldiers agreed to peaceful resolve the hostage crisis when the Salvadoran government agreed to review the case of every former soldier individually and to expand benefits to former civil defense members. Although there was no official amnesty for those involved, the government called for no legal action to be taken against the former soldiers, but some deputies who were taken hostage filed lawsuits.

=== January 1995 attack ===
On 3 January 1995, ADEFAES led a protest demonstration in front of the Legislative Assembly calling on the legislature to fulfill its commitments to the country's former soldiers. On 24 January, 6,000 ADEFAES-affiliated former soldiers armed with sticks and machetes attacked the Legislative Assembly, the Ministry of Finance, and other Salvadoran government buildings. They also blocked streets and took 2,500 laborers and 13 deputies as hostages. During the initial attack, police killed one former soldiers and injured two others. On 25 January, representatives from several Salvadoran political parties issued a joint statement condemning ADEFAES' actions and called for it to release hostages. On 26 January, ADEFAES agreed to end its occupations of government buildings after the Salvadoran government reiterated that it would pay out indemnities to former soldiers.

== Aftermath ==
ADEFAES members attacked and occupied the Institute of Agrarian Transformation for six hours in August 1995 demanding that the government allow former soldiers to receive larger loans. They vacated the building after the arrival of riot police, and the Salvadoran government responded by promising to accelerate the allocation of lands to former soldiers.

== See also ==
- 2020 Salvadoran political crisis
- List of attacks on legislatures
- List of hostage crises
