= 2020 Greenhills hostage crisis =

Hostage-taking in San Juan, Metro Manila, Philippines

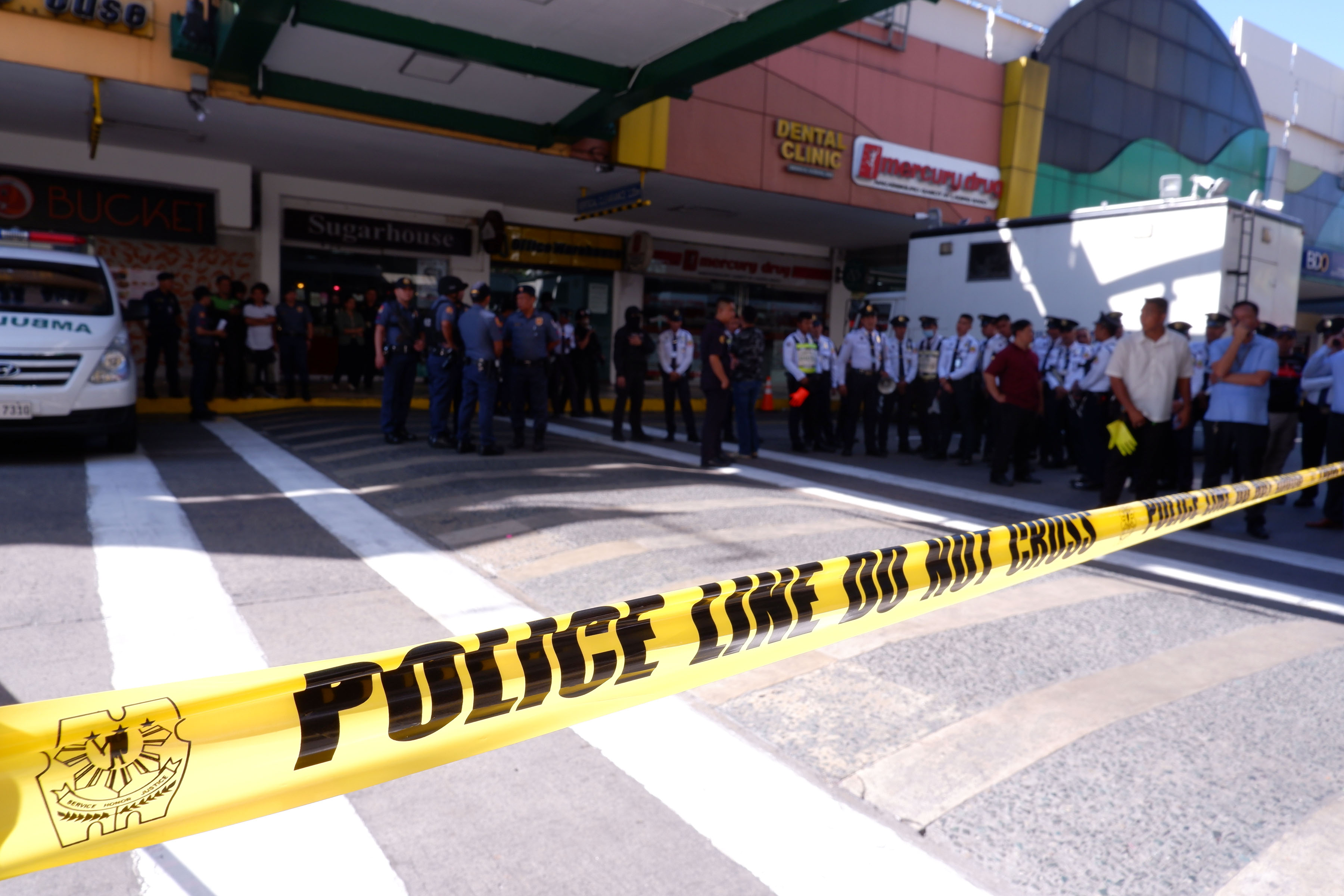
- The Virra Mall at the Greenhills Shopping Mall under police lockdown during the hostage taking.
- Location: 14°36′08.4″N 121°03′00.3″E; Virra Mall, Greenhills Shopping Center, Greenhills, San Juan, Metro Manila, Philippines
- Date: March 2, 2020 (PST, UTC+8)
- Attack type: Hostage taking
- Deaths: None
- Injuries: 1
- Victims: 55 captives not including the sole injury
- Perpetrator: Alchie Paray
- Motive: To address the alleged corruption and improper labor practice of the hostage taker's former employer
- Charges: Frustrated murder, illegal possession of firearms and ammunition, and serious illegal detention
- Verdict: Guilty

On March 2, 2020, 40-year-old Alchie Paray, who worked as a security guard at the Greenhills shopping mall complex in Greenhills, San Juan, Metro Manila, the Philippines, took 55 people hostage at the administration office on the second floor of the Virra Mall. Paray was an employee of the mall's security agency, Safeguard Armor Security Corporation (SASCOR), and believed he was a subject of unjust termination. During the standoff, Paray demanded the authorities to air his grievances against his former employers. Only one person was injured during the incident, and Paray was arrested after he freed the hostages.

== Background ==
=== Perpetrator ===
Alchie Paray
- Born: Alchie Paray y Pedraza; 1979 or 1980 (age 46–47)
- Occupation: Security guard (formerly)

Alchie Paray is a 40-year-old man who previously worked as a security guard at the Virra Mall as an employee under SASCOR. There were varying accounts regarding the circumstances of his employment with SASCOR. Paray expressed his belief that he was a subject of unjust termination. SASCOR general manager Oscar Hernandez disputed the claims, saying that Paray was not dismissed from employment and was supposed to be reassigned to a different location as part of the company's policy of rotating security guards.

Paray also addressed the rampant corruption in Greenhills.

During the hostage taking, Paray maintained contact with local authorities and the media through his mobile phone and a walkie-talkie.

=== Hostage taking ===
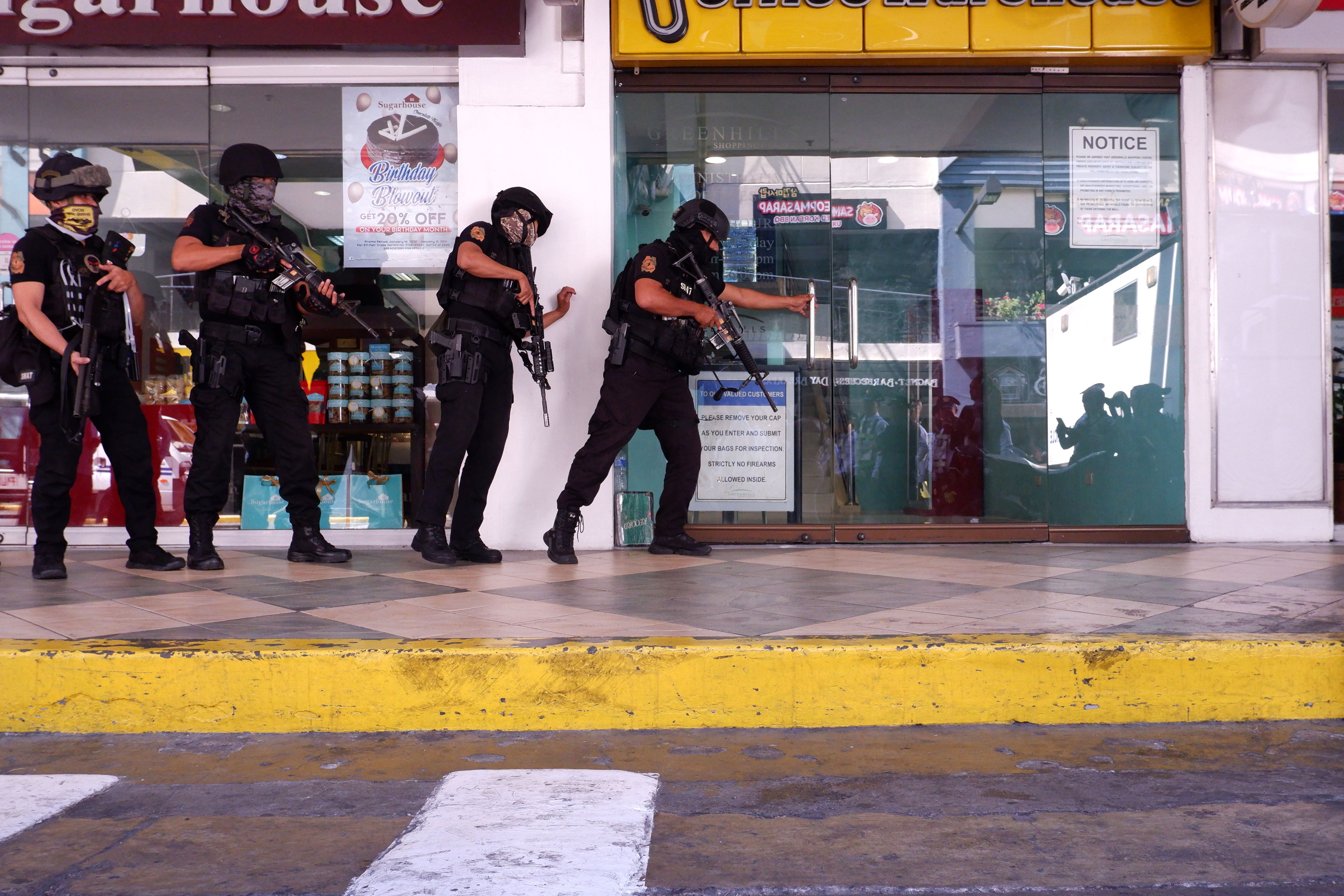
Members of the SWAT division of the Philippine National Police taking position at the hostage taking site.

The hostage crisis began when Paray, armed with a .45 caliber pistol, entered the employees' entrance of the Virra Mall at around 11:14 am. Paray was confronted by a security officer, who he promptly shot twice. The wounded officer was immediately rushed to a hospital as Paray took people at the finance office as hostages. At 11:22 am, the Greenhills management contacted the San Juan city police and within three minutes city police chief Colonel Jaime Santos, a SWAT team, and other officials arrived at the scene.

Paray threatened to kill the hostages and made his first demand: to have all security guards of the mall gather outside the mall. He later demanded to be given media presence. At around 12:30 pm, the police set up a command post inside the Greenhills chapel. The mall was placed under lock down at around 1 pm. At that time the incident was being reported as a shooting incident with the police not yet officially confirming that a hostage taking was underway. San Juan Mayor Francis Zamora and National Capital Region Police Office (NCRPO) chief Debold Sinas arrived at the hostage taking site. At 2:30 pm, the Greenhills management issued a statement publicly confirming the then-ongoing hostage taking. Despite the closure, several onlookers still managed to gather at the site to film the incident live and give updates about the situation online.

The police began setting up a press conference at 4 pm as part of fulfilling one of the demands of the hostage taker. An hour later, the media was brought in the Greenhills shopping mall complex for a briefing with the police. A video call was made by a police officer to confirm the attendance of representatives of the media including reporters from CNN, GMA, ABS-CBN, and TV5, and representatives from Paray's former employer, SASCOR.

At 6:00 pm, six SASCOR officials publicly announced their intention to resign from their post in a bid to appease Paray. In response, Paray demanded that two of them eat ₱2,500 in front of the media. He offered one condition that must be fulfilled to drop that particular demand: for the police to plead with him via the media to not force the act on his two former bosses, a demand with which the police complied.

The hostages were freed at around 8:16 pm. Paray, initially thought to be unarmed, exited with the hostages. Paray then proceeded to air his grievances against his former employers on national television for 20 minutes before the police managed to arrest him at around 8:45 pm.

=== Victims ===
The only injury was the security guard who confronted Paray at the start of the incident. The guard, who was shot twice, was rushed to the Cardinal Santos Medical Center, and was reported to be in stable condition. The 55 hostages were all released unharmed with some expressing the ordeals they've confronted in online social media.

== Aftermath ==
Alchie Paray was charged with frustrated murder, illegal possession of firearms and ammunition, illegal possession of explosives, and serious illegal detention. The police were able to confiscate a .45 caliber pistol, sixteen rounds of ammunition, and a tactical knife from Paray. Paray was also tested for illegal drugs, but the results were negative.

The Department of Labor and Employment (DOLE) was urged to investigate labor-related issues raised by Paray. Senator Joel Villanueva and labor group Defend Jobs Philippines were among those which urged DOLE to launch an investigation. Villanueva condemned the hostage taking and expressed the need to only issue security guard licenses to individuals with "tough mental disposition".

The Philippine National Police placed SASCOR under investigation over the incident.

Paray was sentenced to 6 years in prison in 2021.

== In popular media ==
A documentary about the incident, titled "Grenade-Wielding Former Security Guard Takes Over 50 Hostages In Manila Mall ", was featured in an episode of The Negotiators, produced by CNA.

== See also ==
- 2010 Manila hostage crisis
- 2007 Manila hostage crisis
