= Supreme Court of Justice hostage crisis =

Supreme Court of Justice
- Location: San José, Costa Rica
- Date: April 16, 1993 (GMT-6)

The Supreme Court of Justice Hostage Crisis was a 1993 attack in which five gunmen from a group calling itself the "Death Commando" group took over the Costa Rican Supreme Court in San José on April 26 and held 19 supreme court judges (magistrates) and five administrative employees as hostages.

Four days later, after lengthy negotiations, the 24 hostages were freed and the members of the "Death Commando" were taken to an airport where they were going to take an airplane that would take them to Guatemala. The hostage-takers were captured in a spectacular raid before they were able to board the aircraft.

While early suspicions had existed that they were Colombian guerrillas, it transpired that they were actually Costa Ricans and that one of them wanted money for a liver transplant.

== See also ==
- List of hostage crises
- Palace of Justice siege
