= Greenhills (mixed-use development) =

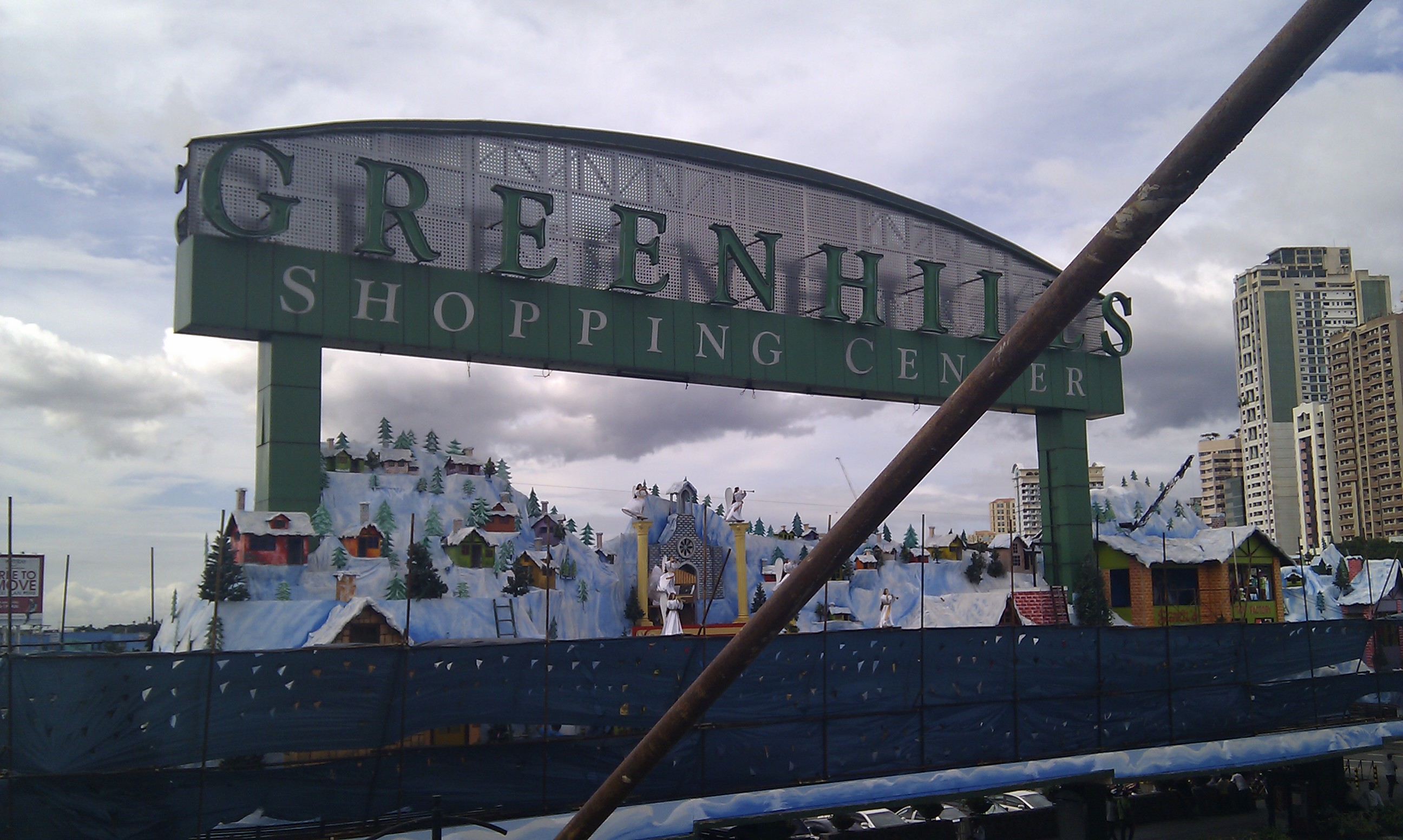
- Location: Greenhills, San Juan, Metro Manila, Philippines
- Coordinates: 14°36′06.26″N 121°02′59.42″E
- Owner: Ortigas & Company (Note: While the Promenade and Theater Mall buildings were built in the same complex under the shopping center, it was previously managed by the Music Museum Group until December 2023 wherein the management of the mall and cinema areas reverted back to Ortigas Malls, excluding the Teatrino and Music Museum.)
- Num. of stores: 2,000+ (2014)
- Floors: GH Mall: Main Mall: 6 + basement East Wing: 3 South Wing: 3 Other buildings: Virra Mall: 4 Shoppesville: 3 Promenade: 3 (max); Theater Mall: 2 Unimart: 2 (Note: Unimart occupies the first two levels of the 7-level McKinley Parking Building.)
- Public transit: 2 Greenhills; Jeepneys, e-trikes
- Website: greenhills.com.ph

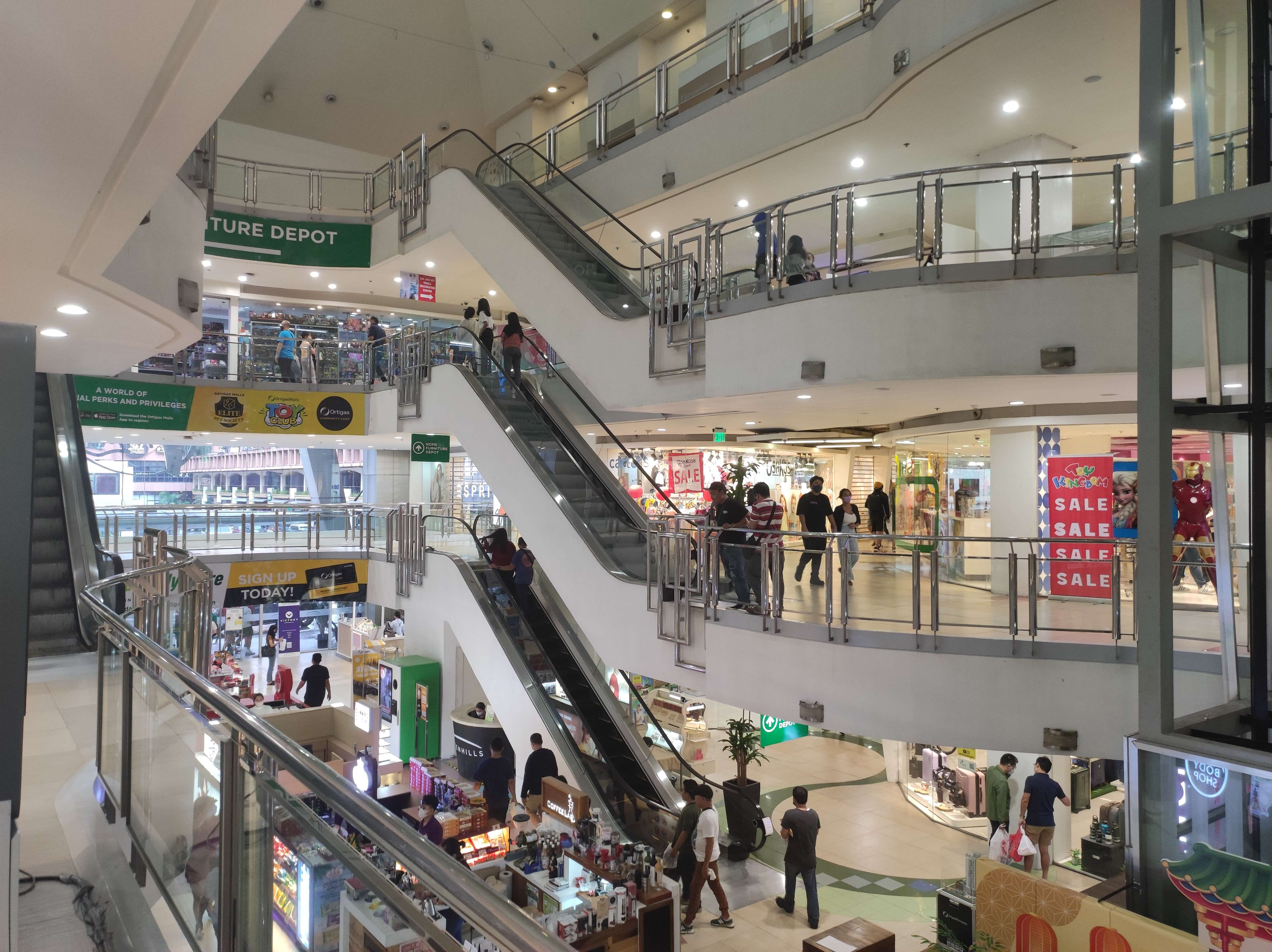
Inside of Virra Mall (as of 2023)

Greenhills, commonly known as the Greenhills Shopping Center, is a 16-hectare (0.16 km^{2}) mixed-use shopping, residential, and leisure development located in San Juan, Metro Manila, Philippines.

Established by Ortigas and Company as the centerpiece shopping center of the Greenhills residential development in the 1970s, it is a mall complex containing more than 2,000 stores and is one of the oldest shopping malls in the country.

== History ==
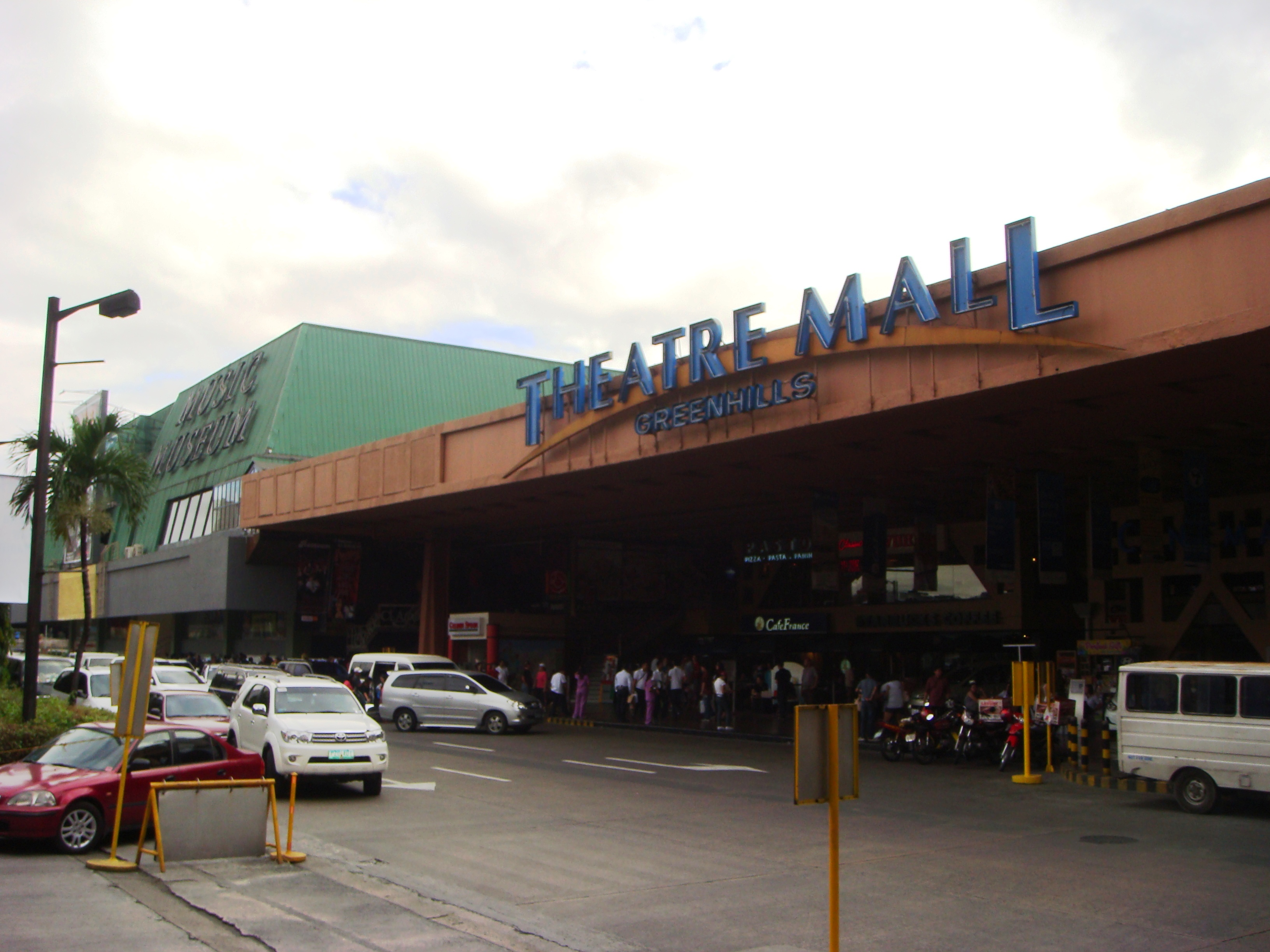
The Greenhills Theatre Mall in 2012

=== Conception ===
In 1966, the plans for building the Greenhills Shopping Center began which followed a two-year study of community development projects in various parts around the world. The concept was presented by Filipino architect Juan Nakpil.

=== 1970s to 1980s ===
The Greenhills Shopping Center opened in the early 1970s and was among the first shopping centers to be established in the Philippines. The shopping complex housed shopping malls, the Virra Mall and Shoppesville, the Manilabank, PCIB (now BDO), Padilla, and Crossroads arcades, Greenhills Theater, Greenhills Bowling Alley, and a supermarket by the name of Unimart. All of these facilities were leased out to other companies except the theater. These companies in turn leased out space to small retailers.

In the 1980s, Greenhills was a place to hang out during the weekends, especially for the youth who often frequented the Virra Mall, to shop, watch movies, dine, visit the video arcades and to go to hobby stores at Shoppesville. Music Hall and Annapolis Live is also frequented. Later tiangges or small stalls began to sprout in Greenhills. They started out in annual bazaars during the Christmas season and eventually increased in numbers and their operations became all-year-round.

=== Redevelopment ===
Logo of Greenhills from 2017 to 2023

Greenhills in 2008.

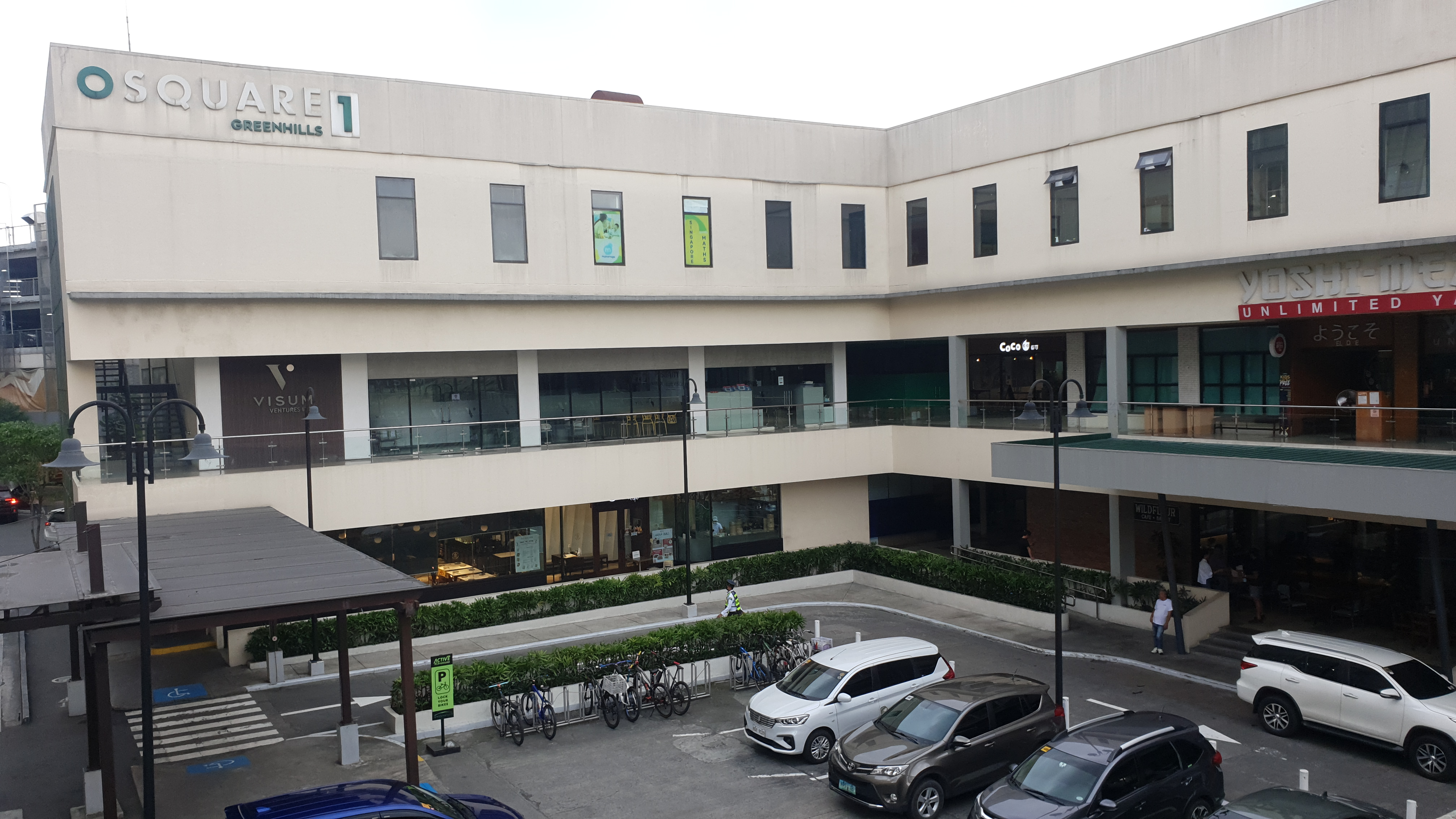
O Square 1

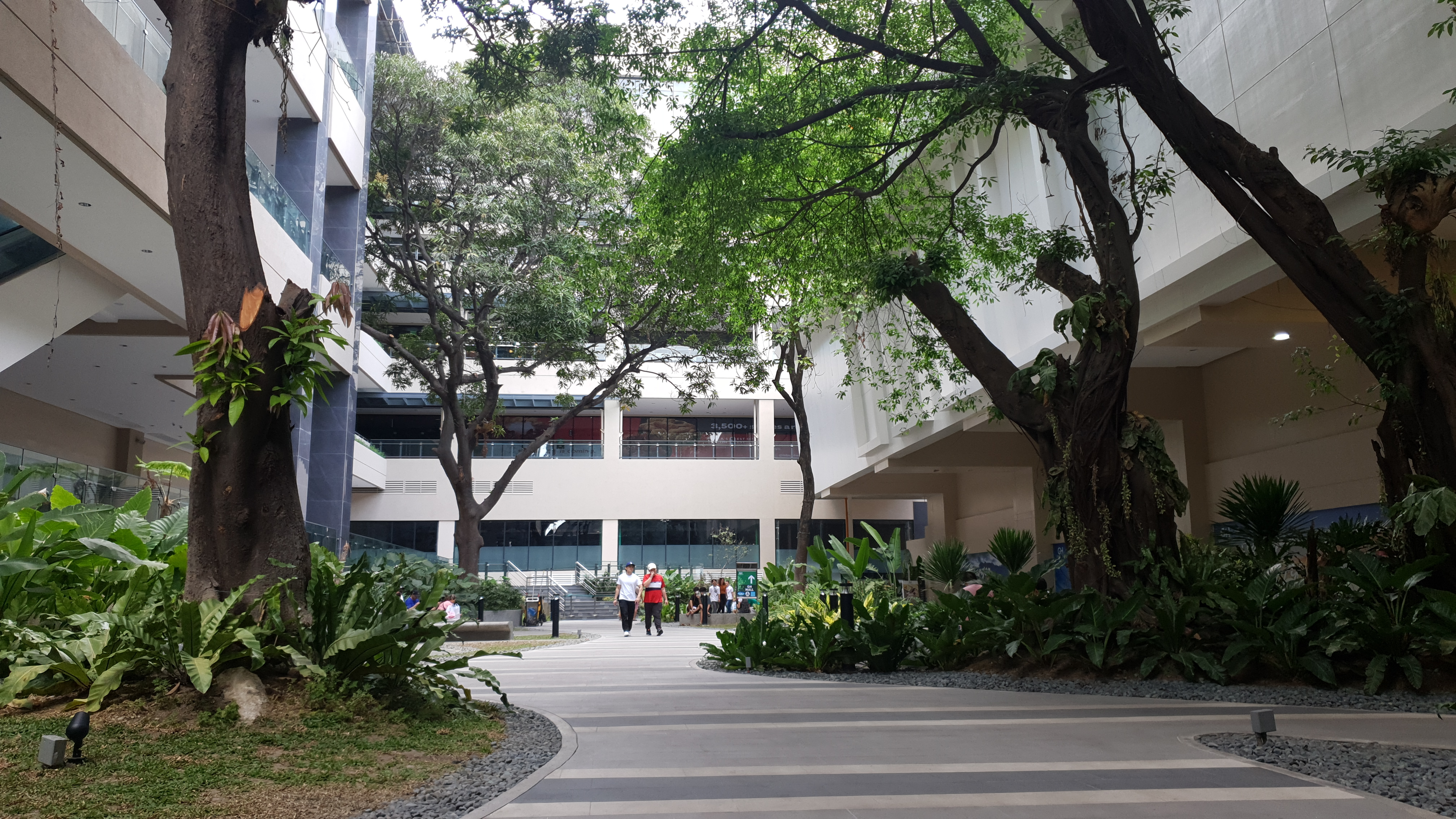
A linear park located in the heart of the mixed-use development.

Most of the lease were expired by 2002, and most of the companies which the facilities were leased to did not make any significant improvements or renovations since their lease contracts were about to expire. Greenhills lost tenants and visitors as other shopping centers opened in other parts of Metro Manila. Ortigas & Company, initially planned to sell the complex but decided against it and started to redevelop the complex themselves. A new management team was set up in late 2001 to facilitate the complex's redevelopment.

Among the first redevelopments was the renovation of the Greenhills Theater into the Greenhills Theatre Mall. The Greenhills Theatre Mall was reopened to the public on January 27, 2002. Previously the facility which houses two theaters, had fallen to near-disuse, occasionally opening only for special event of corporations and Christian fellowships.

The Virra Mall was also renovated from January to December 2005. The former Virra Mall, built in 1975 and sculptural design done by architect José María Zaragoza, was demolished in January 2005 and was reopened in May 2006 as V-Mall. The renovation also resulted in the entry of SM-operated stores such as Ace Hardware, Watsons, and Toy Kingdom, as well as an expansion of the Chapel of the Holy Family.

Another redevelopment project composed of two phase costing around ₱25 billion was started in 2010. The first phase was completed in 2013, with the introduction of more parking and retail space, cinemas and The Viridian, a 53-storey residential condominium, with turnover to residents made in April 2016. The new relocated Unimart, occupying the first two levels (including Anson's) of the new Greenhills Carpark Building built next to the one-storey Unimart site, opened on July 2, 2017. The latter is now the site of the expansion of Greenhills' Main Mall.

The Annapolis carpark has been demolished to give way for the construction of The Connor, its second residential tower in the complex. V-Mall's food court has been closed and is now converted into a new zone with restaurants.

=== Expansion of main mall ===
Greenhills Mall (GH Mall), a new 7-level (100,000 m^{2} (1,100,000 sq ft) GFA) integrated regional mall with a hybrid lifestyle and budget retail format, rising at the former Unimart building, was built to accommodate 150 global brands in addition to 2,000 new tiangge stalls. The new mall is home to six new cinemas (4 prestige + 2 regular), in addition to eight digital cinemas at Greenhills Promenade and Theatre Mall and two new food courts (budget-friendly and upscale Food Hall). It would have three levels of basement parking with 1,300 slots. The expansion mall also serves as the podium of GH Tower, the first office and BPO tower in the area. The East Wing softly opened on November 23, 2023.

Another annex was built at the former Greenhills Lifestyle Center wing. The three-storey mall will host 120 tenants, along with new attractions and lifestyle options that will connect to the rest of the mall area. Originally known as the annex wing, the South Wing of the new GH Mall softly opened on October 11, 2023.

== Visitors ==
Greenhills has been a destination for bargain hunters since the 1970s. In 2003, it was reported that around 90,000 people a day visited the shopping complex, who stayed a few hours to shop and eat. About 80 percent of these shoppers were from 15 to 39 years old, and over half belonged to the middle and higher class, particularly from socioeconomic class A, B, and C. More than half of the shoppers were women.

== Tenants ==
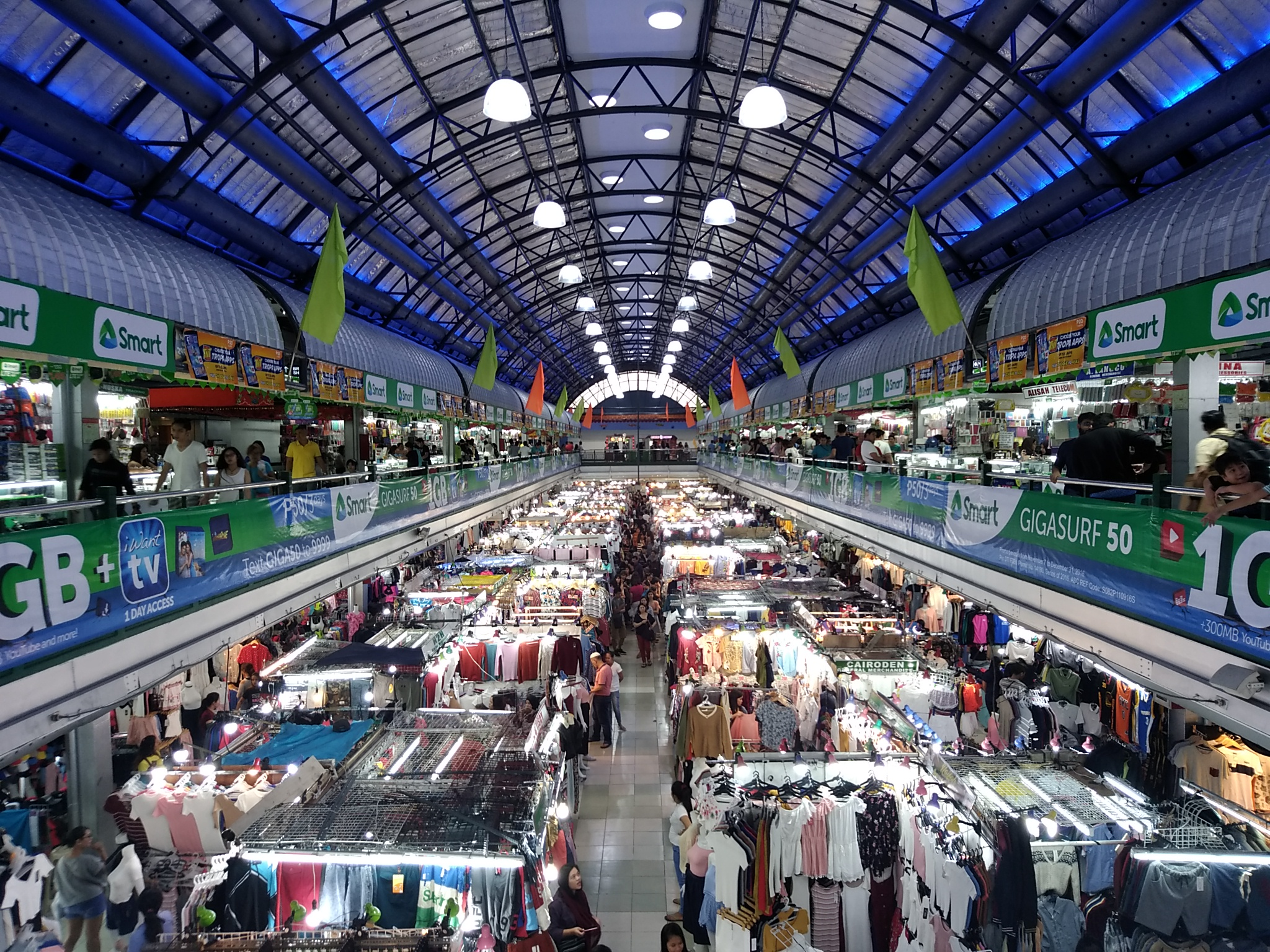
The tiangge area within Greenhills in 2017

Around 2,000 entrepreneurs have stalls and shops within the complex's tiangge or flea market in 2003. On the same year, it is reported that an estimate of 90 percent of all South Sea pearls in the country go through Greenhills with a dedicated Pearl Center within the complex. Most of the pearl traders during this period comes from Marawi, Lanao del Sur in Mindanao. Among the other goods sold within the complex are furniture and clothing.

Major retailers in the country, Bayo, Kamiseta, Bench, Ricky Reyes, Folded & Hung, Gift Gate, Odyssey, Alberto, Astro Vision, Plains & Prints and Celine started as small shops in Greenhills. In addition to this, major food players Jollibee, KFC, McDonald's, Mang Inasal and many other well known food franchise thrive in the area.

A majority of the tenants at the Greenhills Shopping Center are Filipino Muslims of Maranao ethnicity, mainly as refugees of the Moro conflict in Mindanao. The tenants are represented by trade association Greenhills Muslim Traders Association Inc. (GMTA).

The retail center has reputation for being a hub of counterfeit goods. It is listed by the United States Trade Representative as a "notorious counterfeit market" although the management along with the Intellectual Property Office of the Philippines has been coordinating with store owners to have the label removed by 2027. It is listed in USTR's reports since 2018 and is the sole Philippine market listed as of the 2024 edition.

=== Manila Christmas on Display ===
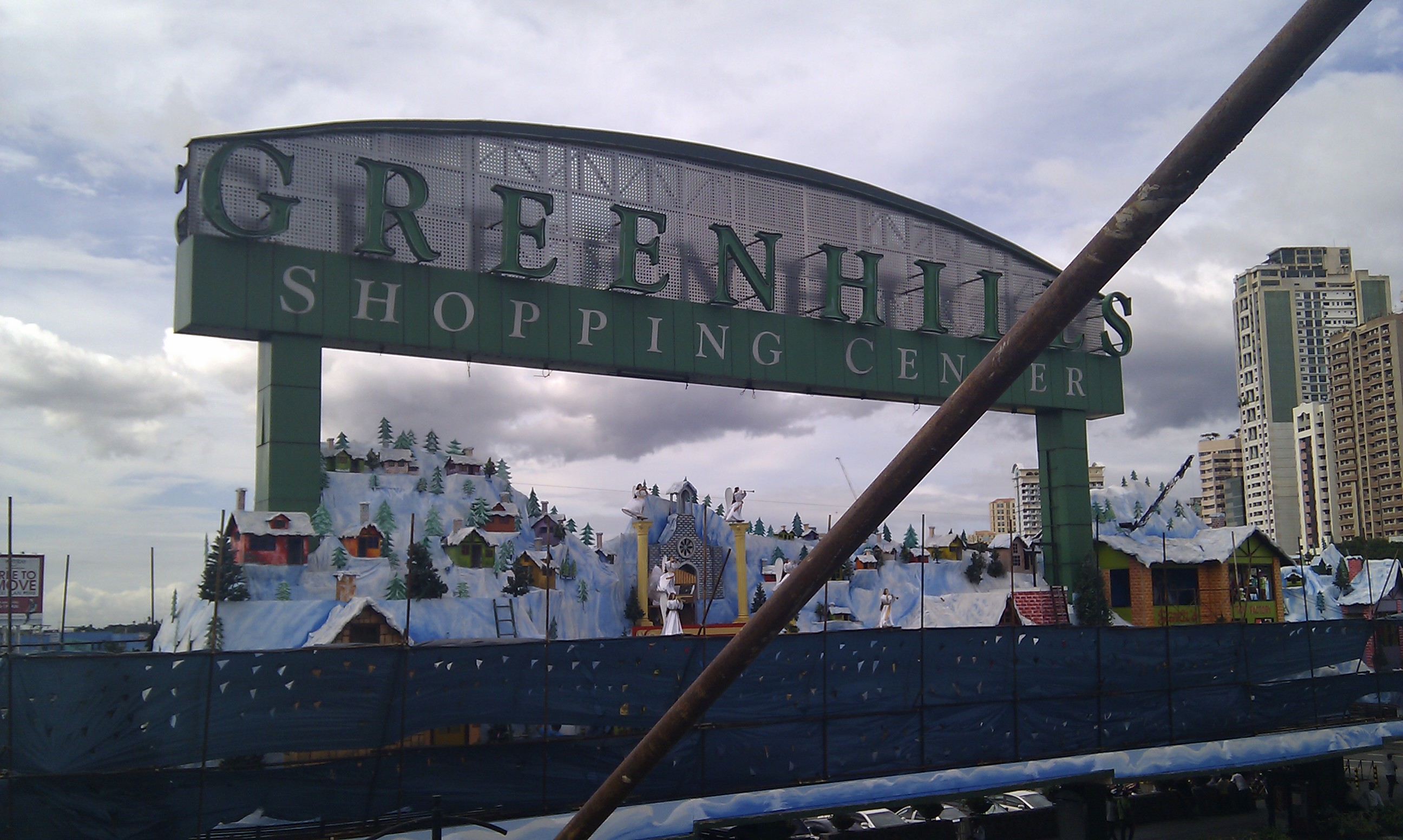
The Christmas On Display in 2010

From 2002 to 2016, Greenhills hosted the Manila Christmas On Display (COD), an animated Christmas display located beneath the complex's prominent sign with different themes every year. The tradition began in 1957 when it was designed by Alex Rosario, president of the Manila Cash On Delivery department store along Rizal Avenue in Manila as a display to attract customers to his family-owned department store. In 1966, the department store moved to Araneta Center in Quezon City, where the display was resumed on a grander scale. It remained there until the store closed in 2002. Afterwards, the display was transferred to Greenhills.

In 2017, the Manila COD in Greenhills was discontinued in 2017 to pave the way for renovations around the development. The prominent Greenhills sign was removed in 2018. That same year, the COD was revived with simultaneous displays and shows at both San Juan City Hall and the Times Square Food Park in Araneta Center, with the display being hosted at different locations since then.

== Religious facilities ==
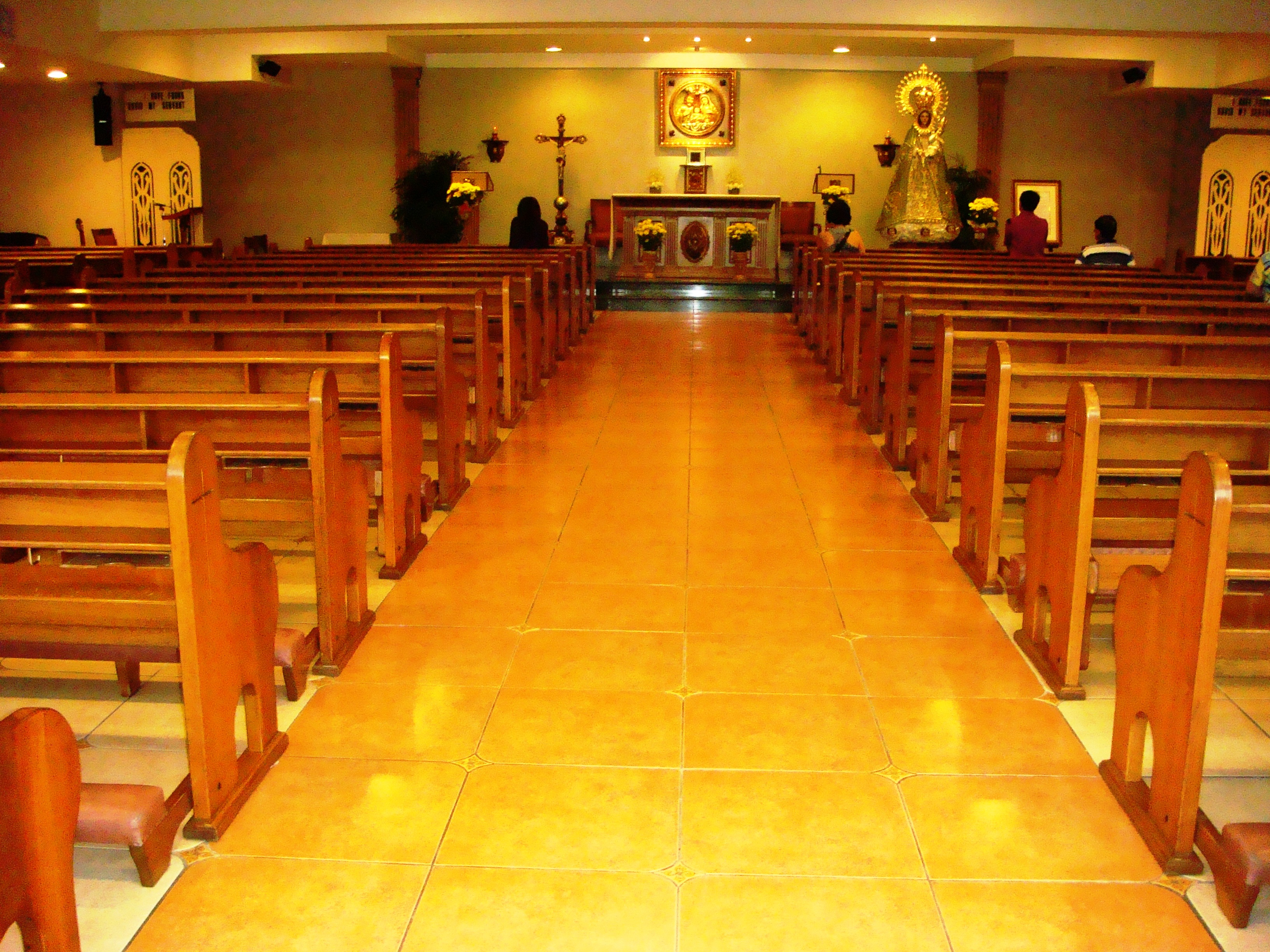
The Catholic Chapel of the Holy Family

The complex houses Chapel of the Holy Family, a Catholic chapel, and Masjid Greenhills, a Muslim musallah or prayer room. Victory also opened a branch at the fourth floor of Virra Mall. In addition, Jesus Is Lord Greenhills also holds its services at the Music Museum.

=== Greenhills Masjid ===
Originally, the lack of a dedicated musalla (prayer room) left Muslim tenants no choice but to pray their Salah within their stalls. This was until 1992, when Ortigas and Company granted the GMTA's request for a place of worship within the shopping center, as they were provided a prayer space in between Virra Mall, the Chapel of the Holy Family, and the Unimart supermarket. This space, however was criticized as a cramped, dimly lit service alley with an area not more than 100 m^{2} (1,100 sq ft).

In 2004, Ortigas and Company opened the Annapolis Carpark, a four-storey parking building along the west side of the shopping center. This was followed a year later by the opening of the Greenhills Masjid, a 400 to 500 m^{2} (4,300 to 5,400 sq ft) fully air-conditioned musalla on the ground floor of the building. The floor also included a washing area and a Halal-certified restaurant serving Maranao cuisine. The masjid is able to accommodate up to 2,000 worshippers at a time, while its prayer hall is able to accommodate 400 worshippers at a time. According to the GMTA, as of 2016, the Greenhills Masjid is the biggest and only air-conditioned Muslim prayer area enclosed in a shopping mall in the country.

At the year of opening, 500 out of the 2000 merchants of the shopping center were reportedly Filipino Muslims.

In 2018, following the demolition of the Annapolis Carpark and the opening of the seven-storey McKinley Building, the Greenhills Masjid moved to a new 1,000-square-meter (0.10 ha) center on the second floor of the McKinley Building.

== Incidents ==
- On February 5, 1995, a Honda Accord parked outside Unimart Supermarket exploded when its owner, Reynaldo Tan, opened the car door, triggering a grenade planted under the driver's seat. Tan was rushed to Cardinal Santos Medical Center but later died from his severe injuries. An investigation revealed that Tan's wife and her lover conspired to plant the grenade to facilitate their relationship. In 2003, the couple were both sentenced to death, but following the abolition of the death penalty under Republic Act No. 9346 in 2006, their sentence was commuted to reclusión perpetua in 2009.
- On October 5, 2008, an altercation occurred at the Krispy Kreme branch in Greenhills involving three members of the EB Babes, the resident dancers of the Eat Bulaga! variety show when the dancers accidentally cut in line, prompting a confrontation with a couple. The situation escalated when the wife pinched one dancer's shoulder, leading to a verbal argument. Although the dancers apologized and tried to leave, the husband threw coffee at one of the dancers and threatened to use violence, causing the dancer to be admitted to Cardinal Santos Medical Center for first-degree burns. Eat Bulaga! producer TAPE Inc. later issued a statement condemning the couple's actions and showed solidarity with the dancers. A separate statement was also made by the dancers reiterating their apology. The following day, the San Juan city prosecutor recommended filing criminal charges against the husband for less serious physical injuries.
- On August 15, 2014, a Mitsubishi Galant Super Saloon driven by 73-year-old Juanito Nocus fell off the Annapolis Carpark and onto Annapolis Street, landing on a Toyota Fortuner and another passenger car. The man was rushed to the hospital and was believed to have lost control of the vehicle due to heart problems.
- On November 18, 2018, a Toyota Innova driven by 83-year-old Dr. Teodoro Llamanzares, the father-in-law of then-Senator Grace Poe, accidentally accelerated the car off the third floor of a steel carpark in front of Promenade Mall and onto the driveway below. Poe stated that her father-in-law was responsive and sustained bone fractures and bruises but was in stable condition.
- On March 2, 2020, dozens of shoppers inside Virra Mall were held hostage by a 40-year-old man named Archie Paray, a security guard who was fired from work. One person was shot, but was reported to be in a stable condition in hospital.
- On March 6, 2020, a 62-year-old man who visited the Greenhills Masjid tested positive for COVID-19 and was confirmed to be the first local coronavirus case and fifth case in the country.

=== Greenhills Masjid controversy ===
In the early 2000s, plans to construct the Greenhills Masjid drew opposition from some residents and homeowner associations in Greenhills. The opposed residents expressed concerns that the mosque would affect property values or attract violent crime, and some groups threatened to boycott the shopping center if the project continued.

Ortigas Land denied these claims, stating that the Muslim traders were legitimate business owners and that the development would not negatively affect property values. Greenhills general manager Joey Santos also said that the project complied with existing laws and acknowledged the Muslim trading community as an important contributor to the commercial success of Greenhills.

While some local leaders and religious groups such as the Chapel of the Holy Family welcomed the mosque as a gesture of religious tolerance, other residents and organizations continued to lobby against it, with notable critics including The Philippine Star publisher Max Soliven and his wife Preciosa S. Soliven, who owned the O.B. Montessori Center across the proposed site. San Juan mayor JV Ejercito expressed support for the mosque, describing it as a "noble" initiative and criticized what he characterized as religious intolerance among the residents.

The Greenhills Masjid was completed and opened in 2005, despite the earlier opposition.
