= Cologne hostage crisis =

1995 hostage-taking in Cologne, Germany

- Location: 50°56′37.8″N 6°58′28.3″E; Rheinparkweg; Cologne, North Rhine-Westphalia, Germany
- Date: 28 July 1995; 10:40 – 17:44 (CEST)
- Attack type: Hijacking, shooting, bomb threat
- Weapons: Smith & Wesson 9mm handgun Explosive vest (unusable)
- Deaths: 3 (including the perpetrator)
- Injuries: 3 (1 by shattered glass)
- Perpetrator: Leon Bor

On 28 July 1995, a hostage-taking occurred during a sight-seeing tour in Cologne, North Rhine-Westphalia, Germany. A gunman held 22 passengers hostage on a parked tourist bus after killing the bus driver. The hostage situation lasted for seven hours. He injured a passenger as well as a police officer outside with gunshots, then fatally shot another hostage. The gunman was fatally shot when police stormed the bus.

== Hijacking ==
=== Immediate bus tour and murder of bus driver ===
The bus was scheduled to drive two hours through Cologne's Innenstadt, starting from the square of Cologne Cathedral. Besides the bus driver and the later hostage-taker, there were 25 passengers on board, the majority middle-aged or elderly, along with three children and a teenager. After 40 minutes, while in the district Deutz, the bus stopped to let passengers take pictures of the Tanzbrunnen on a parking lot outside the Koelnmesse.

During the stop, 31-year-old passenger Leon Bor stood up and walked to the driver's seat, where he pulled out a gun and shouted "Russian mafia" and ordered for everyone to stay still. Two minutes later, at 10:42, he shot the bus driver, 26-year-old Raimund Geuer, in the head. Bor ordered the tour guide in the frontmost seat, 33-year-old Lisa Klein, to close all the blinds, which she did while attempting to dissuade Bor from continuing the hijacking in English. Bor then tasked another passenger with going to the luggage compartment outside and getting his bag, but this woman fled. Klein was sent out afterwards, with Bor telling her in English "Come back or I kill the children." Klein complied and was sent to the back of the bus after bringing him the luggage. At around the same time, a construction worker noticed the bus and called police due to the blacked out windows.

=== Police arrival and first escapes ===
At around 11:00, a police car arrived at the scene to investigate the construction worker's call. As a policeman approached the back entrance of the bus, he was shot in the stomach, causing life-threatening injuries. The other officer fled, but returned to recover his colleague with backup several minutes later. While Bor was busy unloading his bag and changing his blood-soaked clothes, Lisa Klein noticed that Bor's gunfire on police had broken the glass of the rear window, roughly two meters off the ground, and after quietly extending the hole, she jumped out. She was pulled into cover by police, who provided first aid for cuts to her hand before transporting her to Eduardus Hospital. The remaining hostages consisted of ten Germans, four Americans, four Austrians, two Japanese, one Argentine, one Turk and one Israeli. Bor had redressed into a balaclava, black military fatigues and a green flak jacket, with silver cylinders attached around the waist, which he claimed were sticks of dynamite. To prevent more escapes, he gagged and tied up the other hostages with duct tape and cable ties, also blindfolding some, then ordered them to crouch in their seats. A 12-year-old boy attempted to flee through the front during this process, but he was caught and beaten by Bor.

A SEK unit of fifty officers arrived at the scene shortly after. The gunman opened communications with police via the built-in car phone of the bus. Bor, still claiming to be a member of the Russian mafia, made immediate requests for a Russian translator. Despite getting a clean view of the gunman during the phone talks, SEK decided against shooting the hostage taker from a distance. The officers had been informed that the gunman was wearing a checkered shirt and jeans, due to which believed the masked man in military gear was a second assailant. Team leader Volker Lange thus reasoned that they would need to kill both gunmen at the same time to ensure the safety of hostages. This meant that they would not make use of their firearms until they could either confirm only one gunman or if they saw both in the windshield, the only area that wasn't obscured, for a clear shot. Police marksmen remained in position on the roof of the Koelnmesse.

Inside the bus, Bor had hung loose wiring around the front of the vehicle and around his own neck. He put a wire through the bindings of the hostages in the front and attached the wire to a box with red-blinking lights, claiming it was a motion-detecting bomb. He made a similar threat to police, claiming her would blow up the bus if police attempted to come close, holding wires in his hands to mimic a detonator. He repeatedly threatened to shoot hostages, forced the passengers to take pictures of him with a polaroid camera he provided, as "souvenirs" he claimed, and talked incessantly about seemingly personal anecdotes, including about the prior year's Cave of the Patriarchs massacre and a trip to Paris. Hostages said that they had serious difficulty understanding Bor since he always yelled when speaking and constantly mixed basic German and English, evidently holding little fluency in either language, though he would sometimes talk to himself in Russian.

At around 15:15, a Russian language interpreter was brought to the scene, but no progress for release was made. Bor still insisted on speaking directly with police, demanding in English and German to talk "with government" and to "somebody big", later saying he wanted to contact with "the Russian leader" ("der russische Anführer").

=== Second escapes ===
At 15:20, while Bor was busy using the phone an 11-year-old boy managed to slip out of his bindings. Leaving his shoes, he attempted to sneak towards the broken window in the back, but was noticed by the gunman. As Bor took aim, 53-year-old Heinz Buchner, a tourist from Vienna, stood up and shouted "For God's sake, please not the child!" ("Um Gottes Willen, bitte nicht das Kind!"), distracting the gunman who instead shot Buchner in the right shoulder, critically injuring him in the lung. The boy managed to escape the bus unharmed.

By this point, the battery of the car phone ran out and due to the heat and poor ventilation, Bor then ordered Buchner to go outside to fetch water and a fully charged cell phone from police, threatening to kill Buchner's 55-year-old wife if he didn't return. Pushed by Bor, Buchner hoisted himself through the rear window and for four minutes, he crawled towards police, occasionally stopping to catch his breath behind cars for cover. Police secured Buchner and brought him to Eduardus Hospital to treat his gunshot wound. At 16:40, Bor fired several stray shots into the asphalt street outside.

=== Second murder and end of hostage crisis ===
At approximately 17:25, Bor began individually questioning the hostages about their countries of origin. When a 64-year-old woman, a tourist from Baden-Württemberg, responded "Germany", the first to name this nationality, Bor shot her in the chest. Bor then forced another passenger to take a picture of him posing with her corpse.

The killing spurred SEK into acting ("Notzugriff") and they verbally announced to Bor that they would bring him a cell phone to use at the front of the bus. Two officers approached and one broke the door open with his baton. At the same time, eight SEK officers entered through the rear window and opened fire on Bor, who had moved towards the exposed front of the bus. Bor was hit in the head by a rifle round from one of the snipers positioned on a nearby rooftop and in the torso by a sidearm from the SEK team leader. Over sixty gunshots were fired by police. Fatally wounded, Bor collapsed to the ground and shot himself in the head before he could bleed out. His death by suicide went unnoticed due to the immediate situation until a post-mortem medical examination, which showed the fatal gunshot was inflicted at close range. The supposed explosives on his vest turned out to be silver-painted wooden rods.

The incident had been filmed by several film crews since the shooting of the police officer. WDR cameras captured the escape of the 11-year-old boy and Heinz Buchner, as well as the SEK unit breaching the back of the bus. Bild photographer Marc Lucas captured the sequence of the boy jumping from the bus in several photographs.

== Perpetrator ==
Leon Bor (Hebrew: ליאון בּוֹר) was born on 10 July 1964 in Russia as Leonid Borschevsky (Russian: Леонид Борщевский; also Borichevski; Russian: Боричевский). He moved to Israel in 1989 and lived in Ramat Gan. Bor worked as a real estate agent in the Tel Aviv metro area and had defrauded several hundred thousands in Deutsche Mark through bounced checks. He served in the Israel Defense Forces for one month, but was discharged for mental problems, following an assault on a superior officer by spitting in his face. Although Bor was noted for his quick assimilation, learning fluent Hebrew within six months of his arrival, Bor's former bunkmate in the army told Tagesthemen that he was not surprised of Bor's involvement in the hijacking, stating that he was nervous, irritable, and prone to violence. He received an Israeli passport for the name Leon Bor in 1993 and moved to the United States the same year.

Bor had travelled to Germany via the Netherlands, having boarded a train in Amsterdam for Mainz. He had arrived in Cologne the morning of the hijacking. The central train station was two minutes on foot from the pick-up location of the sight seeing bus. He bought his ticket on site 23 DM.

Shortly after the hostage crisis, Avi Primor, at the time the Israeli ambassador to Germany, claimed that Bor had previously committed several acts of mass murder in Israel and similarly taken photos posing with the dead victims, asserting that Cologne police was withholding this information for the sake of the victims' families. German authorities denied having knowledge on any prior murders committed by Bor and after consulting with Mossad, they went on to state that they found no evidence for Primor's statements. The ambassador's office subsequently retracted the allegations.

== Aftermath ==
Heinz Buchner was lauded as a hero for his selfless actions on the bus, though tabloid newspapers incorrectly claimed that Buchner had physically jumped into the bullet's path to save the child. There were also initially inaccurate reports about the killing of the bus driver, variously claiming it was preceded by an argument or physical struggle, as well as the identities of those who had escaped the bus before the end of the hijacking, with reports during the incident mistakenly only describing three rather than four by excluding the 11-year-old.

Among Bor's possessions, a parachute, an altimeter, a sextant, and a portable navigation system were found. As witnesses also stated that Bor once talked used the word "airport" in his ramblings, leading investigators believed that Bor intended to hijack a plane, either before settling with the sight-seeing bus or for use in a later part of the hijacking.

North Rhine-Westphalia Police were unable to come up with a motive. The hijacking's two fatalities were killed after Bor was certain they were German, which led media to suggest that Bor had anti-German sentiments. All witnesses stated that Bor seemed unpredictable, angry, and never stated what he wanted to achieve. On 29 July, still in recovery, Heinz Buchner told reporters that Bor was completely unreasonable, saying, "In hindsight, I can tell you with certainty that I'm right to say that he [Bor] was a complete madman, a rebel, a completely sick human being, a psychopath, who was not with any group, who simply performed these actions because he felt like killing. [...] He did not want money, he demanded nothing, he just wanted to kill".

State prosecutor Karl Uckermann called Bor a "political murderer" and that he dressed "like a professional terrorist". Police press speaker Winrich Granitzka said given the "professional, determined execution" of the crime, he would speculate that Bor was "either mentally ill or setting a political beacon". Granitzka specified that there was no way to truly determine the motive, though he was in agreement with the assessment of Uckermann, who described Bor as "an absolute sadist who enjoyed killing". Criminal psychologist Frank Stein wrote in his 2003 book Grundlagen der Polizeipsychologie that Bor's background and behaviour pointed towards him being a "mentally ill, psychopathic offender" and that the hijacking was committed solely to fulfill a power fantasy to feel a sense of control for previous "conflicts and failures in his life". The motive remains officially unknown.

The Global Terrorism Database entered the hostage-taking and murders into their statistics. Jay Robert Nash included the hijacking in his 1998 book Terrorism in the 20th Century: A Narrative Encyclopedia From the Anarchists, through the Weathermen, to the Unabomber.

== See also ==
- Gladbeck hostage crisis
- Egged bus 300 hostage crisis
- 1988 Negev bus hijacking
- Bus 174 hijacking
- Manila hostage crisis
- Lutsk hostage crisis
