= 2007 Manila hostage crisis =

Incident in Manila City Hall, Philippines

- Date: March 28, 2007
- Time: 9:00 a.m. – 7:00 p.m. (PST)
- Location: Bonifacio Shrine, Manila, Philippines; 14°35′27″N 120°58′51″E
- Type: Hostage crisis
- Motive: Demand for free education and housing for underprivileged children; denunciation of government corruption.
- Deaths: 0
- Injuries: 0

The 2007 Manila hostage crisis occurred on March 28, 2007, when civil engineer Armando "Jun" Ducat Jr. and an accomplice held a busload of preschool children and teachers hostage in front of the Bonifacio Shrine in the Philippines. Ducat, the owner of the day-care center the children attended, initiated the 10-hour standoff to demand free college education and housing for his impoverished students, while also airing grievances against political corruption. The crisis, which was broadcast live nationally and globally, ended peacefully when Ducat surrendered to authorities and released all the hostages unharmed.

== Background ==
Armando "Jun" Ducat Jr., a 56-year-old civil engineer, grew up in one of Manila's poorest areas before achieving financial success. He became known in the shantytowns of the Tondo district for his philanthropic and socio-civic projects. Approximately four years prior to the incident, he founded the Musmos Day Care Center, a preschool catering to 145 underprivileged children in the Parola slum community.

Ducat had a history of staging extreme, attention-grabbing stunts to protest societal issues. In 1987, he held two Catholic priests hostage using fake grenades during a contract dispute. In 1998, he climbed a tower to protest a political candidate's citizenship, and he once pulled a heavy wagon of rice over 60 miles to protest high food prices.

== The standoff ==
On the morning of March 28, 2007, Ducat arranged a rented tourist bus to take his day-care students and their teachers on a promised field trip to Tagaytay to celebrate the end of the school year. At approximately 9:00 a.m., as the bus traveled through Manila, Ducat and an unidentified accomplice took control of the vehicle. Armed with an Uzi submachine gun, a .45-caliber pistol, and two live hand grenades, they directed the driver to park at the Bonifacio Shrine outside the Manila City Hall.

The hostage-takers taped a handwritten note to the bus windshield declaring they were holding the children and teachers hostage and listing their weapons. The bus driver was subsequently released to notify the authorities.

As police cordoned off the area and SWAT teams positioned themselves nearby, Ducat communicated with the media via mobile phone and a wireless public address system. Despite the heavy weaponry, Ducat repeatedly insisted that he loved the children and had no intention of harming them. He stated that his extreme actions were meant to secure a promise from the government to provide free college education and adequate housing for his 145 students, while also denouncing the pervasive corruption among politicians ahead of the May midterm elections.

Throughout the hot afternoon, the bus engine was kept running to provide air conditioning. One child suffering from a fever was released after four hours and taken away in a standby ambulance. The children were periodically seen waving to the cameras, occasionally appearing on live television broadcasts.

=== Negotiations and surrender ===
The administration of President Gloria Macapagal Arroyo monitored the situation closely, prioritizing a peaceful resolution. Several public figures and officials were involved in negotiations, including Social Welfare Secretary Esperanza Cabral, who assured Ducat that the children's educational needs would be addressed.

Senator Bong Revilla and political figure Chavit Singson were permitted to board the bus to negotiate directly with Ducat. Revilla later reported to the media that Ducat's hands were visibly shaking while holding a grenade with its pin pulled.

As evening approached, Ducat requested that the public light candles around the police perimeter. Shortly after 7:00 p.m., in accordance with an agreement reached with negotiators, Ducat delivered a final rambling speech over a loudspeaker apologizing for his "harsh step." He then handed the live grenades to Singson, who secured the pins, and surrendered his firearms. The children were allowed to safely disembark the bus, clutching their backpacks and dolls, to the cheers of an enormous crowd of onlookers.

=== Aftermath ===
Ducat and his accomplice were immediately taken into police custody and faced multiple criminal charges. Despite the danger he subjected the children to, Ducat retained substantial support among the impoverished families of Tondo, many of whom viewed him as a "hero" who gave voice to their marginalization. Several parents of the hostage victims stated they had no ill feelings toward him and refused to press charges, believing he genuinely cared for their children's futures.

== Media ethics controversy ==
The 10-hour standoff was covered live by local and international news networks, sparking intense debate regarding broadcasting ethics during crisis situations. The Center for Media Freedom and Responsibility (CMFR) heavily criticized the Philippine press for surrendering editorial control to the hostage-taker. By airing his seemingly well-rehearsed political speeches and demands in their entirety, news outlets were accused of becoming "hostaged" by Ducat, effectively rewarding his violent methods with unfiltered national airtime.

Specific breaches of journalistic standards were highlighted by media watchdogs. During the negotiations, radio anchor Ted Failon requested that Senator Bong Revilla keep his mobile phone active while speaking with Ducat, resulting in their sensitive negotiations being broadcast live over the ABS-CBN News Channel (ANC). Furthermore, anchors from competing networks, such as GMA-7, were criticized for delivering panicky and sensationalized commentary that risked escalating the tension on the ground. The extensive live coverage also raised concerns over the safety and privacy of the minor victims, as some broadcasts neglected basic rules for covering children in traumatic situations by inadvertently identifying them and their parents on air.

== See also ==
- Manila hostage crisis, another televised hostage taking incident in 2010.
