= Jorge Guillermo =

Former royal spouse

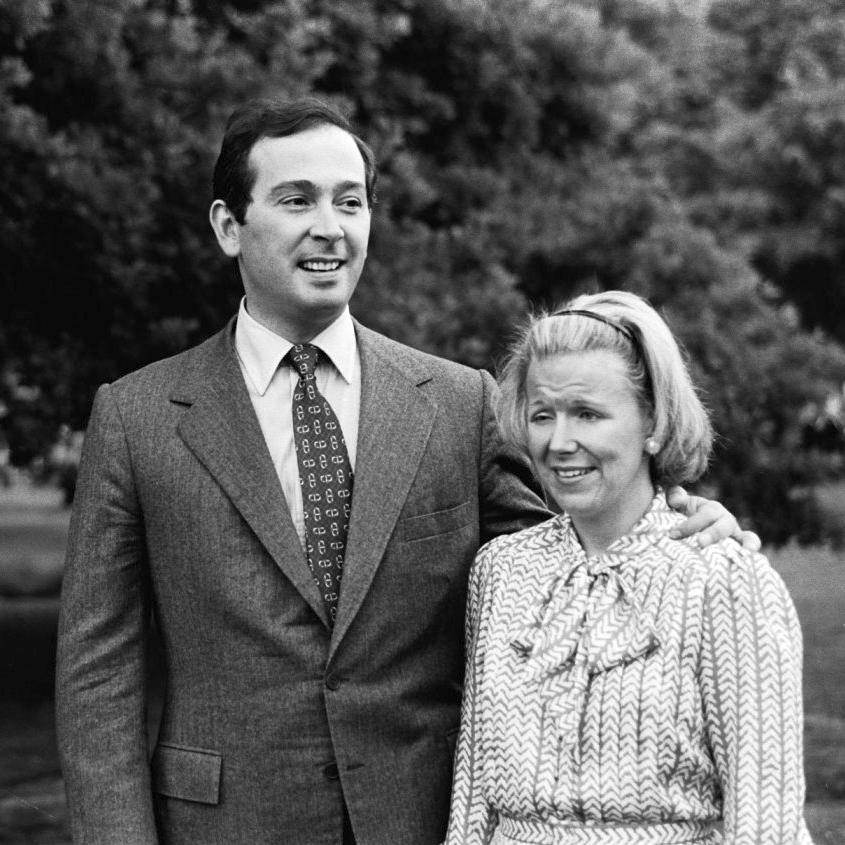
- Born: Jorge Pérez y Guillermo; August 1, 1946 (age 80); Havana, Cuba
- Education: Monmouth College (Illinois)
- Occupations: Welfare worker, teacher, royal spouse, author
- Spouse: Princess Christina of the Netherlands (m. 1975; div. 1996)
- Children: Bernardo Guillermo; Nicolás Guillermo; Juliana Guillermo
- Parent(s): Dr. Federico Pérez y Castillo; Prof. Edenia Guillermo y Marrero
- Relatives: Beatrix of the Netherlands (Sister-in-law); Gilberto Perez (Brother)

Jorge Pérez y Guillermo (born August 1, 1946) was the husband of Princess Christina of the Netherlands between 1975 and the couple's divorce in late 1996. He was accordingly brother-in-law to Queen Beatrix between 1980 and 1996. He is also a noted art collector. Since 1996, he has generally avoided gratuitous publicity.

== Life ==
=== Family provenance and early years ===
Jorge Guillermo was born in Havana, Cuba where he attended school until 1960. Dr. Federico Gilberto Pérez y Castillo (1911–1967), his father, was a physician with connections to the political establishment. Prof. Edenia Mercedes Guillermo y Marrero (1925–2002), his mother, held a series of senior positions in education administration by 1960, combining her duties as director of education of the province of Havana with a lectureship. Jorge Guillermo also had an older brother, named after their father, Gilberto Perez (1943–2015), who later became an American Professor of Film Studies. The decision that the family should leave the country was evidently taken, in the first instance, by Edenia Guillermo. (Note: In 1963 Jorge Guillermo explained his family's decision to leave Cuba in 1960 to an interviewer: "My parents did not want us to go to the Cuban schools because all the schools teach Communist indoctrination – even the private schools have been nationalized ... Castro took everything away from everyone and we were no exception to the rule. So my mother decided we should leave while we were permitted to because she knew that later on no one would be allowed to leave or enter Cuba.")

=== Political exile and further education ===
In 1960, following the Cuban Revolution, the Pérez y Guillermo family relocated from Cuba to the United States. Like thousands of other political refugees from Cuba, they settled in Miami, where Jorge Guillermo attended high school. Despite coming from a highly intellectualized family, there are indications that Jorge Guillermo did not share his elder brother's appetite for scholarship. He would nevertheless complete a course of university-level education. In 1963 he entered Cornell College in Iowa. His student visa expired after a year, but he and his brother were reclassified as refugees due to the political situation in Cuba. He then switched to Monmouth College in Illinois, graduating with an Art History degree in 1968. The transfer had been arranged by his mother, who worked at Monmouth College, between 1964 and 1975, as a professor of Spanish. Between 1965 and 1968, mother and son shared an apartment in the small town. Jorge Guillermo's father died in 1967.

=== New York ===
Circa 1973, Guillermo moved to New York City, where he became involved in the work of the charismatic poet-educator Frank "Ned" O'Gorman, a friend whom he had known since 1971. Since 1966, Gorman had been working to improve the "storefront school" a day-care and education center for the disadvantaged very young children of working mothers in the city's Harlem quarter. (Note: Many years later Ned O'Gorman would describe Guillermo, in an autobiographical work, as "one of the few, white or black, who seemed to understand exactly what I was doing in Harlem".) While O'Gorman ran the center, the focus of Guillermo's contribution was reported to be on fund raising. At one point, Guillermo and O'Gorman became surrogate parents for one of the children attending the center after his grandmother failed to retrieve the boy at the end of the day. It was not clear whether the two men were unable to trace the boy's parents, or the parents simply refused to take him back. Either way, young Ricky, two-and-a-half, moved in, becoming a member of the friends' bachelor household. There was no formal adoption, but Guillermo and O'Gorman shared parenting duties, which included toilet-training. Details of Ricky's condition never became clear: he was seriously ill. O'Gorman himself later recalled without elaboration that "it took him six years to die".

=== The New York music teacher ===
Jorge Guillermo and Ned O'Gorman were drawn together by the fact that both were opera lovers. O'Gorman, in particular, was also an incorrigible socialite and networker. In 1968, he traveled to the Netherlands to attend the wedding of his friend Frank Houben. A fellow guest was Princess Christina, the youngest and most rebellious of the queen's four daughters. Christina was, at the time, studying for a teaching diploma while also attending lectures and engaging as a semi-detached member of the student community at the University of Groningen. A couple of months later, the princess broke off her studies in Groningen and moved to Canada, which she had, she pointed out, already visited several times on vacation. She was accompanied, it was reported, by her two private secretaries, the Misses Vlieger and Berghout. Towards the end of 1968, Christina embarked on the study of voice teaching at the "École de musique Vincent-d'Indy in Montreal". Three years later, she moved on again to complete her time as a music student at the Music Conservatorium (as it was known at that time) of nearby McGill University. In 1973/74, she moved to New York, taking a post at a Montessori school as one of that city's most thoroughly educated teachers of music. She also gave private singing lessons and worked as a volunteer music teacher at Ned O'Gorman's "Storefront school" in Harlem. It is not clear if she had remained in touch with O'Gorman since their meeting at Frank Houben's wedding in 1968, or whether the two re-established contact only after she had become, like him, a New Yorker. Either way, O'Gorman was still, at this point, living with Jorge Guillermo, whom he later described as a "trusted colleague at the Storefront school for nearly three years".

=== Royal engagement ===
Sources differ over how Jorge Guillermo and Princess Christina first met. One states that their first encounter took place when they both attended the same performance at the Metropolitan Opera. Elsewhere, it is asserted that Guillermo was introduced to Christina van Oranje as early as 1972 at a dinner party arranged by a mutual friend, though at this stage he was unaware of her royal family connections. Given their close involvement in Ned O'Gorman's "Storefront school", and shared friendship with O'Gorman himself, it seems likely that directly or (less probably) indirectly, the couple met through Ned O'Gorman. They began dating, frequently going out together to the opera: Guillermo was reportedly writing a book on opera at the time. Romance developed. Their engagement was announced, formally, by the Dutch national press agency on 14 February 1975, (Note: "Hare majesteit de koningin en zijne koninklijke hoogheid de prins der Nederlanden kondigen met zeer veel genoegen de verloving aan van hun dochter Christina met de heer Jorge Guillermo. Prinses Christina en de heer Guillermo, die beiden in New Vork wonen, zijn gisteren met de prins naar Nederland gevlogen. Zij zullen daar tot 18 februari blijven") though among friends the princess continued to introduce Guillermo simply as her "boyfriend". Guillermo's mother had gained US citizenship in 1969, but Jorge Guillermo was still, when he and Christina teamed up, simply registered as a stateless refugee.

These were still Vietnam years: commentators at the time speculated that he had resisted citizenship to avoid conscription. However, conscription had ended in 1973 and in April 1975 Saigon would fall. During 1975, Jorge Guillermo gained US nationality. Following the engagement announcement, the couple found themselves at the center of much press attention. They were both fluent in English which was the language in which they communicated together; but they told reporters that the princess was now trying to master Spanish while Guillermo was struggling to master Dutch. During a press conference that the two of them held to face questions arising from their engagement, Guillermo demonstrated a relaxed approach more redolent of New York than of a royal court. After his fiancée had referred to him a number of times as "Mister Guillermo", he smiled across at her reassuringly: "you can also just call me Jorge". (Note: "Je mag me ook gewoon Jorge noemen.")

=== Royal wedding ===
Jorge Guillermo and Princess Christina married on 28 June 1975, in the townhall at Baarn, which is the administrative center for the district that includes the royal palace at Soestdijk. (Note: Marriages contracted under Dutch law have to be civil marriages solemnised in a townhall. It is naturally open to the parties to complement the civil ceremony with a church wedding if they wish to.) This was followed by a church celebration at the cathedral in Utrecht. The church ceremony was ecumenical since Jorge Guillermo came from a Catholic family while the Dutch royal family adhere to the Dutch Reformed Church. Having failed to obtain permission from the States General (Dutch parliament) ahead of her marriage to Guillermo, Princess Christina automatically lost her right to the throne. However, although the matter is reported in a number of sources, as the youngest of four royal siblings, with at least six of her nieces and nephews ranking ahead of her in order of precedence when it came to the succession, any sacrifice involved was largely a theoretical one. By not involving parliament in her decision to marry, the princess also avoided any discussions on the delicate and far from settled constitutional issues arising from her having chosen a Roman Catholic spouse.

In 1992, Princess Christina was herself received into the Roman Catholic Church, thereby joining the rest of the family in terms of Christian denomination, but forfeiting the British nationality to which she had hitherto been entitled under the terms of the Sophia Naturalization Act 1705.

=== Royal marriage ===
At the time of the marriage, the couple let it be known that they intended, once their honeymoon was completed, to return home and live once more as "ordinary New Yorkers". Jorge Guillermo did not, in fact, return to work at his former partner's "storefront school" in Harlem. Between 1975 and 1984 they lived in a large down-town apartment. Princess Christina had never shown any appetite for publicity. She had indeed voiced her wish to escape from her royal status as the reason for her relocation to North America. The wish was one that the media establishment and the wider public in the Netherlands could readily respect. Sources are in most respects silent about the couple's life together in New York.

Guillermo's new father-in-law was a non-executive director of the airline KLM: several sources indicate that it was through Prince Bernhard that directly after the marriage Jorge Guillermo obtained a position as a marketing executive with the Dutch national airline. A few years later he took a similar post with the Golden Tulip hotels group. There are reports that Jorge Guillermo turned out to be somewhat accident prone in his role as a business executive. Nevertheless, the KLM job, in particular, came with some excellent travel benefits, which extended to spouses, and of which Guillermo and his consort took frequent advantage.

While living in New York City between 1977 and 1981, the couple's three children were all born in Utrecht the Netherlands. All were baptised as Catholics.

The princess continued to shun the limelight: "I like to lead my life in anonymity, without the burden of being a princess. Where I can meet people who like me for myself...". (Note: "Ik beweeg me graag in de anonimiteit, waar die lading van prinses-zijn er niet is. Waar ik mensen kan ontmoeten en mensen mij aardig vinden om mijzelf ...") The couple could nevertheless sometimes be spotted in public at art auctions. Using the cut-price flight tickets provided to Jorge as part of his remuneration package from KLM, they acquired a reputation for being willing to fly "to anywhere they heard of art works of special interest for sale". They continued to collect obsessively even after Guillermo stopped working for the airline. Though they sometimes spent lavishly, Jorge's sound judgment of artworks was not infrequently vindicated by prices achieved in 1996 when much or all of the collection was sold.

In 1984, as the three children approached school age, the family returned to Baarn in the Netherlands where they settled. They initially lived in a section of the royal palace at Soestdijk. By this time Queen Juliana had retired and Christina's sister was on the throne, as Queen Beatrix. The Queen agreed to the construction of a family home for the Guillermos on the site of a former manor house at Eikenhorst in the royal park at De Horsten, on the edge of the prosperous commuter suburb of Wassenaar. A decade earlier, when the Guillermos were newly married, Princess Christina had spoken of her longing to live with her husband in a "simple family apartment". Evidently, as unsympathetic media commentators pointed out, their idea of a family home now involved something more substantial. One reason the move was controversial was that much of the royal park at De Horsten was (and is) open to the public. Indeed, the European trail E11 crosses it. According to one source, sections of the royal park had also been designated as a nature reserve, triggering protests from the country's powerful nature protection lobby. There were also reports that the royal couple did not pay much attention to obtaining necessary building permits from the town hall. An access road to the estate was closed in 1986, after which neighbors had to follow a diversion of several kilometers to reach their own small holdings. A swimming pool and a shed were built in the grounds for which official permission was sought (and received) only retrospectively. Guillermo's attempt to have a fence built round the family home triggered further difficulties with the municipal authorities.

During his years as a royal consort, Jorge also authored at least two books.

=== Royal divorce ===
In 1994 reports surfaced that the marriage was in trouble. An article appeared in De Telegraaf about a visit the couple made to an Amsterdam restaurant: it was alleged that Guillermo groped female serving personnel, apparently secure in the belief that his visually impaired wife was unable to know what was happening. Others were more circumspect, but rumors of Guillermo's marital misfeasances continued to circulate. In 1994, Juliana, their youngest child was 12. One of the first points of agreement in the divorce settlement was that Princess Christina should receive custody of their three children. Divorce proceedings lasted two years, possibly because of the accumulated legal complexities involved.

Towards the end of 1996, the matter was concluded and the divorce became officially public. On 19 and 20 November 1996, a major art auction was held at the Amsterdam premises of a multinational auction house. According to sources, the couple had been forced to sell some, most or all of their art collection due to the cost of the divorce. At least one newspaper asserted that "literally" everything capable of being removed from the home at Eikenhorst was to be included in the sale, which was expected to bring in at least two million Guilders (approximately one million Euros, without adjusting for subsequent inflation). The couple had lived in relative seclusion for some years: there was more than a hint of gleeful mock-surprise expressed in newspapers over the extent of the accumulated art collection that was auctioned.

=== Post-marriage ===
Directly after the divorce the children were removed from their respective schools and Princess Christina took them to live in New York City. Jorge had already relocated to Belgium in September 1994 and was studying Theology and Art History at the Flemish-language Catholic University in Leuven.

In 1999, Jorge relocated again, settling this time in London, England. His daughter moved from New York to live with him. Juliana Guillermo was now aged 18, the same age as that at which her mother had abandoned her education in her own mother's country to embark on a new life in Canada. In London, the young Juliana enrolled at the Central Saint Martins College of Arts and Design in preparation for a career as an artist. Both the sons remained in New York.

Jorge Guillermo's book, "Sibyls: Prophecy and Power in the Ancient World", was published in 2013.

At some stage early during the twenty-first century, Jorge Guillermo moved to the small town of Condom in the hill-country to the west of Toulouse in south-western France. It is not known whether or not he has visited the Netherlands after his divorce.

=== Legal matters ===
In 2005 Jorge Guillermo succeeded in a lawsuit against Privé, a Dutch gossip magazine. The magazine had reported that Guillermo was living in southern France with an American priest: it was stated or implied that the two men were in a gay relationship. The parties settled their dispute between themselves immediately before the hearing, so the matter never came before a judge. The Privé editor Evert Santegoeds explained to reporters that there was no dispute between the parties that Guillermo was living with an American priest. The point at issue concerned the journalist's allegation that Guillermo had been "involved with a man" while he was still married to Princess Christina. The magazine paid an amount in damages (albeit very much less than the amount originally claimed) and agreed to publish a correction. The agreement was endorsed by the court: Guillermo's requirement that Privé should produce no more stories about his private life was rejected by the magazine.

At around the same time, Guillermo also launched cases against the magazines Vrij Nederland and Weekend. This time the point at issue was a report by Emile Fallaux published in Vrij Nederland in April 2005 which had focused on Guillermo. It included detailed allegations that thirty years before Guillermo had been living in a gay relationship with Ned O'Gorman. Guillermo demanded financial compensation and a published retraction. The story was then taken on by Weekend which undertook detailed research that included interviews with O'Gorman, inspection of his personal diaries and of his published memoires. This time the publications being sued were content for the matter to come to trial. The court determined that the contentious stories were lawful and correct ("rechtmatig en juist"): Guillermo lost his case and received an order to pay the defendants' costs.
