= Gilberto Perez =

American film scholar

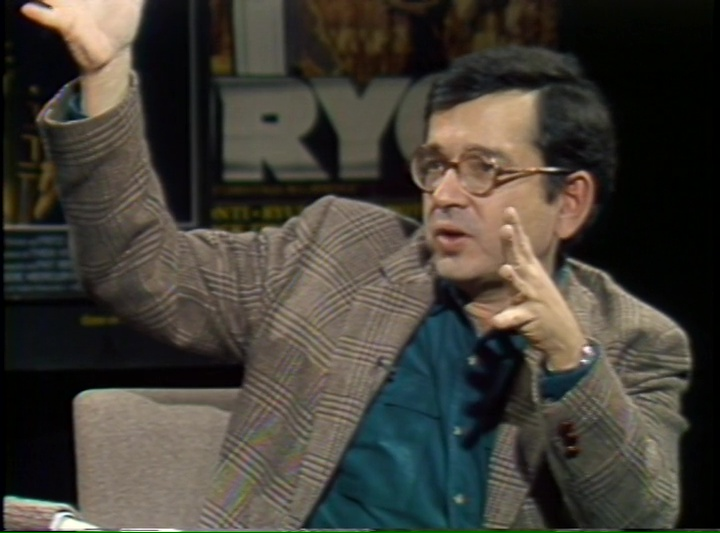
Perez discusses Steamboat Bill Jr. on CUNY TV's Cinema Then, Cinema Now (1989).

Gilberto Perez (1943 – January 6, 2015) was an American professor of film studies. Perez grew up in Havana, Cuba, where he was exposed to an eclectic international mix of films. He is the son of Federico Gilberto Pérez y Castillo (1911–1967) and Edenia Mercedes Guillermo y Marrero (1925–2002). He came to the United States in the early 1960s to study engineering. As an undergraduate at Massachusetts Institute of Technology, he became interested in theoretical physics. For Gil, theoretical physics was appealing because of its ability to explain the world around him: why a moving bicycle doesn't tip over. During the summer, he worked at American Science and Engineering in Cambridge, Massachusetts, analyzing rocket trajectories. At MIT, he became well known for his sometimes pretentious column of movie reviews in The Tech. After receiving his bachelor's degree, he enrolled in Princeton University as a Ph.D. candidate in theoretical physics, but his interest in film began to overtake his interest in physics. As with his work in physics, he always had his own sensibility as to the importance of film criticism. As a film critic, he wanted to understand how and why the film functioned - why the bicycle/film didn't tip over.

He was the head of the film history department at Sarah Lawrence College from 1983 to 2015. He died January 6, 2015, at the age of 71. Perez is survived by his wife, Diane Stevenson and a younger brother, Jorge Pérez y Guillermo and former sister-in-law, Princess Christina of the Netherlands and their offspring, his two nephews Bernardo Guillermo and Nicolás Guillermo, and niece Juliana Guillermo.

== Awards ==
- Noble fellowship for Advanced Studies in the Visual Arts at the Museum of Modern Art.
- Mellon Faculty fellowship at Harvard University.
- Weiner Distinguished Professorship in the Humanities at the University of Missouri.

== Books ==
- The Material Ghost: Films and Their Medium, The Johns Hopkins University Press (November 29, 2000) ISBN 0-8018-6523-9
- The Eloquent Screen: A Rhetoric of Film, University of Minnesota Press (2019) ISBN 978-0816641338

== Articles and film reviews ==
- 1967: "Shadow and Substance: Murnau's Nosferatu", Sight & Sound 36:3 (Summer). Reprinted, in Spanish translation, in the Madrid journal Revista de Occidente 61, April 1968.
- 1969: "Jacques Becker: Two Films", Sight & Sound 38:3 (Summer).
- 1971: "F.W. Murnau: An Introduction", Film Comment 7:2 (Summer). Reprinted in the anthology Passport to Hollywood (McGraw-Hill, 1976).
- "Twenty-four Times a Second", Sight and Sound 40:4 (Autumn).
- 1972: "The Chaplin Revue", Film Comment 8:3 (Sept/Oct)
- 1975: "All in the Foreground: A Study of Dovzhenko's Earth", The Hudson Review 28:1 (Spring).
- 1977: "The Narrative Sequence", The Hudson Review, 30:1 (Spring), 80–92. Reprinted in New Observations, No. 36, Winter 1985–86.
- 1977-78: "Narrative Voices" [on Arreola, Coover, Donoso, Peter Taylor, Anne Tyler, and others], The Hudson Review 30:4 (Winter 1977–78); a section reprinted in a volume of the anthology Contemporary Literary Criticism.
- 1978: "The Interior of the Decorator" [On Woody Allen's Interiors], New York Arts Journal 11 (Sept/Oct).
- "Modernist Cinema: The History Lessons of Straub and Huillet", Artforum 17:2 (October). Reprinted, at Jean-Marie Straub's own request, in the accompanying booklet (ed. Jonathan Rosenbaum) to the retrospective of the films of Straub and Huillet at the Public Theater, New York City, November 1982.
- "Something to Look up to" [On Spielberg's Close Encounters of the Third Kind] 8 (Feb/Mar).
- 1979: "Fiction Chronicle" [on Bataille, Günter Grass, Pinget, Stegner, and others], The Hudson Review 32:3 (Autumn).
- "Film Chronicle: Days of Heaven", The Hudson Review 32:1 (Spring).
- "Herzog's Nosferatu", New York Arts Journal 16 (Nov/Dec). Reprinted in a volume of the anthology Contemporary Literary Criticism.
- "Up Close" [On Bergman's Autumn Sonata (Höstsonaten)], New York Arts Journal 13 (Feb/Mar).
- 1980: "Kubrick's Fearful Geometry" [On The Shining], New York Arts Journal 19 (Sept/Oct)
- "These Days in the Holocene" [on Max Frisch, Nadine Gordimer, Paul Theroux, and others] The Hudson Review 33:4 (Winter 1980–81); a section reprinted in a volume of the anthology Contemporary Literary Criticism.
- 1981: "The Bewildered Equilibrist: An Essay on Buster Keaton's Comedy", The Hudson Review 34:3 (Autumn).
- "The First and Other Persons" [on Calvino, Milosz, Philip Roth, and others], The Hudson Review 34:4 (Winter 1981–82).
- "A Note on Buñuel's Narrative", Artery 5:1 (October).
- 1982: "Between Life and Art" [on photography and painting], The Hudson Review 35:2 (Summer).
- "The Thread of the Disconcerting" [Considering Luis Buñuel], Sight and Sound 52:1 (Winter 82–83), 58–61.
- 1983: "Atget's Stillness", The Hudson Review 36:2 (Summer).
- 1984: "The Camera and the Subject", New Observations 27 (Winter 1984–85).
- 1985: "A Question of Point of View", Sight and Sound 54:2 (Spring), 133–4.
- 1986: "Godard's Tenderness", Raritan, 6:1 (Summer), 63–83.
- 1988: "The Madwoman in the Loft: Fatal Attraction" (with William Park), The Hudson Review, 41:1 (Spring), 197–202.
- 1989: "Landscape and Fiction: Jean Renoir's Country Excursion", The Hudson Review, 42:2 (Summer), 237–60.
- 1991: "Bell-Bottom Blues" [on Godard and his film Nouvelle Vague], The Nation Feb. 18.
- "In the Beginning" [on early cinema and theories of the spectator], The Nation November 4.
- "The Point of View of a Stranger, an essay on Antonioni's Eclipse", The Hudson Review, 44:2 (Summer), 234–62.
- 1992: "The Cult of the Colt" [on the Western and its politics], The Nation, September 14.
- 1993: "The Frontier Dialectic", The Nation, October 25.
- "It's a Wonderful Life" [on formative moviegoing, movie critics, and movie directors], The Nation, January 4/11.
- "Nosferatu", Raritan, 13:1 (Summer), 1-29.
- 1994: "The Centenary of Jean Renoir", The Yale Review 83:4 (October).
- "A Man Pointing: Antonioni and the Film Image", The Yale Review, 82:3 (July), 38–65.
- 1996: "Film in Review: The Gangster's Enterprise", The Yale Review, 84:3 (July), 186–95.
- 1997: "Film in Review: The Edges of Realism" [Considering the films of Abbas Kiarostami], The Yale Review, 85:1 (January), 171–84.
- "Film in Review: The Liberal Imagination" [Considering The People versus Larry Flynt], The Yale Review, 85:3 (July), 175–87.
- "Films, The Material Ghost", Raritan, 16:4 (Spring), 106–26.
- 1998: "Cinema in Review: Victor Nunez and Ulee's Gold", The Yale Review, 86:2 (April), 174–85.
- "L'or et le miel", Trafic 28 (Hiver).
- "La sequenza narrativa", Quaderni 2.
- "Theory and Aesthetics in Film Scholarship" - 'In the Study of Film, Theory Must Work Hand in Hand With Criticism', Chronicle of Higher Education 45:11 (November 6), 6–7.
- 1999: "An Actor and a Director Whose Bond Was, Well, Mad" [on Klaus Kinski and Werner Herzog], The New York Times, Sunday, November 7.
- "Cinema in Review: Spectacle and Surveillance", The Yale Review 87:1 (January), 182–92.
- "Film in Review: Ghosts of the City: Films of Ernie Gehr", The Yale Review 87:4 (October), 173–88.
- "Obsessed by Place, and Finding One on a Frontier" [on Ernie Gehr], The New York Times, Sunday, March 21.
- "Slices of Cake" [on Alfred Hitchcock], London Review of Books, 21:16, 19 August.
- 2000: "Toward a Rhetoric of Film: Identification and the Spectator", Senses of Cinema - on-line journal 5 (April).
- Forthcoming: "Film in Review: Bad Boys", The Yale Review 88:2 (April).

=== Articles from the London Review of Books ===
- How We Remember Terrence Malick, 12 September 2013
- Bourgeois Nightmares: Michael Haneke, 6 December 2012
- House of Miscegenation: Westerns, 18 November 2010
- Building with Wood: Time and Tarkovsky, 26 February 2009
- Self-Illuminated: Godard's Method, 1 April 2004
- It's a playground: Kiarostami et Compagnie, 27 June 2002
- Looking for Imperfection: John Cassavetes, 23 August 2001
- "Who is this Ingrid Bergman?": Stroheim and Rossellini, 14 December 2000
- So Close to the Monster: The Trouble with Being Cuban, 22 June 2000
- Slices of Cake: Alfred Hitchcock, 19 August 1999

=== The Criterion Collection: DVD Notes ===
- L'eclisse: Antonioni and Vitti
- A Day in the Country: Jean Renoir's Sunday Outing
- The Life of Oharu: Not Reconciled
