= Baarnse Bos =

Forest in the Netherlands

Coordinates: 52.2101°N 5.2825°E

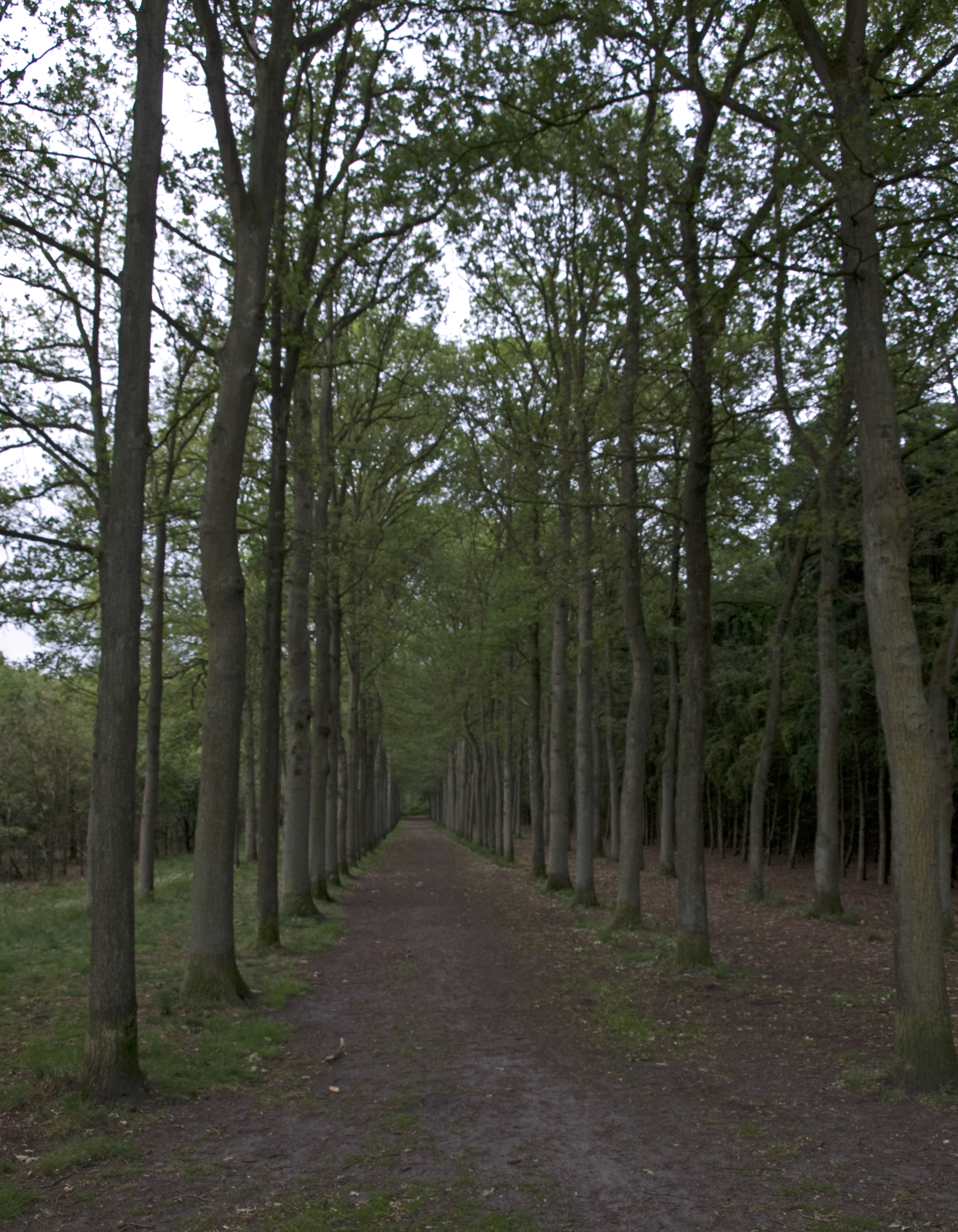
An avenue with beach trees in the Baarnsche Bos

The Baarnse Bos is a park/forest in the southern part of the municipality of Baarn, the province of Utrecht (province), the Netherlands. The area of the forest if approximately 80 hectares (200 acres) and is adjacent to the Soestdijk Palace.

The forest is limited by Amsterdamse Straatweg (N221) in the west, Lt. Generaal van Heutszlaan in the north, the railway connecting Amsterdam and Amersfoot, as well as Torenlaan in the east, and Praamgracht in the south. The Soestdijk Palace is across Amsterdamse Straatweg, and the Baarnse Bos continues across this road as a large forest reaching Hilversum in the west.

The Baarnse Bos was designed as a French landscape garden between 1733 and 1758. At the time, it was built around the land estate De Eult. In 1758, the estate, together with the forest, was transferred to the Dutch royal family. Since the end of the 19th century, it has been accessible for general public.
