= Conimex =

Brand of Asian food

Conimex is a brand of Asian food, which offers products to prepare Indonesian dishes packed in yellow labeled packages. The brand name originally stands for CONserven IMport EXport maatschappij (Canned foods import export company) but it now is used as generic brand name.

The brand is owned by Finnish food group Paulig. It is the leading Asian food brand in the Netherlands. Conimex products are exported to more than 20 countries.

The brand was formerly owned by Reckitt & Colman until 1990, and then CPC International/Bestfoods until Unilever acquired Bestfoods in 2000.. Paulig acquired Conimex from Unilever in April 2025.

== See also ==
- Baarn
