= Albert Muis =

Dutch painter

Abert Muis
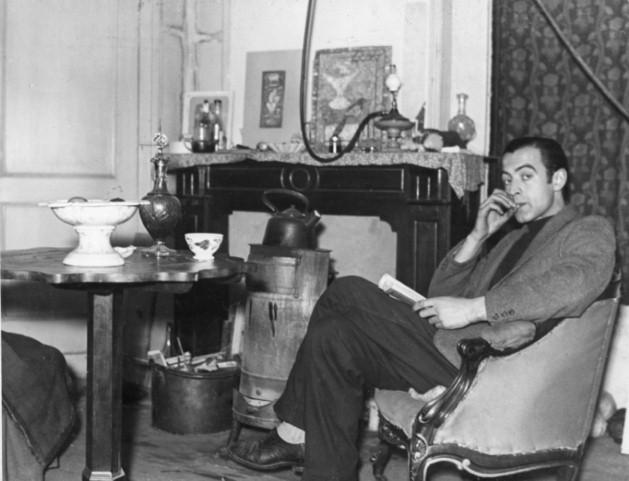
- Albert Muis in his studio at Amsterdam (c. 1944)
- Born: 22 October 1914; Baarn, Netherlands
- Died: 24 September 1988 (aged 73); Perpignan, France
- Education: The Academy of Fine Arts, Amsterdam
- Known for: Drawing and painting Frescos
- Notable work: Frescos; Acardia (1952); Waterflow (1955); Theseus and Ariadne's thread (1958); Narcissus (1958)
- Movement: Avantgarde painting

Albert Muis (22 October 1914 – 24 September 1988) is a Dutch artist, wall painter, watercolourist, manufacturer of gouaches, painter, and draftsman from the Netherlands known for his contributions to drawing and painting in the 20th century. His works includes Frescos Acardia (1952), Waterflow (1955), Theseus and Ariadne's thread (1958), and Narcissus (1958). His art works are known to be Avant-garde.

Born in Baarn, Netherlands, to a Christian family, Muis childhood was influenced by his father's encouragements as well as travels to different lands especially Italy and France. He was influenced by the paintings of Jules Breton and Giotto.

== Life ==
=== Background and early artistry ===
Muis was born on 22 October 1914 to a Protestant christian family in Baarn, in the central Netherlands, as the youngest and only boy out of three children. He became interested in painting and music around the age of seven and encouraged by his father, a Chief Accountant of a gas factory, he took lessons in both drawing and music. After leaving secondary school in Hilversum, Muis faced painting while abandoning music.

In 1931, he joined an art school in Amsterdam, and subsequently an Academy of Fine Arts in Amsterdam, Netherlands, in July 1934. He studied drawing and painting until 1935, when he left for France and was influenced by the paintings of Jules Breton as well as Giotto in 1937, when he visited Italy's Florence, Venice, and Pompei. He also took Monumental Art tutorials and thus, became specialized in wall painting from that year until 1938.

=== Exhibition and breakthrough ===
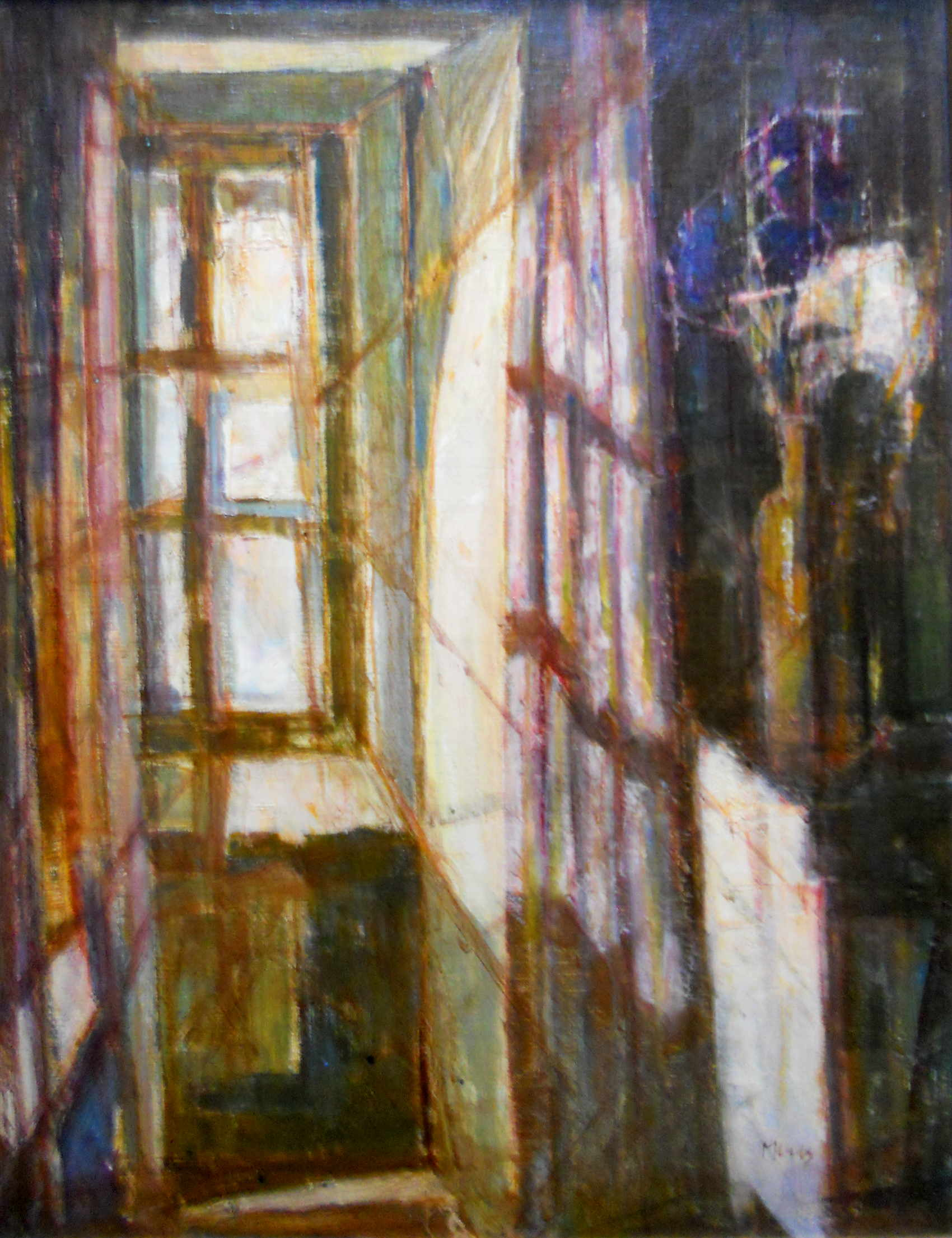
Fenêtre, Atelier Mas Rossignol, Argelès

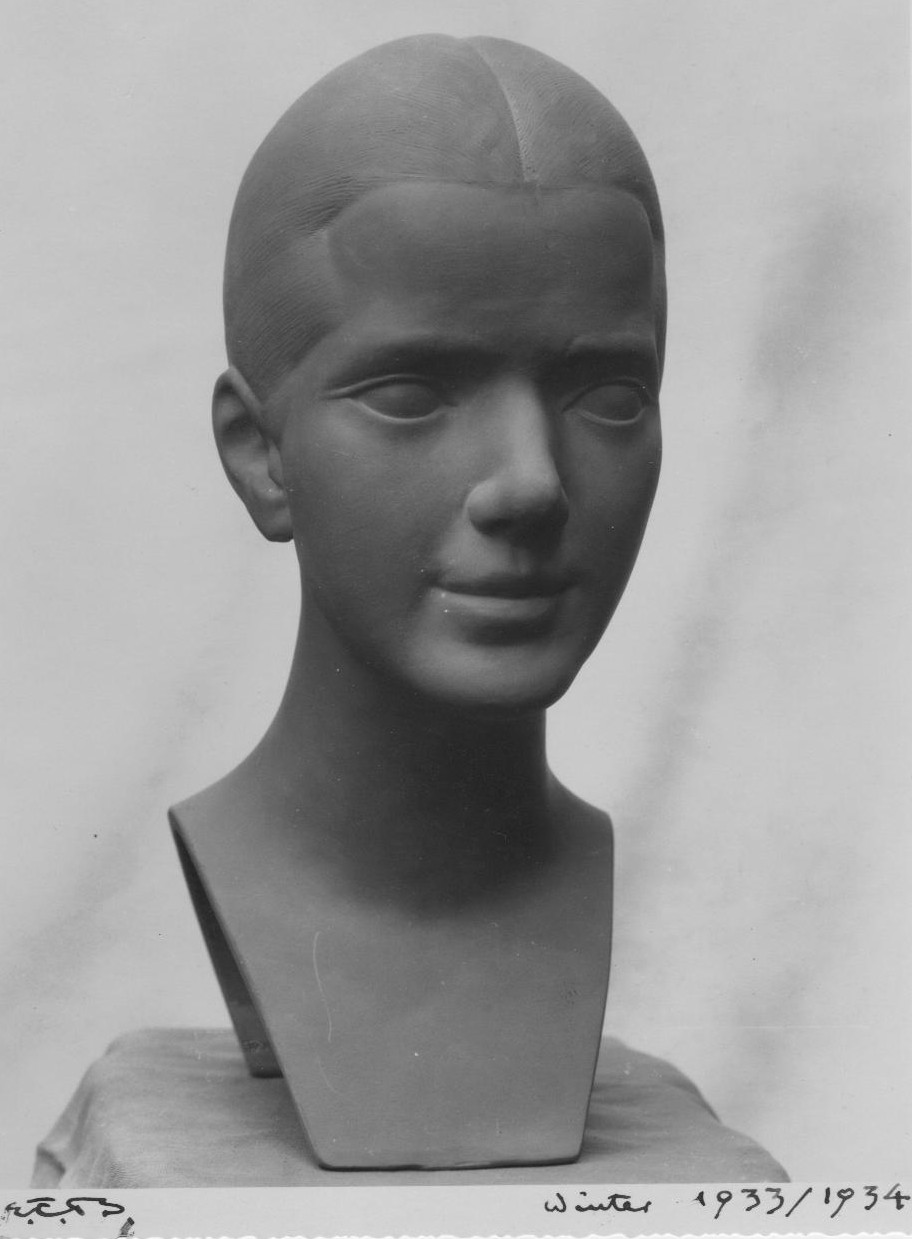
Buste de Hanna Deppe 1933 de Erwin Friedrich Baumann

Muis completed his first mural painting, a state commission for the Dutch Pavilion at the World Exhibition in Paris. In 1939, he worked with architects for the Tuyen Luchtvaart Laboratorium in Amsterdam and focused on easel painting in his studio in Amstel, Amsterdam. He made his first exhibition in Amsterdam (gouache, oil on wood) at Galerie Robert, Amsterdam in May 1940. After two years, he participated in an exhibition of young avant-garde painters in Amsterdam, a demonstration which was forcibly condemned by the Nazis.

He exhibited in Groningen, Netherlands, in 1946 and 1947 at Galerie De Boer. He participated in the 1948 group exhibition in Rotterdam and in the same year, painted three frescoes entitled "The Mourners". The painting was in the entrance hall of the Oosterbegraafplaats, a cemetery in Amsterdam which was commissioned by the municipality of Amsterdam. He has also participated in the Venice Biennale and exhibited in Amsterdam, Groningen and Rotterdam in 1949. Muis settled with his family in Port-Vendres, France. In 1952, he made a wall painting for the Auditorium Oosterbegraafplaats in Amsterdam: "Arcadia" of Mediterranean-inspiration (from sketches done in Park Vilmarest in Argelès-sur-Mer). In 1955 he exhibited in Utrecht and produced a mural painting at the University of Groningen entitled "Waterfowl".

The Stedelijk Museum in Amsterdam acquired some of his works, including his "Palm Tree" drawing for the Rijksmuseum Prenten Cabinet and also his gouache, "Still Life with Fish", and oils on canvas. In 1956, he received a prize in painting completion by K.N.S.M., a Dutch shipping company. In 1957, he also exhibited in Gallery Bassano, France and also travelled to the Netherlands to achieve the "Four Elements", a mural painting for The Atom exhibition in Schiphol. He completed his two murals "Narcissus" in Spinoza Lyceum, Amsterdam and "Theseus and Ariadne's thread", also in Amsterdam. The two wall paintings were created from the numerous sketches he made in the Roussillon countryside, on the banks of Tech, near Arles sur Tech. Since then, Muis has exhibited his artworks in Galerie Barbizon, Paris (1960), Grand Café de Ceret (1962) and Perpignan (Salle Arago) (1961 and 1966).

From 1970 to 1971, his works were also displayed in Florence, Italy, Gallery Paolo Vaccerino. The Cultural Center in Bellefontaine Mirail, Toulouse, presented his works in 1972 and at the 'Salon des Indépendants' in Paris in 1973 and 1974. It was followed by "Club of Law and Economics", an artwork exhibited in 'Place des Invalides', Paris. In 1978, he had an exhibition of his works in Singer Museum, Laren.

== Later life and death ==
After the war in 1946, Muis married Hanna Deppe, a swiss woman from Switzerland. They had a daughter in 1947 and a son in 1951 at Perpignan, after settling in France. Muis' wife Deppe died at sixty-nine in September 1982, after a long illness. Muis did not exhibit in public places any more, except in his studio. Reportedly affected by the death of his wife, his health became precarious until September 24, 1988, when he died at seventy-four in his house.

== Works ==
Frescos

- Les Pleureuses (1948)
- Acardia (1952)
- Waterflow (1955), University of Groningen
- Theseus and Ariadne's thread (1958)
- Narcissus (1958)
