= Princess Christina of the Netherlands =

Dutch princess (1947–2019)

Princess Christina
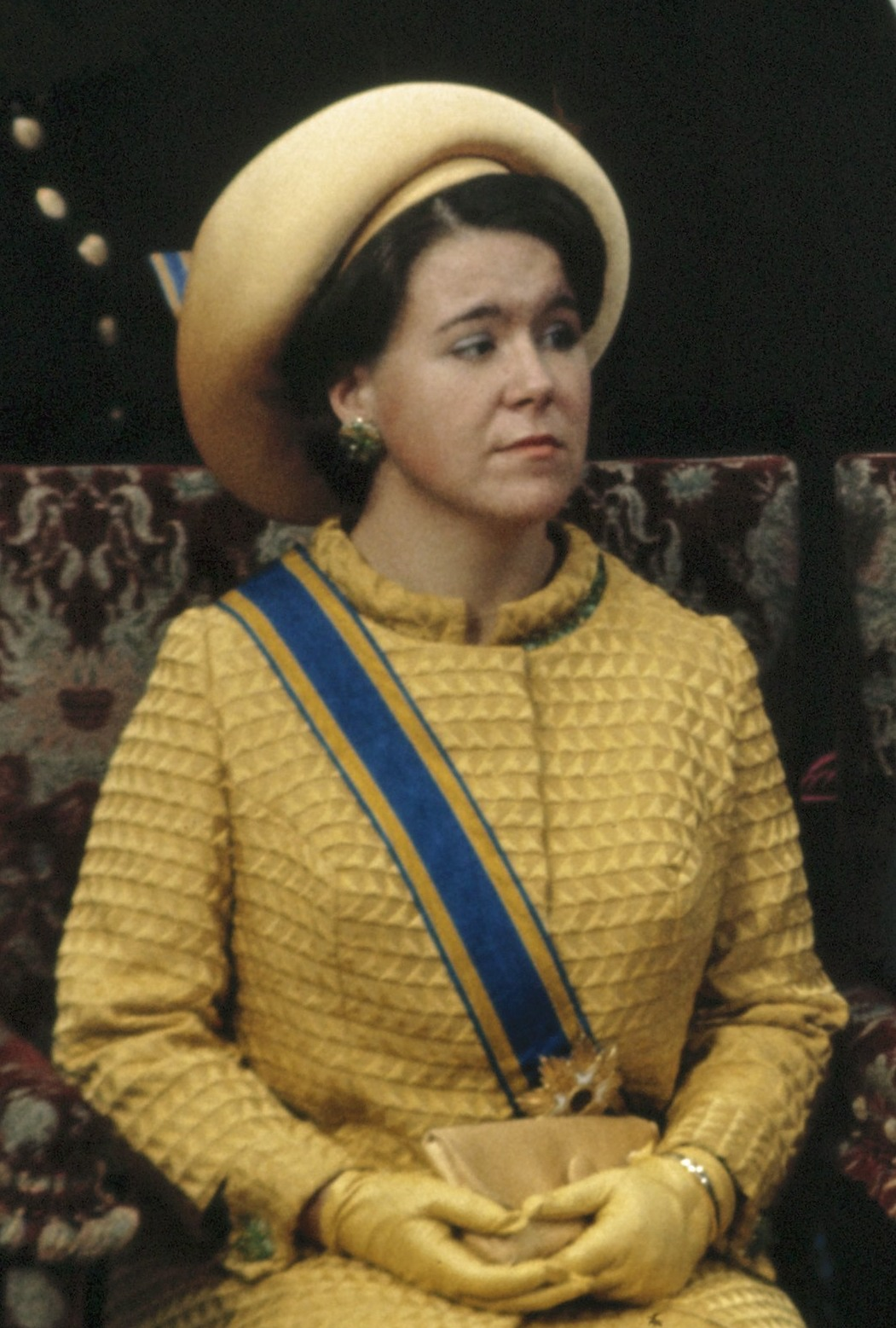
- Christina in 1968
- Born: Princess Maria Christina of the Netherlands; 18 February 1947; Soestdijk Palace, Baarn, Netherlands
- Died: 16 August 2019 (aged 72); Noordeinde Palace, The Hague, Netherlands
- Spouse: Jorge Pérez y Guillermo (m. 1975; div. 1996)
- Issue: Bernardo Guillermo; Nicolás Guillermo; Juliana Guillermo
Names
- Maria Christina van Oranje-Nassau
- House: Orange-Nassau (official); Lippe (agnatic)
- Father: Prince Bernhard of Lippe-Biesterfeld
- Mother: Juliana of the Netherlands

Princess Christina of the Netherlands (Maria Christina; 18 February 1947 – 16 August 2019) was the youngest of four daughters of Queen Juliana of the Netherlands and Prince Bernhard of Lippe-Biesterfeld. She taught singing in New York and was a long-term supporter of the Youth Music Foundation in the Netherlands. Born visually impaired, she worked to share her knowledge of dance and sound therapy with the blind.

She renounced her and her descendants' rights to the throne before marrying Cuban exile Jorge Guillermo in 1975, and converted to Catholicism in 1992. The couple had three children and built up an extensive art collection, before they divorced in 1996. Christina died of bone cancer in 2019.

== Early life ==
Princess Christina, who was known as Princess Marijke in her youth, was born on 18 February 1947, at Soestdijk Palace, Baarn, the Netherlands. Her parents were Crown Princess Juliana, the only child of Queen Wilhelmina of the Netherlands, and Prince Bernhard of Lippe-Biesterfeld. At the time of her birth, she was fifth in the line to the throne after her mother and three older sisters: Princess Beatrix, Princess Irene and Princess Margriet.

She was baptised on 9 October 1947 and her godparents included Queen Wilhelmina (her maternal grandmother), her eldest sister Princess Beatrix, Sir Winston Churchill (for whom her father stood proxy), her paternal grandmother Princess Armgard of Lippe-Biesterfeld, Prince Felix of Luxembourg, and his niece Princess Anne of Bourbon-Parma.

On 4 September 1948, after a reign of nearly 58 years, Christina's grandmother Queen Wilhelmina (68) abdicated the throne and her mother was inaugurated as Queen of the Kingdom of the Netherlands on 6 September 1948.

== Childhood and education ==
While her mother was pregnant with Christina, she contracted either measles or rubella and as a result, Christina was born nearly blind. With medical treatment and custom eyeglasses, her vision improved to a point that she could attend school and live a relatively normal life.

In 1963, she stopped using her first name Maria, from then on referring to herself merely as Christina. She graduated from secondary school (Amersfoort Lyceum) in 1965 and went on to attend the University of Groningen, where she studied teaching theory. At age 21 she moved to Canada to study classical music at the École de musique Vincent-d'Indy in Montreal, where she studied vocal teaching.

== Marriage ==
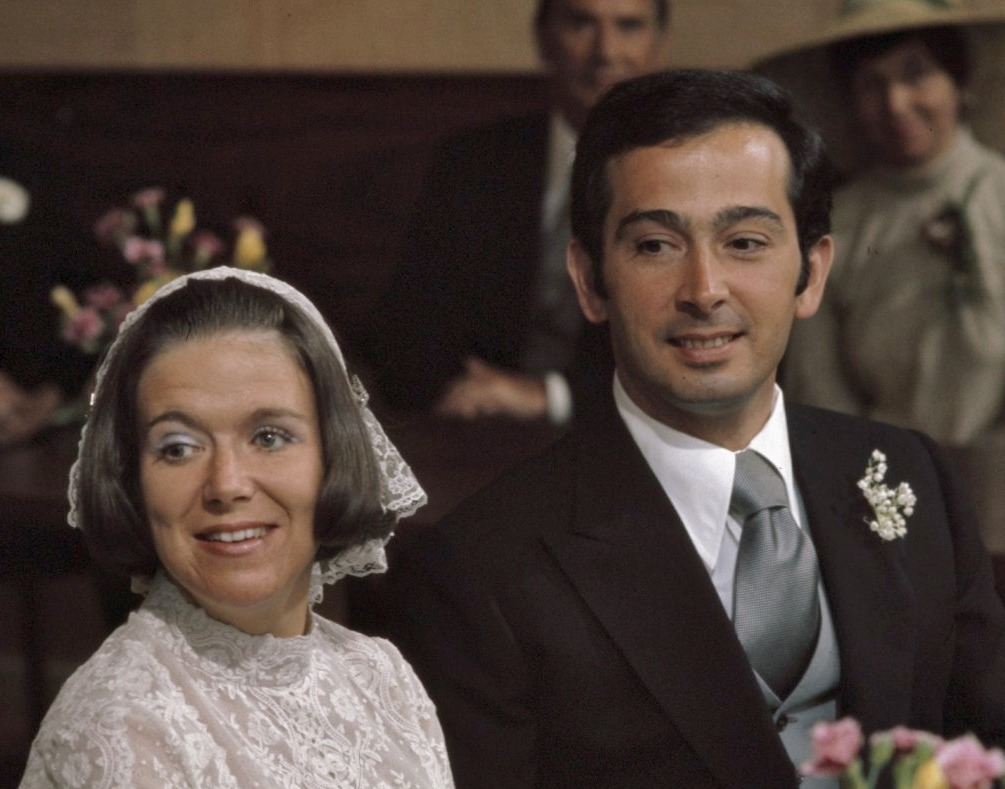
Princess Christina & Jorge Pérez y Guillermo in 1975

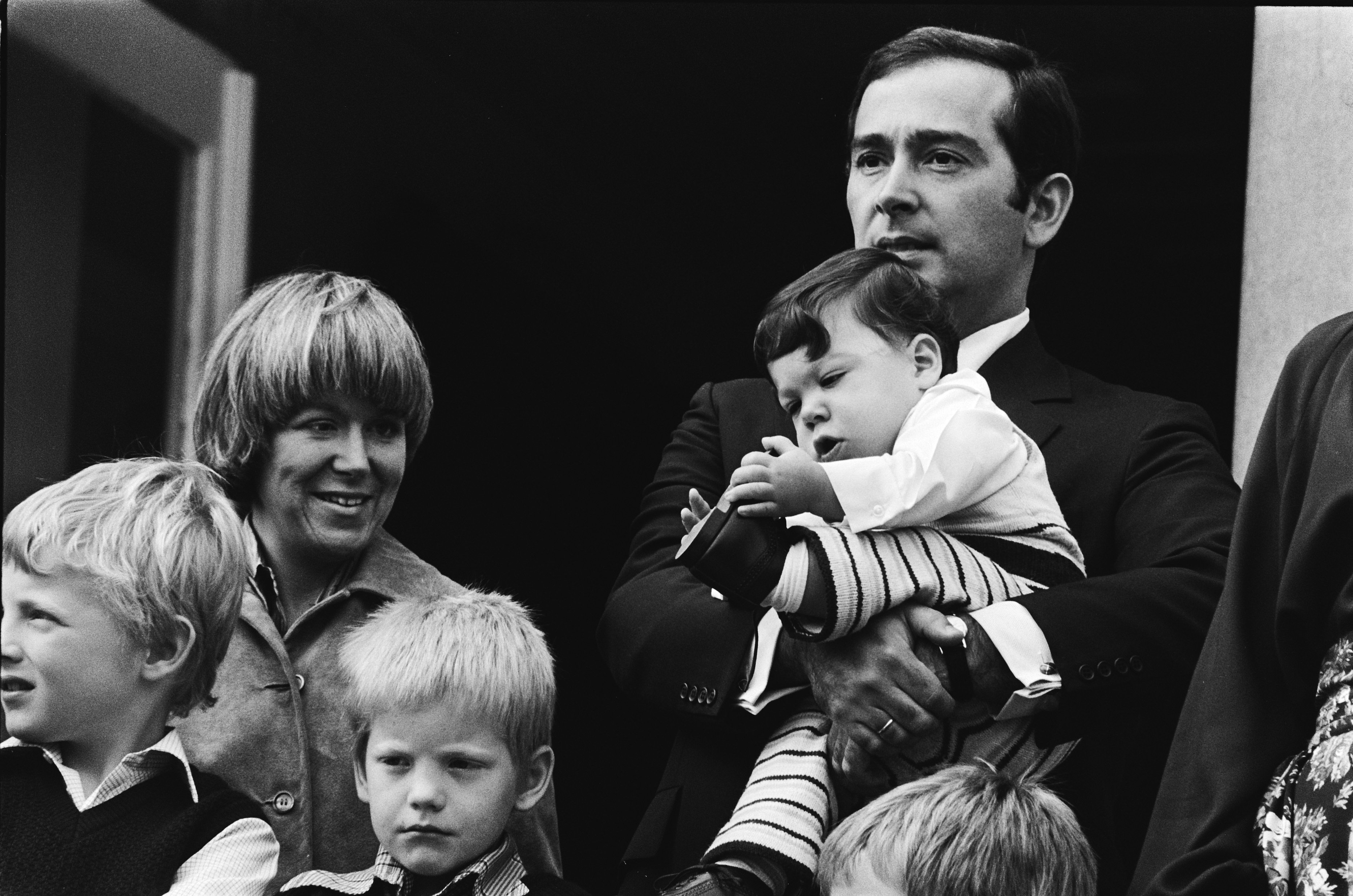
Princess Christina and Jorge Guillermo with Bernardo in 1978

While living in New York as Christina van Oranje, the Princess started a relationship with Cuban exile Jorge Guillermo.

Although societal attitudes were changing, because Guillermo was a Catholic, it was still possible that a marriage could cause a public scandal in the Netherlands such as the one that occurred in 1964 when Christina's sister Princess Irene married the Catholic Prince Carlos Hugo of Bourbon-Parma. Accordingly, Princess Christina, at that time ninth in line for the Dutch throne, renounced her and her descendants' rights to the throne before officially announcing her engagement on St. Valentine's Day, 1975. She converted to Catholicism in 1992.

The couple were married on 28 June 1975, civilly in Baarn and then religiously in an ecumenical ceremony in the Cathedral of Saint Martin, Utrecht. After their wedding, they lived in New York but later moved to the Netherlands, where they built Villa Eikenhorst in Wassenaar, near The Hague. The couple built up an extensive art collection. They had three children:

- Bernardo Federico Thomas Guillermo (born 17 June 1977, Utrecht), has two children with Eva-Marie Prinz-Valdez (born 16th January 1978)
  - Isabel Christina Guillermo (13 April 2009).
  - Julián Jorge Guillermo (21 September 2011).
- Nicolás Daniel Mauricio Guillermo (born 6 July 1979, Utrecht), has two children with Leah-Michelle Pilon:
  - Joaquín Christiaan Guillermo (16 September 2020).
  - Carmen Ester Ruby Guillermo (10 April 2023).
- Juliana Edenia Antonia Guillermo (born 8 October 1981, Utrecht), has three children with Tao Bodhi:
  - Kai Bodhi Guillermo (12 September 2014).
  - Numa Bodhi Guillermo (born in 2016).
  - Aida Bodhi Guillermo (born in 2019).

By her request, the couple divorced on 25 April 1996.

== Career ==
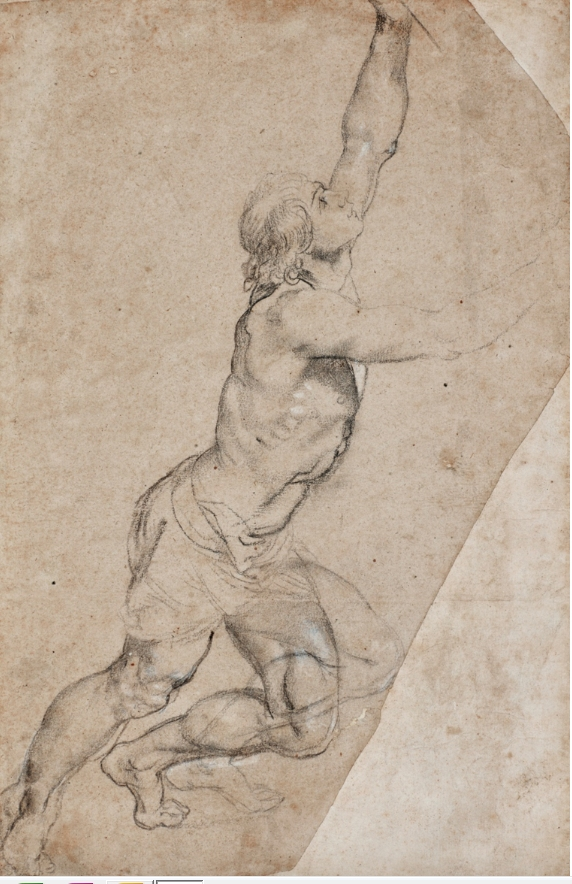
P.P. Rubens's drawing sold in 2019 by Princess Christina

She began teaching singing in New York after completing her vocal teaching studies at the École de musique Vincent-d’Indy in Montreal. She recorded and released several CDs (classical, Broadway) in 2000 and 2002, and was a long-term supporter of the Youth Music Foundation in the Netherlands. In 1989, she allowed her name to be used for the Prinses Christina Concours, an annual competition held in the Netherlands to encourage the musical talents of children in the Netherlands.

One of her few public performances was at the marriage of her nephew Prince Bernhard Jr. She also sang at the funerals of both of her parents Princess Juliana and Prince Bernhard in the New Church (Delft).

She completed a dance therapist training and in the later part of her career worked with sound and dance therapy. She worked to share her knowledge in the fields of dance/sound therapy and physical contact with the blind. She worked for the Visio foundation in the towns of Huizen and Breda to achieve this.

Early 2019, Christina made headlines when she decided to sell several works of art. These works came to her through inheritance from the Dutch royal family: art lover William II of the Netherlands. Dutch institutions including the Museum Boymans Van Beuningen did not have enough funds to purchase the major piece of the auction, an anatomical drawing by Peter Paul Rubens. It was sold by Sotheby's for $8.2 million.

== Death ==
In June 2018, it was announced that Princess Christina had been diagnosed with bone cancer. She died on 16 August 2019, aged 72. Her body was taken to Fagel's Garden Pavilion near Noordeinde Palace for a private service held on 22 August, and her remains were cremated.

== Titles, styles and honours ==
Styles of Princess Christina of The Netherlands
- Reference style: Her Royal Highness
- Spoken style: Your Royal Highness

=== Honours ===
==== National honours ====
- Knight Grand Cross of the Order of the Lion of the Netherlands
- Recipient of the Silver Wedding Anniversary Medal of Queen Juliana and Prince Bernhard 1962
- Recipient of the Wedding Medal of Princess Beatrix, Princess of Orange and Claus von Amsberg 1966
- Recipient of the Queen Beatrix Inauguration Medal 1980
- Recipient of the Wedding Medal of Prince Willem-Alexander, Prince of Orange and Máxima Zorreguieta 2002
- Recipient of the King Willem-Alexander Inauguration Medal 2013

==== Foreign honours ====
- Luxembourg: Knight Grand Cross of the Order of the Oak Crown
- Kingdom of Nepal Nepalese Royal Family: Member Grand Cross of the Royal Order of the Three Divine Powers
