= Baarn =

- Municipality
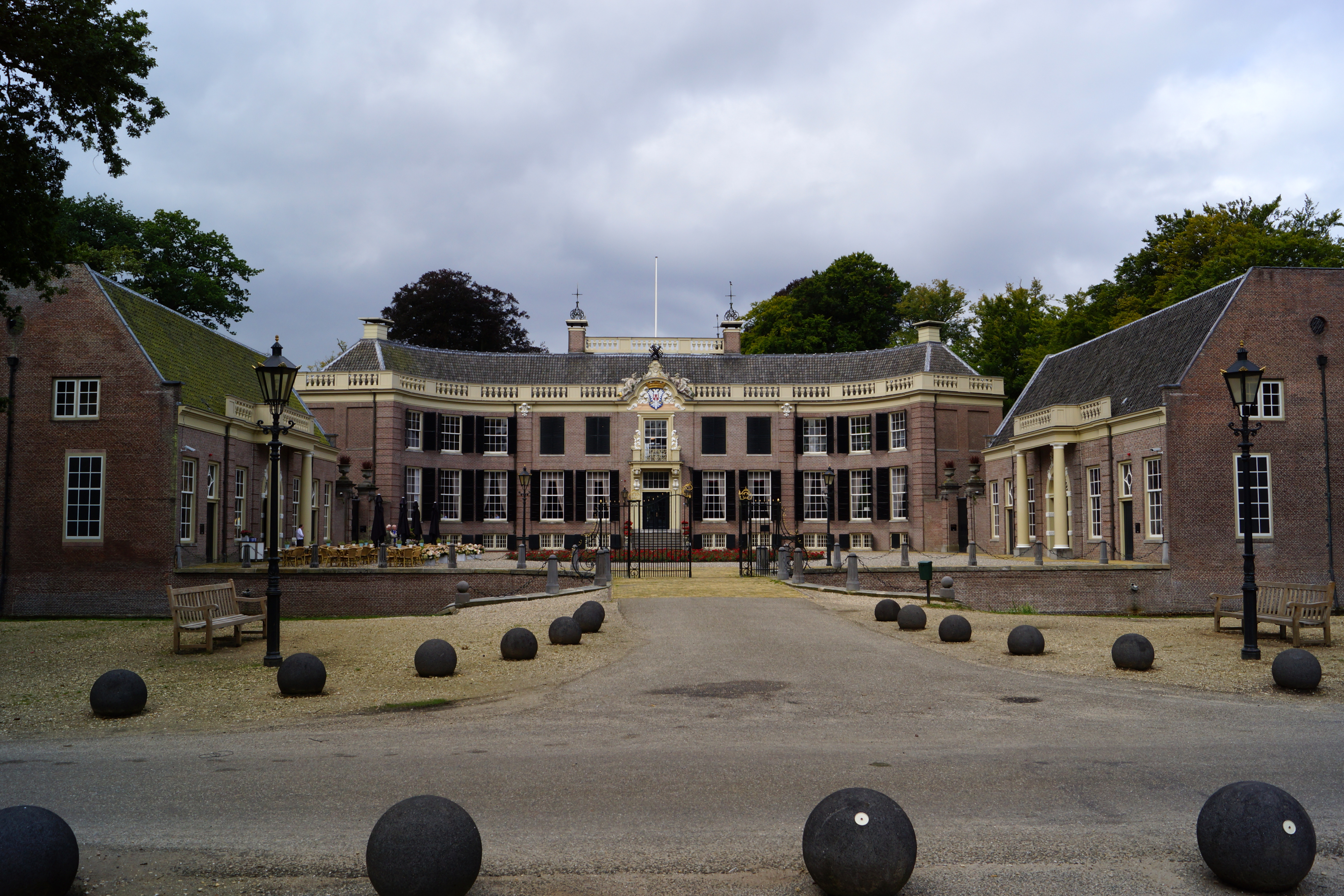
- Groeneveld Castle in Baarn

- Flag Coat of arms

- Location in Utrecht
- Coordinates: 52°13′N 5°17′E
- Country: Netherlands
- Province: Utrecht

Government
  - Body: Municipal council
  - Mayor: Mark Röell (VVD)

Area
  - Total: 33.01 km^{2} (12.75 sq mi)
  - Land: 32.54 km^{2} (12.56 sq mi)
  - Water: 0.47 km^{2} (0.18 sq mi)
- Elevation: 6 m (20 ft)

Population (January 2021)
  - Total: 24,792
  - Density: 762/km^{2} (1,970/sq mi)
- Demonyms: Baarnaar, Barenaar
- Time zone: UTC+1 (CET)
  - Summer (DST): UTC+2 (CEST)
- Postcode: 3740–3749
- Area code: 035
- Website: www.baarn.nl

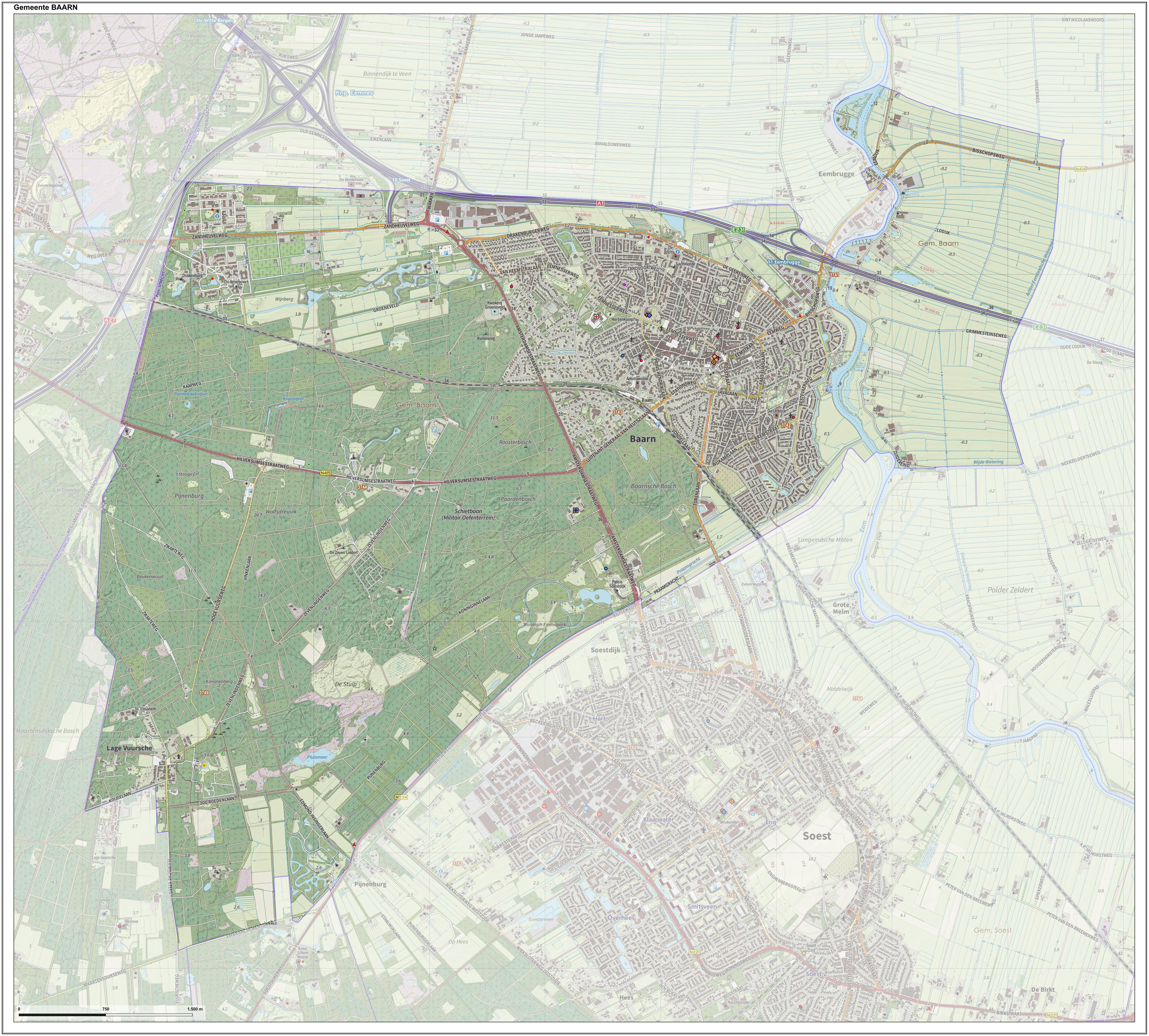
Topographic map of Baarn, June 2015

Baarn (Dutch pronunciation: [baːr(ə)n]) is a municipality and a town in the Netherlands, near Hilversum in the province of Utrecht.

== The municipality of Baarn ==
The municipality of Baarn consists of the following towns: Baarn, Eembrugge, Lage Vuursche.

== The town of Baarn ==
Baarn, the main town of the municipality, received city rights in 1391. The town lies about 8 km east of Hilversum.

In 2001, the town of Baarn had a population of 22,871. The urban area of the town was 4.66 km^{2} (1.80 sq mi), and consisted of 10,076 residences.

The royal family owns several houses around Baarn. The Soestdijk Palace in Baarn was the home of Queen Emma, Queen Juliana and Juliana's husband prince Bernard. Crown prince Willem Alexander and his brothers attended school (Nieuwe Baarnse School and Het Baarnsch Lyceum) in Baarn when Queen Beatrix (then princess) and her family lived at Castle Drakesteijn in the village of Lage Vuursche, before they moved to The Hague in 1980. A piece of forest, the Baarnse Bos, is adjacent to the palace and historically belonged to it.

Baarn's shopping facilities are mainly located in the Laanstraat. Other visitor destinations include 'het Cantonspark' (a botanical garden) and Groeneveld Castle. In the north and east there are polders, and the river Eem. Recreation resources include the woodlands south-west of Baarn, connecting Baarn to Soestdijk, and called 'Het Baarnsche Bos'.

The Scout Centre Buitenzorg (Scouting Nederland) is located in Baarn.

To the south lay the connecting road towards the city of Amersfoort, called 'Breemeentje'. This, approx. 10 km long straight of polder road, connects the town of Baarn to various roads in Soest and the industrial area of Amersfoort.

Due to good communications with Amsterdam, the town is home to a number of boutique international firms such as SEI Investments Company, Cerberus Capital Management and Conimex are located in Baarn.

== Transport ==
Baarn has a railway station - Baarn railway station, with trains going every half-hour to Utrecht (Utrecht Centraal, 35 minutes), Amersfoort (Amersfoort Centraal, 10 minutes) and Amsterdam (Amsterdam Centraal, about 40 minutes).

The A1 motorway runs just north of Baarn.

== Vessels ==
Freighter SS 'Baarn' (1927) of the Koninklijke Nederlandse Stoomboot-Maatschappij, assigned to the allied invasion fleet for Sicily and sailing in convoy KWS 16, loaded from Alexandria with tanks, trucks, ammunition and petrol (in cans) and 4 LCMs, under captain LH Mager, 11 July 1943, anchored off the coast of Sicily, on the roadstead of Avola, attacked by 12 German bombers. The 'Baarn' is hit and catches fire. All those on board manage to save themselves and are on the landing beach within an hour. The 'Baarn' will later be sunk as a wreck by British warships.

== Notable residents ==
=== Royalty ===
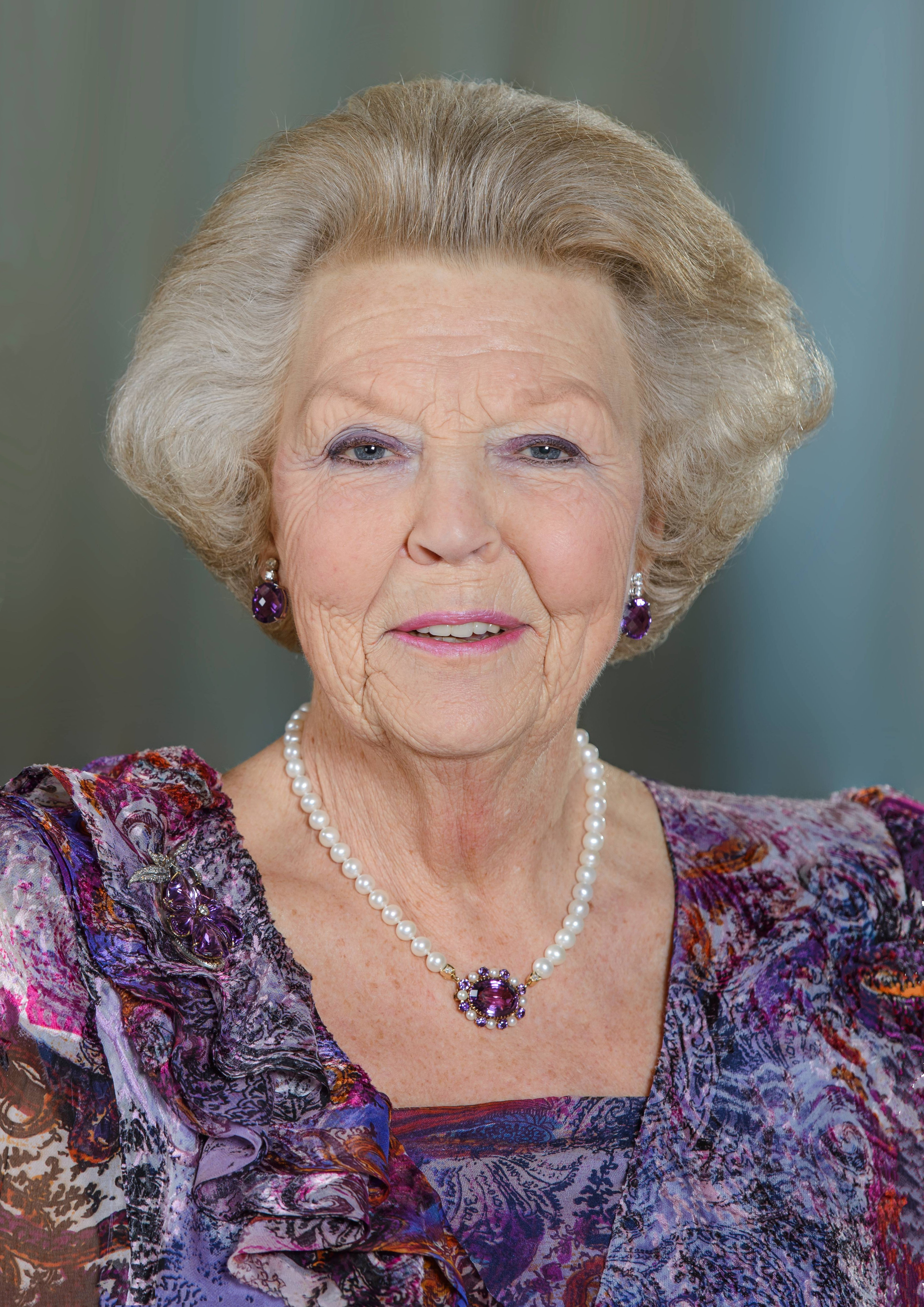
Princess Beatrix, 2015

- Prince Ernest Casimir of the Netherlands (1822 in Baarn – 1822) the fourth son of the Prince of Orange, later King William II of the Netherlands
- Beatrix of the Netherlands (born 1938 in Baarn) Queen of the Netherlands 1980-2013
- Princess Irene of the Netherlands (born 1939 in Baarn) the second child of Queen Juliana of the Netherlands
- Princess Christina of the Netherlands (born 1947 in Baarn – 2019) the youngest of four daughters of Queen Juliana of the Netherlands

=== Intellectual and public service ===
- Michiel Horn FRSC (born 1939 in Baarn) a Canadian professor and historian
- Bauke Roolvink (1912 – 1979 in Baarn) a Dutch politician and a trade union leader
- Edith Schippers (born 1964) a former politician, was Minister of Healthcare, lives in Baarn
- John D. Stamford (1939-1994) paedophilia advocate and founder of Spartacus International Gay Guide, lived in Baarn

=== Arts ===
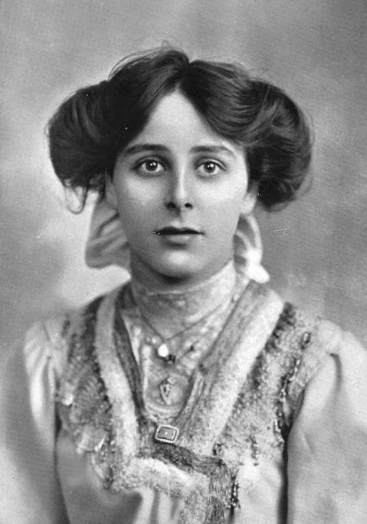
Betty Callish, 1906

- Betty Callish (1886 – after 1941), actress, singer and violinist
- M. C. Escher (1898–1972), graphic artist, lived and worked in Baarn 1941/1970
- Piet Esser (1914–2004), sculptor
- Lia Dorana (1918 2010 in Lage Vuursche), comedian and actress
- Albert Muis (1941–1988), artist
- Tineke de Nooij (born 1941), radio and TV presenter
- Joop van den Ende (born 1942) a Dutch theatrical producer and media tycoon, lives in Baarn
- Yorick van Wageningen (born 1964), actor
- Martin Majoor (born 1960), type designer and graphic designer
- Marlayne (born 1971), singer

=== Sport ===
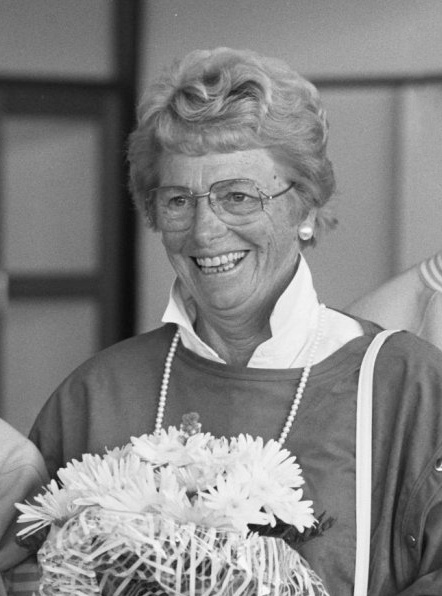
Fanny Blankers-Koen, 1988

- Fanny Blankers-Koen (1918 in Lage Vuursche – 2004) a Dutch track and field athlete, won four gold medals at the 1948 Summer Olympics
- Jan van Gooswilligen (born 1935 in Baarn - 2008) a former Dutch field hockey player, participated in two Olympic Games 1960 Summer Olympics 1964 Summer Olympics
- André Hoekstra (born 1962 in Baarn) a retired Dutch footballer with over 300 club caps
- Maryse Abendanon (born 1966) a former Dutch field hockey player, lives in Baarn
- Diederik van Weel (born 1973 in Baarn) field hockey player, team gold medallist at the 2000 Summer Olympics
- Dustley Mulder (born 1985 in Baarn) a Curaçaoan footballer with over 300 club caps
- Ilse van der Meijden (born 1988 in Baarn) a water polo player, team gold medallist at the 2008 Summer Olympics
- Sharon van Rouwendaal (born 1993 in Baarn) a Dutch distance swimmer and a gold medalist at the 2016 Summer Olympics

== Gallery ==
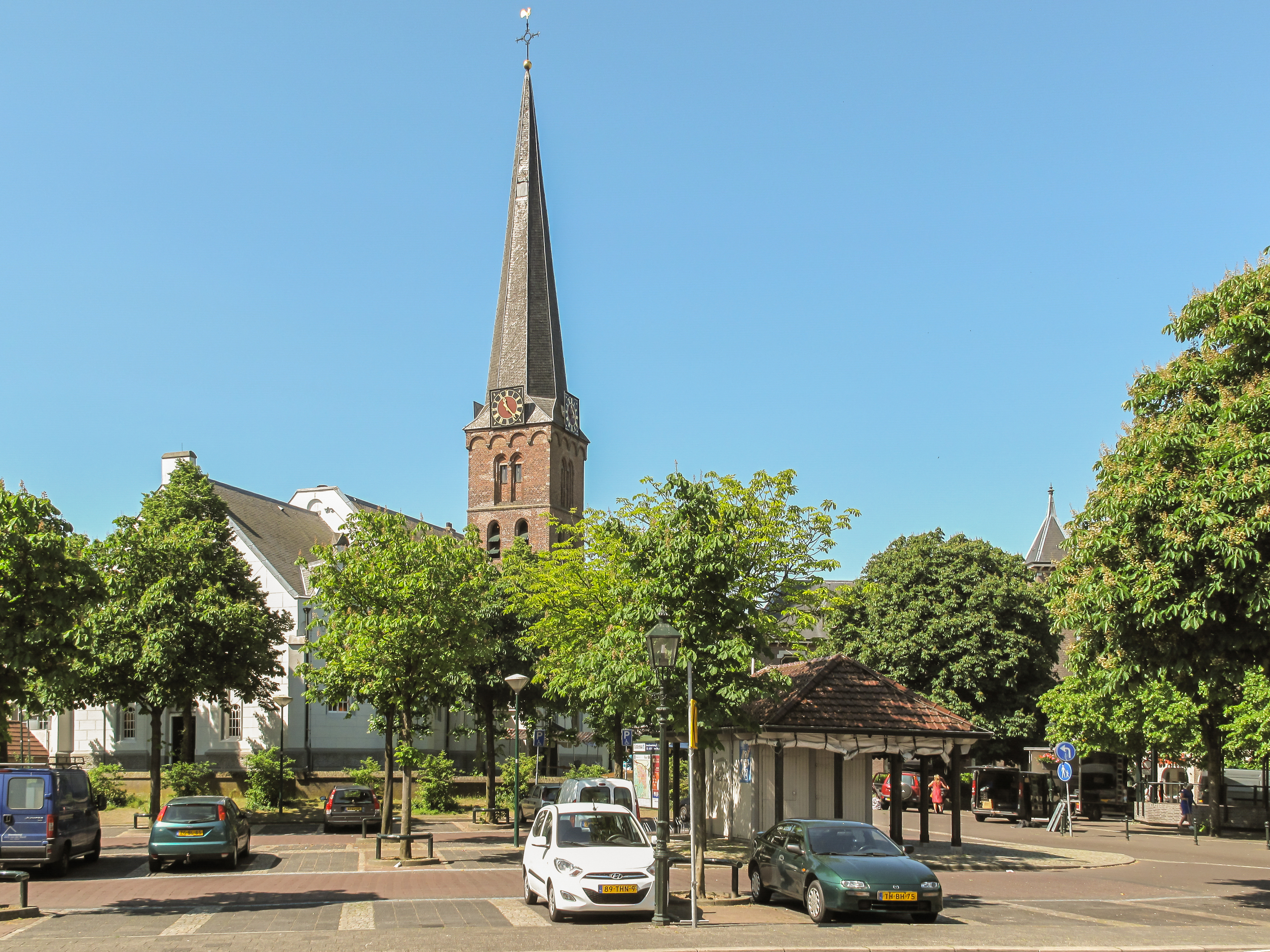
Church: the Pauluskerk

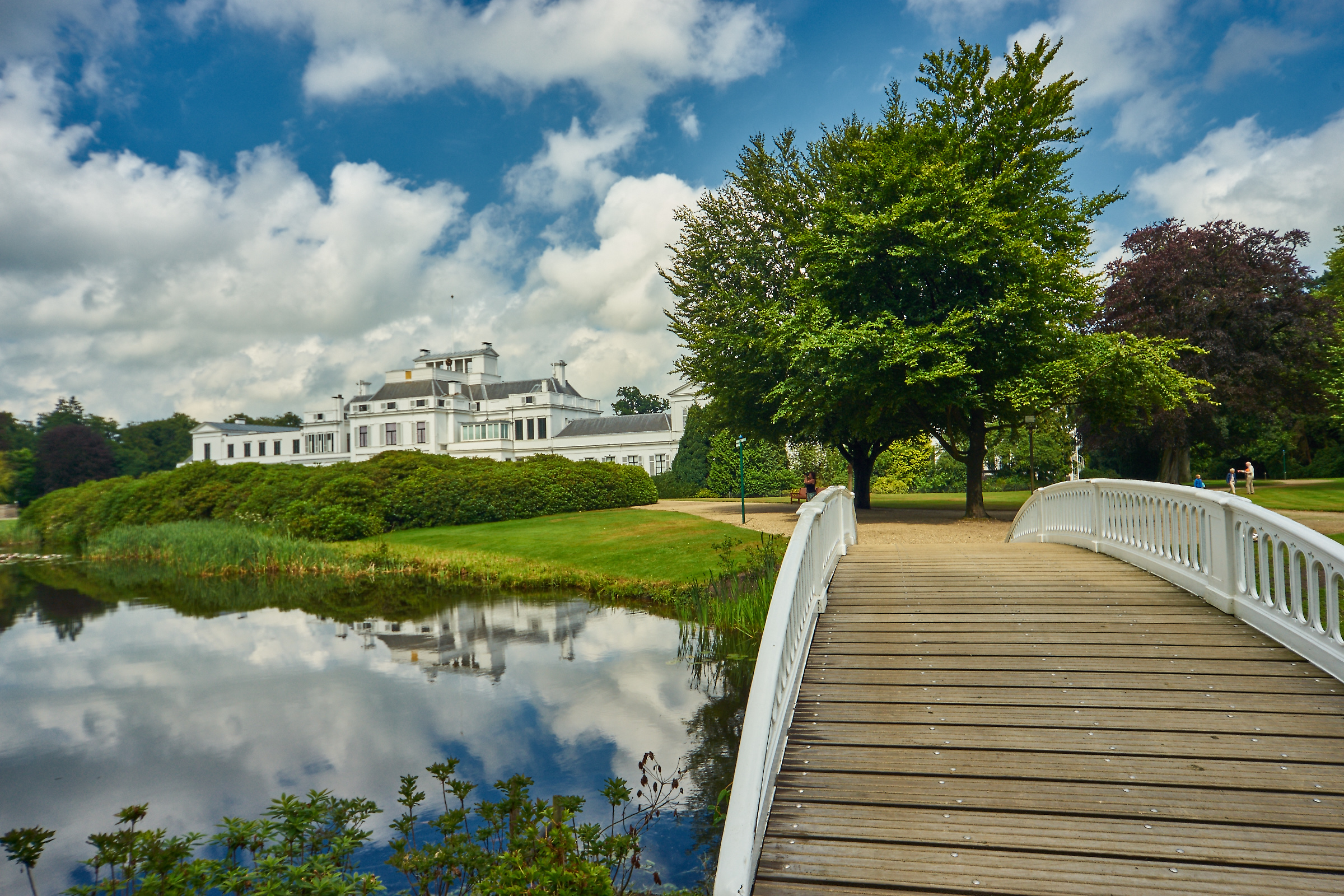
Cast iron bridge over the pond at Soestdijk Palace

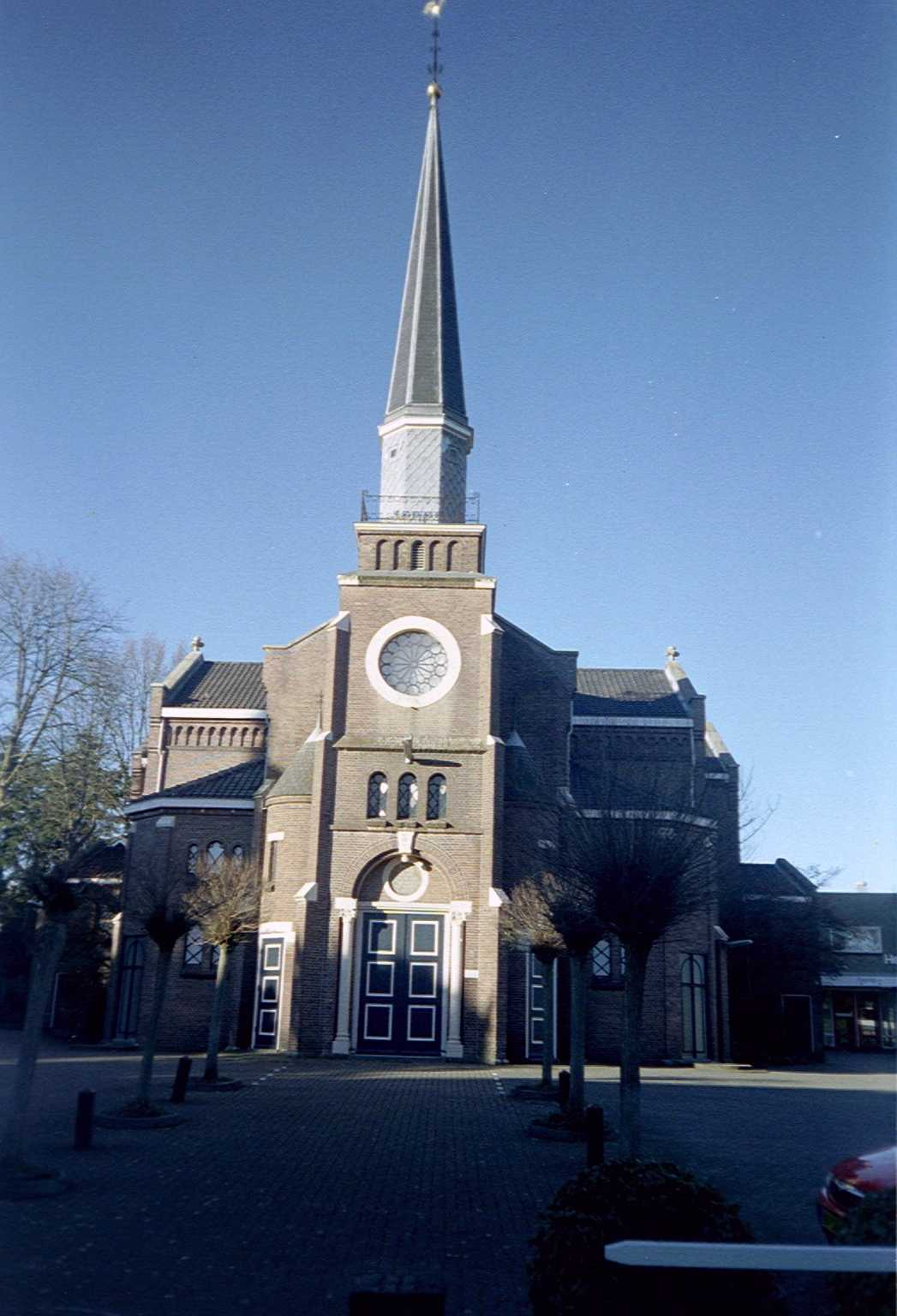
Paaskerk (Easter Church) in Baarn

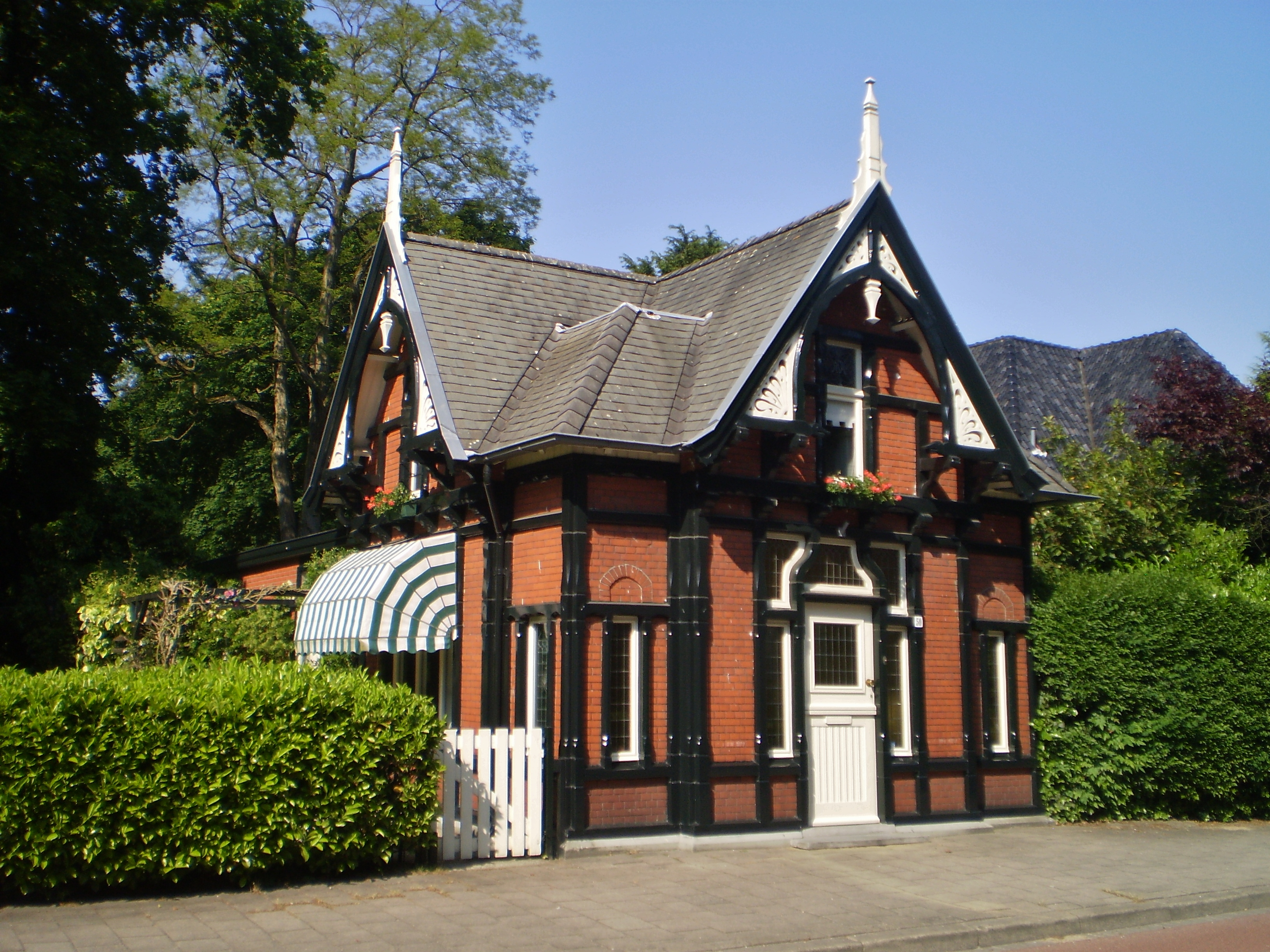
Baarn Telefoonhuisje

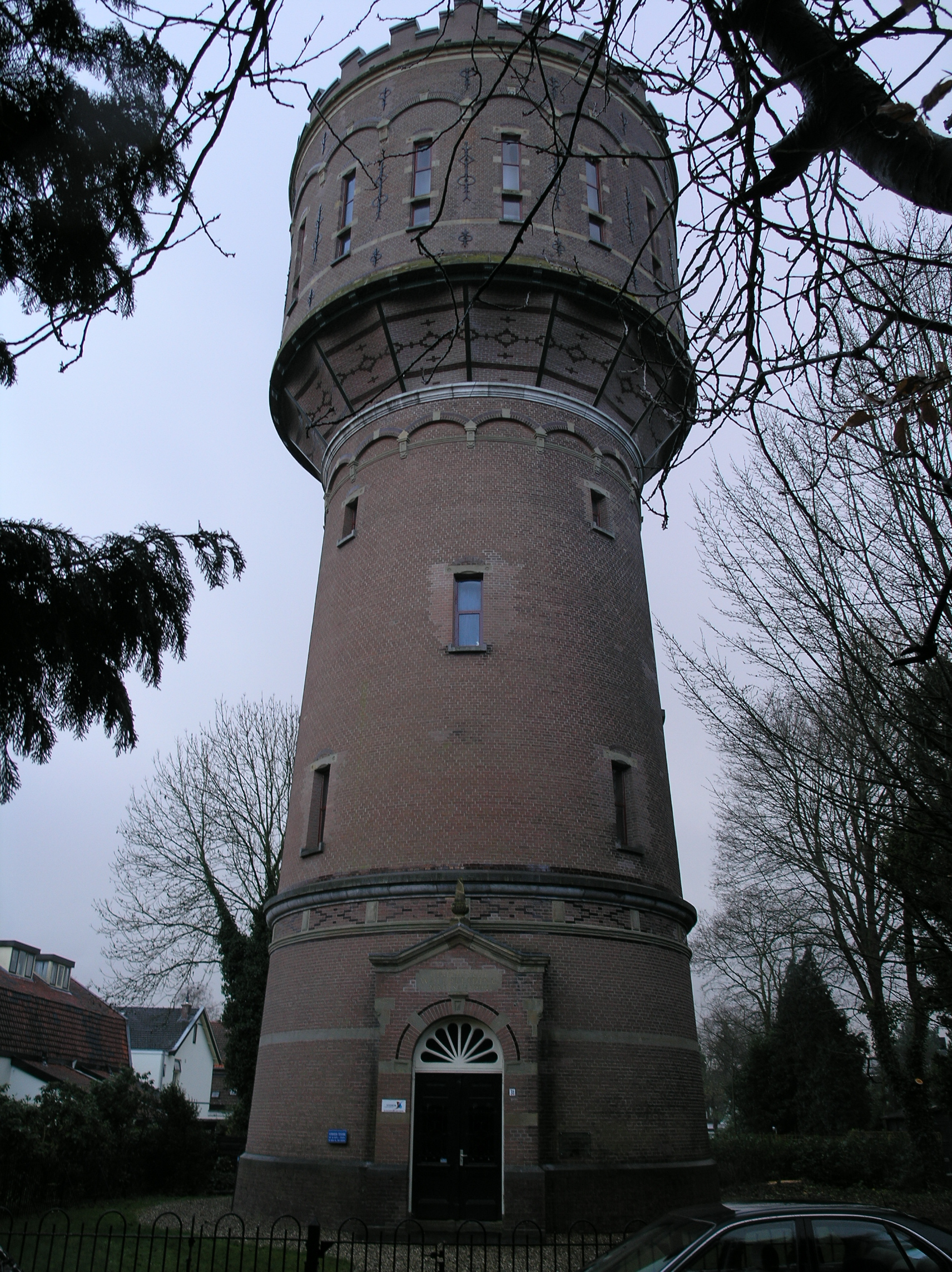
Baarn Watertoren

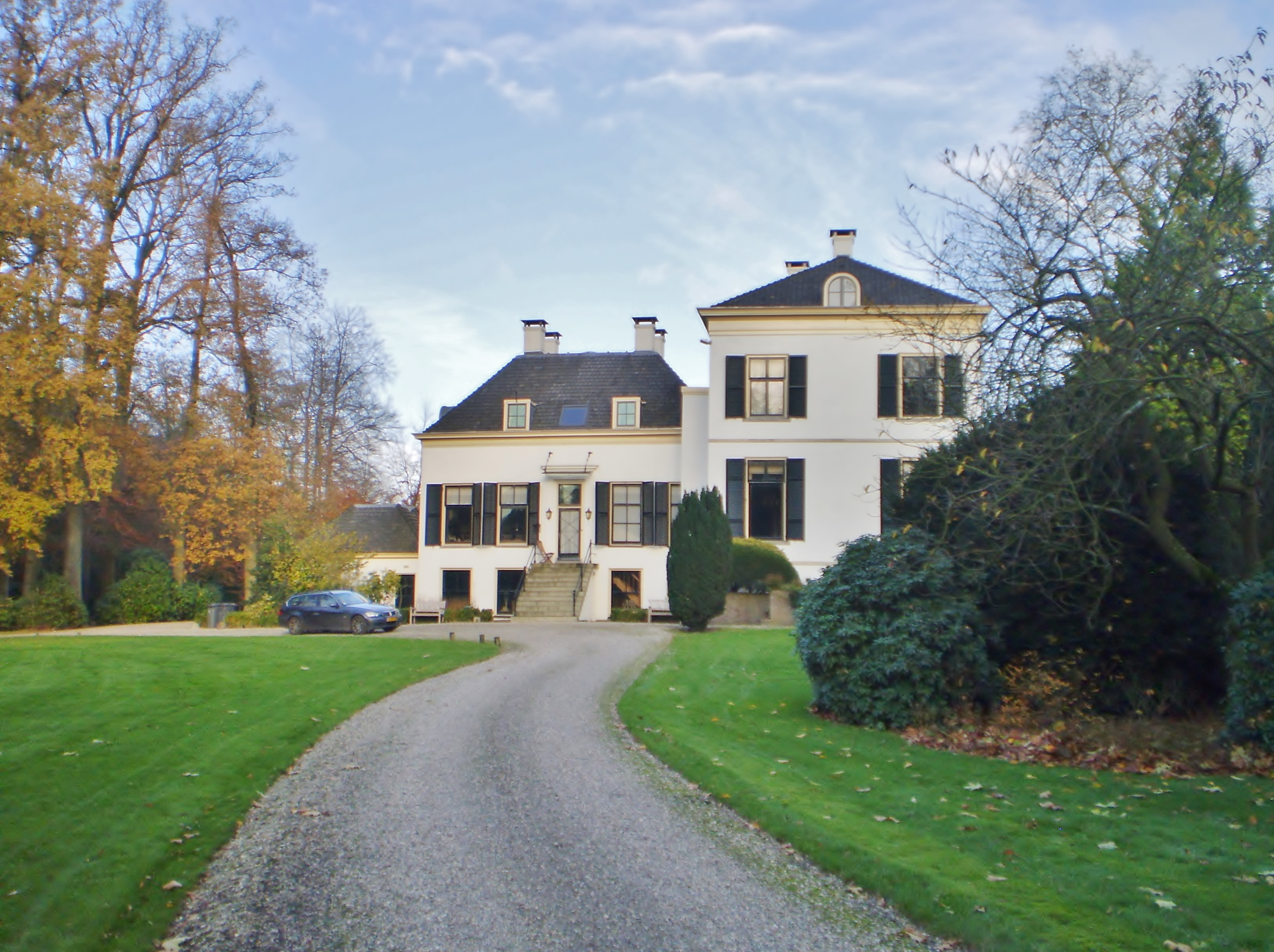
Baarn Pijnenburg westzijde
