= Soestdijk Palace =

Royal property in the Netherlands

- Paleis Soestdijk
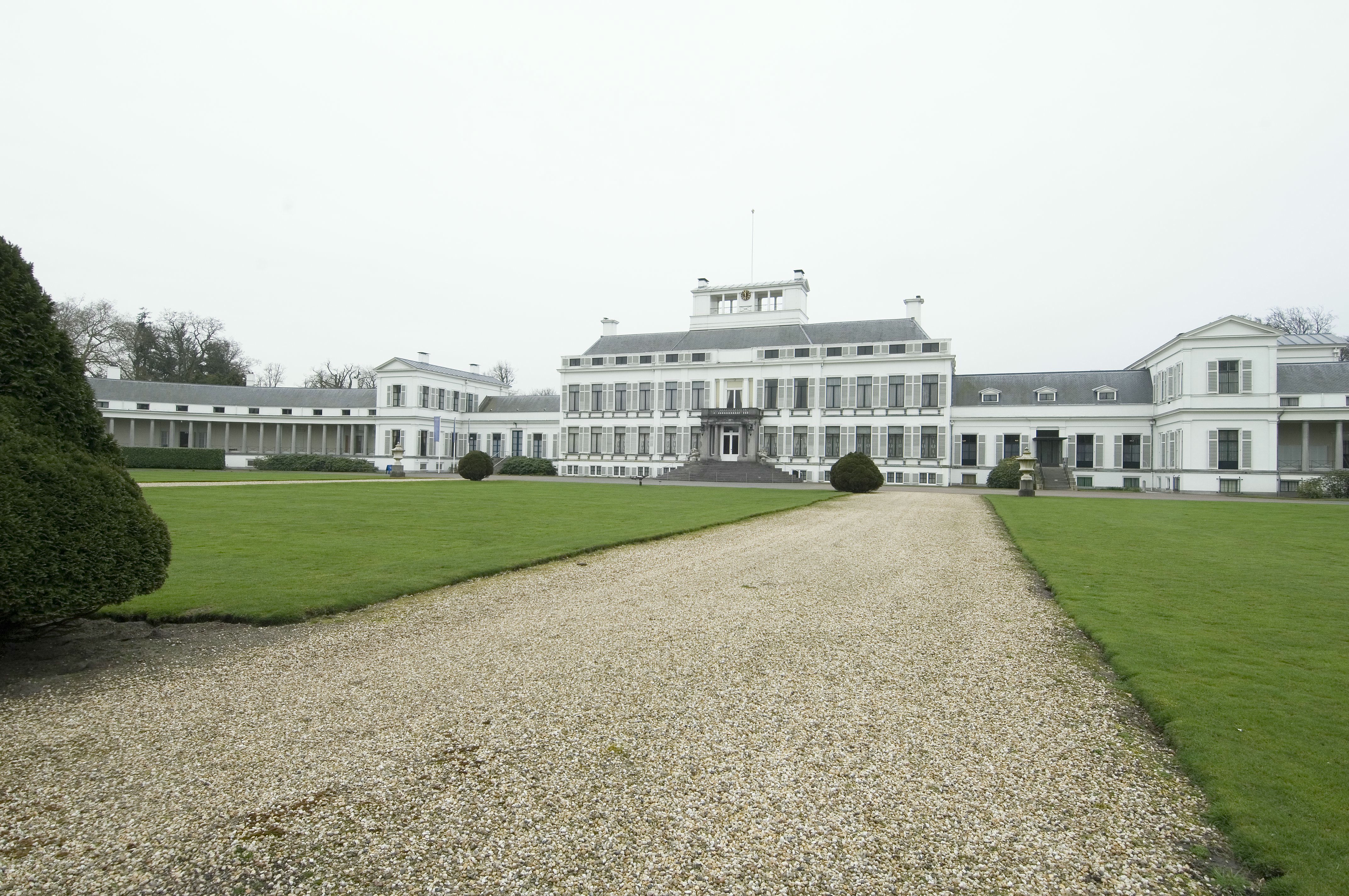
- A front view of the palace
- Former names: de Hofstede aen Zoestdijck

General information
- Type: Buitenplaats
- Architectural style: Neoclassical
- Location: Amsterdamsestraatweg 1, Baarn, Netherlands
- Coordinates: 52.193333°N 5.279444°E
- Construction started: 1650; 376 years ago
- Renovated: 1674–1678; 1806; 1808; 1815; 1897; 1936–1937; 1970
- Client: Cornelis de Graeff
- Owner: Made By Holland consortium

Technical details
- Floor count: 3
- Lifts/elevators: 2

Design and construction
- Architect: Maurits Post
- Designations: Rijksmonument

Other information
- Number of rooms: 170

Soestdijk Palace (Dutch: Paleis Soestdijk [paːˈlɛi(s) suzˈdɛik]) is a palace formerly belonging to the Dutch royal family. It consists of a central block and two wings.

Although named after the village of Soestdijk, which is largely in the municipality of Soest, Soestdijk Palace is just north of the border in the municipality of Baarn in the province of Utrecht. It was the home for over six decades of Queen Juliana of the Netherlands and her husband, Prince Bernhard, until their deaths in 2004.

== History ==
=== De Graeff ===
In the middle of the seventeenth century, the country house on the Zoestdijk was built for Cornelis de Graeff. In the years 1655–1660, de Graeff was involved in the education of William III of Orange, as can be seen from his letters in Soestdijk to the States General and his nephew Johan de Witt. During the summers, the family spent a lot of time at the palace, and de Graeff's sons (Pieter and Jacob de Graeff) played with the young William. In 1674, after the rampjaar, Jacob de Graeff sold the property for the low price of 18,755 guilders to Stadtholder William III.

=== Orange-Nassau ===
The palace originally started as a hunting lodge that was built between 1674 and 1678 by Maurits Post, who was also involved in building two other royal palaces, Huis ten Bosch Palace and Noordeinde Palace. William left the Netherlands in 1688 to reside in London as William III of England.

A forest, the Baarnse Bos, is adjacent to the palace. It was developed as a French landscape garden between 1733 and 1758.

During the French invasion in 1795, the palace was seized as a spoil of war and turned into an inn for French troops. When Louis Bonaparte became King of Holland, he took possession of it and had it extended and refurnished.

It was presented to the Prince of Orange (the later William II of the Netherlands) in 1815 in recognition of his services at the Battle of Waterloo. From 1816 to 1821, the palace was significantly expanded by adding two wings, the northern or Baarn wing, and the southern or Soest wing. In 1842, its contents were enriched by the addition of the neoclassical furnishings of his former palace in Brussels, today the Palais des Académies.

William II and his wife Anna Pavlovna spent many summers at Soestdijk. Three of their children (Alexander, Henry, and Ernest Casimir) were born at the palace. The princes were taught military drill on the lawns by their father, who also had working miniature cannons made for them. After William II's death much of his property was sold off to settle his considerable debts. Anna Pavlovna bought Soestdijk and made it her summer residence. She designated rooms in the palace to preserving the memory of her late husband and son Alexander. After Anna Pavlovna died in 1865 she left Soestdijk to her son Henry, who died without issue in 1879. His brother king William III, the next owner, preferred Het Loo to Soestdijk. Only after his death in 1890 did the Royal family (which at the time consisted only of his widow Queen Emma and his daughter Queen Wilhelmina) start spending every other summer at the palace. This arrangement stayed more or less in place until Wilhelmina's marriage in 1901, when her court and her mother's court separated. Queen Emma kept Soestdijk as her summer residence until her death in 1934. The palace was mostly unused until Princess Juliana and her husband Prince Bernhard moved there after their wedding in 1937. As a gift to the newlyweds it was extensively renovated and modernised. In a break with tradition, Juliana didn't use Soestdijk as just a summer residence. Instead, she lived there fulltime, even after ascending the throne in 1948.

Soestdijk became the property of the state of the Netherlands in 1971, although it was used by Princess Juliana (Queen of the Netherlands from 1948 to 1980) and Prince Bernhard as their official residence until both of their deaths in 2004. Soestdijk Palace then remained empty and unused for over a year before its opening to the public. From spring 2006 to 2017, it was possible to visit, pending a decision about its future use.

=== Sale in 2017 ===
The palace was sold in 2017 to a consortium named "Made By Holland", which plans to develop a hotel, event centre and 65 houses on the grounds.

=== Royal Park Live ===
Since 2016, Paleis Soestdijk has hosted Royal Park Live, an annual music festival held each July. National and international artists perform in the historic gardens. The event attracts thousands of visitors and contributes to the cultural revitalization of the palace and its estate.

== Gallery ==
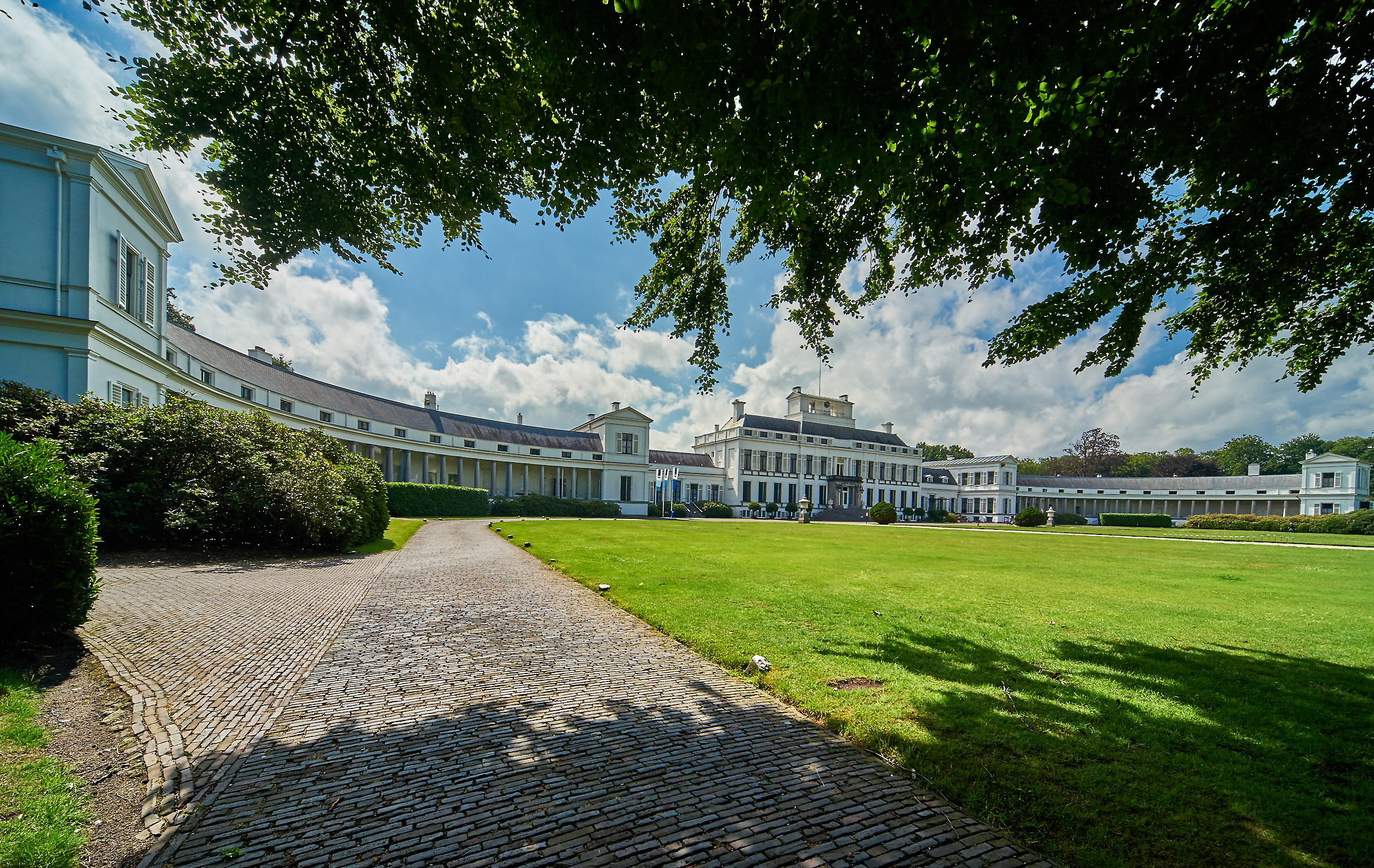
Front of the palace

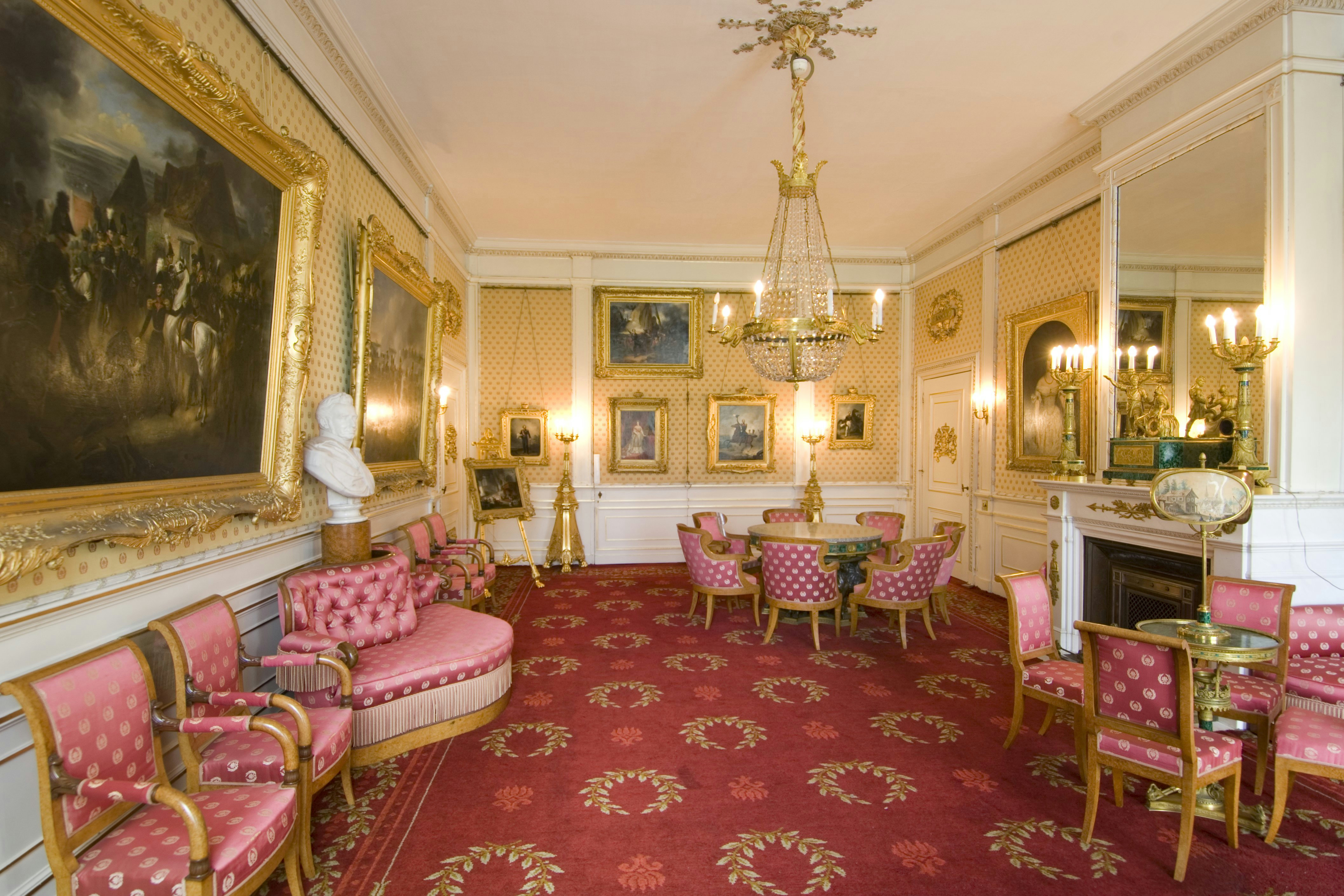
The Leuven room

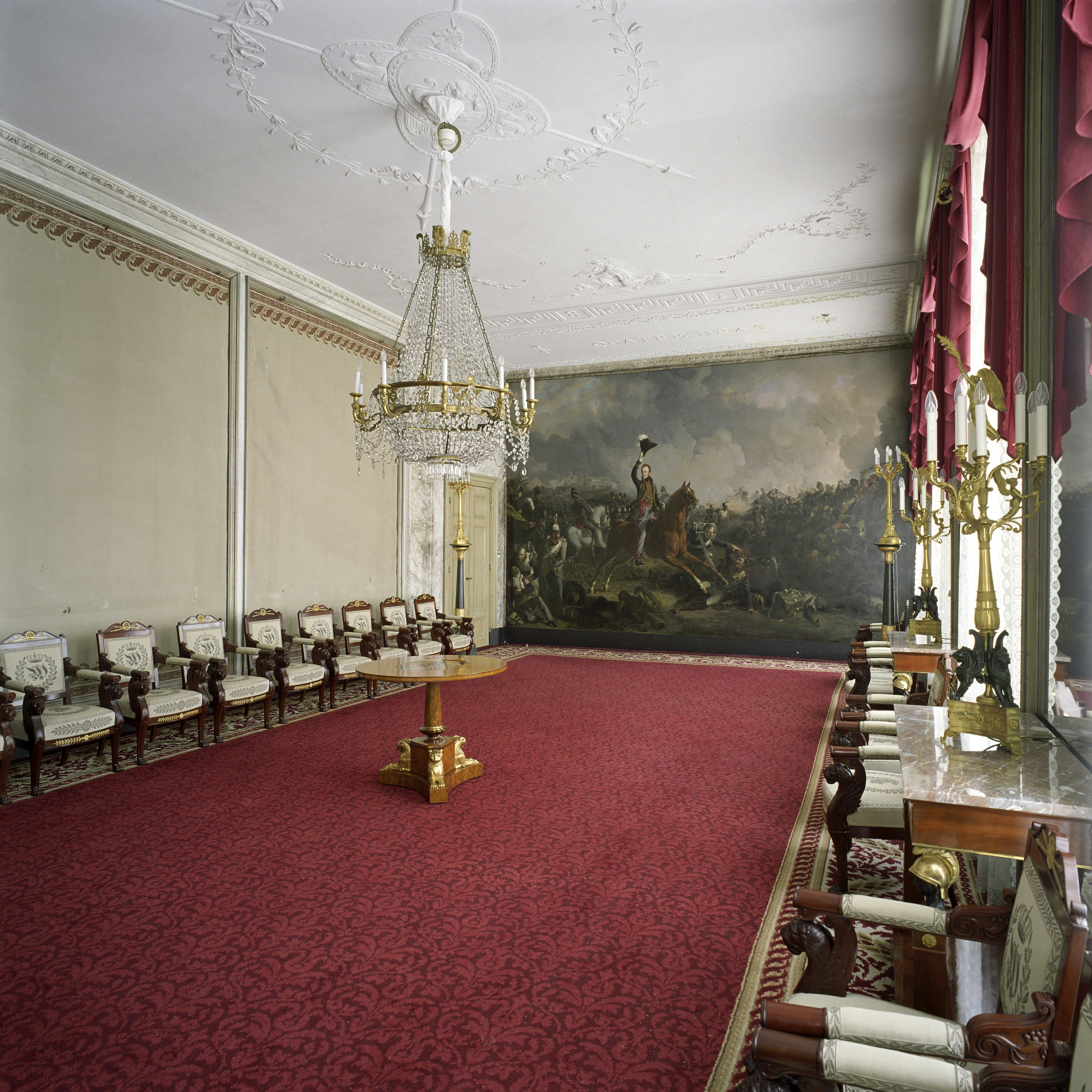
Waterloo Room

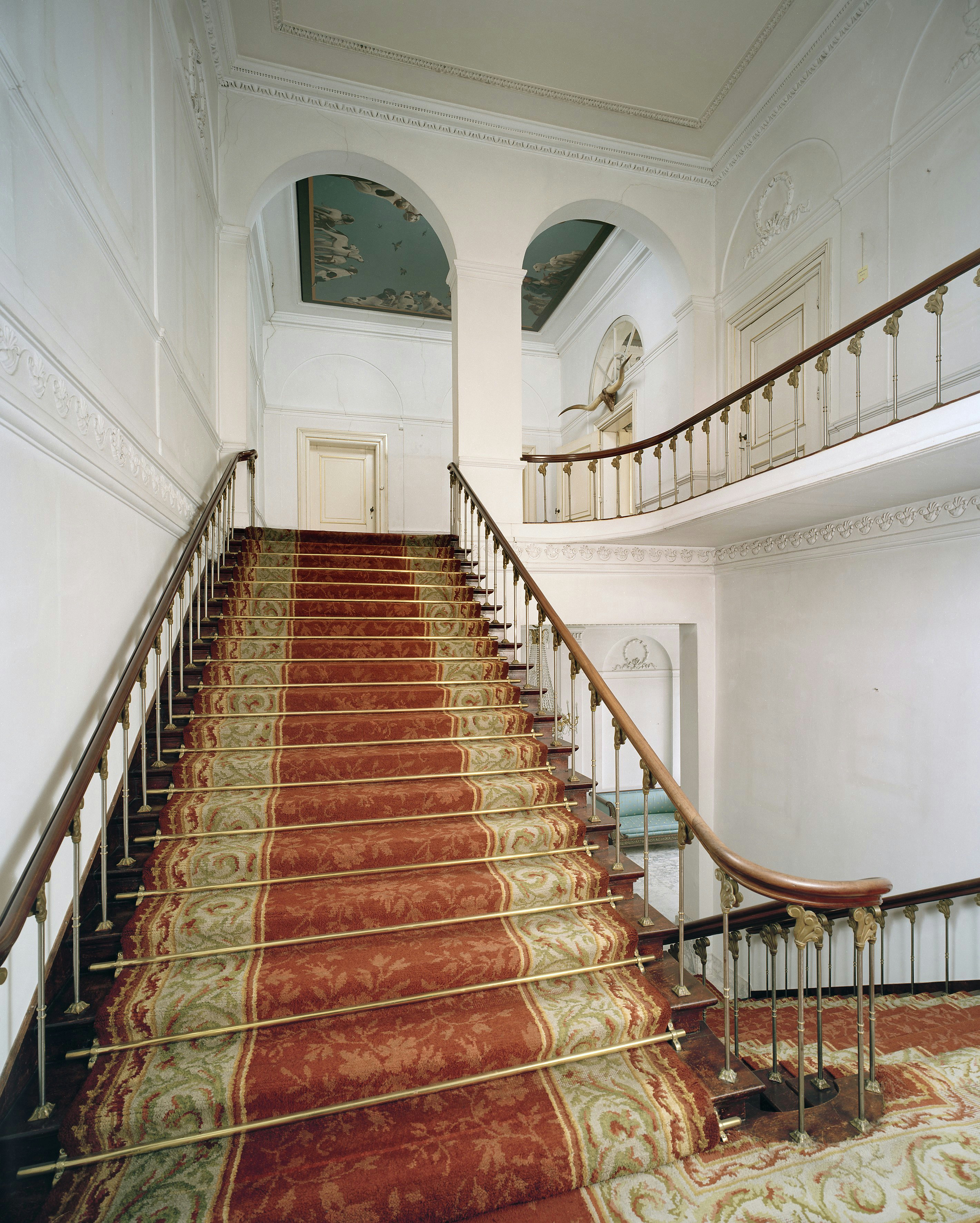
The stairs to the first floor.

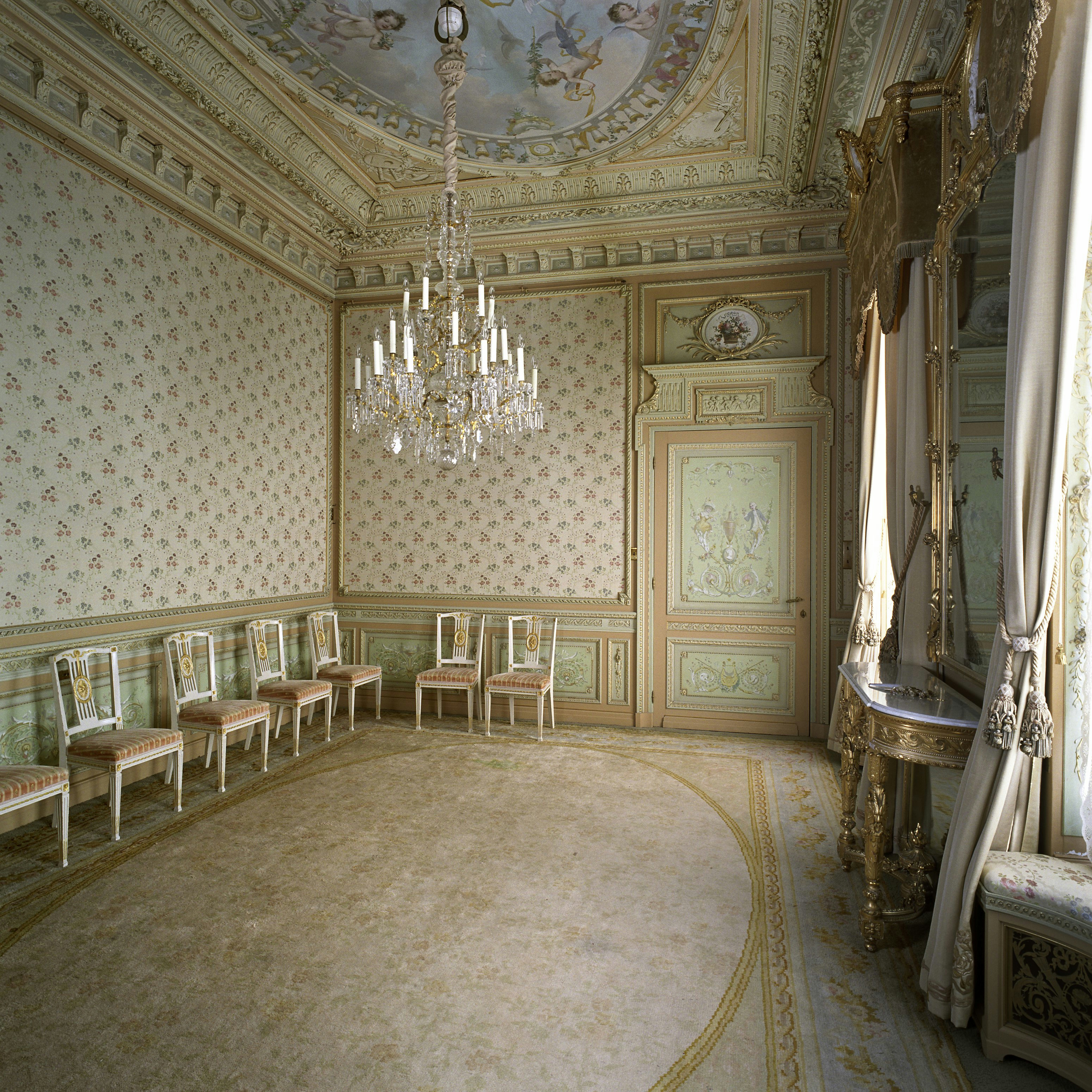
Anteroom richly decorated.

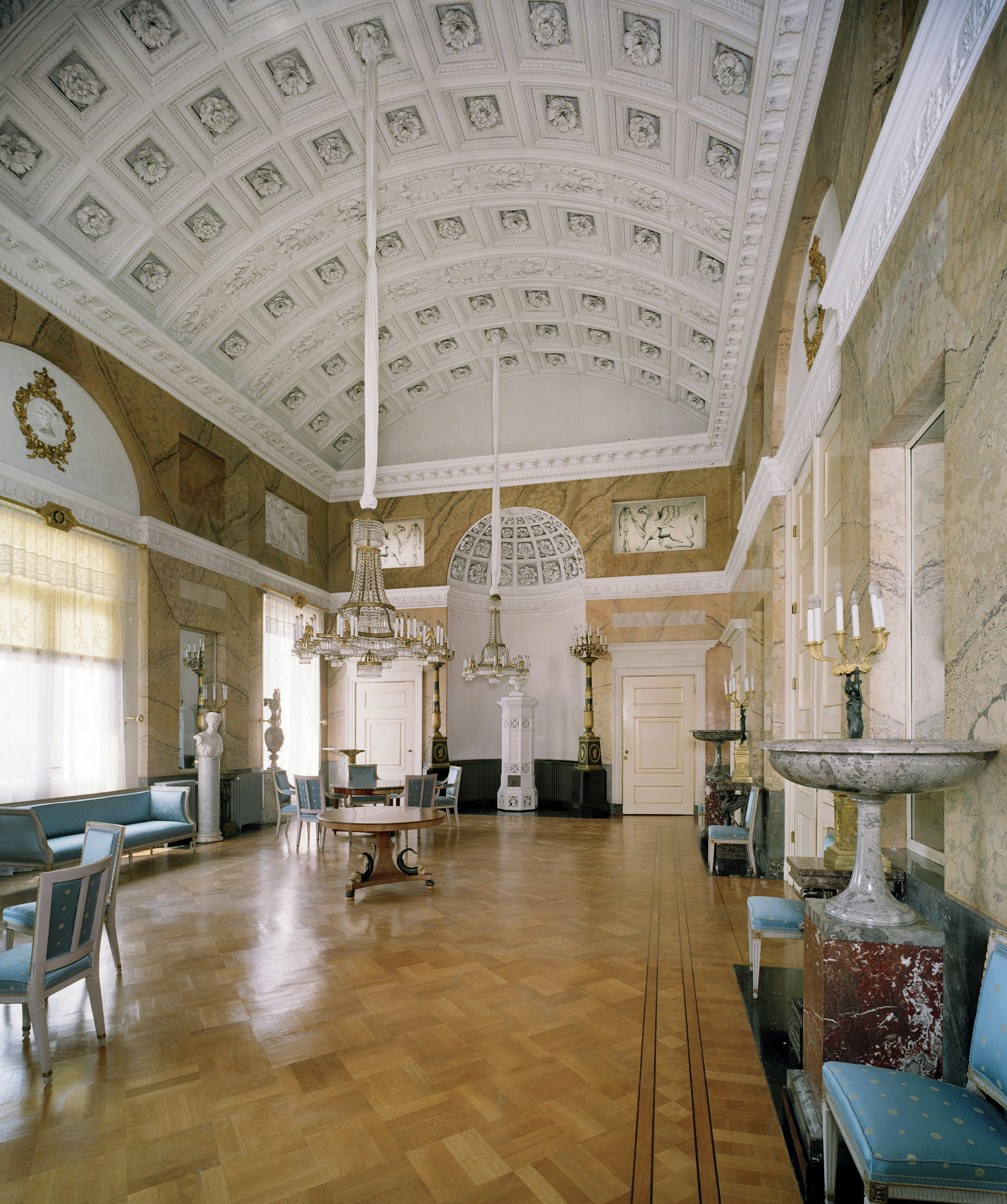
Ballroom

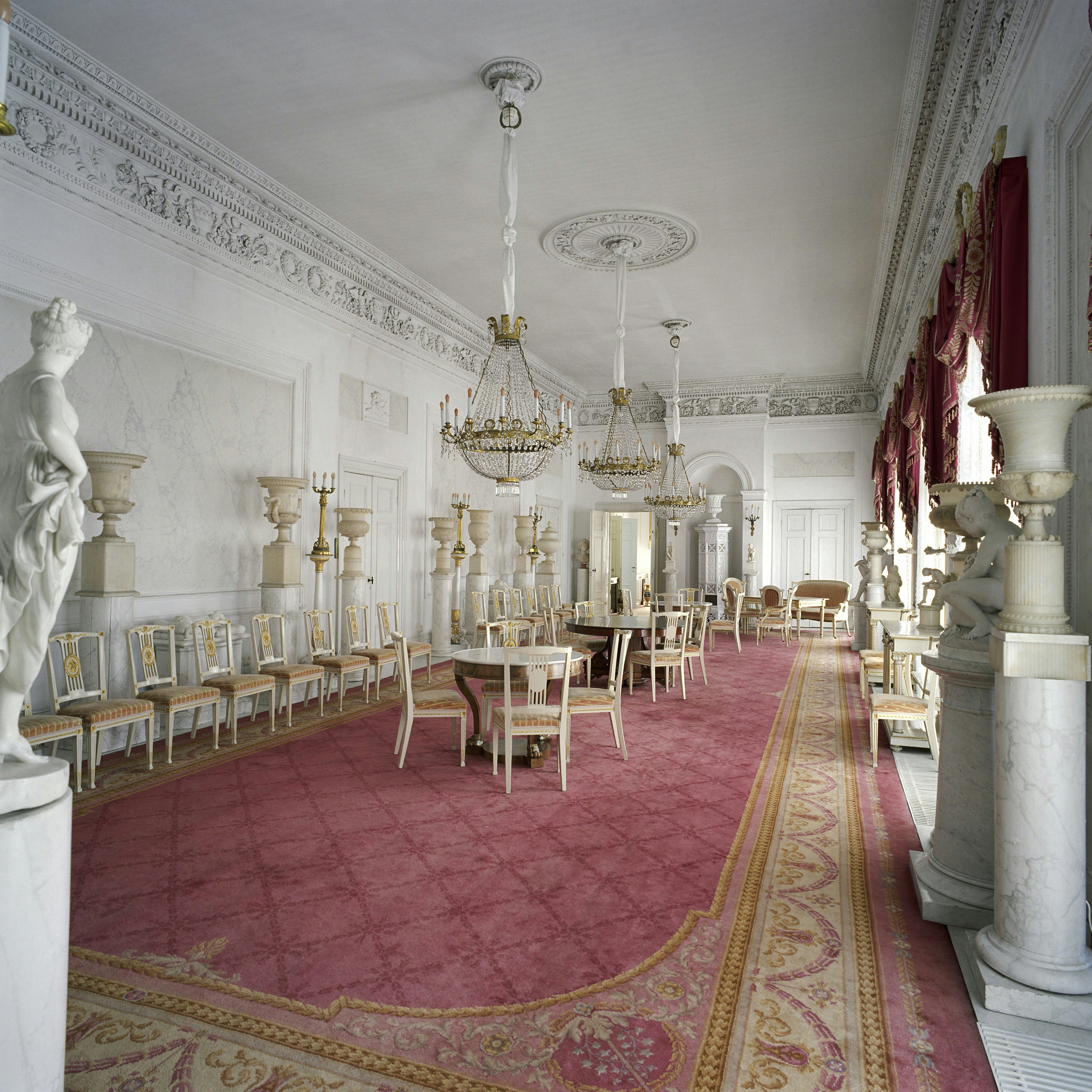
White Dinner Room

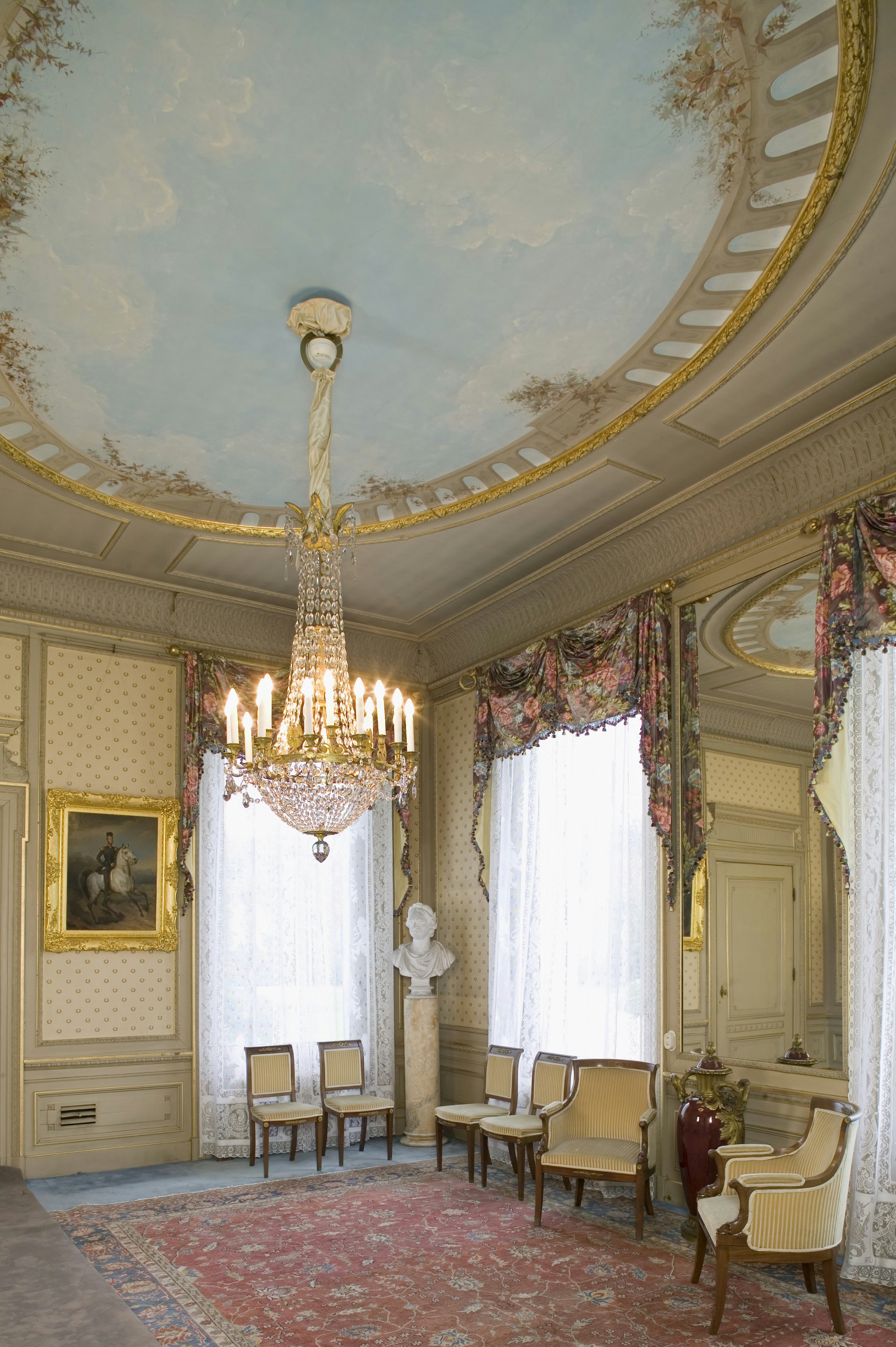
Empire Room
