= Pearson College UWC =

Lester B. Pearson United World College of the Pacific

Location
- Metchosin, British Columbia; Canada; 48°20′48″N 123°33′51″W

Information
- Type: International Baccalaureate World School
- Motto: Making education a force to unite people, nations and cultures for peace and a sustainable future
- Established: 1974
- President & Head of College: Jason McBride
- Enrollment: 200
- Publication: Pearson eNews
- Website: www.pearsoncollege.ca

Lester B. Pearson United World College of the Pacific (also referred to as Pearson College UWC) is one of eighteen schools and colleges around the world in the United World Colleges movement, located on Vancouver Island, British Columbia, Canada. It is named after the late Canadian prime minister Lester B. Pearson, winner of the 1957 Nobel Peace Prize, and an early champion of the college. The mission of the UWC movement and of the school is to "make education a force to unite people, nations and cultures for peace and a sustainable future".

More than 100 students are selected for each annual intake for the two-year program. In 2023-24, students represented over 100 countries and territories. The college offers the International Baccalaureate diploma, and the Climate Action Leadership Diploma program, an IB Career-related Program. Both pathways incorporate experiential education approaches for students generally aged 16 to 19.

== History ==
Lester Bowles Pearson, Nobel Peace Prize Laureate and former prime minister of Canada, was the driving force behind the founding of Pearson College UWC. After retiring from public life, Pearson became interested in the United World Colleges movement. At that time, only one United World College existed—Atlantic College in Wales, established in 1962. Pearson visited there in 1969 and met with students and faculty. He came away convinced that there must be more such colleges around the world and, in particular, one on Canada's west coast. He envisioned that:

"Students will be welcomed without regard to race, religion, or politics and we intend to establish scholarships so that the students who attend the college will be from all levels of society and will be genuine representatives of their own peoples. This system… could become a revolutionary force in international education."

Pearson became honorary chairman of a committee formed to build what was to be known as the College of the Pacific. He worked tirelessly in the early days of the planning process, but, died in December 1972, just as the project was getting underway. Soon after his death, it was decided that the college would be renamed Lester B. Pearson College of the Pacific, as a living memorial to his legacy. John Lang Nichol was chosen as initial chairman of the board of trustees and a major fundraising effort began, with over four million dollars raised, 83 per cent coming from individuals, corporations, and foundations, both domestic and foreign, and the remaining 17 per cent from governments around the world. Ground broke on the college's construction on 25 September 1973.

Over the next year, Jack Matthews, the founding director of the college, recruited a faculty of men and women from Canada and abroad and, on 25 September 1974, the inaugural cohort of 100 students arrived. An official opening the following year was attended by the Earl Mountbatten of Burma, then President of United World Colleges International Council, and Jean Chrétien.

Mountbatten's great-nephew, Prince Charles, Prince of Wales (now Charles III, King of Canada), who also served as President of UWC, established the Prince of Wales Scholarship and would visit the college again between 30 March and 3 April 1980 and 29 to 31 October 1982 and, in 2009, met with then-Director David Hawley and four Prince of Wales Scholarship recipients, one each from Kenya, Romania, Nicaragua, and Canada.

Up to 200 students have since attended each year; approximately 4,400 students have graduated from Pearson College UWC and alumni have built careers in a variety of sectors and professions in every corner of the globe. Pearson College UWC continues to be funded through individuals, alumni, corporations, foundations, select provincial and civic governments in Canada, and some UWC donors.

== Academics and administration ==
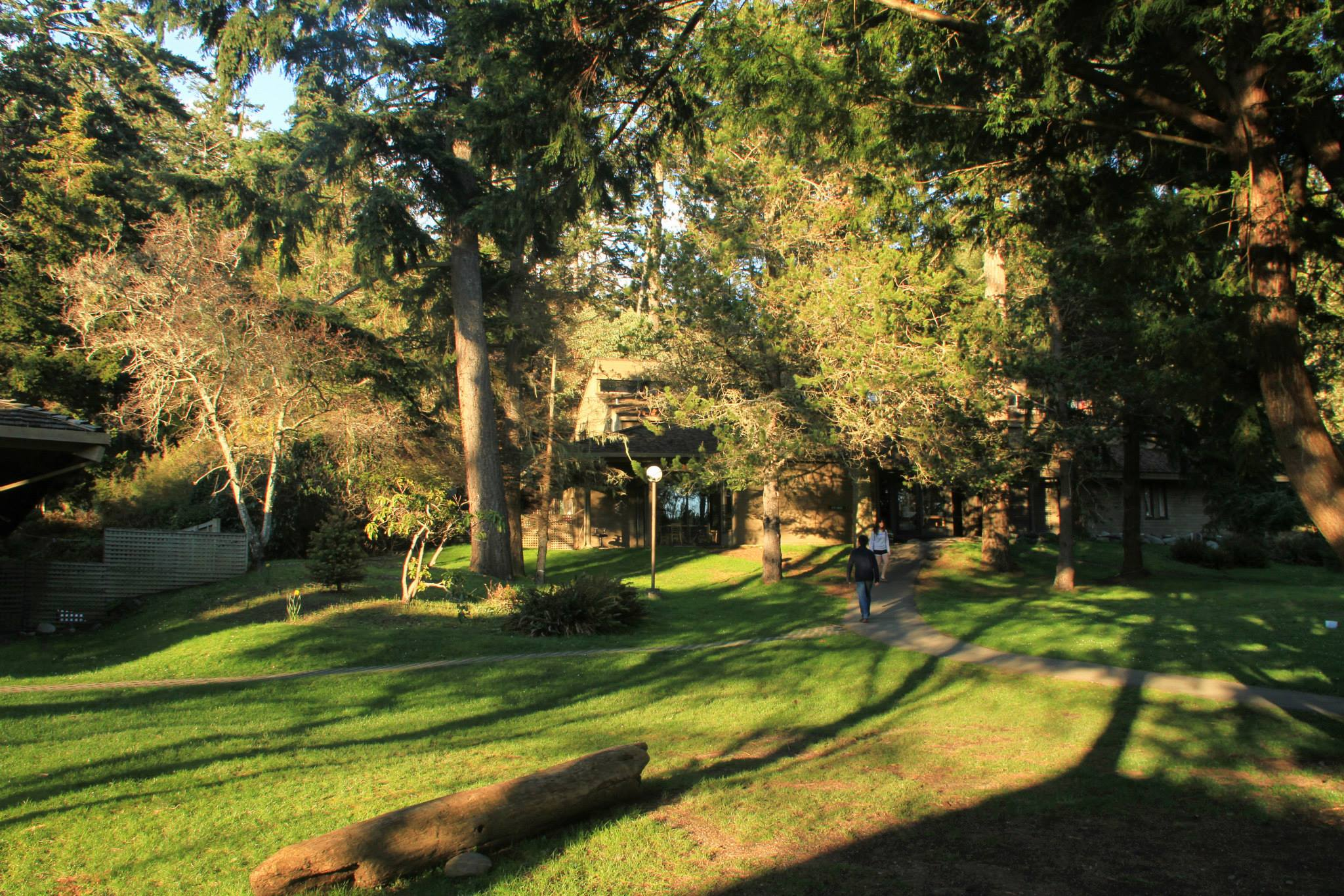
Walkway leading to QOL¸EW̱ House, one of Pearson College's residential buildings

The College's main academic curriculum follows the International Baccalaureate Diploma Programme – Pearson was the first school in Canada to adopt the IB Diploma Programme. Students are also required to participate in community-oriented services, cultural activities, and physical fitness. A highlight of the academic year is the student-driven, professional-level dance, music and cultural show, "One World", which attracts audiences from Victoria and surrounding communities.

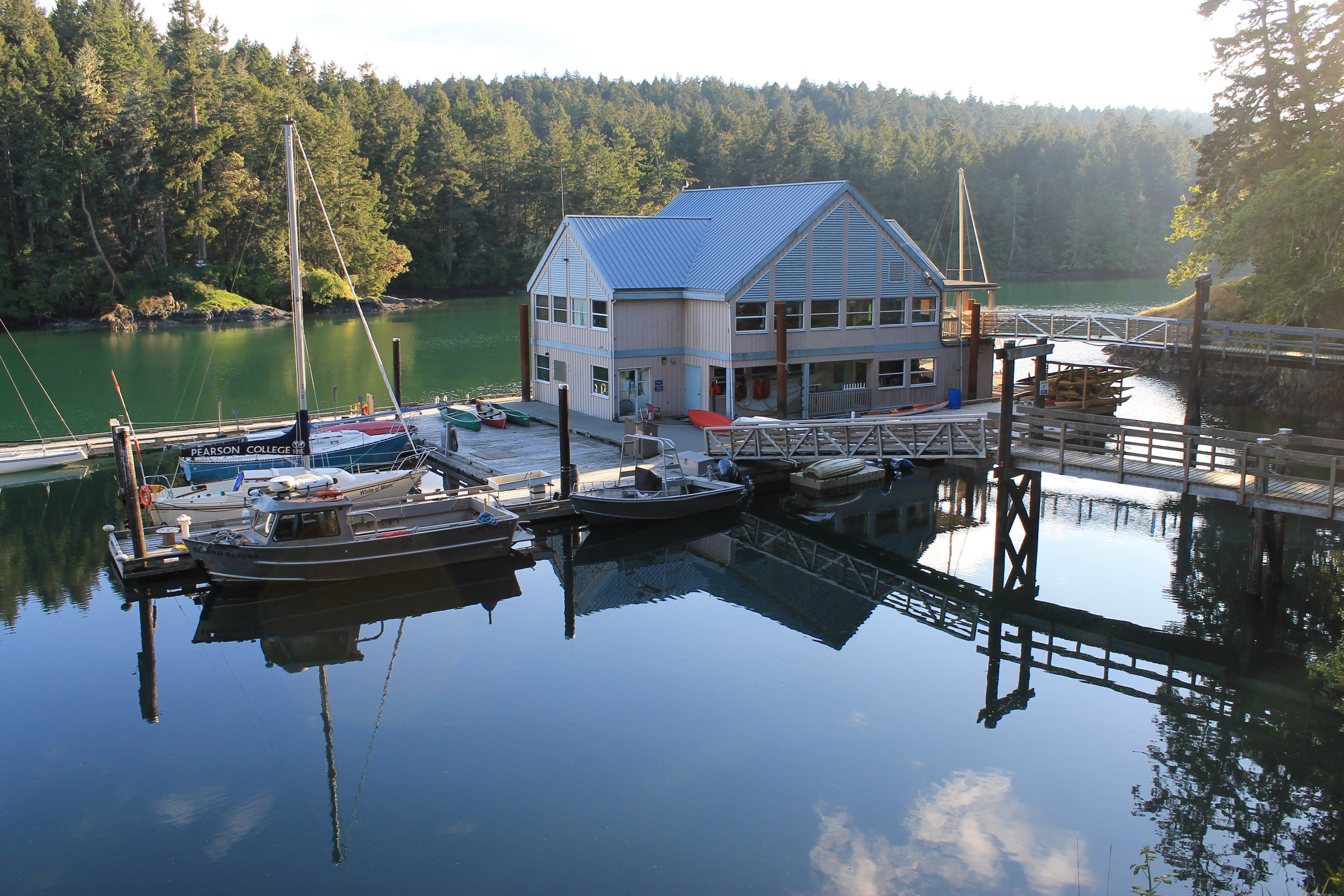
Marine Science Laboratory at Pearson College

=== Admission ===
All UWC students are selected based on merit, promise and potential. Each of the nearly 160 United World College National Committees makes recommendations for admission to UWC schools independently and according to their individual selection procedures. Admission is competitive and is deliberately intended to reflect diversity in all respects. Sponsorship to fund scholarships that help make it possible for more students to attend Pearson comes from a variety of organizations, foundations, governments and individual donors. A limited number of students are selected through the UWC Global Selections Program.

=== Administration ===
On August 1, 2023, Canadian Jason McBride was officially appointed president and head of college, having previously held leadership positions at UWC Thailand and international schools in Malaysia, Dubai, and Canada.

== Campus ==
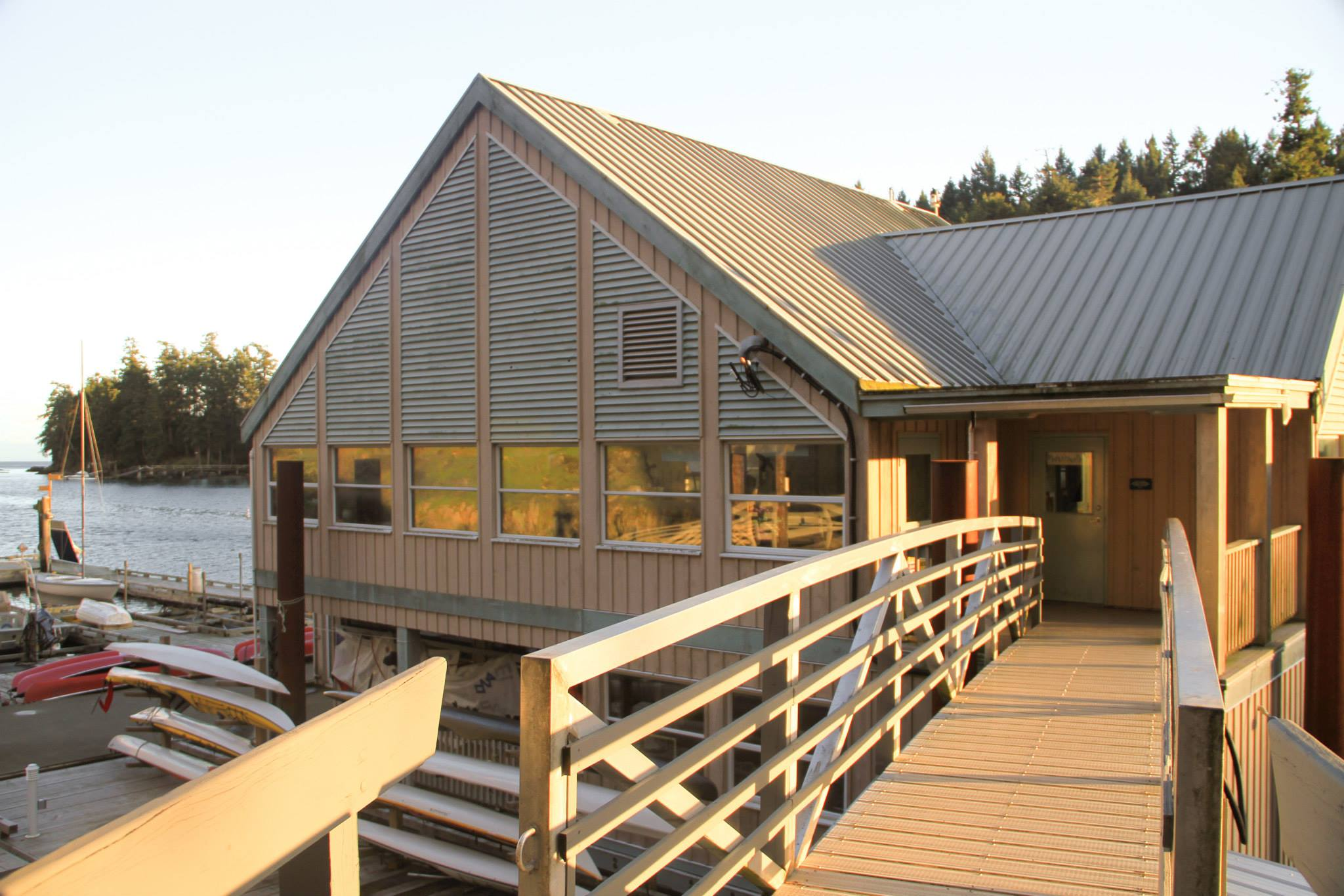
Floating Building – Pearson College UWC

The college is located on the shores of Pedder Bay, near Victoria, British Columbia on Vancouver Island, on the traditional territory of the Sc'ianew (Beecher Bay) First Nation. The college provides an excellent location for environmental studies thanks to the surrounding woodlands and the nearby Race Rocks Marine Protected Area, an ecological conservation area maintained by the college. Pearson works in partnership with BC Parks, the Canadian Coast Guard and several other committed parties to ensure a resident volunteer ecoguardian is always present on Race Rocks.

The college has five residence houses that accommodate all students in dorm rooms and, in a connected apartment, resident "houseparents." Houseparents can include some faculty and staff of the college. All student residence houses accommodate male and female students on separate floors and are equipped with a dayroom for study and relaxation. Campus facilities also include a large dining hall, an indoor swimming pool and fitness facility, a large library with study and classroom areas, a student commons building, two theatre-style seating lecture halls as well as traditional classrooms, labs and a floating marine sciences building.

The college's proximity to Pedder Bay allows a broad range of waterfront programs. A fleet of sail boats, kayaks, canoes, and scuba diving equipment is also available for supervised student use. Students can access activities only after appropriate training.

== Graduates ==
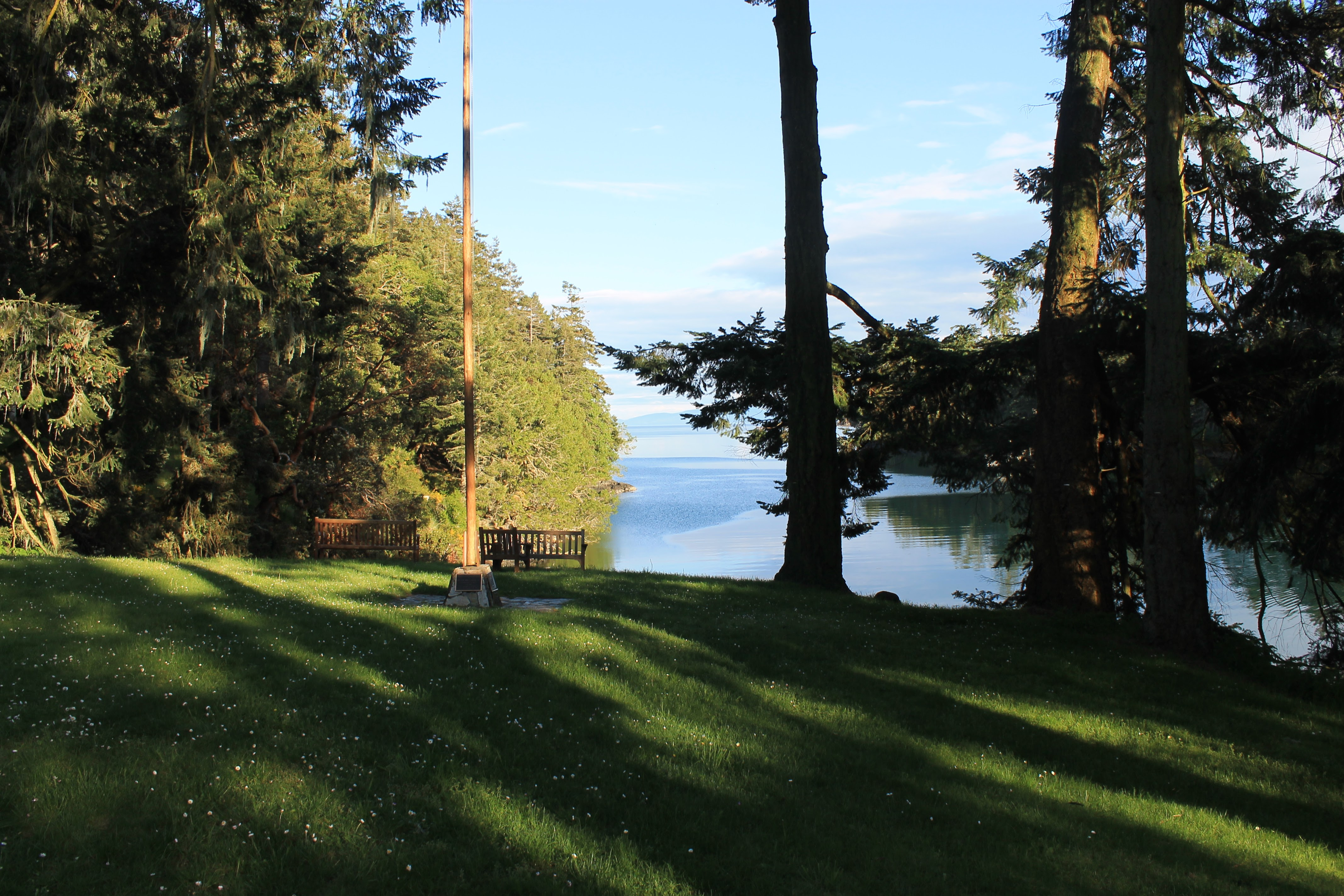
View from the Community Lawn of the college. In the distance are the Olympic Mountains.

Recent graduates have placed in some of the world's top universities, and some alumni have become notable leaders in human rights, international development, charitable organizations, business, law, science and other fields. Students from Pearson go on to study in post-secondary institutions around the world including, for example, institutions such as Brown University, Harvard University, Mount Allison University, McGill University, The University of Oxford, Columbia University, University of California (campuses incl. Berkeley, Santa Cruz, Santa Barbara, San Diego), King's College London, Sciences Po, the University of Toronto, as well as New York University.

Graduates have been awarded scholarships after leaving the college, including the Gates Cambridge Scholarship, the Knight-Hennessy Scholars program, and the Schwarzman Scholars program. 15 graduates have been awarded Rhodes Scholarships, while 17 graduating students have been selected as Loran Scholars. After graduation, alumni are eligible to participate in the Davis United World College Scholars Program, which funds undergraduate study based on need at select universities in the United States.

== Notable alumni ==
- Evan Adams, Canadian actor and Deputy Provincial Health Officer for British Columbia
- Douglas Alexander, British Member of Parliament (MP) and Shadow Foreign Secretary; from 2007 until 2010, Secretary of State for International Development in Gordon Brown's cabinet
- Wendy Alexander, Member of the Scottish Parliament and leader of the Scottish Labour Party in 2007–2008
- Marianne Alto, mayor of Victoria, BC from 2022-Present.
- Shauna Aminath, Maldives Minister of the Environment, Climate Change, and Technology
- Nicolette Bethel, Bahamian anthropologist, professor in the School of Social Sciences at the University of the Bahamas, and former director of culture in the Bahamas.
- Oluwatoyin Asojo, Nigerian scientist
- Menzie Chinn, professor of public affairs and economics at University of Wisconsin–Madison.
- Jane Clarke, poet
- Paul Colton, bishop of Cork, Cloyne and Ross
- Nicholas Dawes, executive director of The City
- Stephen Doughty (born 1980), Welsh Labour Co-op Member of Parliament for Cardiff South and Penarth
- Louise Patricia Edwards, emeritus professor of Chinese history at the University of New South Wales
- Anne Enright, 2007 Man Booker Prize-winning novelist
- Lene Espersen, former Danish minister of foreign affairs and former deputy prime minister
- Meera Gandhi, founder and chief executive officer of The Giving Back Foundation
- Massimiliano Gioni, director of exhibitions at the New Museum, curator of 55th Venice Biennale, art director of Fondazione Nicola Trussardi
- Tamar Herzog, Monroe Gutman professor of Latin American affairs at Harvard University, affiliated faculty at Harvard Law School
- Nakkiah Lui, aboriginal Australian writer and actor, New South Wales Premier's Literary Award-winning playwright, co-writer and star of Black Comedy.
- Mira Murati, former CTO and interim CEO of OpenAI
- Latif Nasser, co-host of Radiolab, and host of the Netflix series Connected
- Fionnuala Ní Aoláin, Irish academic lawyer specialising in human rights law and founder and associate director of the Transitional Justice Institute at the University of Ulster
- John Ofori-Tenkorang, Ghanaian public servant, investment banker, engineer and academic
- Jenny Ohlsson, Swedish diplomat, ambassador to Rwanda
- Todd Sampson, chief executive of Leo Burnett Australia and television personality on Gruen Planet
- Peter Sands, executive director of The Global Fund to Fight AIDS, Tuberculosis and Malaria; former CEO, Standard Chartered Bank
- Deborah Saucier, Métis Canadian neuroscientist and academic administrator
- Craig Scott, Canadian Member of Parliament (MP) and former professor of law at Osgoode Hall Law School
- Jostein Solheim, former CEO of Ben & Jerry's
- Richard Underhill, Canadian Jazz saxophonist and Juno Award winner
- Federico Varese, professor of criminology, head of Sociology Department, Oxford University
- Peter M. Willcock, justice of the British Columbia Court of Appeal
- Abiodun Williams, president of The Hague Institute for Global Justice
- Yuen Pau Woo, president and CEO of the Asia Pacific Foundation of Canada
