= United World College Changshu China =

- 常熟世界联合学院

Location
- 88 Kunchenghuxi Road; Changshu; China; 31°36′24″N 120°44′10″E

Information
- Type: International Baccalaureate World School
- Established: November 7th 2015; 10 years ago
- Founder: Mark Wang
- Oversight: United World Colleges
- Headmaster: Simon Head
- Grades: 10-12
- Gender: Mixed
- Enrolment: 650
- Language: English, Chinese
- Houses: Bari, Ikhaya, Ruka, Meraki, Baile, Hogan, Heimat, Bandele, Bayt, Efie, Ohana.
- Tuition: $55000
- Affiliation: NEASC
- Website: www.uwcchina.org

UWC Changshu China (UWCCSC; 常熟世界联合学院) is an international boarding school located in Changshu, Jiangsu, China, and the 15th member of the United World Colleges movement. It is located on an artificial island in Kuncheng Lake, and offers the IB Diploma to students from Grade 10 to 12. Founded in 2015 by Chinese businessman and UWC alum Mark Wang, it is the first UWC to be located in mainland China.

Admission to UWC Changshu is highly competitive, with an acceptance rate of approximately 7%; the school attracts top students from leading public high schools and premier international schools in mainland China. UWC is considered one of the top international high schools in mainland China.

The college has a student body of around 650 students from over 100 nationalities, about 40% of which are Chinese and many of which receive financial aid. In addition to offering the IB Diploma, it also offers student service and activity opportunities through its Zhixing Program. Students matriculate to universities around the world, often supported by the Davis UWC Scholars program. As of now, tuition at UWC Changshu is 370,000 RMB, or approximately $55,000, per year.

== History and Mission ==
UWC Changshu China was founded by Mark Wang, an alumnus of UWC Red Cross Nordic. In 2015, UWC Changshu China was opened, welcoming its inaugural cohort of students from 54 countries.

The mission of the school is aligned with the mission of the UWC movement, which is to "make education a force to unite people, nations and cultures for peace and a sustainable future."

== Campus ==
UWC Changshu China's campus is built on an artificial island in Changshu, with an area of 24 acres. Its architecture is inspired by the vernacular Chinese architecture of the region. Its facilities include a theater; track and field stadium, swimming pool, courts for basketball, soccer and volleyball; a Science, Technology, Engineering and Mathematics (STEM) center; a multi-purpose conference center; a cafeteria; a library and residences for all students and teachers.

== Educational Achievements ==
UWC Changshu China offers the Foundation Programme, a one-year educational offering in Grade 10 that prepares students for the IB Diploma Programme. In the IB Diploma Programme, students choose six subjects in various subject areas, contributing to their diploma along with studies in Theory of Knowledge, their Extended Essay, and meeting requirements in Creativity, Activity and Service. The Hurun Report ranked it the 10th best international school in China.

The class of 2025 matriculated to prestigious universities such as Princeton University, Harvard University, University of Pennsylvania, Duke University and Cornell University. Many students go on to be supported by the Davis UWC Scholars program, which provides needs-based scholarships for partner institutions in the US. Other students attend universities elsewhere, such as Oxford University in the UK.

== Community Relationship ==
The college has been instrumental to Changshu's revitalization of the Kuncheng Lake District, with the UWC+ Innovation Island promoting entrepreneurship among alumni. It has also impacted education in Changshu, opening an international kindergarten and a sister school for Chinese nationals, the China World Academy (CWA).
