= UWC ISAK Japan =

Location
- 5827-136 Nagakura; Karuizawa, Nagano Prefecture; Japan; 36°21′32″N 138°33′26″E

Information
- Type: International Baccalaureate
- Established: 2014
- Founder: Lin Kobayashi (小林りん)
- Headmaster: Arden Tyoschin
- Faculty: 29
- Grades: Pre-IB year, IB 1 & 2
- Enrollment: 175
- Language: English, Japanese, Chinese, Spanish
- Affiliation: United World Colleges
- Website: uwcisak.jp

UWC ISAK Japan (ISAK) (Japanese: ユナイテッド・ワールド・カレッジISAKジャパン), formerly the International School of Asia, Karuizawa, is a pre-university international boarding school located in Karuizawa, Japan. UWC ISAK Japan is the 17th member of the United World Colleges movement. The mission of the UWC movement and of the school is to "make education a force to unite people, nations and cultures for peace and a sustainable future". UWC ISAK Japan is accredited by Japan’s Ministry of Education (MEXT), and teaches the International Baccalaureate Diploma Program years one and two. Additionally, the school offers a pre-IB diploma year.

== High school program ==
ISAK’s aims to develop creative, open-minded young people who are curious, engaged and passionate about creating positive change. To help students develop their potential as thinkers, leaders and change-makers, the curriculum at ISAK combines rigorous academics with leadership and design thinking programs, community service and project-based learning.

ISAK offers a three-year high school program (Grades 10 – 12), with instruction in English. As an official International Baccalaureate (IB) World School, ISAK offers a curriculum in line with the IB philosophy of critical thinking that encompasses a broad range of fields, helping students learn how to connect academic knowledge to real world situations. Students in Grade 10 study a pre-IB curriculum which prepares them for the IB Diploma Programme. All Grade 11 and 12 students enroll in the IB Diploma Programme. ISAK students are also eligible to receive a diploma from the Japanese Ministry of Education. Successful completion of coursework in Grades 10-12 will enable students to receive a Japanese high school diploma.

Grade 10 Students apply from their own website at uwcisak.jp

== Student body ==
As of 2026, there are 200 students living on campus and these students represent 83 countries.

== ISAK summer school ==
Since 2010, ISAK has offered a 2-week summer school for middle school students from around the world. The summer school offers students ages 12–14 the opportunity to experience the academic culture and environment of ISAK while learning with peers from diverse socio-economic and cultural backgrounds.

== School founders ==
Lin Kobayashi (小林 りん Kobayashi Rin) Lin Kobayashi currently serves as ISAK's Chair of Board. Kobayashi's previous experience includes two years working for the United Nations Children’s Fund (UNICEF) in the Philippines, where she worked to program non-formal education projects for street children. Prior to UNICEF, Ms. Kobayashi worked at the Japan Bank for International Cooperation (JBIC). Ms. Kobayashi began her career at Morgan Stanley and holds an MA in International Education Policy Analysis from Stanford University and a BA in Development Economics from the University of Tokyo. More recently, Ms. Kobayashi was honored with the title of "Young Global Leader 2012" by the World Economic Forum, and was selected as a "Change-maker of the Year 2013" and "Nikkei Woman of the Year 2015" by Nikkei Business, one of Japan’s top business magazines. She was also awarded "Management of the Year 2016" by Zaikai, a reputable business magazine for executives. She served as a member of the Council for the Implementation of Education Rebuilding, Cabinet Secretariat, in 2015 and 2016. She is currently an advisor to the Council for Development of Teaching Profession in Nagano Prefecture.

Mamoru Taniya currently serves as an ISAK Board Member. He is the Chairman & CEO of Asuka Asset Management, Ltd. Prior to founding Asuka, Taniya was a director at Tudor Capital Japan (1999-2002) and previously a managing director at Salomon Smith Barney. Mamoru Taniya received his B.A. in law from the University of Tokyo in 1987.

== History ==
Lin Kobayashi (小林 りん Kobayashi Rin), the school's executive director, stated that ISAK would be Asian-centered.

The school's opening was originally scheduled for 2013. Despite the questions regarding foreigners leaving Japan due to the Fukushima Daiichi nuclear disaster, the school stated it was going to submit its paperwork in the month of June 2011 so construction could begin.

Kobayashi stated that the school plans to serve grades 10 through 12 and house a total of 150 students. The school's plans call for about 30-50% of the student body to receive partial and full scholarships. These scholarships would be funded by individual and corporate donors. Of the total student body, the school plans for 50% to come from Asian countries outside Japan, including developed and developing countries.

In October, 2016, the school received final approval to become a UWC (United World Colleges) school, effective August 1, 2017.

== Pandemic impact ==
Given the COVID-19 pandemic, about half of the international students from the 2021-2023 batch had to be relocated into other UWC schools. The situation arose from the Japanese government banning entry to the country. During the first months of the ban, students maintained virtual classes from all around the world, with the school administration advocating for border opening, and the founder, Lin Kobayashi, appearing on TV.

After the end of the First Term, it was decided that the situation was no longer sustainable, forcing students to walk away from the institution due to the poor circumstances. Students were offered three options: (1) transfer to another UWC, (2) withdraw from the institution or (3) defer to the following year. Almost the entirety of the incoming international 11th grade students went through the transfer option, where a majority of ISAK students transferring to UWC Thailand as their new home institution.

Just a few months after these events transpired, Japanese government relaxed its border policies, allowing the incoming international 10th grade class—who had been offered the opportunity to keep having virtual classes—to finally get to campus.
