= Mark Wang =

Chinese activist and politician

- Born: June 10, 1981 (age 45); Yinchuan, China
- Monuments: Statue at Lillesand Town Hall, Norway
- Other name: Wang Jiapeng
- Education: University of Oslo
- Occupations: Board member, China Disabled Persons’ Federation
- Known for: Disabled rights activism, author of "Hold Up The Blue Sky of Life", TV-series "Hold Up The Blue Sky of Life"

Mark Wang (Chinese: 王嘉鹏; pinyin: Wáng Jiāpéng) is a Chinese disabled rights advocate, known through television series in Norway and China and through the biographical musical Some Sunny Night written by Norwegian composer Thomas Stanghelle.

== Biography ==
Mark Wang was a passenger aboard China Northwest Airlines Flight 2119 from Yinchuan to Beijing on July 23, 1993. His spinal column was severely injured when the aircraft failed to get airborne and crashed into a lake. As a result, he was paralyzed from the waist down. Because of his injuries he was moved to Beijing Rehabilitation and Research Center (BRRC) in September 1993. At the time, BRRC and Sunnaas Hospital in Oslo, Norway had established a cooperation program, and a tour of BRRC's facilities in Beijing was included in Queen Sonja of Norway's royal visit to China. As a patron of Red Cross Nordic United World College (RCNUWC), Queen Sonja donated a scholarship to BRRC which was subsequently awarded to Mark Wang.

While a student at Red Cross Nordic United World College, Mark Wang befriended the Norwegian marathon runner and disabled rights activist Ketil Moe. Through collaborative efforts, they were able to establish the Beijing Marathon for the Disabled in 1998.

While in Norway, Mark Wang wrote an autobiography which was published with the English title "Hold Up The Blue Sky of Life" (Chinese: 撑起生命的蓝天; pinyin: Cheng qi shengming de lan tian). This autobiography became a best-seller in China, and became the basis of an 18-installment CCTV produced TV-series about his life. In the 2008 Beijing Olympics, Mark Wang was selected as a carrier in the Olympic torch relay.

In 2008, he became a member of the UWC International Council, two years later founding the UWC National Committee of China, later becoming its chair. In 2015, he founded UWC Changshu China.

He was awarded an honorary doctorate by the City University of Macau in 2024, in recognition of his significant contributions to social development and higher education.
