= Jane Clarke (poet) =

Irish poet

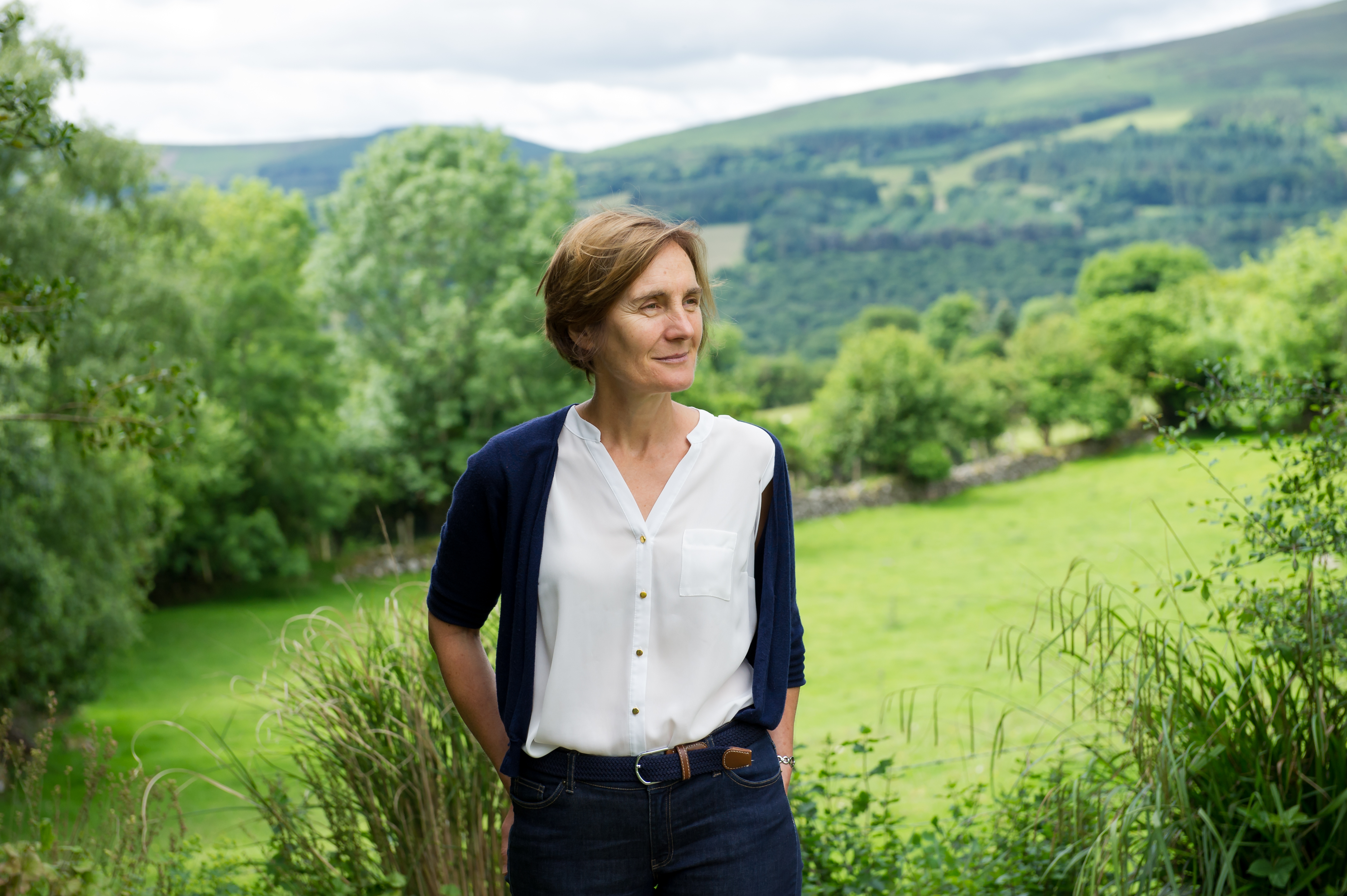
- Born: 10 February 1961 (age 65); County Roscommon, Ireland
- Education: BA (Hons), MPhil
- Occupation: Poet
- Notable work: The River, 2015; When the Tree Falls, 2019

Jane Clarke (born 10 February 1961) is an Irish poet. She is the author of three poetry collections and an illustrated poetry booklet. The Irish novelist Anne Enright has praised her poems for their "clean, hard-earned simplicity and a lovely sense of line."

== Personal life ==
Jane Clarke grew up on a farm in Fuerty, County Roscommon. She attended Fuerty National School and the Convent of Mercy, Roscommon. She won an international scholarship to the Lester B. Pearson United World College of the Pacific in Victoria, British Columbia, where she studied for an International Baccalaureate for two years. She holds an Honours BA in English and Philosophy from Trinity College Dublin and an MPhil in Writing from the University of South Wales. She also holds a diploma in action research from the University of Bath and a diploma in group analytic psychotherapy from the Institute of Group Analysis, UK.

Clarke worked in community development, adult education and psychotherapy in Dublin for thirteen years. In 1999 she and her partner Isobel O’Duffy moved to live in Glenmalure, County Wicklow. Five years later she began writing poetry and now combines writing with mentoring and creative writing tutoring.

== Writing ==
Clarke is the author of three poetry collections, The River (Bloodaxe Books, 2015) When the Tree Falls (Bloodaxe Books, 2019) and A Change in the Air (Bloodaxe Books, 2023), as well as an illustrated poetry booklet, All the Way Home, written in response to a family archive of First World War photographs and letters (Smith|Doorstop, 2019).

Much of her work is, in the words of the British poet Carol Rumens, "rooted in the landscape of the west of Ireland and the farming context in which the lives of individual humans are played out asserts its own rhythm and narrative. In honouring this larger context Clarke enlarges her poetic field with an unobtrusive but important ecopoetic dimension." She has been heralded by the Welsh poet Tony Curtis as "one of the most rewarding poets in these islands".

== Awards ==
- 2010 iYeats International Poetry Competition
- 2014 Listowel Writers’ Week Poetry Collection Prize
- 2014 Trocaire/Poetry Ireland Poetry Competition
- 2016 Hennessy Literary Award for Emerging Poetry
- 2016 Listowel Writers’ Week Irish Poem of the Year Award
- 2017 Arts Council of Ireland Literature Bursary
- 2021 Forward Book of Poetry: Highly Commended
- 2023 Forward Prize for Best Collection: shortlisted

== Publications ==
=== Poetry collections ===
- Clarke, Jane (2015). The River. Bloodaxe Books. ISBN 978-1-78037-253-2. OCLC 1162495806.
- Clarke, Jane (2019). When the tree falls. ISBN 978-1-78037-480-2. OCLC 1090281884.
- Clarke, Jane (2023). A Change in the Air. Bloodaxe Books. ISBN 978-1-78037-659-2. OCLC 1334717530.

=== Poetry booklet ===
- Clarke, Jane (2019). All the way home. Smith|Doorstop Books. ISBN 978-1-912196-68-5. OCLC 1126012827.

=== Editor ===
- McClure, Shirley; Clarke, Jane (2019). Origami Doll: new and collected poems. Syracuse University Press. ISBN 978-1-85132-210-7. OCLC 1089482228.
- "The North - 61: The Irish Issue". The Poetry Business.

=== Reviews ===
- The River
- When the Tree Falls
- All the Way Home
