= Shelby Cullom Davis =

American businessman & diplomat (1909–1994)

United States Ambassador to Switzerland
- In office July 17, 1969 – April 10, 1975
- President: Richard Nixon; Gerald Ford
- Preceded by: John S. Hayes
- Succeeded by: Peter H. Dominick

Personal details
- Born: April 1, 1909 Peoria, Illinois, U.S.
- Died: May 26, 1994 (aged 85) Hobe Sound, Florida, U.S.
- Party: Republican
- Spouse: Kathryn Wasserman Davis (1932–1994, his death)
- Children: Shelby M.C. Davis, Diana Cullom Davis Spencer, Priscilla Alden Davis
- Education: The Lawrenceville School; Princeton University; Columbia University; Graduate Institute of International Studies
- Occupation: Businessman, investor, philanthropist

Shelby Cullom Davis (April 1, 1909 – May 26, 1994) was an American businessman, investor, and philanthropist. In 1947, he founded Shelby Cullom Davis & Company, which became a leading investment firm. He later served as U.S. ambassador to Switzerland under presidents Richard Nixon and Gerald Ford.

== Early life and education ==
Davis was born April 1, 1909, in Peoria, Illinois. He attended Lawrenceville School in Lawrence Township, New Jersey, where he graduated in 1926, and matriculated to Princeton University, where he graduated in 1930. The following year, in 1931, he earned a master's degree from Columbia University. In 1934, he earned a doctorate in political science from the Graduate Institute of International Studies in Geneva. His dissertation, Reservoirs of men, a history of the black troops of French West Africa, was about military personnel in Africa.

Davis' uncle was Shelby Moore Cullom, who served in the U.S Senate for 30 years and introduced the legislation to create the Interstate Commerce Commission.

== Career ==
Davis worked as a European correspondent for CBS Radio in Geneva. In 1941, he became a member of the New York Stock Exchange. Six years later, with an investment of $100,000, he founded and headed Shelby Cullom Davis & Company, an investment firm specializing in insurance securities.

Davis joined the staff of District Attorney Thomas E. Dewey as an economist and research assistant. He advised Dewey during his presidential runs in 1940 and 1944 and was later appointed by then-New York Governor Dewey as First Deputy Superintendent of Insurance from 1944 to 1947.

=== Philanthropy ===
Davis provided significant financial support to Princeton University, funded chairs and professorships at Wellesley College, and endowed the Cullom - Davis Library at Bradley University. A Professorship of International Security Studies at Fletcher School of Law and Diplomacy was instituted in his name. He also provided support to the Library and Museum of the Performing Arts at Lincoln Center in NYC. His support of the Society of Colonial Wars is recognized in part through the Shelby Cullom Davis Lecture. In December 2013, it was announced that through his charitable fund, a $10 million donation had been made to Colby College, Waterville, Maine.

The Shelby Cullom Davis Center for Historical Studies in the Department of History at Princeton University is named after Davis.

The use of funds meant to endow the Shelby Cullom professorship at Trinity College in Hartford, Connecticut led in part to the resignation of that college's president James Jones, as well as media attention to the donor intent issue.

== Affiliations ==
Davis was chairman and treasurer of an eponymous, politically conservative think tank, the Shelby Cullom Davis Foundation, at the time of his death. He was also affiliated with The Heritage Foundation, The Mayflower Society, Sons of the Revolution, and The Society of the Cincinnati, and was an officer of The Huguenot Society of America.

== Death ==
Davis died at his home in Hobe Sound, Florida, aged 85, following a brief illness. He was survived by his wife of 62 years, Kathryn Wasserman Davis; two children: Shelby M.C. Davis and Diana D. Spencer; and eight grandchildren. His son, Shelby M.C. Davis, formed Davis Selected Advisers in 1969, and was listed as of one the 400 richest Americans in the 1980s by Forbes.

At the time of his death, Davis served as chairman of Shelby Cullom Davis & Company.

Diplomatic posts
Preceded by John S. Hayes	United States Ambassador to Switzerland and Liechtenstein; 1969–1975	Succeeded by Peter H. Dominick
