= UWC Red Cross Nordic =

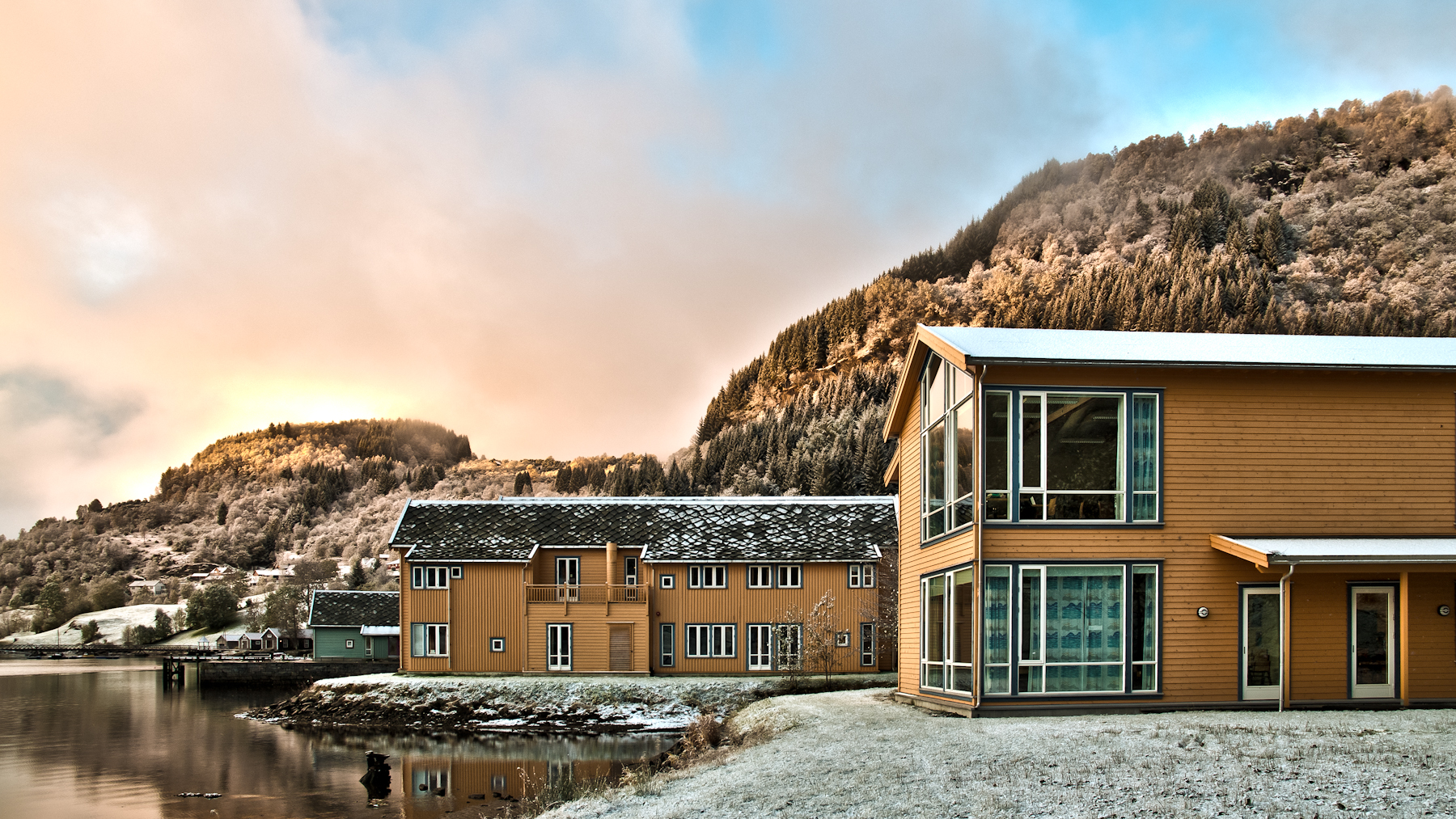
- Classroom Buildings at UWCRCN

Location
- Flekke, Fjaler Municipality, Vestland; Norway; 61°19′58″N 5°20′08″E

Information
- Type: Independent, Boarding school, International Baccalaureate
- Motto: UWC makes education a force to unite people, nations and cultures for peace and a sustainable future
- Patron saint: Queen Sonja of Norway
- Established: 1995
- Headmaster: Natasha Lambert
- Staff: 76
- Faculty: 25
- Grades: IB 1 & 2
- Gender: Coeducational
- Enrollment: 200 students
- Campus size: 300 hectare
- Campus type: Residential
- Budget: 90,372,315 NOK (2024)
- Tuition: 45,500 - 55,000 USD per year (2026)
- Affiliation: United World Colleges
- Website: https://uwcrcn.no
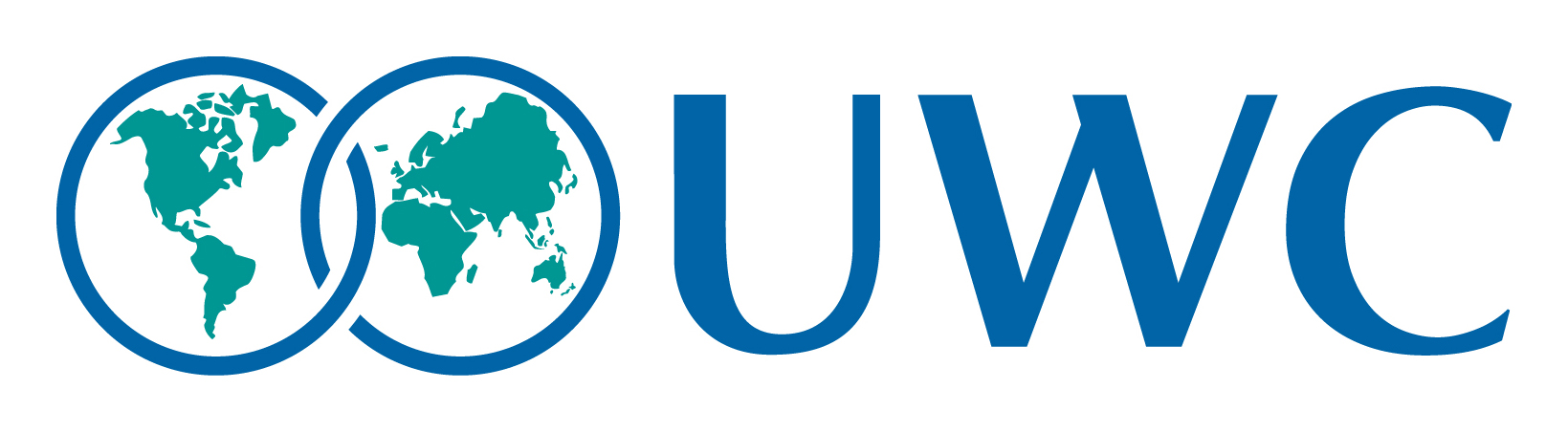

UWC Red Cross Nordic (Norwegian: UWC Røde Kors Nordisk), formerly known as Red Cross Nordic United World College, is a boarding school in Flekke which is located in Fjaler Municipality in Vestland county, Norway. Founded in 1995, it was the ninth member of the today 18 United World Colleges, being the third in Europe following Atlantic College and UWC Adriatic. Students follow the International Baccalaureate Diploma Programme.

It is attended by approximately 200 students from more than 85 countries, with special scholarships for students "from the world's most underdeveloped nations". In 2024, 97% of the student body was selected internationally through their respective National Committees, organizations that send students to the 18 UWC colleges based on their own merit-based selection procedures. Over 90% of students who apply through their National Committees received partial or full scholarships. The regular tuition fee is between 91,000 and 110,000 USD for both years with entry in 2026.

== History ==
In 1983, Ivar Lund-Mathiesen, a teacher at Atlantic College and Tom Gresvig, alumnus of said school started planning a UWC in the Nordic countries. Norway's legislation at the time did not allow for private schools, and as such they invited politician Hans Olav Tungesvik to Atlantic College while in London on a work trip with the Norwegian Parliament, who was "instantly interested". Following this meeting, the private school laws in Norway were changed following an amendment by Tom Gresvig. Subsequently, a group of stakeholders held the first meeting for the Nordic UWC Foundation (NUWC) at the Nobel institute in Oslo in 1986.

The first board consisted of politicians, CEOs, directors and public servants such as, among others: politician Hans Olav Tungesvik, Nobel Institute director Jacob Sverdrup, CEO of Freia Knut Hjortdal, former Secretary of State Karin Stoltenberg and ministers Helge Seip and Sven Stray.

By 1987, 23 municipalities in Sogn og Fjordane had applied to be the host municipality for the college. The possibilities were advertised as bringing 40-50 direct jobs, and alumni serving as international ambassadors once graduated drawing international attention to the region. Some municipalities spent a six-figure sum (NOK) on advertisement campaigns to get the college built on their ground. The largest labor union in Norway, Norwegian Confederation of Trade Unions, was formally against the formation of the college and tried to change the private school laws again, saying its ideas represent "everything evil" with the Norwegian schooling system.

The choice of location came to be in 1988 after a year of consideration, choosing Fjaler, partly because of the land and surrounding nature. Christian Bekker, who owned the land on which the college is now built, died in 1980. In his will he gave the land to the Norwegian Red Cross, on the condition that it shall be used for "humanitarian and inspiring causes". When the Nordic UWC Foundation learnt of this, they proposed UWC and the Red Cross become a joint venture to utilize the land. The joint venture enabled the government to grant the college an exception and established its legal eligibility for funding, on the basis of the amendment drafted by the college’s own Gresvig in 1985. However, even after entering the joint venture, the school struggled to get funding approved in the early 1990s. Following a visit from representatives from the Nordic countries in 1988, Danish minister Erik Ib Schmidt expressed doubts about the feasibility of an international college in such a rural location, being quoted as saying "But how does one get the funding to build a college? By magic?".

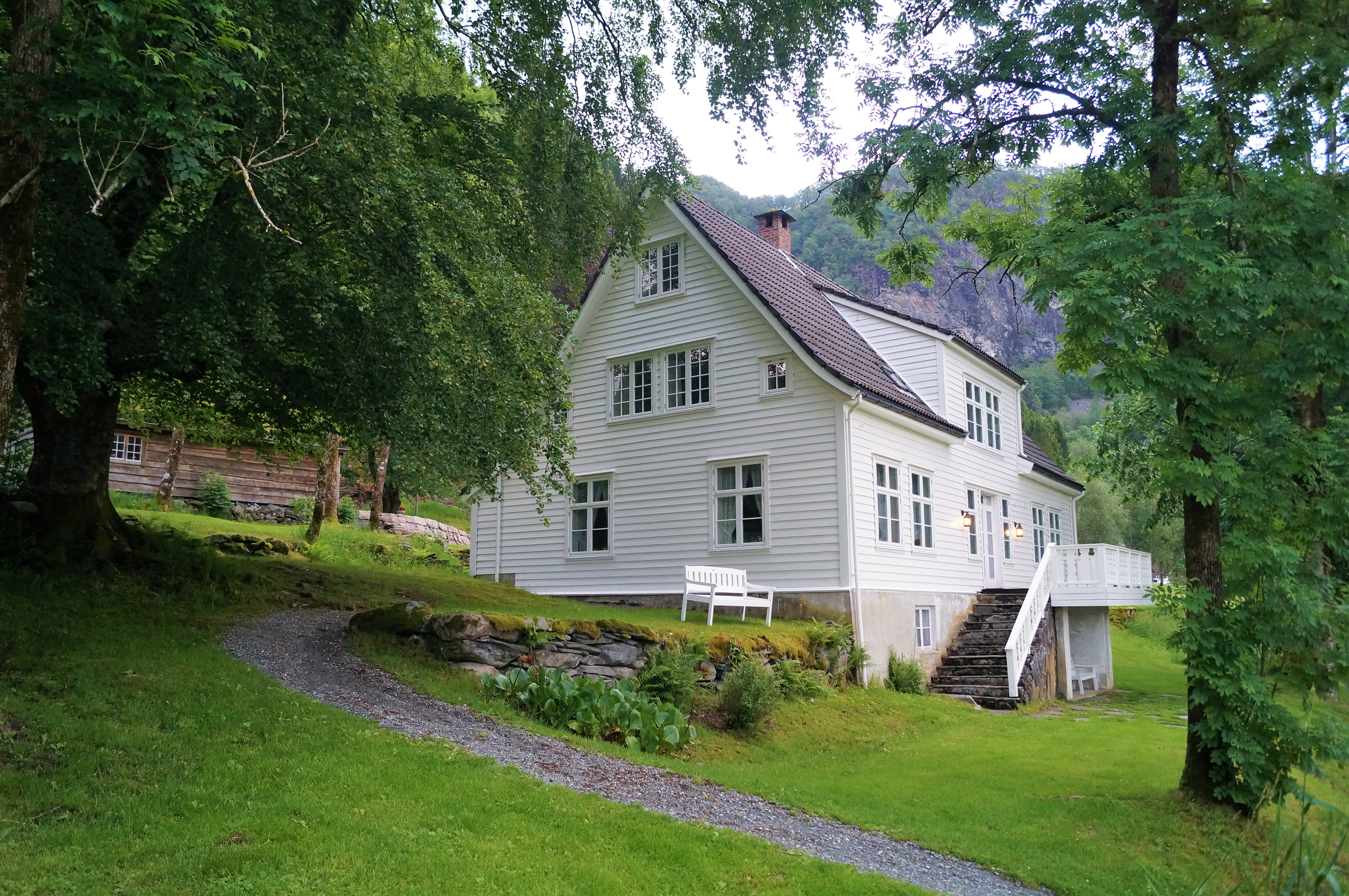
The restored house of Christian Bekker on the property

In the following time, extensive lobbying of the Nordic government to secure funding took place, which included H.M. Queen Sonja of Norway personally talking with the Danish minister of education at the time, having to accept Finland being unable to support the college due to its failing economy following the collapse of the Soviet Union, and prime minister of Norway Gro Harlem Brundtland personally vouching for the project to her Nordic counterparts. The chair of the Nordic UWC Foundation, Ivar Lund-Mathiesen described the situation as "At times it felt like a Sysiphus project". In an attempt to gather political support, the then Prince of Wales, King Charles III was supposed to visit the site to promote the project, but was unable to travel due to breaking his arm while playing polo. Subsequently, H.M. Queen Sonja of Norway undertook the trip on his behalf in 1990. Nonetheless, the final grant was approved in May 1993. The first stage of the college was built in only 13 months with Statsbygg as the chosen developer, Arkitektgruppen CUBUS as architect, at a cost of 33 million NOK, not including the costs of the adjacent Red Cross Rehabilitation Center or any later additions. The total cost of the college was 100 million NOK.

In 1992, the Red Cross Rehabilitation Center, whom the college now shares facilities with, was completed and opened by King Harald V. In 1995, UWC Red Cross Nordic enrolled its first cohort of 104 students from 65 countries, officially opened by H.M. Queen Sonja of Norway, Queen Noor of Jordan and adventurer Thor Heyerdahl, with personal greetings from Nelson Mandela relayed by the ambassador on September 30, 1995.

As a consequence of its unique funding history and structure, the college's budget is determined by its own line in the Norwegian government budget such that it is unaffected by general changes to the funding of private schools, called "Tilskott til Røde Kors Nordisk United World College".

H.M. Queen Sonja of Norway remains the Patron of the college to this day, having visited 12 times. Queen Noor of Jordan has been president of the United World Colleges movement since 1995, with prior presidents being Louis Mountbatten, 1st Earl Mountbatten of Burma, King Charles III and Nelson Mandela. In 2022, 2023, and 2024, the movement was nominated to the Nobel prize by Norwegian politician Alfred Bjørlo, who also publicly advocated for a 3,4 million NOK increase in government funding for the college in 2023, with the final allocation finalized at 5 million NOK. The college is visited by the Nordic ambassadors to Norway as the funding countries.

== College ==
The college enrolls 200 students aged 16 to 20 from more than 85 different nations, including teenagers from SOS Children's Villages and refugees through its "Survivors of Conflict" programme. Under the UWC motto "UWC makes education a force to unite people, nations and cultures for peace and a sustainable future", UWC Red Cross Nordic differs from the other schools in also focusing on its three pillars: humanitarian, environmental and nordic, to be in line with the conditions of Christian Bekker's will. Compared to other UWC schools, that have strict curfews, UWC Red Cross Nordic has a lenient approach inspired by Nordic culture, where students only have to follow a "quiet-time" at 22:30.

=== Academics ===
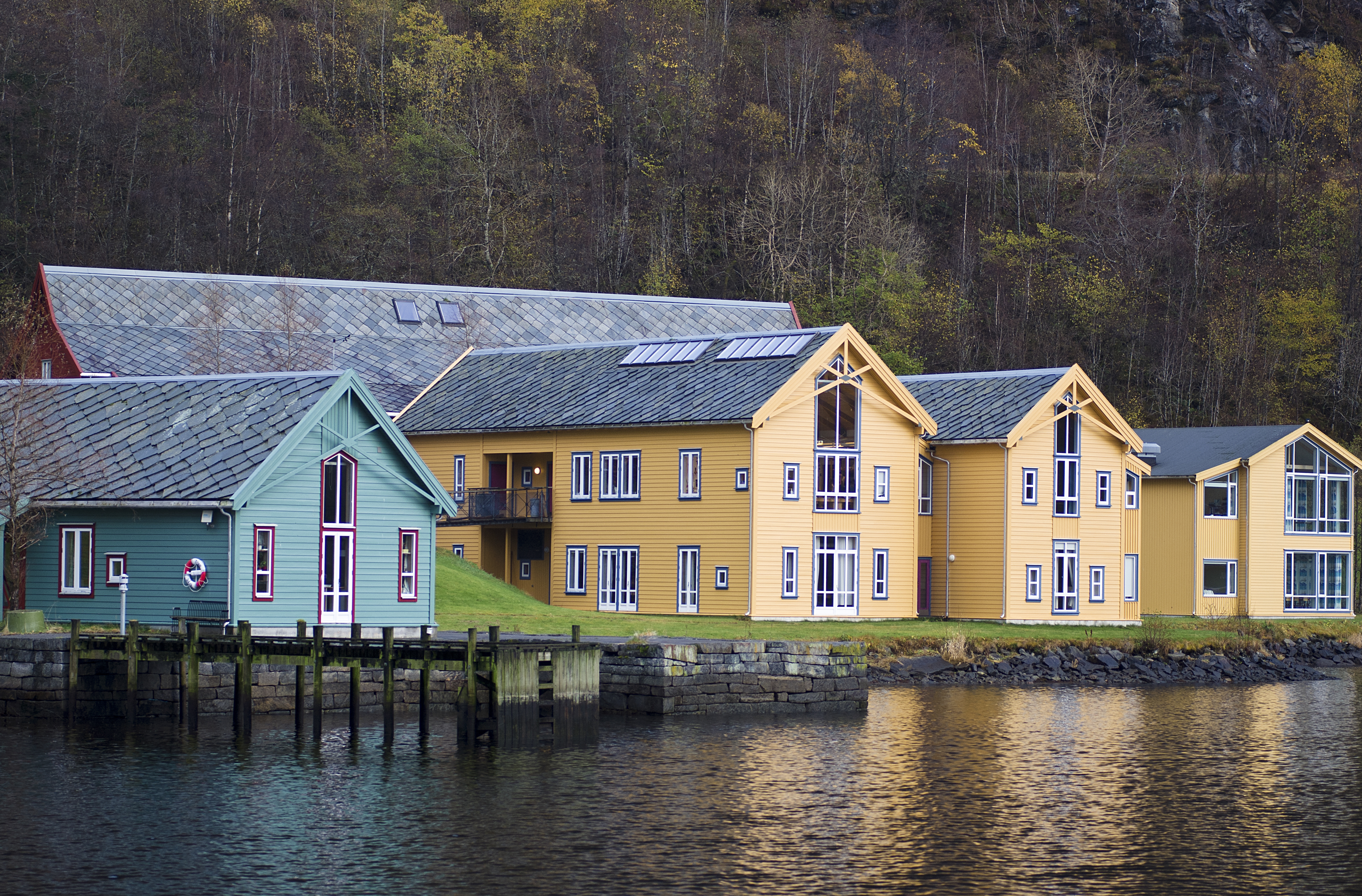
Academic buildings

Students at UWC Red Cross Nordic follows the International Baccalaureate Diploma Programme, being one of 33 schools in Norway to do so. It does not offer any pre-diploma programmes. Its students consistently perform well academically, scoring between 3 and 4 points better than the average IBDP student globally. The school facilitates participation in national and international competitions, and students have won the national mathematics olympiad Abelkonkurransen as well as physics olympiad.

Many of its graduates go on to study in the United States, funded by the UWC Davis Scholarship. Through this scholarship, students from less fortunate backgrounds are able to continue onto higher education, often becoming the first in their family to do so. Graduates from the college are highly desired due to their international and multicultural understanding, and 20 to 30 college representatives from the US visit the college every year to recruit its students.

Subjects offered at the college vary every year depending on teacher availability. Among others, a "fast track Norwegian course for beginners" is offered every year as Norwegian B SL depending on demand. Students may follow self taught online classes in their native language with college support.

=== Sports ===
The college offers a wide range of sports and activities as part of the CAS component of the IB Diploma. The college has its own canoes, kayaks, ice skates, climbing equipment, diving equipment and more. Students are able to utilize the five-a-side football pitch as well as the gym and pool complex (both shared with Red Cross Rehabilitation Center). In addition, the school rents access to a dance studio, full size football pitch and volleyball field in the nearby village, Dale i Sunnfjord.

Students have access to a wide range of fjord related activities. They can undergo separate two-day courses in canoeing and kayaking, in order to be licensed to take other students on such trips without supervision. In addition to owning sailboats and teaching students basics of sailing, the college also has its own boat building programme, where students in cooperation with local experts, restore old wooden sailboats using traditional Norwegian methods.

All first year students must participate in "friluftsveka" during winter. Here, they spend a week in the Norwegian mountains, engaging in a range of activities such as cross-country skiing, sleeping outside and engaging in the concept of friluftsliv. For many students, their time at the college is their first time seeing snow, and this their first time skiing.

Moreover, the college also supports students engaging in top sports, allowing for absences and in some cases organizing transport to competitions at the local, district and national level.

=== Humanitarian ===
Through its close cooperation with the Red Cross, its students volunteer at local camps for refugees and asylum seekers, visits to elderly homes, para football activities and more. This is also a part of their CAS programme in the IB diploma. The local Red Cross Youth organization is located at the college.

=== Other activities ===
The college raises political awareness through presentations held by external guest speakers and students on political issues which are open to the whole college and the surrounding community. Through UWC Connect, camps for school children from the all across the country are organized during spring and autumn. This is organized through the college Leirskule (Camp School) program which is led by staff with the additional support of EVS volunteers. TEDxUWCRCN is a yearly event since 2015, where a group of students invite a mix of speakers from a local, national and international level to hold speeches on a predetermined topic.

=== Residential living ===
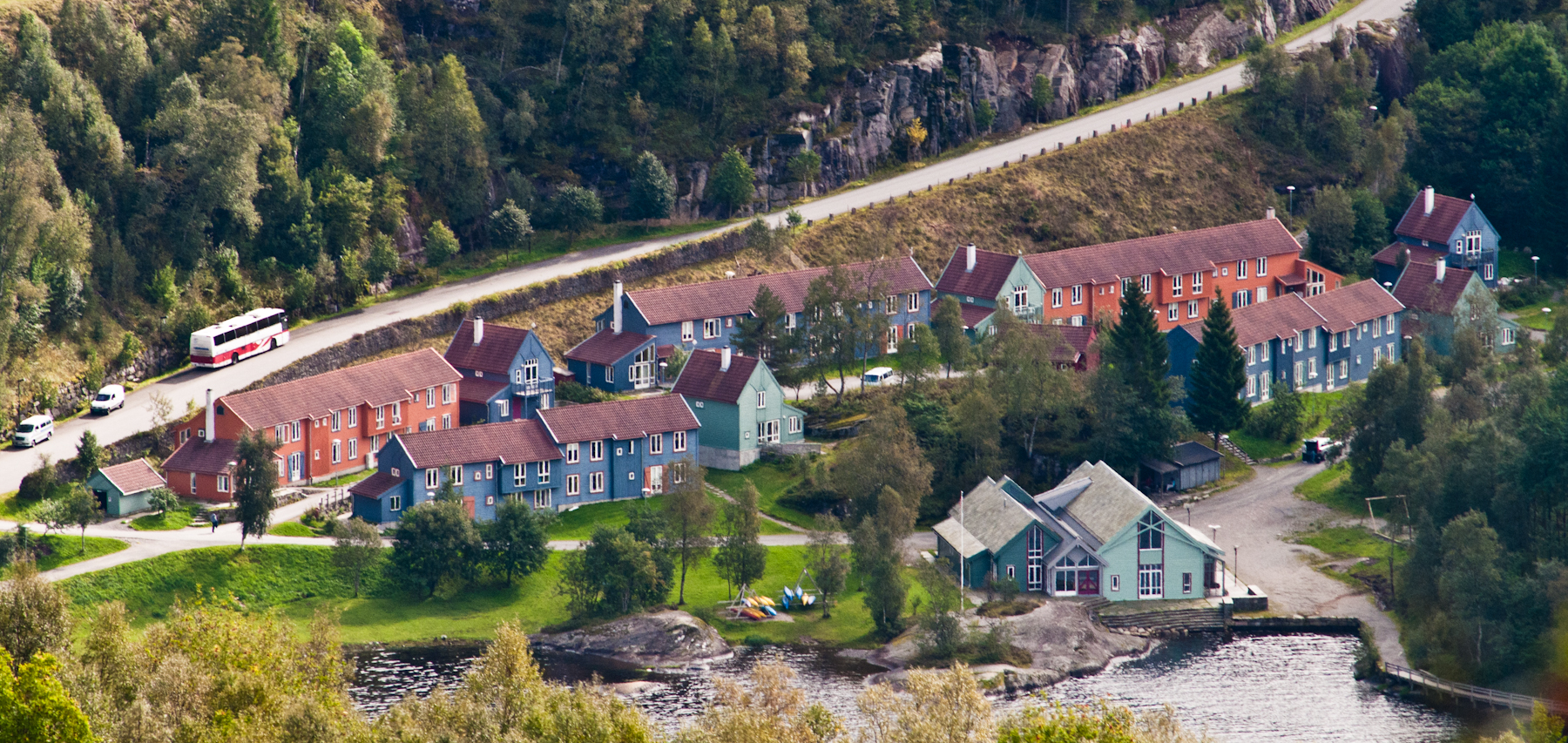
Student dormitories, 2009

Students at the college are split into five houses: Norway House, Sweden House, Denmark House, Iceland House and Finland House. Each house consists of eight rooms with its own bathroom and forty students. Every house has its own "day room" or living room with basic kitchen appliances and a House Leader who lives in a separate house next to the student house. Together with four dedicated advisors, this makes up the primary support team for students in case of issues. In order to maximize intercultural sharing, the students in each room are picked to be as diverse as possible.

The college regularly offers inter-house sports competitions to build a house identity and pride.

=== Facilities and buildings ===
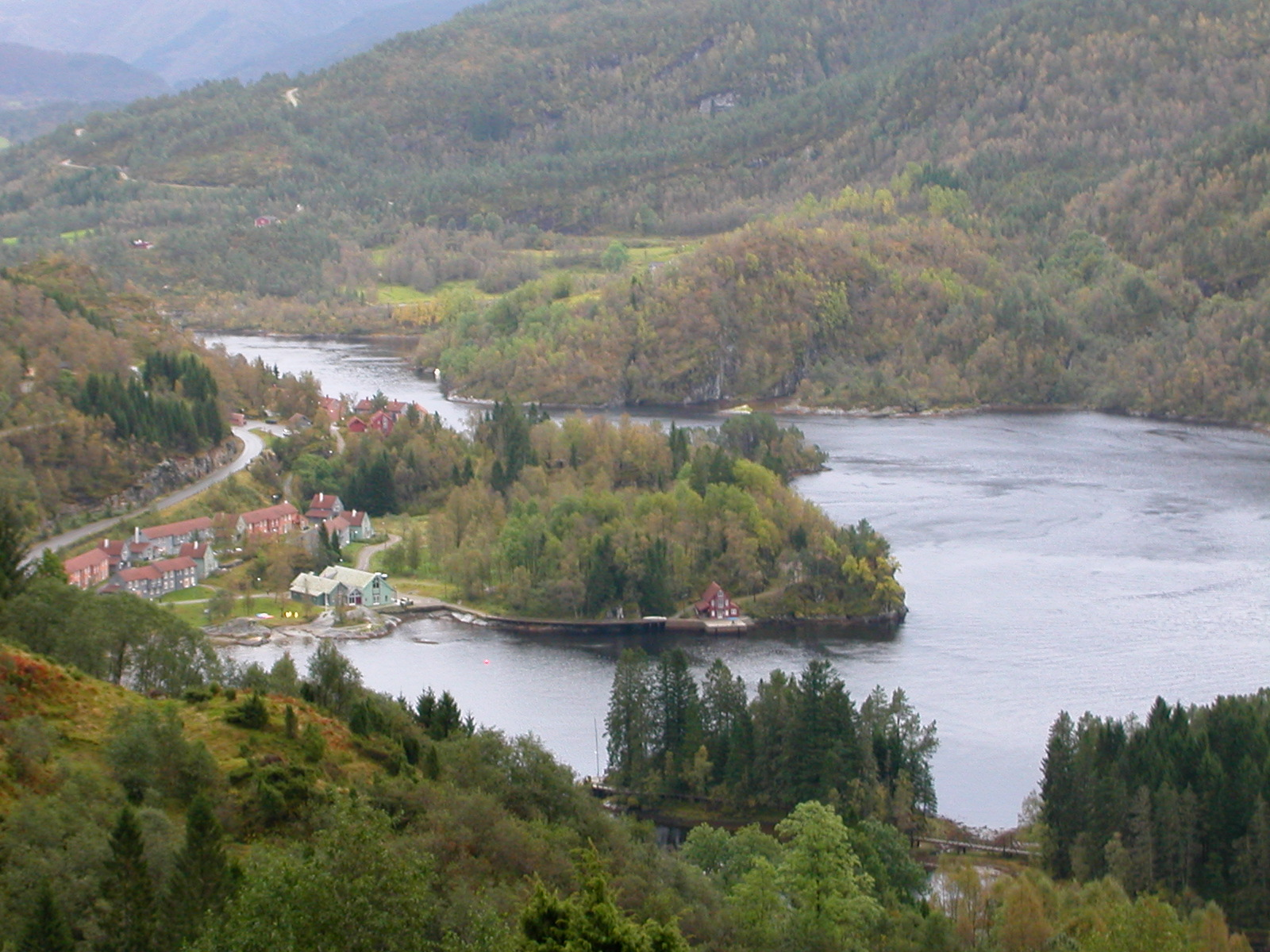
The college seen from the north

Below is a non-exhaustive list of the buildings and facilities on campus for students:

- Five student dormitories
- Kantina (includes auditorium, library and bouldering room)
- Administrative building (includes nurses office and university office)
- Andresen educational building
- Eckbo educational building
- K-building
- Leif Høegh center
- Boat-building shed
- Kayak and canoe house (includes a music room)
- Baking house
- Silent house for meditation and prayer
- Five-a-side football field
- Shooting range for bow and arrow
- Two UWC Connect buildings
- A lavvo for community gatherings

The following are shared facilities with Red Cross Rehabilitation Center:

- Pool complex (consisting of two pools, saunas, and a water slide)
- Gym
- Island connected by bridge
- Multiple boat docks

== Partnerships ==
The college collaborates and interacts with a large number of organizations and institutions on a district- and national level.

=== Røde Kors Haugland Rehabiliteringssenter ===
Red Cross Rehabilitation Center (RKHR) is the closest neighbour of the college, and envisioned as a partnering institution from the beginning, they share knowledge, facilities and staff with the college. Specializing in the rehabilitation of stroke victims, cancer patients, skeletal diseases such as Olliers disease, Parkinsons disease etc. they actively use the surrounding nature as well. Throughout the academic year, students actively participate in activities with patients at the center. In 2007, the center started the Haugland International Research- og Development center (HIFUS AS) in collaboration with the college and Fjaler kommune for research and development for the patients at RKHR.

=== Red Cross ===
Bearing its name, the Red Cross is the college's closest institutional partner. Having one permanent seat on the board and occupying one of three deputy positions, it is the only organization besides other UWC bodies directly involved in the long term strategy of the college. They are also a direct stakeholder in the college as the owner of the land on which it is built. The local youth office of the Red Cross is located at the college. Every year, a multitude of courses, workshops and events take place in collaboration with the Red Cross. Among others, every student undergoes a three day first aid course in addition to the Red Cross Volunteer Course. Students can also elect to take further courses such as the Treffpunkt Red Cross course, as well as a continuous first aid education throughout their time at the college. A select group of students attend the yearly general assembly of the Norwegian Red Cross.

=== Nobel Institute ===
The Norwegian Nobel Institute has played an important role in the establishment and later maintenance of the school. Its director, being a member of the first board, played an active role in lobbying for governmental grants to fund the construction of the school, as well as the required political support nationally and internationally. Since 1995, the college has sent 5 students to the Nobel Peace Prize ceremony in Oslo every year. Its students have in recent years also held exclusive interviews with the laureates, most recently in 2024, when student Kenta Gomi interviewed the representatives of Nihon Hidankyo. In 2024 the college also co-hosted the Nobel Peace Festival in Oslo together with the institute.

=== Norec ===
Norec, a governmental body facilitating personnel and knowledge exchange between Norway and the global South, is a close partner of the college. Prior to 2018, its main office was in Oslo, when a governmental directive was issued to move it away from the capital as a decentralization initiative. While the initial candidates were the major cities Bergen, Stavanger and Trondheim, it was ultimately relocated to Førde, the nearest city to the college. Førde's proximity to the college was directly cited as the reason for the surprising move, due to the expertise and knowledge in multicultural affairs that the college contributes to the surrounding area. Since 2018, Norec has regularly sent its employees to the college for workshops, and employees from Norec also regularly contribute to events at the college.

=== Utøya ===
Recently, all of the college's second year students go on a yearly field trip to Utøya, aimed at educating the students on the importance of resilience and of fostering an inclusive society. The site of Norway's deadliest terrorist attack and later a range of memorials, the trip is centered around the UWC values with students partaking in many non-academic workshops.

== Principals ==
- 1995: Tony Macoun
- 2000: Erkki Letho
- 2002: Dr John Lawrenson
- 2012: Richard Lamont
- 2018: Guðmundur Hegner Jónsson
- 2019: Jo Loiterton (interim)
- 2020: Hege Myhre
- 2022: Pelham Lindfield Roberts
- 2025: Natasha Lambert

== Notable alumni ==
- Alexander Willen, professor and economist
- Anna Kwok, activist
- Ben Hopkins, historian and author
- David Moinina Sengeh, politician
- Fanny Ketter, actor
- Ingilín D. Strøm, former Faroese Minister of Environment
- Jacob Bredesen, politician
- Józef Lewandowski, chemist
- Mark Wang, activist for disabled rights
- Martin Hillebrandt, professor and jurist
- Magnea Gná Jóhannsdóttir, politician
- Mette Karlsvik, writer
- Peter Grouv, executive
- Stella Christie, Indonesian minister of higher education
- Sunniva Roligheten, author
- Tecber Ahmed Saleh, activist
- Tommy Leung, executive
- Wille Valve, politician
