= Shelby M. C. Davis =

American philanthropist (born 1937)

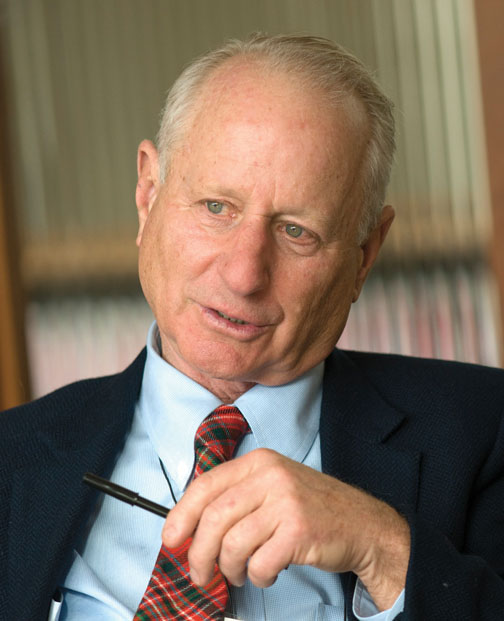
- Davis in 2008
- Born: Shelby Moore Cullom Davis; 1937 (age 88–89)
- Occupations: Businessman, investor, philanthropist
- Spouse: Gale Davis
- Parent(s): Shelby Cullom Davis (father); Kathryn Wasserman Davis (mother)

Shelby Moore Cullom Davis (born 1937) is an American philanthropist and retired investor and money manager.

== Early life and career ==
Born 1937, Davis is the son of money manager Shelby Cullom Davis and Kathryn Wasserman Davis. He is a graduate of Princeton University and began his career at The Bank of New York, where he became the bank's youngest vice president since Alexander Hamilton.

Davis left BNY in 1968 to found an investment management firm that eventually became Davis Selected Advisers, which as of 2021 manages about $37 billion in several funds.

All the Davis funds invest in public equities and have been described as "value stock" funds. Shelby Davis's reputation with such stocks was such that he was called a "legendary fund manager" by the New York Times, a "legend" by Money magazine, "legendary" by Financial Advisor magazine, and a "legendary investor" by Kiplinger's Personal Finance magazine.

Davis is currently married to his second wife, Gale. His first wife, Wendy A. Adams, was the daughter of Boston Bruins Chairman Weston Adams. Davis served for a time as Vice President of the Bruins, and as a result of the team's championship win in 1972, his name is engraved on the Stanley Cup.

In 2012, John Rothchild published a profile of Davis, his father, and his sons, called "The Davis Dynasty: Fifty Years of Successful Investing on Wall Street".

== Philanthropy ==
Shelby Davis is a philanthropist who has donated primarily to educational causes. Among the largest recipients of his donations are the United World College movement and his own alma mater, Princeton University, of which he served as trustee starting in 2006, and was among the university's largest donors during his time on the board. His backing of the United World Colleges included his paying for the restoration of the Montezuma Castle on the U.S. campus. He has further supported these schools through the Davis United World College Scholars Program, the Davis-UWC IMPACT Challenge and the Davis-UWC Dare to Dream Program. Through the Davis United World College Scholars Program, Davis has provided scholarships for over 10,000 students at colleges and universities around the world.

Davis and his wife also support environmental and regional charities, including in Maine, Wyoming, Florida, and Utah.

Davis explained his philanthropic efforts by saying "I believe education creates possibilities. It's always about young people and their futures, and we all realize that with education, young people have more possibilities than without it. I am investing in UWC students, in particular, because I believe they are getting a special brand of education at UWC schools. They tell me this, over and over in their letters and when I meet them. Their teachers and professors tell me this, too".

== Works cited ==
- Rothchild, John (2003). The Davis Dynasty: Fifty Years of Successful Investing on Wall Street. John Wiley & Sons. ISBN 978-0-471-47441-8.
