= United World Colleges =

Education movement

UWC (United World Colleges)
- Motto: "A global movement making education a force to unite people, nations and cultures for peace and a sustainable future."
- Type: Schools, colleges, and short educational programmes
- Established: 1962; 64 years ago
- Founder: Kurt Hahn
- President: Queen Noor of Jordan
- Executive Director: Faith Abiodun
- Location: Colleges in 18 countries UWC International Office, London and Berlin
- Website: uwc.org

The United World Colleges (UWC) is an international network of schools and colleges providing the International Baccalaureate. The organisation was founded on the principles of German educator Kurt Hahn in 1962 to promote intercultural understanding.

Today, UWC consists of 18 colleges on four continents. Young people from more than 155 countries are selected through a system of national committees and pursue the International Baccalaureate Diploma; some of the schools are also open to younger years. Financial support is provided to approximately 80% of students selected through the UWC national committee system. To date, there are over 85,000 UWC alumni from all over the world.

The current President of UWC is Queen Noor of Jordan (1995–present). Former South African President Nelson Mandela was joint-President (1995–1999), alongside Queen Noor, and, subsequently, Honorary President of UWC (1999–2013). Former UWC presidents are Louis Mountbatten, 1st Earl Mountbatten of Burma (1968–1977) and, when he was Prince of Wales, King Charles III (1978–1995).

The movement, including the colleges and national committees, are linked and coordinated by UWC International, which consists of the UWC International Board, the UWC International Council, and the UWC International Office (UWCIO), based in London and Berlin. These entities work together to set the global strategy for the movement, oversee fundraising, and approve new colleges. Faith Abiodun, who joined the movement in 2021, serves as executive director of the International Office, and Musimbi Kanyoro has been the chair of the International Board since 2019.

== History ==
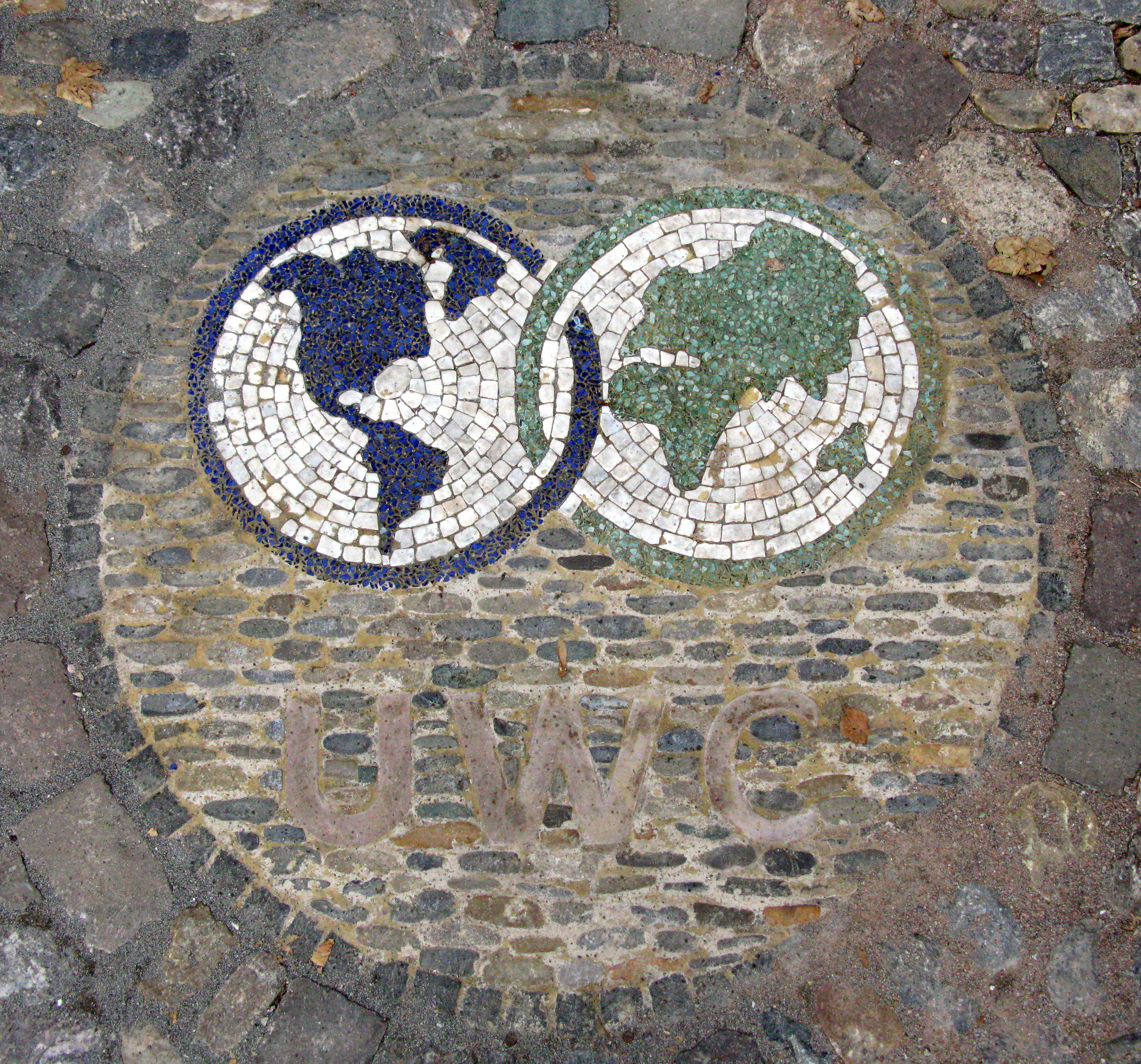
The UWC emblem at UWC Robert Bosch in Freiburg, Germany

UWC was originally founded in the early 1960s to bridge the social, national and cultural divides apparent during the Second World War, and exacerbated by the Cold War. The first college in the movement, UWC Atlantic College in Wales, United Kingdom, was founded in 1962 by Kurt Hahn, a German educator who had previously founded Schule Schloss Salem in Germany, Gordonstoun in Scotland, the Outward Bound movement, and the Duke of Edinburgh's Award Scheme.

Hahn envisaged a college educating young people, aged 16 to 19. He believed that schools should not simply be a means for preparing to enter university, but should help students prepare for life by developing resilience and the ability to experience both successes and failures. The selection would be based on personal motivation and potential, regardless of any social, economic or cultural factors. A scholarship programme would facilitate the recruitment of young people from different socio-economic backgrounds.

Louis Mountbatten was involved with Atlantic College from its early days, and encouraged the organisation to adopt the name United World Colleges and to open an international office with operations distinct from that of Atlantic College, to indicate a global reach and ambition beyond a single college. In 1967, he became the first president of United World Colleges, a position he held until 1977. Together with the first Deputy Headmaster of Atlantic College Robert Blackburn (educationalist), Lord Mountbatten supported the organization by gaining support from heads of state and politicians and in fundraising activities. Under his presidency, the United World College of South East Asia was established in Singapore in 1971 (formally joining the UWC movement in 1975), followed by the United World College of the Pacific in Victoria, British Columbia, in 1974.

During the tenure of Prince Charles (now King Charles III) as president, he supervised the rapid growth of the movement, until it encompassed nine schools around the globe.

== The Colleges ==
The United World Colleges, superimposed on the UWC emblem

There are currently 18 UWC schools and colleges in operation, with an international office in London and Berlin. UWC Simón Bolivar was a member of the movement until its closing in 2012 by the Venezuelan government.

The location and opening date (and, for those that joined the UWC movement after being founded as an independent institution, their joining year) for each United World College is given below:

- UWC Atlantic (Llantwit Major, Wales, United Kingdom), 1962
- Pearson College UWC (Victoria, British Columbia, Canada), 1974
- UWC South East Asia (Singapore), two campuses: one founded 1971, joined UWC 1975, and another built in 2008
- Waterford Kamhlaba United World College of Southern Africa (Mbabane, Eswatini), founded 1963, joined UWC 1981
- UWC-USA (Montezuma, New Mexico, United States), 1982
- UWC Adriatic (Duino, Italy), 1982
- Li Po Chun United World College (Wu Kai Sha, Hong Kong), 1992
- UWC Red Cross Nordic (Flekke, Norway), 1995
- UWC Mahindra College (Pune, India), 1997
- UWC Costa Rica (Santa Ana, Costa Rica; new campus opening 2027: San Isidro, Costa Rica), founded 2000, joined UWC 2006
- UWC Mostar (Mostar, Bosnia and Herzegovina), 2006
- UWC Maastricht (Maastricht, Netherlands), founded 1984, joined UWC 2009
- UWC Robert Bosch (Freiburg, Germany), 2014
- UWC Dilijan (Dilijan, Armenia), 2014
- UWC Changshu China (Changshu, China), 2015
- UWC Thailand (Phuket, Thailand), founded 2008, joined UWC 2016
- UWC ISAK Japan (Karuizawa, Japan), founded 2014, joined UWC 2017
- UWC East Africa (Moshi and Arusha, Tanzania), founded 1969, joined UWC 2019

== Academics ==
UWC values experiential learning alongside providing its 16–19-year-old students with the International Baccalaureate (IB) Diploma, an internationally recognised pre-university educational programme developed in close collaboration with UWC in the late 1960s. The IB Diploma Programme was co-developed in 1968 by the United World College of the Atlantic, the International School of Geneva (Ecolint), and the United Nations School in New York City (UNIS), and aims "to develop students who have excellent breadth and depth of knowledge – students who flourish physically, intellectually, emotionally and ethically". Today, UWC and the IB Organisation continue to work closely together to develop new curricular and shaping international education, including developing and teaching school-based syllabi, and launching a new "systems transformation pathway."

Five UWC schools (UWC Thailand, UWC South East Asia in Singapore, UWC Maastricht in the Netherlands, UWC East Africa in Tanzania, and Waterford Kamhlaba UWC of Southern Africa in Eswatini) also offer non-residential educational programmes for younger students aged between 18 months and 15 years.

Meanwhile, some UWC schools and colleges offer a Pre-IB Year as a preparation year for students before they begin their IB Diploma Programme. UWC schools and colleges that offer the Pre-IB Programme include, UWC Changshu in China, UWC South East Asia in Singapore, Waterford Kamhlaba UWC of Southern Africa in Eswatini, UWC Thailand, UWC ISAK Japan and UWC East Africa in Tanzania.

== Short courses ==
In addition to its colleges, UWC organises short courses on a range of topics. Short courses are hosted by UWC colleges, national committees in their home regions and UWC alumni groups. They embody the same experiential learning philosophy as the colleges, but without the academic programme, and usually have a duration of 1 – 4 weeks. Short courses were wholly in-person programmes until 2020 when the coordinators of Transforming Identity and Building a Sustainable Future short courses created the first online versions. Since then, online short courses have multiplied and become a core offering of UWC. The longest continuous running short course is the aforementioned Building a Sustainable Future, run by the National Committee of Germany, which has happened every year since 2016. In 2022, 889 participants between 14 and 20 years old attended 23 short courses (15 residential and 8 online) worldwide.

== Funding ==
The UWC model relies heavily on funding support of different philanthropists as well as national governments. In its early years, the United World College of the Atlantic and the UWC International Office were funded by the donations and grants from the Ford Foundation, the Dulverton Trust, and the Bernard Sunley trust, in addition to the British and West German governments, and many smaller funders; the site for Atlantic College, St Donat's Castle, was donated for the college by Antonin Besse II. The colleges in Italy and Canada, in particular, receive significant support and funding from their national and local governments to this day, while the college in Mostar is a collaborative initiative with the IB Organization and was founded with support from various International organizations (including the OSCE, the EU, the CEB, and the UN).

The Davis United World College Scholars Program, established by Shelby M.C. Davis in 2000, provides scholarships for UWC graduates at 99 designated United States colleges and universities. Since its launch, the program has grown to become the world's largest, privately funded, international scholarship program. In 2018, the Davis-UWC Dare to Dream Programme was launched with the support of Shelby M. C. Davis. In 2020, UWC announced a partnership with the Schmidt Futures and the Rhodes Trust, the Rise Programme, through which 15 students with refugee backgrounds will receive all-inclusive scholarships to attend across 3 years from 2021 to 2023, and further educational programmes will be delivered at Kakuma refugee camp in Kenya.

== Notable alumni ==
=== Politics and government ===
- Douglas Alexander: British politician, who served as Scottish Secretary, Transport Secretary, and International Development Secretary in the Blair and Brown cabinets
- Princess Alexia of the Netherlands: second child and daughter of the King of the Netherlands
- Niki Ashton: Canadian Member of Parliament
- Marina Catena: Director United Nations World Food Programme and Lieutenant Italian Army
- João Pedro Cravinho: Foreign Affairs Minister of Portugal, and former Defense Minister
- David Cunliffe: former New Zealand Member of Parliament, Cabinet Minister, and Leader of the Opposition
- Princess Elisabeth, Duchess of Brabant: heir to the Belgian Crown
- jkvr. Corinne Ellemeet: Dutch Member of Parliament
- Lene Feltman Espersen: former Minister of Foreign Affairs, Denmark
- Chrystia Freeland: Former Canadian Deputy Prime Minister and Minister of Finance, Minister of Intergovernmental Affairs, Minister of Foreign Affairs, Minister of Foreign Trade, and member of the Canadian Parliament. Journalist and author.
- Paul Francis Grimes: senior Australian public servant. Former Secretary of the Australian Government Department of Agriculture
- Wang Guangya: Chinese diplomat, former Director of the Hong Kong and Macau Affairs Office of the State Council of the People's Republic of China
- Khairy Jamaluddin: Former Minister of Health, Malaysia
- Kim Han-sol: Grandson of Kim Jong-il
- Ian Khama: Former President of Botswana
- Lousewies van der Laan: Dutch politician, Vice President of the European Liberal Democrats, Chief of Staff to the President of the International Criminal Court
- Leonor, Princess of Asturias: heir to the Spanish Crown
- Nadiem Anwar Makarim: former Minister of Education, Culture, Research, and Technology of the Republic of Indonesia
- Princess Zenani Mandela-Dlamini: sister-in-law of the King of eSwatini and daughter of Nelson and Winnie Mandela
- Eluned Morgan: Welsh politician, member of the House of Lords and former member of the European Parliament
- Tim Owen: British human rights barrister
- Pavlos, Crown Prince of Greece: eldest son of the former and last king of Greece, Constantine II
- Julie Payette: Governor General of Canada 2017-2021 and astronaut
- Princess Raiyah bint Hussein: the younger daughter of King Hussein of Jordan
- David Moinina Sengeh: Minister of Education and Chief Innovation Officer, Sierra Leone
- Lindiwe Sisulu: Minister of Defence and Military Veterans in South Africa
- Elisa Spiropali: Minister for European and Foreign Affairs and previously Speaker of the Parliament, Albania
- Xochitl Torres Small: Former U.S. Under Secretary of Agriculture for Rural Development, Former Member of the U.S. House of Representatives from New Mexico's 2nd congressional district
- Pilvi Torsti: Finnish politician and historian
- Jakob von Weizsäcker: German politician, chief economist of the German Ministry of Finance, Member of the European Parliament
- King Willem-Alexander: King of The Netherlands
- Yuen Pau Woo: Singaporian-Canadian academic and politician
- Princess Purnika of Nepal: Former Princess of Nepal; Former heiress to the throne- Purnika Rajya Laxmi Devi Shah

=== Business ===
- Hakeem Belo-Osagie: Nigerian businessman (energy, finance and telecommunications)
- Jhr. Harold Boël: Belgian entrepreneur and CEO of the holding company Sofina
- Robin Chase: co-founder and the first CEO of Zipcar
- Darren Huston: Canadian businessman, former president and CEO of Priceline and Booking.com
- Pentti Kouri: Finnish economist and venture capitalist
- Robert Milton: Chairman, President and CEO of ACE Aviation Holdings Inc. and Chairman of Air Canada
- Mira Murati: Technology executive; former CTO of OpenAI
- Eyal Ofer: Israeli businessman (real estate and shipping)
- Jorma Ollila: former chairman and CEO of Nokia Corporation
- Todd Sampson: CEO of Leo Burnett, Sydney, co-creator of the Earth Hour initiative
- Peter Sands: CEO of Standard Chartered
- Tellef Thorleifsson: CEO of Norfund

=== Arts and media ===
- Lina Attalah: Egyptian journalist
- Nicholas Dawes, South African journalist and editor
- Juan Pablo Di Pace: Argentinian actor
- Saba Douglas-Hamilton: conservationist and TV presenter
- Sally El-Hosaini: Award-winning Film-maker, Screen International's UK Stars of Tomorrow 2009.
- Anne Enright: Irish author, 2007 winner of the Man Booker Prize for The Gathering
- Richard E. Grant: Swazi-English actor of Withnail and I fame and 2019 Academy Award nominee for Best Supporting Actor for Can You Ever Forgive Me?
- Luke Harding: British journalist and author
- Sophie Hawley-Weld: Singer for band Sofi Tukker
- Hernán Jiménez: Comedian and film director from Costa Rica
- Ashraf Johaardien: playwright from South Africa
- Sonam Kapoor: Indian actor
- Fanny Ketter: Swedish actress
- Eric Khoo: film director from Singapore
- Nakkiah Lui: Australian actor, writer, and comedian
- Valeria Luisello: Writer from México
- Aernout, Baron van Lynden: Dutch-British journalist/war correspondent
- J. Nozipo Maraire: Zimbabwean-born doctor, entrepreneur and writer.
- Karen Mok: Hong-Kong singer, actress and songwriter, three-time Golden Melody Award-winner
- Wangechi Mutu: Kenyan artist and 2010 Deutsche Bank Artist of the Year
- Latif Nasser: Canadian-American director of research and co-host of Radiolab, as well as host of the Netflix series Connected
- Iqbaal Ramadhan: Indonesian actor and musician
- Aki Sasamoto: New York-based Japanese artist
- Tara Sharma: Indian actress
- Jkvr. Fernande van Tets: Dutch journalist and author
- Emma Tucker: British journalist, editor of The Sunday Times

=== Academics ===
- Ruha Benjamin: Professor of African American Studies at Princeton University
- Orsola De Marco: Professor of Astrophysics at Macquarie University
- Alison Donnell: English Professor and Head of School of Literature and Languages at University of Reading
- Tamar Herzog: Monroe Gutman Professor of Latin American Affairs at Harvard University
- Stephan Klasen: Professor of Development Economics, University of Göttingen
- Jonathan Michie: Director of the Department for Continuing Education and President of Kellogg College, University of Oxford
- Gina Neff: Professor of Sociology, Oxford University and Senior Research Fellow, Christ Church, Oxford
- Howard Newby: Vice-Chancellor of the University of Liverpool
- Jukka-Pekka Onnela: Finnish scientist
- David Rueda: Professor of Comparative Politics at Nuffield College, Oxford University
- Shawkat Toorawa: Professor of Arabic Studies, Yale University
- Alan Whiteside: South African academic, researcher and professor, especially known for his work on AIDS in Africa.
- Ghil'ad Zuckermann: Chair of Linguistics and Endangered Languages, University of Adelaide
- Kenneth Surin: Professor emeritus, Duke University, journalist CounterPunch

=== Other fields ===
- Akihiko Hoshide: Japanese astronaut
- Malaika Vaz: youngest explorer to reach Antarctica and Arctic.
- Mayumi Raheem: Sri Lankan swimmer, three times gold medal winner at the 2006 South Asian Games
- Paul Colton: Bishop of Cork, Cloyne and Ross, Ireland
- Andreas Loewe: Dean of Melbourne in the Anglican Church of Melbourne
