= Kathryn Wasserman Davis =

American philanthropist and scholar (1907–2013)

- Born: Kathryn Wasserman; February 25, 1907; United States
- Died: April 23, 2013 (aged 106); Hobe Sound, Florida, U.S.
- Occupations: Investor, painter, philanthropist, and political activist
- Spouse: Shelby Cullom Davis
- Children: 3, including Shelby Davis

Kathryn Wasserman Davis (February 25, 1907 – April 23, 2013) was an American investor, painter, philanthropist, and political activist. She was a longtime promoter of women's rights and planning parenthood. She was committed to engaging local communities, particularly regarding the environment on the Hudson River and Maine coast, and also concerned with access to high-quality education. At the age of 94, she began an artistic adventure, producing more than 200 paintings.

== Personal life and training and early work ==
Kathryn was married to businessman Shelby Cullom Davis, who developed the series of Davis investment instruments and later became the United States Ambassador to Switzerland, from 1969 until 1974. Her husband died in 1994. Early in her career, Mrs. Davis worked for the Council on Foreign Relations and authored The Soviets at Geneva: The USSR and the League of Nations, 1919-1933. An alumna of Wellesley College, she earned a master's degree, in 1931, at Columbia University and, in 1934, a Ph.D. in international relations from the Graduate Institute of International Studies. Physically, she led an active life—with early interests in skiing from the 1930s until she stopped in her mid-90s, a bicyclist throughout her life, a competitor on the tennis court until age 101, and equally so on the croquet field until age 105. She adopted kayaking at age 95 and continued that for ten years. She was swimming at age 106 just weeks before her death.

== Projects for Peace: funding grants source ==
Following an eight-decade legacy in philanthropy, much of it anonymous, Davis launched her signature project on her 100th birthday, in 2007, when she committed $1,000,000 to fund 100 practical, student-led peace actions, each with a $10,000 grant, at selected institutions around the world. This program, called Projects for Peace, has continued annually and expanded.

Davis celebrated her centenary in 2007 and died at her home in Hobe Sound, Florida, on April 23, 2013, at the age of 106 years old.

== Personal history ==
Kathryn Wasserman came from a family of strong Wellesley-educated women. Born in Germantown, Pennsylvania, on February 25, 1907, she said her first memory was of walking in a suffragette parade with her mother as they waved their yellow flags in support of equal rights for women. During her time at a Friends school in Philadelphia, she became an incidental activist for peace, later serving as Secretary of the League for Peace and Freedom at Wellesley College. For her senior year of high school, she attended the Madeira School. As the only Jewish girl in school, she faced many instances of discrimination, yet still excelling academically. In 1929, she journeyed on horseback into the Caucasus Mountains with famed anthropologist Leslie White. After completing her doctoral work in international relations in 1934, she later, following World War II, became active in Planned Parenthood in the Tarrytown, New York, area, coordinating with Eleanor Roosevelt, who was then the national head.

From 1934 into 1935, she worked at the Council on Foreign Relations. In 1937, she was, at age 30, a Pennsylvania member of the Committee for Suggested Improvement for the still-evolving Social Security Laws. From 1940 into 1944, she was President of the National Council on Household Employment. She was also among the early female members of the New York Stock Exchange.

In the 1950s and 1960s, as a busy mother, she focused her activities in the Tarrytown, New York, community, serving as chair of the Westchester Children's Association and foreign policy chair of the League of Women Voters. In the 1970s through the 1990s, her interests turned actively international, with extensive travel, focused on ways of understanding and informing policy-making diplomacy. In this effort, she drew on her education and experience in international relations and her expanding web of global friendships, as well as her own financial means.

Her husband of 62 years, Shelby Cullom Davis, predeceased her in 1994. Her children include one son, Shelby Davis (Shelby Moore Cullom), and two daughters, Diana Cullom Davis Spencer and Priscilla Alden Davis (deceased).

== Philanthropic career ==
The Wasserman family were successful merchants in St. Louis in the middle of the 19th century, and Kathryn's father, Joseph Wasserman, moved to Philadelphia to develop the Art Loom Company. After her marriage to Shelby Cullom Davis on January 4, 1932, the couple began a career of financial investments, concentrating on the then-rising insurance industry, first, in the United States through opportunities provided by the Great Depression and, later, in the 1940s and 1950s, through expanding national and international investments, geared toward long-term growth. In the 1950s, her husband was instrumental in creating the Davis Family of Mutual Funds.

The Wasserman family's philanthropic activity extended throughout Mrs. Davis' long life, building an (often anonymous) legacy of extraordinary generosity. Much of her focus was on sustainable impact. She moderated the risks she took through creating partnerships and building institutional capacity. Typically, she started with smaller gifts and, as organizational capacity was proven, steadily raised it and then, often brought in new partners. Her primary giving was through The Diana Davis Spencer Foundation and the Shelby Cullom Davis Foundation.

She created Projects for Peace on her 100th birthday, which launched 100 prizes of $10,000 each to student projects submitted on a competitive basis. In the ensuing years, nearly 1,000 ideas were implemented, many growing into locally rooted peace actions in a multitude of countries. Her peace-promoting activities often concentrated on youth, including Seeds of Peace and Ploughshares.

She was notable, by herself, for early philanthropic activity in support of parenthood planning and disease prevention. In partnership with her husband, they made a mark with gifts to Princeton University and the Hoover Institute, and as founders of New York City's Lincoln Center, where they established the library, and The Heritage Foundation. In 2007, she and her son, Princeton trustee Shelby M.C. Davis, gave a $5 million gift to create an endowment for Princeton's International Center, now called the 'Kathryn W. and Shelby Cullom Davis ’30 International Center'.

Soon after her undergraduate education, she began supporting Wellesley College, where she was a trustee for 18 years and a leader in all six major fundraising campaigns in the history of the college. Her gifts totaled over $50 million, with significant portions directed to the Davis Museum & Cultural Center, student financial aid, campus revitalization, and professorships in Asian and Slavic studies.

She also had enduring philanthropic interest in Maine, much of it focused on the College of the Atlantic, Friends of Acadia, Maine Coast Heritage Trust, Jackson Laboratory, MDI Biological Laboratory, Northeast Harbor Library, and Northeast Harbor Neighborhood House.

She supported a number of projects in honor of her daughter, including NFTE, Jacob Burns Film Center, EastWest Institute, Wheaton College, and, in the Washington D.C. area, the Apple Tree Institute and Institute for World Politics.

Her earliest philanthropic efforts, dating back to her student days as a resident in International House, reflected her concern for the Hudson River. From those student quarters, she watched construction, in 1932, of the George Washington Bridge, moving her to ponder the ways this estuary connected trade to the Mississippi River, where her family's commercial wealth had begun through American Civil War-era trade. With sustained philanthropic activity over the next 75 years, she supported restoration of the Hudson River for community enjoyment, with particular focus on the efforts of the Scenic Hudson, Teatown Lake Reservation, Stone Barns Center, and Westchester Community College.

Frontiers of medicine also fascinated Kathryn, who had vivid memories of the 1918 flu pandemic, which infected 500 million people around the globe, killing 4 percent of the world's population. An uncle of hers developed the Wasserman test for syphilis. One of her central concerns became research to cure glaucoma, leading to major support of the Bascom Palmer Eye Institute, Pew Biomedical Scholars, and research into the role of genetics and RNA interference. She contributed to the Cold Spring Harbor Laboratory and recent research on Lyme disease.

Kathryn Davis established two totally new academic degree programs: a Master's of Arts in Teaching at the American Museum of Natural History and a Master of Arts Degree in Applied Community Change & Peacebuilding at the Future Generations Graduate School.

== International engagement ==
Her lifelong interest in travel, growing from regular trips to Europe during her childhood, inspired her (as noted above) to take a courageous horseback trip in 1929, during the Stalinist era, through the Caucasus Mountains of the USSR, where her horses and supplies were stolen one night. Building on her doctoral degree in Soviet affairs, she took 29 subsequent trips into the Soviet Union and, after the fall of the Soviet Union, four trips into Russia.

In 1955, she and her mother traveled around India, a country Davis visited again repeatedly. China also became an interest, with trips beginning in 1978 and, most recently, in 2006. The issues of refugee safety that these trips frequently brought to her attention often connected back to the work of the International Rescue Committee.

Switzerland was the country she returned to time and again. It was where she met her future husband, where she did her doctoral studies (and developed her skiing). And from 1969 into 1975, Switzerland was where she served when her husband was its U.S. Ambassador. In 2012, she funded the construction of the library at the Graduate Institute of International and Development Studies, the follow-on institution to what had been her (and her husband's) department of doctoral study at the University of Geneva.

== Personal interests ==
Throughout her life, Davis focused on people and reading. Music performance was a special joy, inspiring her not only to assume a leadership role with her husband in the founding of New York's Lincoln Center, but also to recognize how the arts could connect to peace bridging. This was reflected in her support for the American-Russian Youth Orchestra, which led to her friendships with Joshua Bell, Misha Simonyan, and a world of young performing artists.

Painting — with acrylic, watercolor, and finger techniques — became her new hobby at the age of 94. The more than 200 paintings she produced typically focused on landscapes. Many of them have drawn international recognition and now hang in remarkable locations. She was an active skier until age 90, a competitive tennis player (according to her own rules), as well as a croquet player and a kayaking enthusiast.

== Awards and honours ==
- 1997 Honorary Doctor of Law, Columbia University
- 2007 Honorary Doctor of Languages Middlebury College
- 2009 Honorary Doctor of Letters Wheaton College
- 2010 Honorary Doctor of Letters Institute of World Politics
- The Heritage Foundation, Clare Booth Luce Award
- Harry Edmonds Award International House, New York
- Life Achievement Award, Women's National Republican Club
- 1990 Gold Medal - National Institute of Social Sciences
- 2007 Woodrow Wilson Award - Smithsonian Institution
- 2010 Double Helix Award - Cold Spring Harbor Laboratory
