= Tamar Herzog =

Historian and jurist

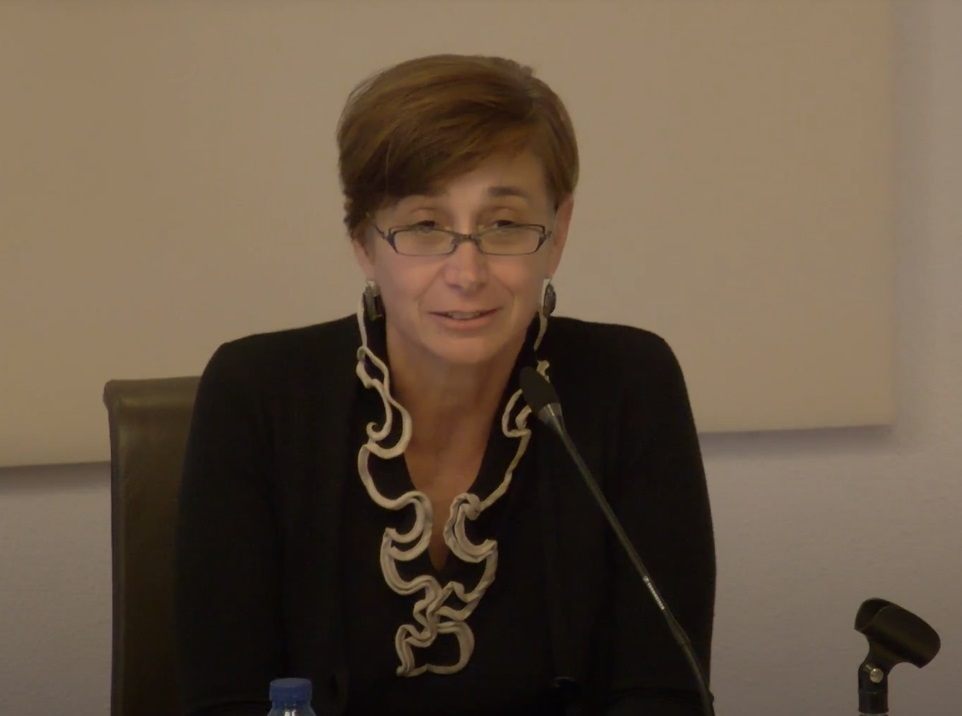

Tamar Herzog (born 10 April 1965) is a historian and jurist. She is the Monroe Gutman Professor of Latin American Affairs at Harvard University, Radcliffe Alumnae Professor, and an Affiliated Faculty Member at the Harvard Law School. She previously taught at Stanford University, University of Chicago and Autonomous University of Madrid. Her work concentrates on early modern European history, colonial Latin American history, imperial history, Atlantic history, and Legal history.

== Career ==
Herzog studied at the Lester B Pearson United World College of the Pacific before graduating in 1987 with a degree in law from Hebrew University of Jerusalem, followed by a Master of Arts from the Department of Spanish and Latin American Studies and a Diplôme d'Etudes Approfondies (Master of Advanced Studies) from the Ecole des Hautes Etudes en Sciences Sociales in Paris.

Herzog, who practiced as a litigating attorney prior to pursuing her academic career, obtained her Ph.D. at the École des Hautes Etudes en Sciences Sociales in Paris, and started her teaching career in Spain, first as a visitor at the Complutense University of Madrid (UCM) and then as an associate professor at the Autonomous University of Madrid (UAM). In 1996 she was invited as a member to the Institute for Advanced Study (IAS) at Princeton and, in 1997, she joined the faculty of the University of Chicago in the department of history, where she became professor of history in 2003. During her years in Chicago, Herzog spent a year as the Jean Monnet Fellow at the European University Institute in Florence, Italy.

In 2005 she was appointed professor of history at Stanford University and, in 2013, after a sabbatical year as a Guggenheim fellow, she joined Harvard University as the Monroe Gutman Professor of Latin American Affairs, professor of Spanish and Portuguese history, Radcliffe Alumnae Professor, and became an affiliated faculty member at the Harvard Law School.

In November 2022 Dr. Herzog has been awarded the Humboldt Research Award honoring lifelong achievement.

Herzog is the co-director of the Columnaria, an international research network centered on the working of the Spanish monarchy and has worked in multiple international panels evaluating or advising on projects funded by the European Science Foundation, and national research agencies across the globe.

== Books ==
- La administración como un fenómeno social: la justicia penal de la ciudad de Quito (1650–1750). Madrid: Centro de Estudios Constitucionales, 1995
- Los ministros de la Audiencia de Quito 1650–1750. Quito: Libri-Mundi, 1995.
- Mediación, archivos y ejercicio: los escribanos de Quito (siglo XVII-XVIII). Frankfurt: Vittorio Klostermann, 1996.
- Ritos de control, prácticas de negociación: Pesquisas, visitas y residencias y las relaciones entre Quito y Madrid (1650-1750).Madrid: Fundación Hernando de Larramendi, 2000.
- Rendre la justice à Quito (1650–1750). Paris: L’Harmattan, 2001 (French translation of La administración como un fenómeno social).
- Defining Nations: Immigrants and Citizens in Early Modern Spain and Spanish America. New Haven: Yale University Press, 2003.
- Upholding Justice: State, Law and the Penal System in Quito. Ann Arbor: University of Michigan Press, 2004 (updated and revised translation of La administración como un fenónemo social).
- Vecinos y extranjeros. Hacerse español en la edad moderna. Madrid: Alianza Editorial, 2006 (Spanish translation of Defining Nations).
- Rites de contrôl et pratiques de négociation dans l'Empire espagnol. Dialogues distant entre Quito et Madrid (1650-1750). Paris: L'Harmattan, 2014 (French translation of Ritos de Control).
- Frontiers of Possession: Spain and Portugal in Europe and the Americas. Cambridge MA: Harvard University Press, 2015.
- Nations, citoyens, immigrés dans l'Espagne et l'Amérique espagnole au XVIIIe siècle. Paris: Le Poisson Volant, 2017 (French translation of Defining Nations).
- A Short History of European Law: The Last Two and a Half Millennia Cambridge, MA Harvard University Press, January 2018.
- Fronteiras da posse: Portugal e Espanha na Europa e na América Lisbon: Imprensa de Ciências Sociais, 2018 (Portuguese translation of "Frontiers of Possession: Spain and Portugal in Europe and the Americas")
- Fronteras de posesión: España y Portugal en Europa y las Américas Madrid: Fondo de Cultura Económica,2018 (Spanish translation of "Frontiers of Possession: Spain and Portugal in Europe and the Americas")
- 欧洲法律简史：两千五百年来的变迁, Beijing: China University of Political Sciences and Law Press, 2019 (Chinese translation of "A Short History of European Law: The Last Two and a Half Millennia").
- Una breve historia del derecho europeo: los últimos 2500 años, Madrid: Alianza Editorial, 2019 (Spanish translation of "A Short History of European Law: The Last Two and a Half Millennia").
- Fronteiras da posse. Espanha e Portugal na Europa e na América, Belo Horizonte, Arraes Editores, 2019 (Brazilian Portuguese translation of "Frontiers of Possession: Spain and Portugal in Europe and the Americas").
- Une brève histoire du droit en Europe : les 2500 dernières années, Toulouse: Anacharsis édition, 2023 (French translation of "A Short History of European Law: The Last Two and a Half Millennia").
- 유럽법약사 A Short History of European Law, Seoul: Minsokwon Publishing Company, 2023 (Korean translation of "A Short History of European Law: The Last Two and a Half Millennia").

Edited Volumes:

- Observation and Communication: The Construction of Realities in the Hispanic World. Frankfurt: Vittorio Klostermann, 1997 (with J.M. Scholz).
- The Collective and the Public in Latin America. Cultural Identities and Political Order Brighton: Sussex Academic Press, 2000 (with Luis Roniger).
- Polycentric Monarchies. How did Early Modern Spain and Portugal Achieve and Maintain a Global Hegemony? Brighton: Sussex Academic Press, 2012 (with Pedro Cardim, José Javier Ruiz Ibáñez and Gaetano Sabatini).
- The Cambridge History of Latin American Law in Global Perspective Cambridge UK: Cambridge University Press, 2024 (with Thomas Duve).

== Major works ==
Upholding Justice - Society, State, and the Penal System in Quito (1650–1750)

In the 2004 revised edition of her first book Herzog uses a combination of legal and historical analysis and challenges the traditional paradigm of an all powering colonial state. Her research reveals a dynamic interaction between the administration and society, where social networks, reputation, and morality guide the work of individuals involved in making justice. Upholding Justice demonstrates the impossibility of studying crime without understanding the system that administered its prosecution and punishment.

Defining Nations - Immigrants and Citizens in early modern Spain and Spanish America

In this 2003 book Herzog explores early modern categories of citizenship and belonging. Challenging the theories that communities were either the natural result of common factors such as language or religion, or that they were artificially imagined, Herzog reexamines how Spaniards constructed their communities on both sides of the Ocean. She argues that the distinction between Spaniards and foreigners came about as local communities distinguished individuals who were willing to take on the rights and duties of membership in that community from those who did not. She demonstrates that, rather than states replacing local communities, local citizenship persisted in the early modern period. The Spanish state in both Europe and the Americas consisted of a conglomerate of local communities, each defining its own citizens. Herzog also argues that if we followed her analysis, which reads from conflict what ordinary life was like, we may be able to apply this reinterpretation also to the English, Italian, and French cases, which so far were studied by using a different methodology.

Frontiers of Possession - Spain and Portugal in Europe and the Americas

In this 2015 book described as "ground breaking work" and "pioneering approach", Herzog asks how territorial divisions were established in Europe and the Americas during the early modern period and challenges the standard view that boundaries between polities were largely determined by military conflicts or treaties. Focusing on Spanish and Portuguese claims in the New and Old Worlds, Herzog reconstructs the different ways land rights were discussed and enforced, sometimes violently, among ordinary people who vindicated old rights or envisioned obtaining new ones. Questioning the habitual narrative that starts with Europe in order to understand the Americas, Herzog begins in the Americas, where settlers, military men, governors and missionaries had to decide who could settle the land, who could collect fruit, and who had river rights. She examines how these individuals dealt with the presence of indigenous peoples, whom they classified as enemies to vanquish or allies to befriend. In Europe, meanwhile, the formation and re-formation of boundaries could last for centuries, as demands to respect ancient entitlements clashed with changing economic, political, and legal conditions. Herzog demonstrates that territorial control was subject to ongoing negotiations confronting members, neighbors, and outsiders.

A Short History of European Law: The Last Two and a Half Millennia

In this book, Herzog offers a comprehensive, yet brief, summary of the development of European law from Roman times to the emergence and establishment of the European Union. Herzog embraces the history of both common and civil law, and demonstrates how colonialism contributed to their emergence and expansion. This great journey across time and space targets both specialists and non-specialists, both historians and lawyers. The aim is to give students, scholars and even a broader audience a solid and at the same time inspiring introduction to the political, social, and cultural roots of law as well as the impact of law upon society. In this survey, Herzog stresses the constructed character of the law and its context-dependency. She makes a powerful case for why this history is important not only to understand the past, but also to acquire instruments to understand the present.

== Academic awards ==
- XIV International Prize of Spanish American Legal History Ricardo Levene, corresponding to the period 2000–2002 for the book Ritos de control, prácticas de negociación, 2003
- Guggenheim Fellowship, 2012–2013
- Walter Channing Cabot Fellow, 2016 in recognition for outstanding publications - Harvard University
- James A. Rawley Prize in Atlantic History (Awarded by the American Historical Association) for the book Frontiers of Possession – October 2016
- Everett Mendelsohn Excellence in Mentoring Award (2020)
- Humboldt Research Award - November 2022
