= Davis United World College Scholars Program =

International scholarship program

The Davis United World College Scholars Program is the world's largest privately funded international scholarship program. It awards need-based scholarship funding, aka the Shelby Davis Scholarship, to graduates of schools and colleges in the United World Colleges (UWC) movement to study at 106 select partner universities in the United States.

Shelby Davis co-founded the scholarship program in 2000 along with Phil Geier, former President of UWC-USA. Once UWC graduates enroll in one of the Program's partner U.S. colleges or universities, the Program provides financial support for their undergraduate educations through institutional grants that support need-based scholarships. Originally, the scholarship was offered to students matriculating at one of five colleges in the United States: the College of the Atlantic, Middlebury College, Colby College, Wellesley College and Princeton University. The network of eligible universities has since grown to 106.

The scholarship is restricted to students who have completed the International Baccalaureate Diploma Programme at one of the 18 schools or colleges in the United World Colleges (UWC) movement. UWC is an educational movement including 18 sixth form colleges (upper-level secondary schools) and full schools located throughout the world that educate international students from 160 countries, with a focus on peace and sustainability.

Five years after the program was launched, the Boston Globe wrote "The effects [of the Davis Scholarships] have been dramatic. At Colby, where total enrollment is 1,800, international enrollment jumped from 6 percent to 10 percent in five years. At College of the Atlantic, which has just 265 students, 17 percent come from other countries, up from a handful before the Davis scholarships. At Wellesley and Princeton, international enrollments have grown from 6 percent to 8 percent." More recently, the president of Colby college has said that the program "changed American higher education by making the best colleges and universities available to deserving students from around the world."

As of 2020, the program had paid the tuition of over 10,000 students.

== Participating universities ==
As of 2025, there are 106 participating universities:

1. Amherst College (Amherst, MA)
2. Babson College (Babson Park, MA)
3. Bard College (Annandale-on-Hudson, NY)
4. Barnard College (New York, NY)
5. Bates College (Lewiston, ME)
6. Bennington College (Bennington, VT)
7. Bowdoin College (Brunswick, ME)
8. Brandeis University (Waltham, MA)
9. Brown University (Providence, RI)
10. Bryn Mawr College (Bryn Mawr, PA)
11. Bucknell University (Lewisburg, PA)
12. Carleton College (Northfield, MN)
13. Case Western Reserve University (Cleveland, OH)
14. Claremont McKenna College (Claremont, CA)
15. Clark University (Worcester, MA)
16. Colby College (Waterville, ME)
17. Colgate University (Hamilton, NY)
18. College of Idaho (Caldwell, ID)
19. College of the Atlantic (Bar Harbor, ME)
20. Colorado College (Colorado Springs, CO)
21. Columbia University (New York, NY)
22. Concordia College (Moorhead, MN)
23. Connecticut College (New London, CT)
24. Cornell University (Ithaca, NY)
25. Dartmouth College (Hanover, NH)
26. Davidson College (Davidson, NC)
27. Denison University (Granville, OH)
28. Drexel University (Philadelphia, PA)
29. Duke University (Durham, NC)
30. Earlham College (Richmond, IN)
31. Emory University (Atlanta, GA)
32. Florida Atlantic University (Boca Raton, FL)
33. Franklin & Marshall College (Lancaster, PA)
34. Furman University (Greenville, SC)
35. George Washington University (Washington, DC)
36. Georgetown University (Washington, DC)
37. Gettysburg College (Gettysburg. PA)
38. Goucher College (Baltimore, MD)
39. Grinnell College (Grinnell, IA)
40. Hamilton College (Clinton, NY)
41. Harvard College (Cambridge, MA)
42. Harvey Mudd College (Claremont, CA)
43. Hood College (Frederick, MD)
44. Ithaca College (Ithaca, NY)
45. Johns Hopkins University (Baltimore, MD)
46. Kalamazoo College (Kalamazoo, MI)
47. Lake Forest College (Lake Forest, IL)
48. Lehigh University (Bethlehem, PA)
49. Lewis & Clark College (Portland, OR)
50. Luther College (Decorah, IA)
51. Macalester College (Saint Paul, MN)
52. Massachusetts Institute of Technology - MIT (Cambridge, MA)
53. Methodist University (Fayetteville, NC)
54. Middlebury College (Middlebury, VT)
55. Mount Holyoke College (South Hadley, MA)
56. New York University (New York, NY)
57. Northwestern University (Evanston, IL)
58. Oberlin College (Oberlin, OH)
59. Occidental College (Los Angeles, CA)
60. Pitzer College (Claremont, CA)
61. Pomona College (Claremont, CA)
62. Princeton University (Princeton, NJ)
63. Queens University of Charlotte (Charlotte, NC)
64. Randolph-Macon College (Ashland, VA)
65. Reed College (Portland, OR)
66. Ringling College of Art and Design (Sarasota, FL)
67. Sarah Lawrence College (Bronxville, NY)
68. Savannah College of Art & Design (Savannah, GA)
69. School of the Art Institute of Chicago (Chicago, IL)
70. Scripps College (Claremont, CA)
71. Sewanee: The University of the South (Sewanee, TN)
72. Skidmore College (Saratoga Springs, NY)
73. Smith College (Northampton, MA)
74. St. John's College (Annapolis, MD & Santa Fe, NM)
75. St. Lawrence University (Canton, NY)
76. St. Olaf College (Northfield, MN)
77. Stanford University (Palo Alto, CA)
78. Swarthmore College (Swarthmore, PA)
79. Texas State University (San Marcos, TX)
80. Trinity College (Hartford, CT)
81. Tufts University (Medford, MA)
82. Tulane University (New Orleans, LA)
83. Union College (Schenectady, NY)
84. University of California, Berkeley (Berkeley, CA)
85. University of Chicago (Chicago, IL)
86. University of Florida (Gainesville, FL)
87. University of Michigan (Ann Arbor, MI)
88. University of North Carolina at Chapel Hill (Chapel Hill, NC)
89. University of Oklahoma (Norman, OK)
90. University of Pennsylvania (Philadelphia, PA)
91. University of Richmond (Richmond, VA)
92. University of Rochester (Rochester, NY)
93. University of St. Thomas (St. Paul, MN)
94. University of Tampa (Tampa, FL)
95. University of Virginia (Charlottesville, VA)
96. Vanderbilt University (Nashville, TN)
97. Vassar College (Poughkeepsie, NY)
98. Wartburg College (Waverly, IA)
99. Washington & Lee University (Lexington, VA)
100. Wellesley College (Wellesley, MA)
101. Wesleyan University (Middletown, CT)
102. Wheaton College (Norton, MA)
103. Whitman College (Walla Walla, WA)
104. Williams College (Williamstown, MA)
105. Worcester Polytechnic Institute (Worcester, MA)
106. Yale University (New Haven, CT)
