= United World College Thailand =

UWC Thailand International School
- โรงเรียนนานาชาติ ยูดับเบิลยูซี ประเทศไทย

Location
- Thalang, Phuket; 8.051010°N 98.352364°E

Information
- Former name: Phuket International Academy Day School (PIADS)
- School type: International school; Day and boarding school; International day and boarding school
- Motto: Good Heart, Balanced Mind, Healthy Body
- Established: 2009
- Head of School: David Griffiths
- Grades: Nursery–Grade 12
- Enrollment: ~500 from 60+ countries
- Education system: IB PYP, IB MYP, IB Diploma
- Language: English, with mother tongue classes offered
- Sports: Swimming, football, basketball, running and more.
- Mascot: Manta ray
- Accreditation: CIS, ISAT, EARCOS
- Affiliation: United World Colleges, World Academy of Sport, IBO
- Website: https://uwcthailand.ac.th/
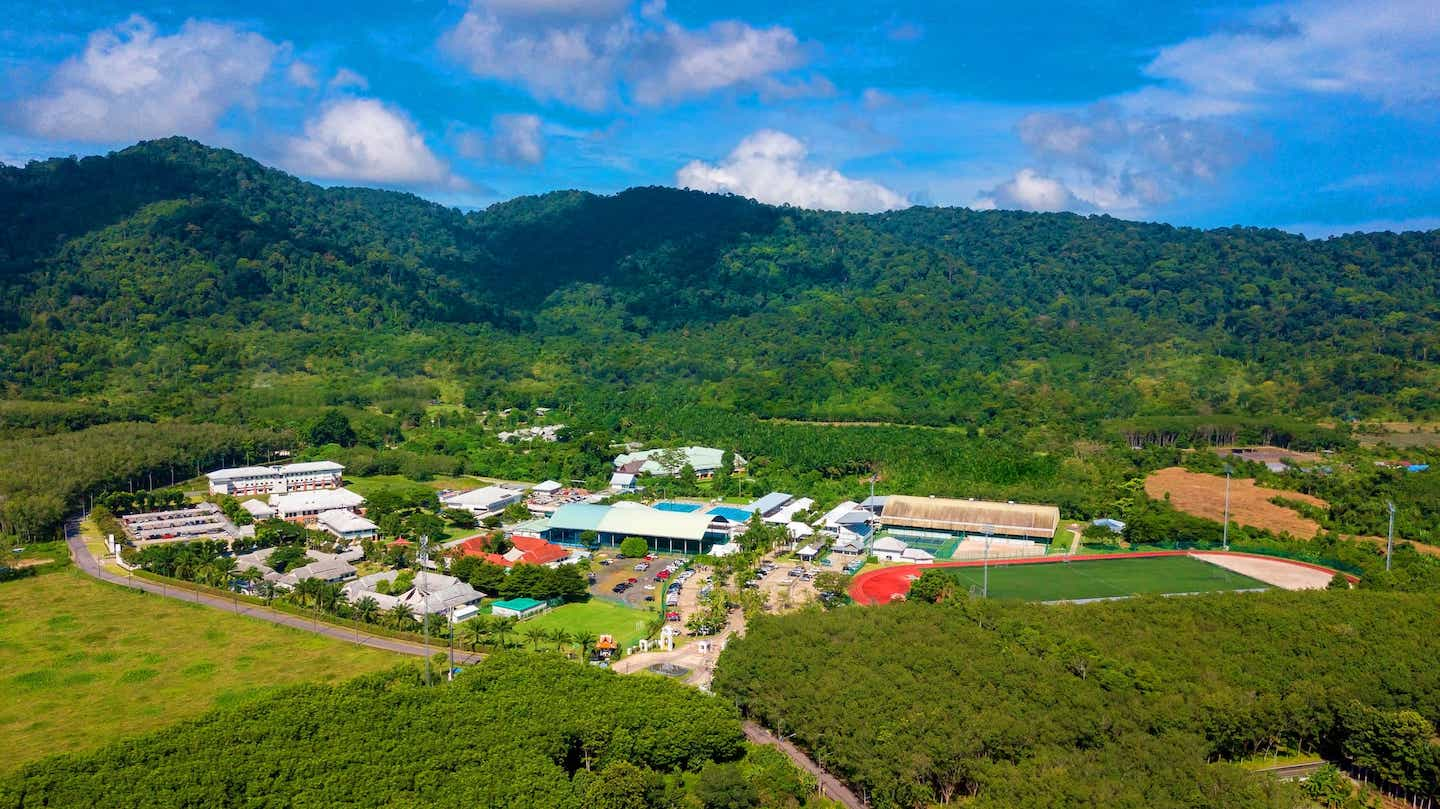

United World College Thailand (commonly referred to as UWC Thailand and abbreviated as UWCT; Thai: โรงเรียนนานาชาติ ยูดับเบิลยูซี ประเทศไทย, RTGS: Rong Rian Nana Chat Yu Dapboenyu Si Prathet Thai) is an independent, non-profit, international day and boarding school located at the foothills of Khao Phra Thaeo Wildlife Sanctuary, in Phuket province, Thailand. The school is the 16th member of the United World Colleges, and was officially opened in 2016 by Queen Noor of Jordan, the organization's President.

UWC Thailand is a school in the UWC movement with the shared aim of "Making education a force to unite people, nations and cultures for peace and a sustainable future". It provides about US$3 million in scholarships annually, primarily to support students selected by the UWC movement. The UWC movement was nominated for a Nobel Peace Prize in 2022.

The school offers an International Baccalaureate continuum education from Nursery to Grade 12. The IB Primary Years Programme is provided for early childhood (Nursery, Preschool and Kindergarten), and primary school (grades 1–5), the IB Middle Years Programme for grades 6–10, and the IB Diploma Programme for grades 11–12. It is attended by approximately 500 students of over 60 nationalities.

UWC Thailand is authorized by IBO, a member of CIS, EARCOS and ISAT, and is affiliated with World Academy of Sport.

== Gallery ==
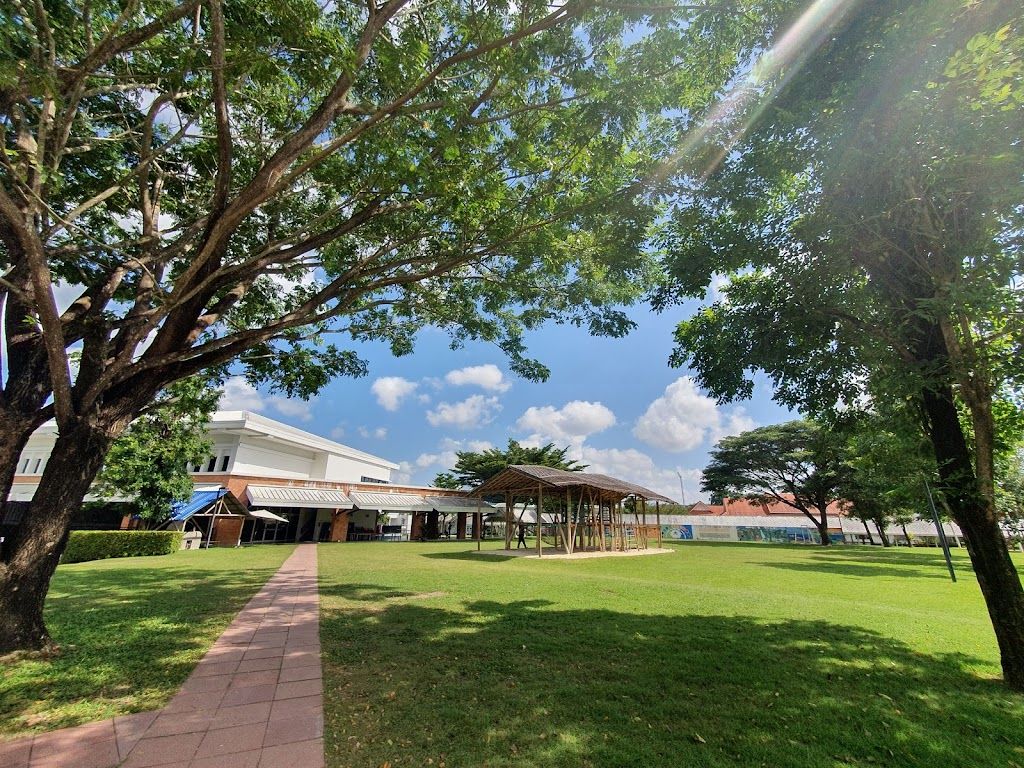

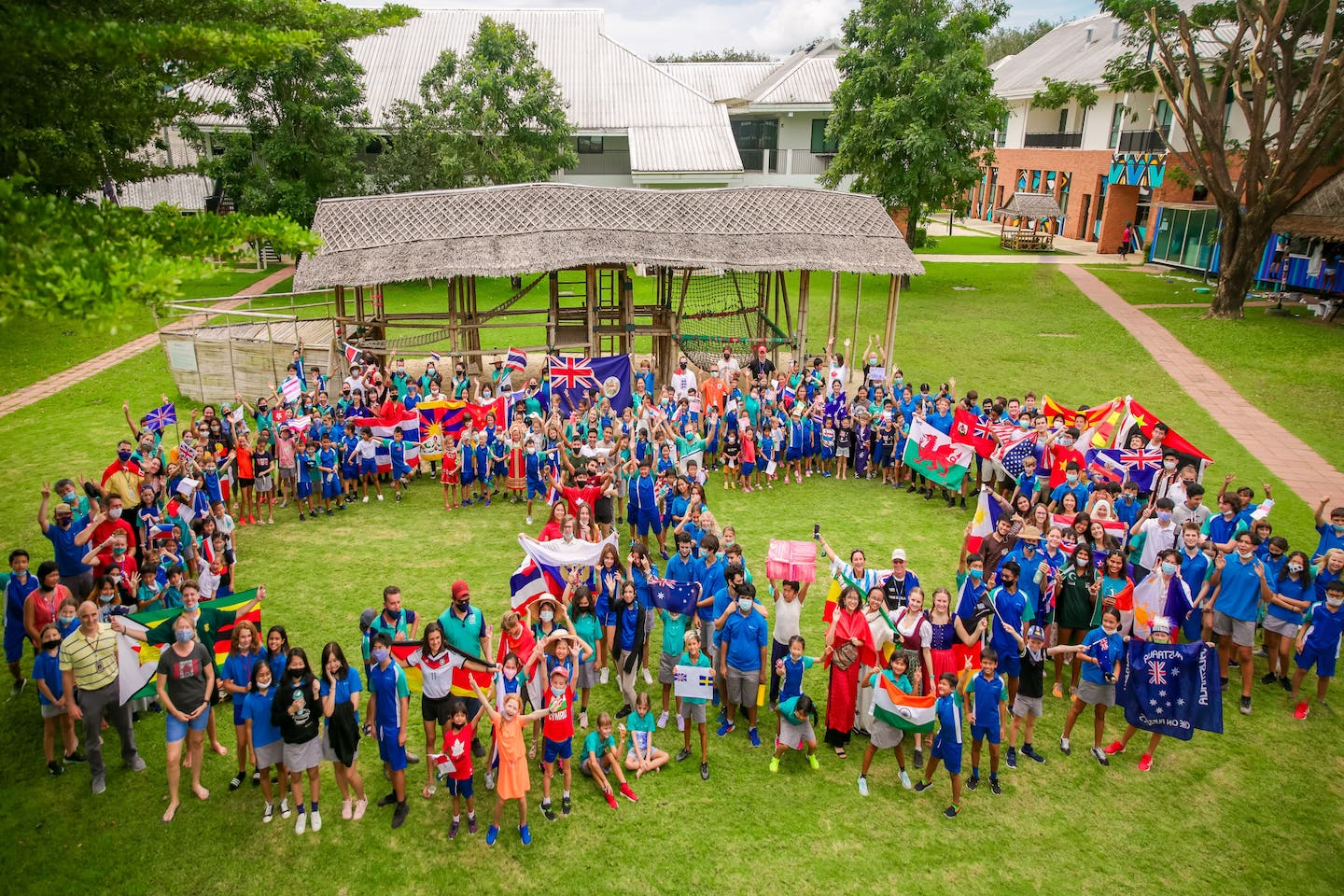

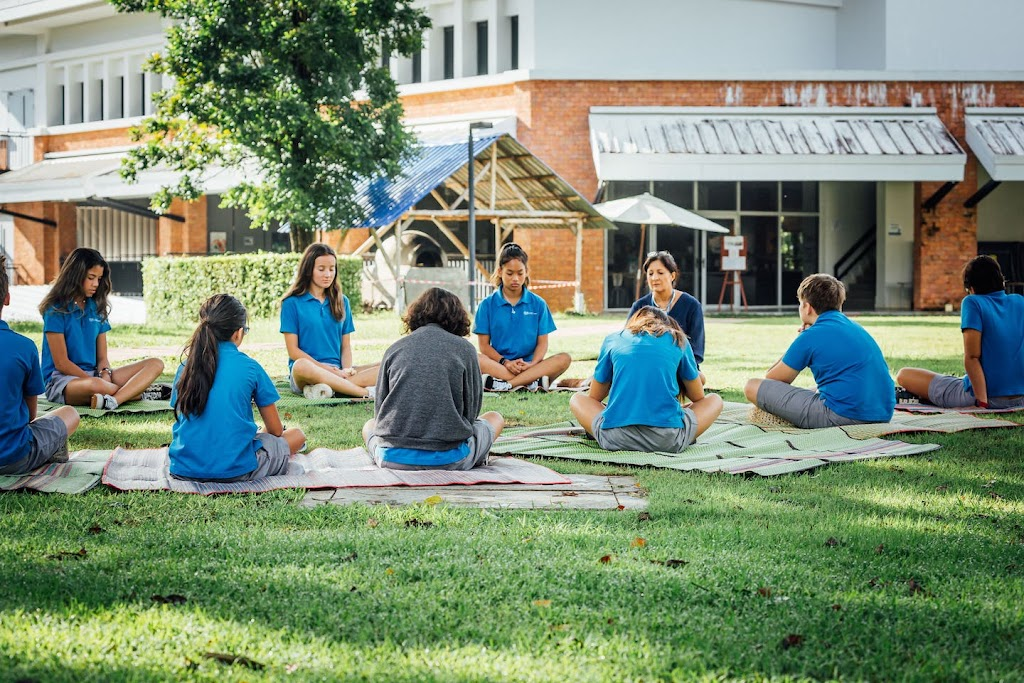

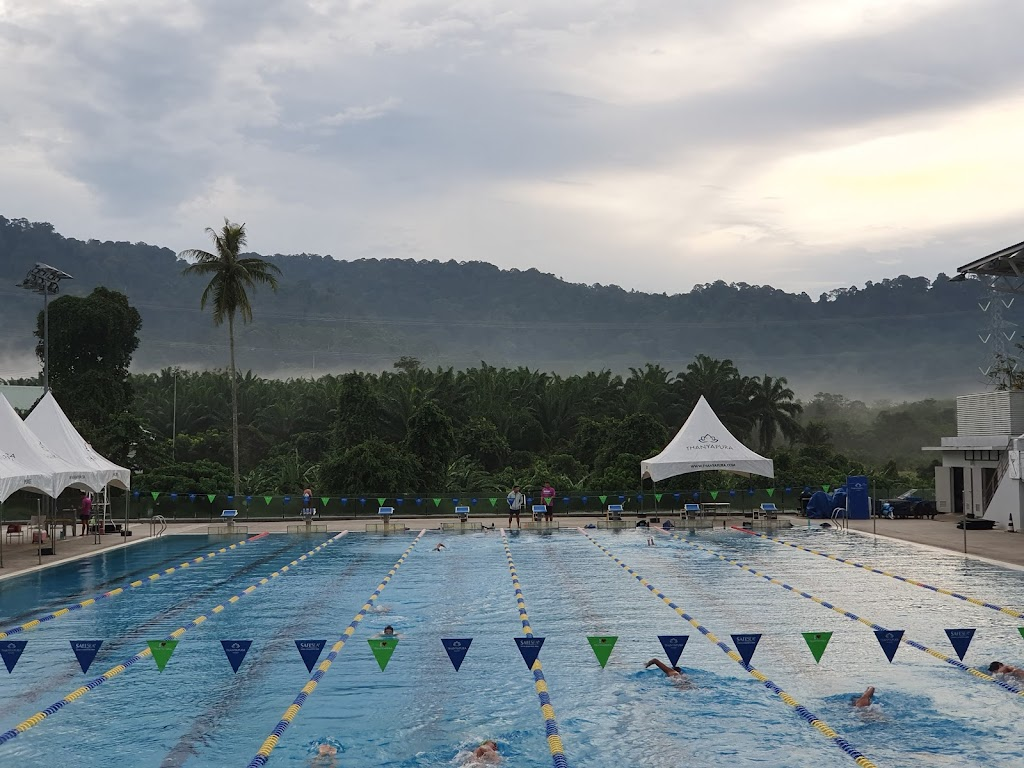

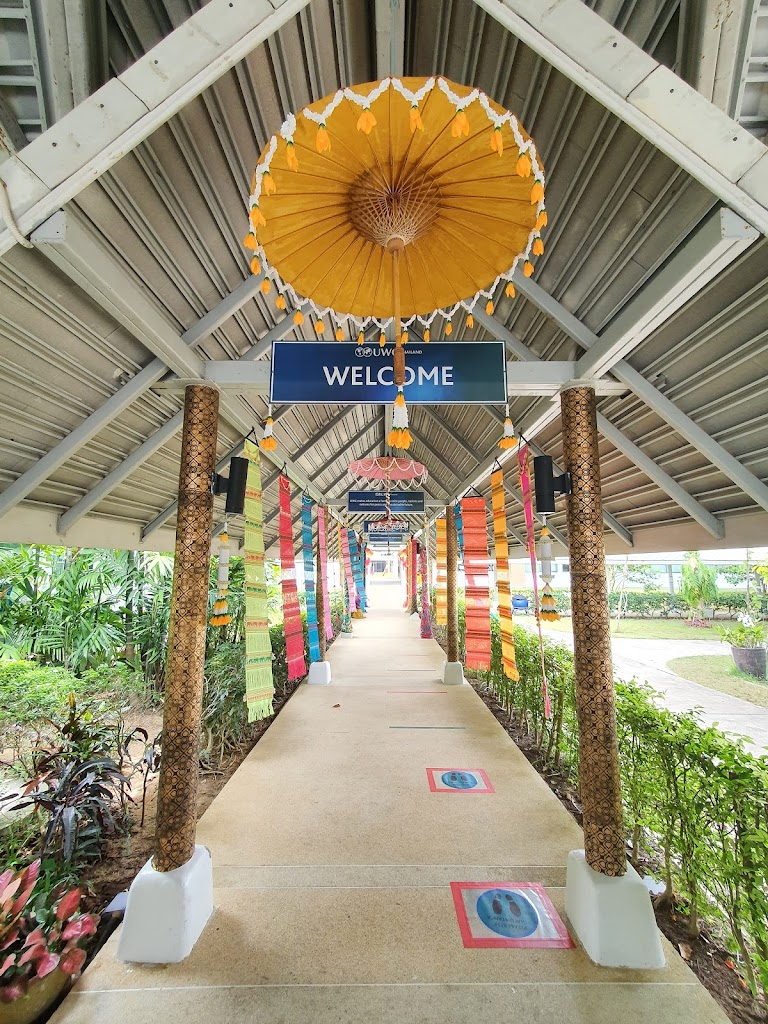
