= United World College of the Adriatic =

International Baccalaureate program in Italy

Coordinates: 45°46′24″N 13°36′19″E

- Duino Castle, which houses parts of the school
- Duino, Friuli-Venezia Giulia; Italy

Information
- Type: Private, international and boarding school
- Motto: UWC makes education a force to unite people, nations and cultures for peace and a sustainable future
- Established: 1982
- President: Roberto Antonione
- Rettore: Marco Gemelli
- Age: 16 to 19
- Enrollment: c. 200
- Education system: International Baccalaureate
- Campus type: Residential, urban
- Affiliation: United World Colleges
- Website: www.uwcad.it

The United World College of the Adriatic (also known as UWC Adriatic, UWCAd, or in Italian, Collegio del Mondo Unito dell'Adriatico) is a private, international boarding school in northern Italy. It is a member of the United World Colleges, a global educational movement that brings together students from all over the world with the aim to foster peace and international understanding. The college is attended by around 180 students aged between 16 and 19, from around 80 countries, who live in the college for two years and study for the International Baccalaureate Diploma Programme.

The college is located in Duino, in the province of Trieste, in Italy's north-eastern region of Friuli-Venezia Giulia, and is located less than 5 km (3.1 mi) from the Slovenian border. The college sits at a historical crossroads of Latin, Germanic and Slavic cultures and languages. Founded in 1982, with the support of the Italian government and regional authorities (who are still major financial supporters of the college) UWC Adriatic's position close to what was then the southernmost edge of the “Iron Curtain” shaped its mission of promoting intercultural dialogue and peace.

== Founding ==
The United World Colleges were established by German educator Kurt Hahn, and the college is heavily influenced by his pedagogical philosophy. Following the founding the United World College of the Atlantic in 1962, further colleges were opened in Singapore (the United World College of South East Asia) and Canada (the Lester B Pearson United World College of the Pacific).

Lord Mountbatten, then the president of the United World Colleges, collaborated with Prince Raimond of Torre e Tasso, to found the United World College of the Adriatic in Duino, the first in the movement based in a non-English speaking country. With the support of local politician, former Vice Minister for Foreign Affairs and member of Parliament Corrado Belci, a law was passed in 1976 which ensured that the regional government of Friuli-Venezia Giulia would provide funding and support for the new institution. The college continues to benefit from support from both the government of the Autonomous Region of Friuli-Venezia Giulia, and the Italian Ministry of Foreign Affairs and International Cooperation.

During the planning phase of the college, an international education panel was convened to help shape its academic and social vision. Recognizing Trieste’s historic role as a meeting point between Italian, Germanic, and Slavic cultures, the panel included representatives from several countries, including Austria, the Federal Republic of Germany, Hungary, Italy, Malta, the Netherlands, Switzerland, the United Kingdom, the United States, and the European Economic Community. Among its recommendations were that English should serve as the primary language of instruction, while students would also study Italian as part of the International Baccalaureate programme and learn enough Slovene to communicate with neighbouring communities.

The choice of Duino as the college’s location was strongly influenced by the support of Prince Raimondo della Torre e Tasso, the owner of Duino Castle. The castle is also associated with the poet Rainer Maria Rilke, who wrote the first two of the Duino Elegies there, and it hosted an educational conference organised by the Italian founding group and the UWC International Office in June 1974 to discuss the academic and social programme of a future United World College in Italy. While the prince continued to reside in the main part of the castle, several eighteenth-century buildings on the estate had long remained unused and were considered suitable for conversion into educational facilities. The involvement of Corrado Belci, a former member of the Italian Parliament with strong connections in both Trieste and Rome, also proved crucial in securing political and institutional support for the project.

When planning resumed, the educational design of the college combined elements from earlier United World Colleges. Inspired by the United World College of the Atlantic, Duino Castle would serve as the symbolic centre of the institution, while the surrounding village environment allowed the development of a “village college” model similar to that of Pearson College in Canada. Rather than constructing a self-contained campus with extensive grounds, planners envisioned a distributed model in which different residential buildings and facilities would be located throughout the village of Duino. This model also reflected an educational philosophy emphasizing community-oriented environment drawing on the warmth of Italian social culture, encouraging close interaction between students, staff, and local families, and fostering a diverse teaching staff in which colleagues from different cultural backgrounds would share equal responsibility for shaping the college’s social and educational atmosphere.

The college welcomed its first students in 1982. In 1984, Prince Charles, having taken on the role as president of the International Council of the United World Colleges, inaugurated the third academic year in his first visit to the college.

== Scholarships and peace-building initiatives ==
From its early years, the college focused on students from Central, Eastern and South-eastern Europe, reflecting its position close to the former Cold War border with Yugoslavia. The college community engaged directly with major political transformations in the region, including the fall of the Berlin Wall, the breakup of the Soviet Union and the conflicts in the former Yugoslavia. The college’s work in the region contributed to the later establishment of the United World College in Mostar following the Bosnian War. In recent years the college has expanded its focus toward the wider Mediterranean region and the Middle East, including students affected by conflict and displacement.

The college hosts special scholarships connected to peace-building initiatives. In 2023, the Nelson Mandela Peace Scholarship was awarded to a Ukrainian and a Russian student, highlighting the institution’s mission of fostering dialogue and understanding between students from countries experiencing conflict.

In 2025, the Italian National Committee for the United World Colleges launched a scholarship programme for unaccompanied foreign minors living in Italy. Supported by the Fondazione De Agostini and Generali foundations, the programme offers two full scholarships for students aged 16–19 to attend UWC Adriatic and complete the International Baccalaureate Diploma Programme. The initiative is implemented under the patronage of the United Nations High Commissioner for Refugees (UNHCR) and in collaboration with UNICEF and the UNICEF U-Report programme.

In addition to its general scholarship programme, UWC Adriatic has developed several targeted scholarship initiatives aimed at supporting students from conflict-affected regions and underrepresented backgrounds. Since 2017, the college has maintained the Giulio Regeni Scholarship, dedicated to the memory of UWC alumnus Giulio Regeni and designed to bring Egyptian students selected by the UWC National Committee in Egypt to study at the college. Other initiatives include scholarships for refugee students in cooperation with the United Nations High Commissioner for Refugees (UNHCR), as well as fundraising campaigns supporting students from Afghanistan, Gaza, and Eastern Europe. These programmes reflect the college’s long-standing emphasis on educational access and peace-building through international dialogue.

UWC Adriatic also offers music scholarships through the International Community Music Academy (ICMA) programme. These scholarships are awarded to students admitted to the college who demonstrate exceptional musical talent and potential to pursue advanced music studies. The award supports instrumental or vocal training during the two-year International Baccalaureate programme and may include lessons, masterclasses, and performance opportunities organised by the college’s music department.

== Students and staff ==
The school hosts around 180 students across its two year program, from over 80 countries. More than 80 nationalities are represented in the student body, of which approximately 15% are Italian, 15% came from elsewhere in Western Europe, 20% from Eastern Europe, 15% from the Americas, 15% from Africa and the Middle East, and 20% from Asia and Oceania. The majority of students attend the college with financial support. Around 90% of students receive scholarships, including 76% on full scholarships, while 14% contribute partially through their national committees and about 10% cover the full cost of attendance.

Most students attending the college are selected by UWC national selection committees in their home countries on the basis of academic achievement, leadership potential, extracurricular activities involvement and personal qualities, and are awarded scholarships based on need. The Italian national committee is responsible for the selection of Italian pupils to UWC Adriatic and for attendance at each of the United World Colleges, and acts under the patronage of the President of the Italian Republic.

Teachers are also hired internationally. In addition to being responsible for classroom teaching they act as personal tutors for groups of students and contribute to the running of activities and services. The college employs approximately 34 members of academic staff and around 20 full-time administrative staff. The teaching staff represent a wide range of national backgrounds, with educators from around 18 different nationalities contributing to the international character of the college community.

The founding headmaster of the college was David B. Sutcliffe, an influential part of the United World Colleges movement, who had been the headmaster at the first UWC, Atlantic College. In August 2022, Khalid El-Metaal, who was previously the deputy head at the Toronto French School in Canada and served as Deputy Headteacher at the Modern English School of Cairo, took over as the Rettore (headmaster). In 2026, Marco Gemelli took over the role.

Since September 2024, the president of the college has been Roberto Antonione, who succeeded Ambassador Cristina Ravaglia. He was appointed by the Regional Government of Friuli Venezia Giulia with the endorsement of United World Colleges International. Antonione has held a number of public roles in Italy and in international cooperation, including Senator of the Republic, Member of Parliament, Undersecretary of State at the Ministry of Foreign Affairs, President of the Parliamentary Delegation of the Central European Initiative (CEI), and Secretary General of the CEI.

== College and facilities ==
The college is integrated into the village of Duino, located on the Adriatic Sea between Trieste and Monfalcone, with school buildings and facilities interspersed with residential and commercial properties in the village. Students live in 9 residences, with the smallest housing 6 students, and the largest just over 50. The largest residence is part of the complex of the Duino castle, which towers over the community.

The college hosts the International Community Music Academy (ICMA). The academy originated as the International School of Chamber Music, established at UWC Adriatic with the participation of the renowned Trio di Trieste: pianist Dario De Rosa, violinist Renato Zanettovich and cellist Amedeo Baldovino to provide advanced chamber music training for students and young musicians. In 2015, in the presence of Italian President Sergio Mattarella, the programme was renamed the International Community Music Academy (ICMA), reflecting its broader emphasis on intercultural musical collaboration and education. Additionally, the college collaborates with the Scuola Trio di Trieste, which offers professional musical education, and, together with Luther College, hosts the International Music Festival of the Adriatic.

== Education and student life ==
The core academic curriculum at the college is the International Baccalaureate diploma (IB), a two year, pre-university programme. Courses at the college are taught in English, but students are not selected on the basis of their ability to speak English. In addition, all students are required to take Italian classes, in order to participate in and contribute to their local community.

The college offers a range of subjects, including some that were first developed at the school. "World Arts and Cultures," which was developed at the college as a school-based syllabus, is now taught by IB schools in several countries. The World Arts and Cultures (WAC) course examines artworks and cultural objects from a wide range of societies in order to explore questions of cultural identity, historical context and artistic expression. The syllabus introduces students to diverse traditions and periods such as from the Kingdom of Benin and Indigenous cultures of the Pacific Northwest to Tokugawa Japan, the Amarna period in ancient Egypt, early Indian sculpture, the European avant-garde, and ceramic traditions such as Iznik and Ming porcelain. These varieties encourage students to have comparative perspectives across cultures and time periods. Field-based learning also forms an important component of the course. For example, annually students undertake study visits to spend several days in Rome examining artworks discussed in class, including works in the Vatican Museums and other historical locations, as part of their contextual analysis of artistic traditions.

The college offers physical activities that take advantage of the school's location on the coast of the Adriatic Sea and close to the Alps, including cross-country and alpine skiing, hiking, kayaking, caving, and sailing. The creative activities program includes drama, art, pottery, choir, and photography. Extracurricular life at UWC Adriatic forms a structured part of the educational programme. According to institutional reports, the 2024 - 2025 academic year includes approximately 37 weeks of school activities, during which students participate in around 75 co-curricular activities and 33 community service initiatives, organised through a network of student-led councils and clubs. These student-led councils address a range of themes including finance and entrepreneurship, health and wellbeing, peace dialogue, gender equality and LGBTQ+ rights, political debate, environmental sustainability, cultural inclusion, philosophy, and student wellbeing.

In 2024–25 the college launched an “Impact Programme”, designed to help students develop project ideas in areas such as entrepreneurship, social leadership, sustainability, disability support, peer learning, and digital innovation, with mentoring from alumni, staff, and community members. The college also hosts lectures, themed events, and academic partnerships intended to connect classroom learning with contemporary public issues. These include the Orizzonti lecture series which invites alumni, scholars and professionals to discuss major contemporary issues, annual MUN conference, TEDxUWCAdriatic events, summer internships with research institutions in Trieste, and participation in the Jean Monnet Erasmus+ project, through which students have engaged with topics such as European institutions, migration, labour rights, and sustainability.

Students participated in the “Building a Healthy Ecosystem” programme, a two-year project developed with AstraZeneca Italy to promote mental and physical wellbeing in line with the World Health Organization’s Health-Promoting Schools model. Students also take part in financial literacy and investment education through the UWC Investment Club, which includes seminars, case studies and guest lectures by alumni and professionals; in 2025, participants visited Ferrari’s headquarters in Maranello to study corporate sustainability strategies and innovation in business.

Outdoor and cultural education are also described as integral elements of student life. This includes camping, hiking, caving, and route-based expeditions in the surrounding region, while cultural learning includes Italian language immersion, host-family initiatives, cultural weeks, and organised study trips in different cities in Italy such as Venice, Padua, Verona, and Rome.

The arts likewise occupy a prominent place in the college’s educational philosophy, although UWC Adriatic is not an arts college, artistic practice plays an important role in student life. Students participate in a wide range of artistic activities including music, theatre, visual arts, film, poetry and dance, often through student-led performances, exhibitions and productions that emphasize creative exploration and collaboration as part of the broader educational experience. The college hosted 18 musical performances while approximately 72 students participated in music activities and courses, five theatre performances and five visual arts exhibitions, including the International Baccalaureate visual arts final exhibition.

== Other ==
Students at the college are eligible, after graduation, to participate in the Shelby Davis Scholarship program, which funds undergraduate study, based on need, for UWC students at over 90 universities in the United States, including most Ivy League universities.

The Class of 2025 consisted of 93 students who continued their studies at 49 universities worldwide, with approximately 29% enrolling at universities in Europe, 55% outside Europe, and about 16% taking a gap year before further study. Among the universities attended by graduates are institutions such as Sciences Po, Bard College Berlin, University of Toronto, Trinity College Dublin, University of Oslo, University of Ljubljana, Hult International Business School, Brown University, Yale University, Leiden University, Politecnico di Milano, and Keio University.

Princess Ariane of the Netherlands attended the college from 2023 to 2025, graduating with the IB diploma. Her father, King Willem-Alexander, and older sister, Princess Alexia, both studied at the United World College of the Atlantic. The 2024 romantic drama film ''Before We Forget'', directed by and starring Juan Pablo Di Pace, is partly set at UWC Adriatic and is inspired by the director’s experiences as a student at the college in the late 1990s.

== Notable alumni ==
- Darren Huston (born 1966), Canadian businessman, CEO of the Priceline Group and booking.com.
- Marina Catena (born 1968), Italian UN official.
- Chrystia Freeland (born 1968) former Deputy Prime Minister of Canada and Liberal MP.
- Karen Mok (born 1970), Hong Kong singer.
- Orsola De Marco (born 1971), Italian, American, Australian astrophysicist and academic.
- Ghil'ad Zuckermann (born 1971), Israeli linguist and academic.
- Jason Y. Ng, Hong Kong-Canadian author and activist.
- Barbara Graziosi, Princeton professor of Classics.
- Guglielmo Verdirame (born 1974), Italian Lawyer and Professor of International Law at King's College London
- Joseph Pearson (writer) (born 1975), Canadian/Italian author.
- Corinne Ellemeet (born 1976), Dutch politician, former member of the House of Representatives.
- Tara Sharma (born 1977), British-Indian actress.
- Juan Pablo Di Pace (born 1979), Argentinian actor.
- Lina Attalah (born 1983), Egyptian media figure and journalist.
- Massimo Dobrovic (born 1984), Istrian-Italian actor.
- Sophie Hawley-Weld (born 1992), German singer, part of Sofi Tukker.
- Princess Ariane (born 2007), third daughter of the Dutch King Willem-Alexander.
