= Jorge Zorreguieta =

Argentine politician (1928–2017)

Minister of Agriculture, Livestock, and Fisheries
- In office March 1979 – March 1981
- President: Jorge Rafael Videla
- Preceded by: Mario Cadenas Madariaga
- Succeeded by: Jorge Aguado (as Minister of Agriculture)

Personal details
- Born: Jorge Horacio Zorreguieta Stefanini; 28 January 1928 Larroque, Argentina
- Died: 8 August 2017 (aged 89) Buenos Aires, Argentina
- Spouses: Marta López Gil (divorced); María del Carmen Cerruti Carricart
- Children: 7, including Maxima, Queen of the Netherlands

Jorge Horacio Zorreguieta Stefanini (28 January 1928 – 8 August 2017) was an Argentine politician who served as Secretary of Agriculture in the regime of General Jorge Rafael Videla. Zorreguieta was the father of Queen Máxima of the Netherlands.

== Early life ==
Jorge Zorreguieta was born in 1928 in Buenos Aires, the son of Cesina María Stefanini Borella and Juan Antonio Zorreguieta Bonorino. He was of Spanish-Basque and Italian ancestry. His paternal grandfather, Amadeo Zorreguieta Hernández, was mayor of the city of Mendoza. He became secretary of the Sociedad Rural Argentina, a conservative interest group of landowners and ranchers. He was also president of the association Juan de Garay, a cultural institution of the Basque community.

== Secretary of Agriculture ==
After the 1976 Argentine coup d'état of General Videla, Zorreguieta became Deputy Secretary of Agriculture. From March 1979 until March 1981 he was Secretary of Agriculture and Livestock. He was preceded by Mario Cadenas Madariaga, and succeeded by Jorge Aguado as Minister of Agriculture and Livestock.

The INTA, a research institute associated with Zorreguieta's ministry was put under the control of the Argentine Navy after the Videla-Coup. Employees from this institute disappeared during Zorreguieta's tenure.

== Advisor and director ==
In 1981, Zorreguieta stepped down as minister. He became president of the Centro Argentino Azucarero (CAA), an advisory body for sugar producers in Argentina. In April 1982 Argentina went to war with the United Kingdom over the Falkland Islands. Argentina was defeated, and the military government, now headed by Leopoldo Galtieri, collapsed. People who had been ministers under the military government were prosecuted for violations of human rights; Zorreguieta, who had left political office before the end, was not affected.

He also became chairman of the supervisory organization for food Coordinadora de la Industria de Productos Alimenticios (Copal).

== Personal life ==
=== Marriages and children ===
Zorreguieta married Marta López Gil (born 1935) in 1956. They later divorced. They had three daughters: María, Dolores, and Ángeles.

He married again, to María del Carmen Cerruti Carricart (born 8 September 1944), daughter of Dr. Jorge Horacio Cerruti de Sautu and María del Carmen Carricart Cieza, on 27 May 1970 in Paraguay. They had four children, including Máxima Zorreguieta Cerruti (born 17 May 1971), married in 2002 to King (then Prince) Willem-Alexander of the Netherlands, and Inés Zorreguieta Cerruti, who died by suicide.

=== Scandal in the Netherlands ===
Coat of arms of the Zorreguita family sui generis

The news of Prince Willem-Alexander's relationship and eventual marriage plans to Máxima Zorreguieta caused controversy in the Netherlands. Máxima's father had been the Minister of Agriculture during the regime of former Argentine President Videla, a military dictator who ruled Argentina from 1976 to 1981 and who was responsible for many atrocities against civilians (An estimated 30000-40000 people were kidnapped and murdered during this and subsequent military regimes before democracy was restored to Argentina in 1983). Jorge Zorreguieta had resigned one year before the end of the Videla regime and claimed that, as a civilian, he was unaware of the Dirty War while he was a cabinet minister. Professor Michiel Baud, who on request of the Dutch Parliament carried out an inquiry on the involvement of Zorreguieta, concluded that it would have been unlikely for a person in such a powerful position in the government to be unaware of the Dirty War. Despite finding Zorreguieta to be at fault, the marriage between his daughter Máxima and Prince Willem-Alexander was approved by parliament because Máxima herself had not done anything wrong; however Jorge Zorreguieta was not allowed to attend the 2002 wedding. Parliament's approval was necessary for Willem-Alexander to stay in line to the Dutch throne.

=== Visiting the Netherlands ===
Because of his past, Zorreguieta was not allowed to attend Máxima's wedding. However, he and his wife were invited to attend the christening of their granddaughters, the princesses Catharina-Amalia, Alexia, and Ariane. The difference was that the marriage of the heir apparent was seen as a state matter, and a baptism is considered a private matter. During the baptism ceremonies (in The Hague and Wassenaar), opponents of the former Argentine military regime protested. Zorreguieta was not present at the investiture of his son-in-law Willem-Alexander as King of the Netherlands on 30 April 2013 in Amsterdam.

== Death ==
Zorreguieta died of non-Hodgkin lymphoma at the age of 89, on 8 August 2017. He was survived by his second wife and seven children.
