= Inauguration of Willem-Alexander =

2013 inauguration of the Dutch monarch

Coordinates: 52.3739°N 4.8918°E

Inauguration of King Willem-Alexander
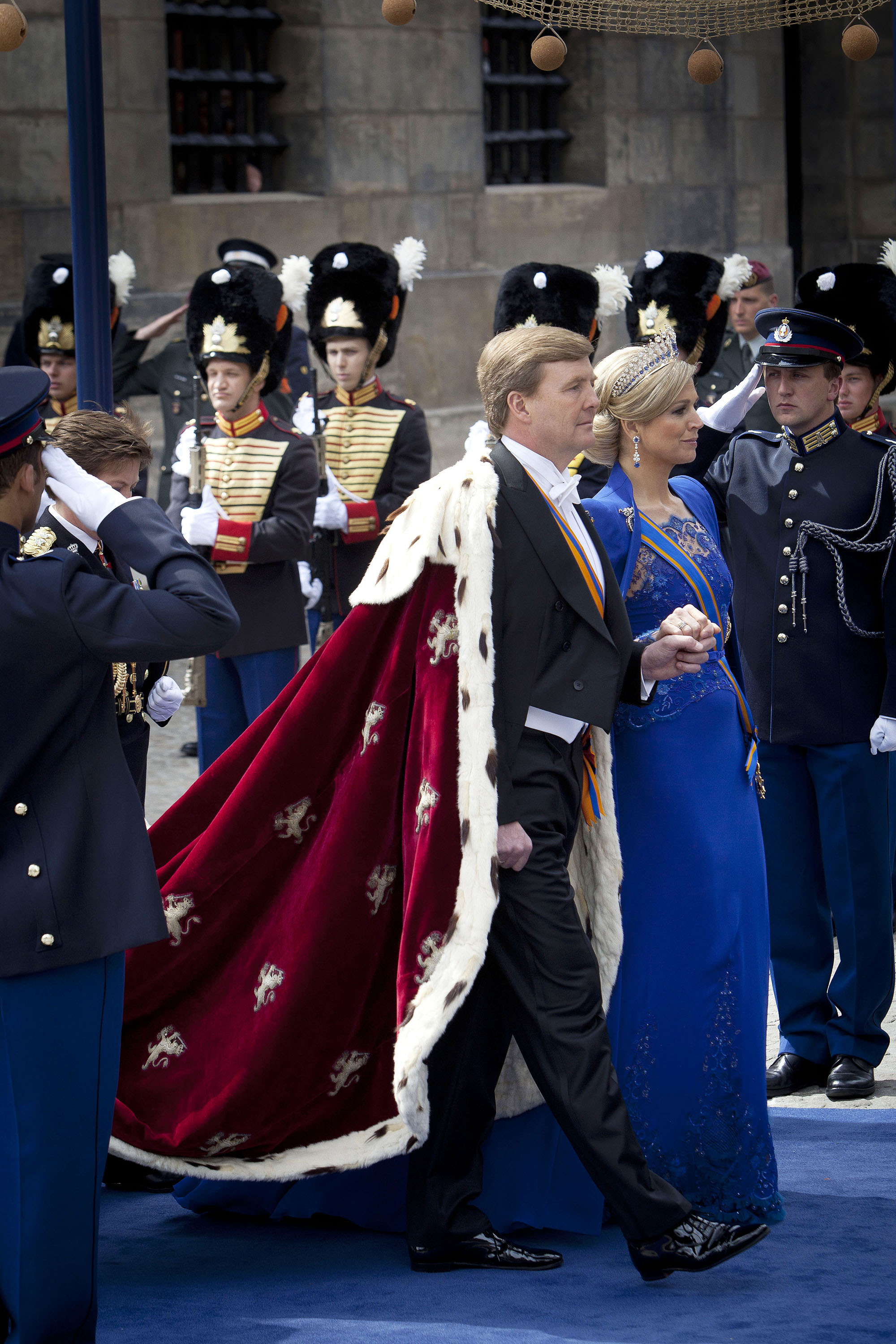
- King Willem-Alexander en route to his inauguration
- Date: 30 April 2013
- Location: Amsterdam, Netherlands
- Participants: King Willem-Alexander; States General; Dutch Armed Forces; King of Arms; Officer of Arms

The inauguration of Willem-Alexander took place on 30 April 2013 at the Nieuwe Kerk in Amsterdam. Willem-Alexander ascended the throne immediately following the abdication of his mother Queen Beatrix earlier that day. Willem-Alexander is the first King of the Netherlands since the death of his great-great-grandfather William III in 1890.

== Background ==
Following a reign of 33 years which began with the abdication of her mother Queen Juliana in 1980, Queen Beatrix, in a televised speech to the nation on 28 January 2013, announced her intent to abdicate the throne in favour of her eldest child, Willem-Alexander, in accordance with the tradition of Dutch monarchs.

On 17 April 2013, Willem-Alexander revealed in an interview that Queen Beatrix had previously informed Prime Minister Mark Rutte of her intention to abdicate the throne, which initiated talks on how and when to do this.

== Preparations ==
Preparations for this special session of the States General were made by officials of the Senate of the Netherlands. Music for the occasion was performed by the New Amsterdam Children's Choir and the Matangi Quartet.

== Abdication ==
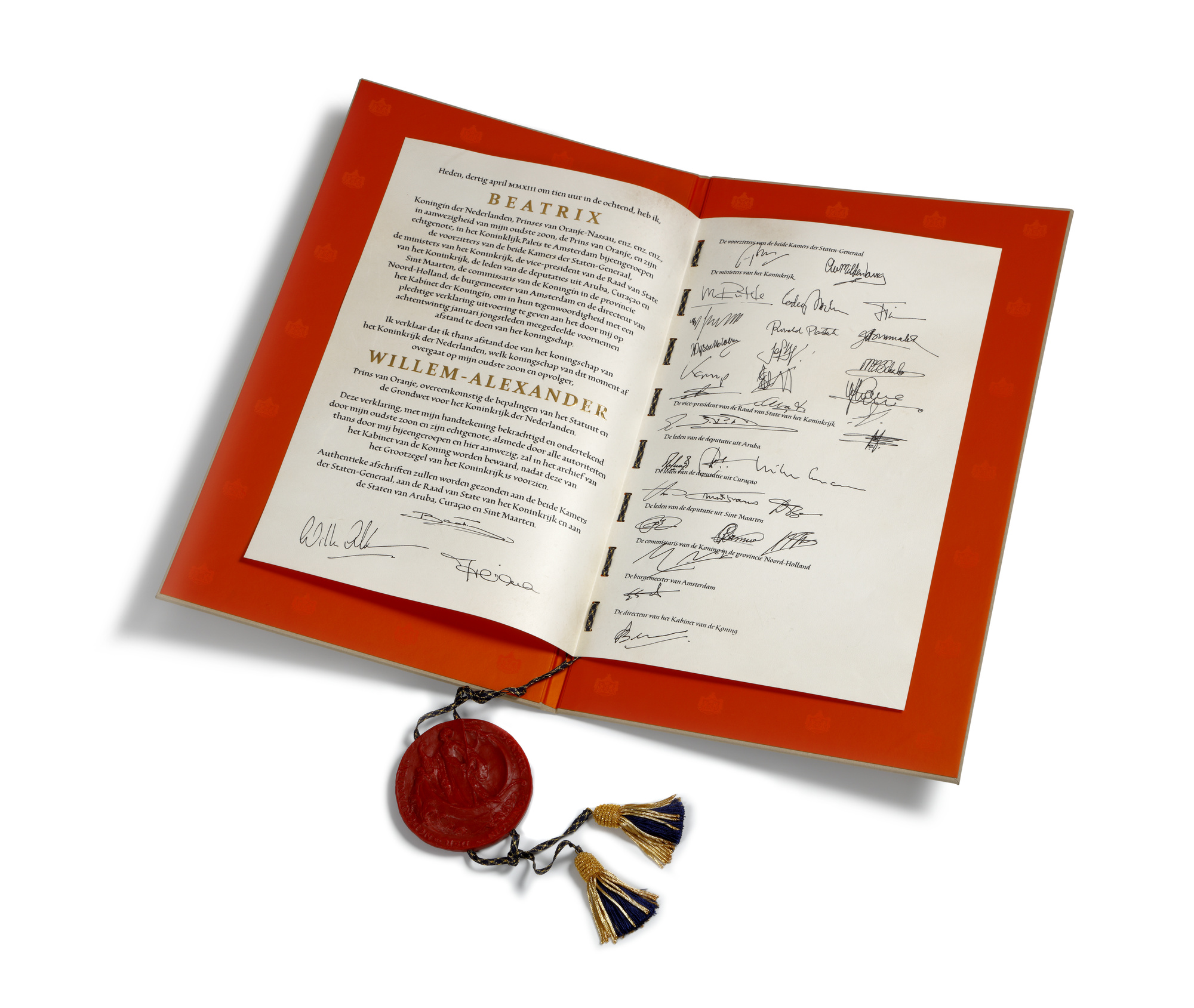
Instrument of abdication

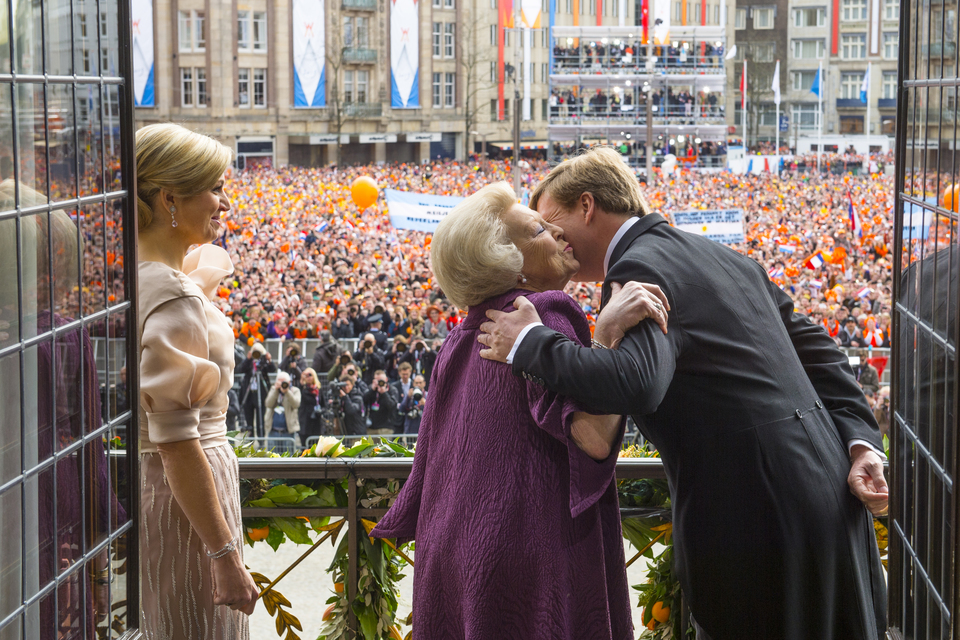
Willem-Alexander and Beatrix on the balcony of the Royal Palace, following the latter's abdication

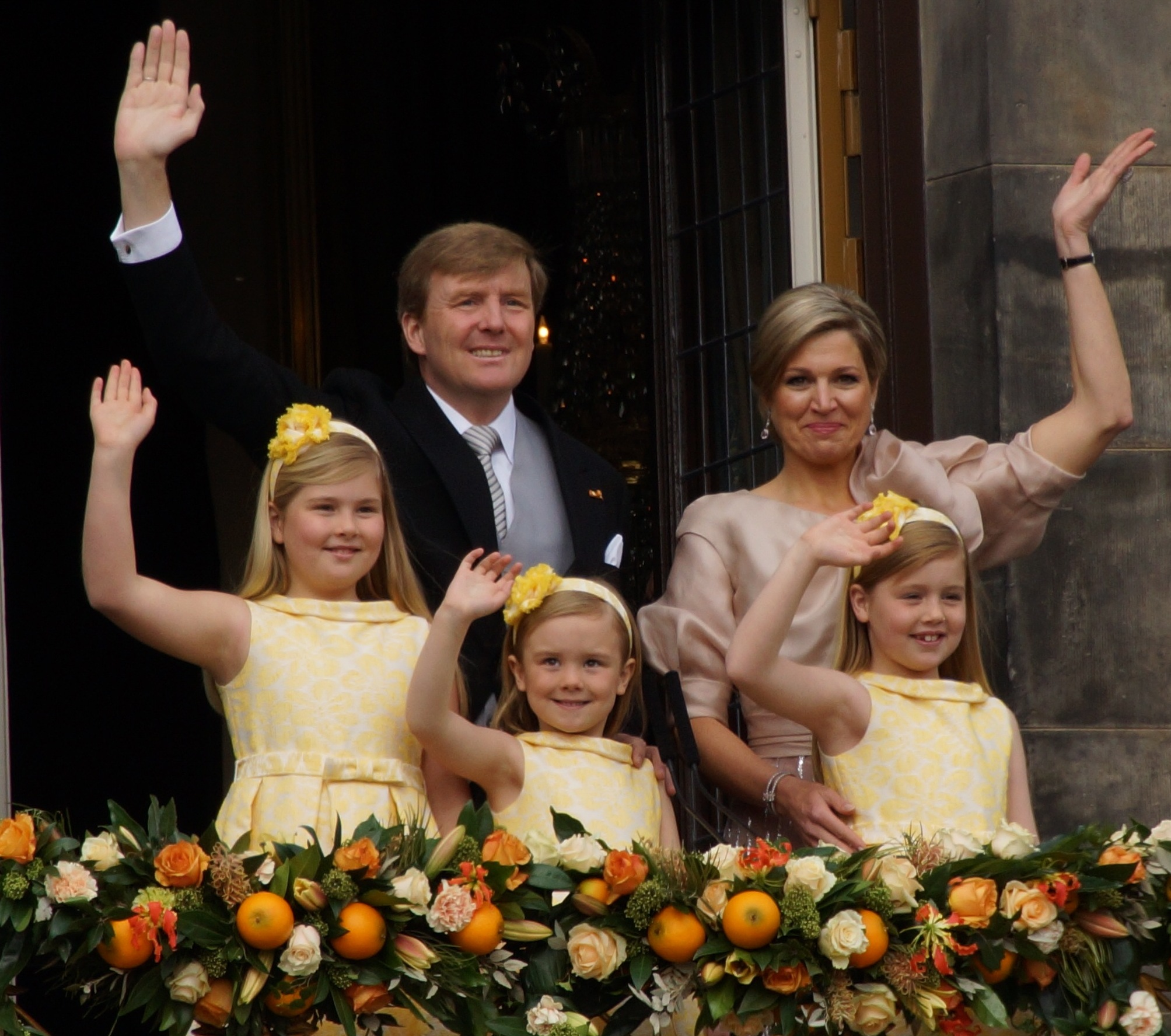
The King and Queen and their children

The abdication ceremony took place in the Mozeszaal of the Royal Palace in Amsterdam. Following a speech, Beatrix signed the Instrument of Abdication and for a few seconds, the throne was vacant until Willem-Alexander signed it moments later making him king. The document was then signed by Queen Máxima and the following:

- Chairman of the House of Representatives
- Chairman of the Senate
- Cabinet of the Netherlands
- The prime ministers of Aruba, Curaçao, Sint Maarten & the Netherlands
- The Vice-president of the Council of State
- The King's Commissioner of North Holland
- The Mayor of Amsterdam
- The King's Cabinet Director

Following a speech by the Cabinet Director, the new Royal standard was raised over the royal palace.

With the signing of the Instrument of Abdication, a number of titles previously held by Queen Beatrix (excluding those of Princess of Lippe-Biesterfeld and Princess of Orange-Nassau) were bestowed upon Willem-Alexander. In addition, Maxima, as the spouse of the Dutch monarch, became Queen Consort.

Finally, per tradition, Beatrix and King Willem-Alexander together with Queen Maxima, appeared on the balcony of the Royal Palace with the former monarch announcing to those gathered and watching, her son's ascension as the new monarch. The new king then gave a short speech, thanking his mother for her years of service. With the playing of the national anthem (Wilhelmus), Beatrix left the balcony, making way for the royal couple's children to symbolise the transition of the Royal House.

== Event ==
=== Procession ===
En route from the Royal Palace to the Nieuwe Kerk, the king was led by a delegation to the Nieuwe Kerk. The delegation consisted of aides carrying both the Charter and Constitution which were placed on the credence table in the front of the throne,

Delegation:

- King of arms: ex-Chief of Defence retired-general Peter van Uhm
- King of arms: astronaut André Kuipers
- Officer of arms: Robbert Dijkgraaf, former president of the Royal Netherlands Academy of Arts and Sciences
- Officer of arms: Anky van Grunsven
- Officer of arms: secretary-general Renee Jones-Bos of the Ministry of Foreign Affairs
- Jaime Saleh, carrying the Charter
- Herman Tjeenk Willink, carrying the Constitution

then came the Sword of state that represents the King's authority; carried by the then Chief of Defence General Tom Middendorp, the gonfalon of state, a white banner bearing the 1815 coat of arms of the Netherlands symbolizing the Kingdom of the Netherlands; was carried by the Inspector-General of the Dutch Armed Forces, Air Force general Tom van Ede.

== Guests ==
=== Dutch royal house ===
- The Princess of Orange, the King and Queen's daughter
- Princess Alexia, the King and Queen's daughter
- Princess Ariane, the King and Queen's daughter
- Princess Beatrix, the King's mother
  - Princess Mabel, the King's sister-in-law
  - Prince Constantijn and Princess Laurentien, the King's brother and sister-in-law
- Princess Irene, the King's maternal aunt
  - The Duke and Duchess of Parma and Piacenza, the King's first cousin and his wife
  - The Countess of Colorno and Mr Tjalling ten Cate, the King's first cousin and her husband
  - The Count of Bardi, the King's first cousin
  - The Marchioness of Sala and Mr Albert Brenninkmeijer, the King's first cousin and her husband
- Princess Margriet and Pieter van Vollenhoven, the King's maternal aunt and uncle
  - Prince Maurits and Princess Marilène, the King's first cousin and his wife
  - Prince Bernhard and Princess Annette, the King's first cousin and his wife
  - Prince Pieter-Christiaan and Princess Anita, the King's first cousin and his wife
  - Prince Floris and Princess Aimée, the King's first cousin and his wife
- Princess Christina, the King's maternal aunt
  - Mr and Mrs Bernardo Guillermo, the King's first cousin and his wife
  - Mr Nicolás Guillermo, the King's first cousin
  - Miss Juliana Guillermo, the King's first cousin

=== Foreign royalty ===
- The Crown Prince of Bahrain (representing the King of Bahrain)
- (Belgium) The Duke and Duchess of Brabant (representing the King of the Belgians)
- The Crown Prince and Crown Princess of Brunei (representing the Sultan of Brunei)
- The Crown Prince and Crown Princess of Denmark (representing the Queen of Denmark)
- The Crown Prince and Crown Princess of Japan (representing the Emperor of Japan)
- Prince Hassan bin Talal and Princess Sarvath al-Hassan of Jordan (representing the King of the Hashemite Kingdom of Jordan)
- The Hereditary Prince and Hereditary Princess of Liechtenstein (representing the Prince of Liechtenstein)
- The Hereditary Grand Duke and Hereditary Grand Duchess of Luxembourg (representing the Grand Duke of Luxembourg)
- The Prince of Monaco
- The Princess Consort of Morocco (representing the King of Morocco)
- The Crown Prince and Crown Princess of Norway (representing the King of Norway)
- Sayyid Haitham bin Tariq Al Said (representing the Sultan of Oman)
- Sheikha Mozah bint Nasser Al-Missned of Qatar (representing the Emir of Qatar)
- The Prince and Princess of Asturias (representing the King of Spain)
- The Crown Princess of Sweden and the Duke of Västergötland (representing the King of Sweden)
- The Crown Prince of Thailand (representing the King of Thailand)
  - Princess Maha Chakri Sirindhorn of Thailand
- Sheikh Hamed bin Zayed Al Nahyan (representing the Emir of Abu Dhabi and President of the United Arab Emirates)
- The Prince of Wales and the Duchess of Cornwall (representing the Queen of the United Kingdom)

=== Other dignitaries ===
- The Rt. Hon. David Johnston, Governor General of Canada, and Mrs Johnston
- (Germany) The Hon Dr Rita Süssmuth, former President of the Bundestag, and Professor Hans Süssmuth
- Ali Babacan, Deputy Prime Minister of Turkey, and Mrs Babacan
- (European Union) Herman Van Rompuy, President of the European Council
- (European Union) José Manuel Barroso, President of the European Commission, and Mrs Barroso
- (European Union) Martin Schulz, President of the European Parliament
- The Count Rogge, President of the International Olympic Committee, and The Countess Rogge
- Kofi Annan, former Secretary-General of the United Nations, and Mrs Annan
- Helen Clark, United Nations Development Programme Administrator

== Inauguration ==
The inauguration of Willem-Alexander as King of the Netherlands took place during a special session of the States General of the Netherlands in the Nieuwe Kerk. During the inauguration ceremony, Willem-Alexander took his oath of office and swore to uphold the Charter of the Kingdom of the Netherlands and the Constitution of the Netherlands. Following Willem-Alexander's swearing in, the members of the States General were duly sworn, to uphold the king to his oath.

For the ceremony the King chose to don underneath the royal mantle evening dress as opposed to a military uniform. He wore as Grand Master the sash and badge of the Military Order of William, and wore as grand master of all national/dynastic orders their decorations in miniature form.

The throne consisted out of two luxurious chairs from Het Loo Palace that were a gift to Queen Wilhelmina from the residents of Amsterdam. The original intent was to use the same chairs that were used during the inauguration of the Queen Beatrix in 1980. It soon came be apparent, however, that this would be impossible as the chairs were too low to be seated in comfortably.

On the credence table lay the three representations of the Kingdom. The Regalia of the Netherlands lay next to the Constitution. The crown symbolized the monarch's sovereignty and dignity, the royal scepter symbolizing the monarch's authority, the orb symbolizing the dominions upon which he reigns and the constitution symbolizing the constitutional monarchy.

Arriving at the Nieuwe Kerk, the royal couple was escorted by a special delegation that included the Chairwoman of the House of Representatives, four members of the States General and the Chamberlain of the senate to their seats.

That same day, which also happened to be Queen's Day as well, Armin van Buuren was the headline act in a performance to a live audience celebrating the King's crowning in Amsterdam. While he was performing live together with the Royal Concertgebouw Orchestra in the Amsterdam Harbor on Java-eiland, King Willem-Alexander, Queen Máxima and their three daughters made an unplanned visit on stage.
