= Catharina-Amalia, Princess of Orange =

Heir apparent to the Dutch throne (born 2003)

Catharina-Amalia
- Princess of Orange
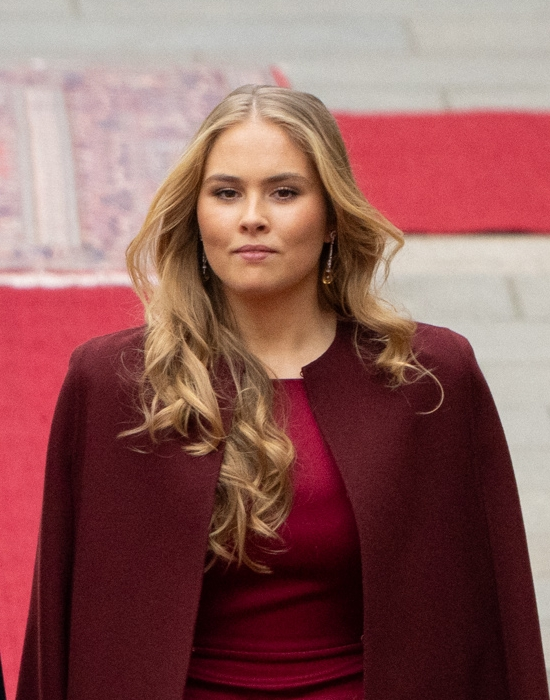
- Catharina-Amalia in 2025
- Born: 7 December 2003 (age 22); The Hague, Netherlands
Names
- Catharina-Amalia Beatrix Carmen Victoria
- House: Orange-Nassau (official); Amsberg (agnatic)
- Father: Willem-Alexander of the Netherlands
- Mother: Máxima Zorreguieta
- Religion: Protestant (Note: Specifically, a member of the Protestant Church in the Netherlands.)
- Education: University of Amsterdam; IE Business School

Catharina-Amalia, Princess of Orange (Dutch pronunciation: [kaːtaːˈrinaː ʔaːˈmaːlijaː]; Catharina-Amalia Beatrix Carmen Victoria; born 7 December 2003) is the heir apparent to the throne of the Kingdom of the Netherlands, which consists of the constituent countries of Aruba, Curaçao, the Netherlands, and Sint Maarten.

Catharina-Amalia is the eldest child of King Willem-Alexander and Queen Máxima. She has two younger sisters, Princess Alexia and Princess Ariane. She became heir apparent when her father ascended the throne on 30 April 2013.

== Early life ==
Princess Catharina-Amalia Beatrix Carmen Victoria of the Netherlands was born at 17:01 CET on 7 December 2003 in the HMC Bronovo in The Hague, the first child of the then Willem-Alexander, Prince of Orange (now king) and Princess Máxima. Upon the public announcement of her birth, 101 salute shots were fired at four places in the Kingdom of the Netherlands: Den Helder and The Hague in the Netherlands, Willemstad in Curaçao, and Oranjestad in Aruba.

On 12 June 2004, Catharina-Amalia was baptised by the Rev. Carel ter Linden in the Great Church in The Hague. Her godparents are her uncle Prince Constantijn, Crown Princess Victoria of Sweden, the (then) vice-president of the Council of State of the Netherlands Herman Tjeenk Willink, her mother's friend Samantha Deane, her uncle Martín Zorreguieta, and her father's friend Marc ter Haar. Catharina-Amalia's maternal grandparents, Jorge Zorreguieta and María del Carmen Cerruti, were prohibited from attending her parents' wedding in 2002 due to Zorreguieta's involvement in the regime of General Jorge Rafael Videla, but were present at her baptism, which was a private rather than a state affair.

Princess Catharina-Amalia has two younger sisters: Princess Alexia (born in 2005) and Princess Ariane (born in 2007). The family spent the princesses' formative years at Villa Eikenhorst on the De Horsten estate in Wassenaar. In 2019 they moved to Huis ten Bosch Palace in The Hague.

Her birthdays are traditionally celebrated with a concert at the Kloosterkerk in The Hague, which is attended by ambassadors and members of the royal household and the Council of State of the Netherlands. Catharina-Amalia's paternal grandmother, Queen Beatrix, abdicated on 30 April 2013 and her father ascended the throne. Catharina-Amalia, as the new heir apparent, assumed the title of Princess of Orange, becoming the first to do so in her own right.

== Education ==
In December 2007, Catharina-Amalia began her education at Bloemcamp Primary School, a public primary school in Wassenaar. After finishing primary education, she attended the Christelijk Gymnasium Sorghvliet in The Hague, where her aunt Princess Laurentien attended. She participated in the student council and attended both the Model United Nations of the International School of The Hague and The Hague International Model United Nations conferences. She graduated in 2021 with distinction. After completing her studies at Sorghvliet, Catharina-Amalia took a gap year, during which she interned at the Orange Fund and volunteered at other organisations.

Catharina-Amalia studied at the University of Amsterdam for a Bachelor of Science degree in Politics, Psychology, Law and Economics (PPLE). During her second month in university, she was moved back to the royal palace from her student housing in Amsterdam due to security risks. In April 2024, King Willem-Alexander revealed that Catharina-Amalia lived in Madrid in 2023 under the protection of the Spanish monarchy, while she continued her studies online, due to the threats from the Moroccan mafia, a criminal organization dedicated to drug trafficking that has been threatening to kidnap her. In August 2024, the Dutch Broadcasting Foundation announced that Catharina-Amalia joined the Amsterdam corps, a Dutch student association. In July 2025, Catharina-Amalia earned a certificate of attendance from the PPLE College at the University of Amsterdam, with her Bachelor of Science degree in PPLE set to be given at a later date as she was unable to complete a course due to an injury sustained while horse riding. She is set to participate in the Defensity College training program at the University of Amsterdam for two academic years to earn a bachelor's degree in Dutch Law.

Catharina-Amalia speaks Dutch, English, and Spanish (her mother's first language). Additionally, she took classes in Mandarin Chinese.

== Public life ==
Catharina-Amalia and her sisters attended the annual Koningsdag. On 19 June 2010, Catharina-Amalia served as a bridesmaid at the wedding of Crown Princess Victoria of Sweden and Daniel Westling. On the occasion of her 18th birthday in 2021, a biography of Catharina-Amalia was published. Similar books were published on the 18th birthday of Princess Beatrix in 1956 and Prince Willem-Alexander in 1985. The book titled "Amalia" is written by Dutch entertainer Claudia de Breij. On 8 December 2021, Catharina-Amalia assumed her seat in the Advisory Division of the Council of State when she reached the age of majority at 18 the day before. On the same day, she gave her first public speech at the Council of State meeting in Kneuterdijk Palace. An outdoor birthday party thrown by her family to mark the occasion was found to be in breach of regulations and restrictions imposed during the COVID-19 pandemic, which made her father admit that "it was not right to organize this".

On 17 June 2022, together with her parents, she was among the royal guests invited to the celebrations of the 18th birthday of Princess Ingrid Alexandra of Norway. This was Catharina-Amalia's first public engagement outside of the Netherlands and the first occasion to which she was allowed to wear a tiara. On 20 September 2022, together with her parents, Catharina-Amalia attended Prinsjesdag, where the King addressed a joint session of the States General of the Netherlands to outline government policy for the upcoming parliamentary session. In November 2022, Catharina-Amalia and her family visited an exhibition at Nieuwe Kerk dedicated to Queen Juliana. In December 2022, she visited the three branches of Dutch military: Air Force, Army and Navy.

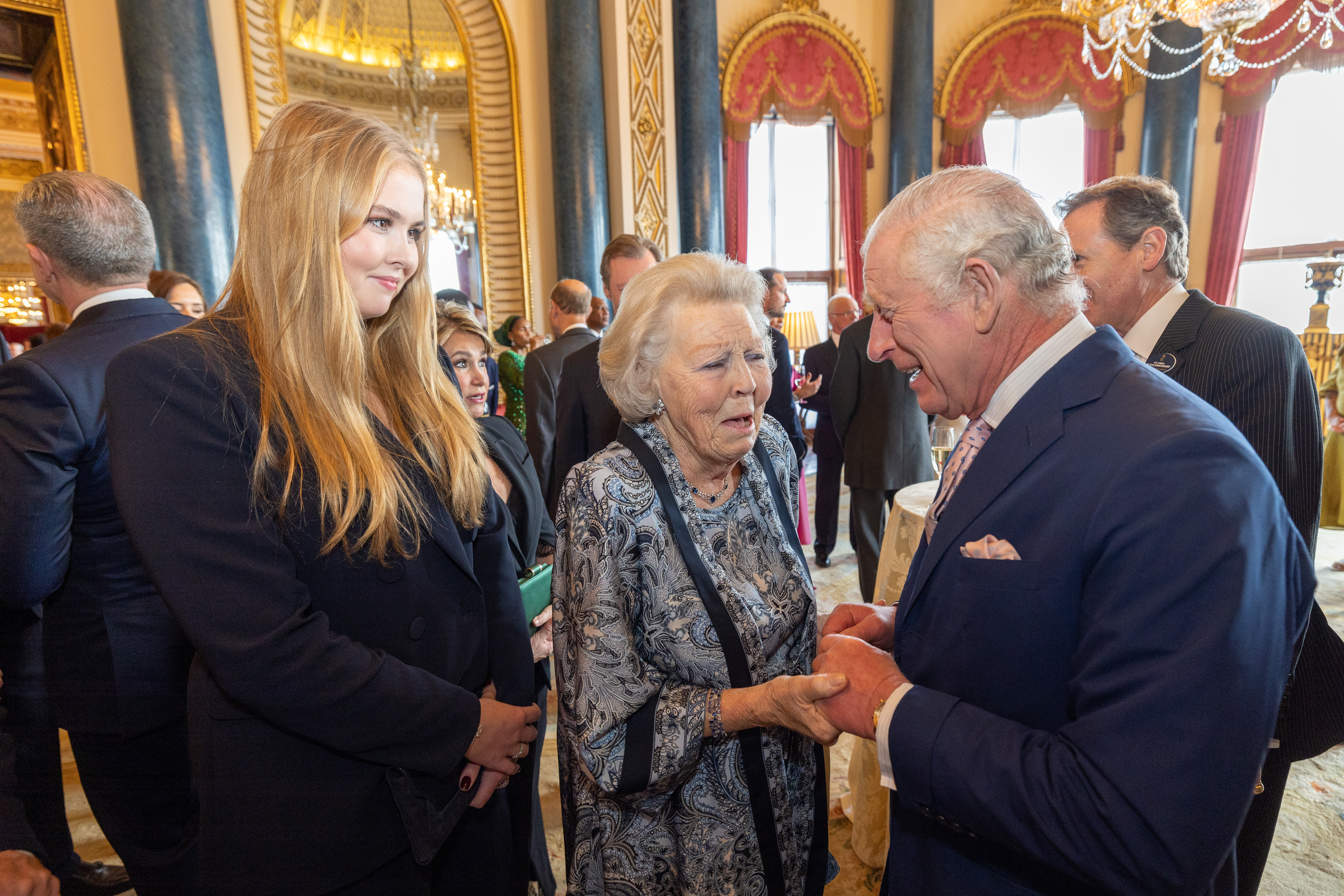
Catharina-Amalia and Beatrix meeting with King Charles III ahead of his coronation in May 2023

In January and February 2023, Catharina-Amalia went on a tour of the Dutch Caribbean with her parents. They visited Aruba, Curaçao, Sint Maarten, Bonaire, Sint Eustatius, and Saba. It was her first official royal tour. In April 2023, Catharina-Amalia and her sister Princess Ariane attended King's Day concert in Rotterdam. On 5 May 2023, she accompanied her grandmother to a reception held at Buckingham Palace the evening before the coronation of King Charles III and Queen Camilla of the United Kingdom. In June 2023, she and her parents attended a state banquet honoring the wedding of Crown Prince Hussein of Jordan and Rajwa Al Saif. She carried her first solo official trip abroad in October 2023 by attending Prince Christian of Denmark's 18th birthday celebration banquet at Christiansborg Palace, Denmark. Catharina-Amalia attended her first state banquet, honouring King Felipe VI and Queen Letizia of Spain, in April 2024.

In June 2025, Catharina-Amalia underwent surgery after falling from a horse and fracturing her arm.

=== Public image ===
Catharina-Amalia has experienced repeated fat shaming by tabloids and on social media since she was young, most notably by the Portuguese celebrity magazine Caras labeling her as plus size. In response to the body shaming, members of the public have expressed their support for the princess, calling the fat shaming against her unacceptable.

=== Annual allowance ===
Catharina-Amalia became entitled to an annual allowance from the Dutch state upon reaching the age of 18. This allowance consisted of two parts: a personal income component of €296,000 and a €1,338,000 allocation for staff and operational expenses by 2021 inflation rates. Following her high school graduation, Catharina-Amalia opted to decline the annual allowance until she completed her studies.

In May 2024, citing changed circumstances, Catharina-Amalia announced she would begin utilizing her annual allowance for staff and operational expenses, starting in January 2025, which with adjustments to inflation amounted to €1,500,000.

== Titles, styles, honours and arms ==
Catharina Amalia's monogram

=== Titles ===
- 7 December 2003 – 30 April 2013: Her Royal Highness Princess Catharina-Amalia of the Netherlands, Princess of Orange Nassau
- 30 April 2013 – present: Her Royal Highness The Princess of Orange

=== Honours ===
==== National ====
- Knight Grand Cross of the Order of the Lion of the Netherlands (7 December 2021).
- Knight of the Order of the Gold Lion of the House of Nassau (7 December 2021).

==== Foreign ====
- Finland: Grand Cross of the Order of the White Rose of Finland (11 December 2025)
- Germany: Grand Cross 1st class of the Order of Merit of the Federal Republic of Germany (9 June 2026)
- Japan: Grand Cordon of the Order of the Chrysanthemum (17 June 2026)
- Oman: Member 1st Class of the Order of the Renaissance (15 April 2025)
- Portugal: Grand Cross of the Military Order of Christ (10 December 2024)
- Spain: Dame Grand Cross of the Royal Order of Isabella the Catholic (10 April 2024)

=== Honorific eponyms ===
==== Geographic locations ====
- Netherlands: Princess Amalia Wind Farm in the offshore of IJmuiden, North Holland.

==== Structures ====
- Curaçao: Princess Amalia Bridge in Scharloo, Willemstad.

==== Other ====
- Netherlands: Prinses Amalia, a Douglas C-47 Skytrain once owned by her great-grandfather, Prince Bernhard of Lippe-Biesterfeld.
- Netherlands: Vox Amalia, a dredging vessel built by Dutch maritime contracting company Van Oord.
- Netherlands: Regiment Huzaren Prinses Catharina-Amalia, a regiment of the Royal Netherlands Army.
- Curaçao: Amalia Waltz, a dance music composed by John Nathan Suarez and presented to the Dutch Royal Family by Curaçaoan governor Lucille George-Wout.

=== Arms ===
Coat of arms of Catharina-Amalia, Princess of Orange
Notes This coat of arms is used by the Princess of Orange and her sisters, Princess Alexia and Princess Ariane. Escutcheon Quarterly: I and IV azure billety or, a lion with coronet also or armed and langued gules, holding in his dexter paw a sword argent hilted or, and in his sinister seven arrows argent pointed and bound together or, which is of the Kingdom of the Netherlands; II and III or, a horn azure opened and bound gules, which is of the first House of Orange; an inescutcheon or bearing a castle of three towers gules flanked on each side by a poplar tree au naturel, and a river azure flowing from the base, ondoyant to the gate of the castle, which is of the house of Zorreguieta in Argentina. Banner As Princess, Catharina-Amalia uses a swallow-tailed flag, with the Royal standard colours and her paternal arms (the horn of Orange) in the upper hoist and her maternal arms (the tower of Zorreguieta) in the lower hoist. The arms of the Netherlands (which originates from Nassau) without the insignia of the Order of Willem within an orange circle. Symbolism The first and fourth quarters are the coat of arms of the Netherlands, based on the coat of arms of the House of Nassau. The second and third quarters are the coat of arms of the Prince of Orange. In the center is the coat of arms of the Zorreguieta family.

== See also ==
- List of current heirs apparent

== Notes ==
Catharina-Amalia, Princess of Orange House of Orange-Nassau Born: 7 December 2003
Lines of succession
First Heir apparent	Succession to the Dutch throne 1st in line	Succeeded by Princess Alexia
Dutch royalty
Preceded by Willem-Alexander	Princess of Orange; 2013–present	Incumbent
