= Marina Catena =

Italian humanitarian

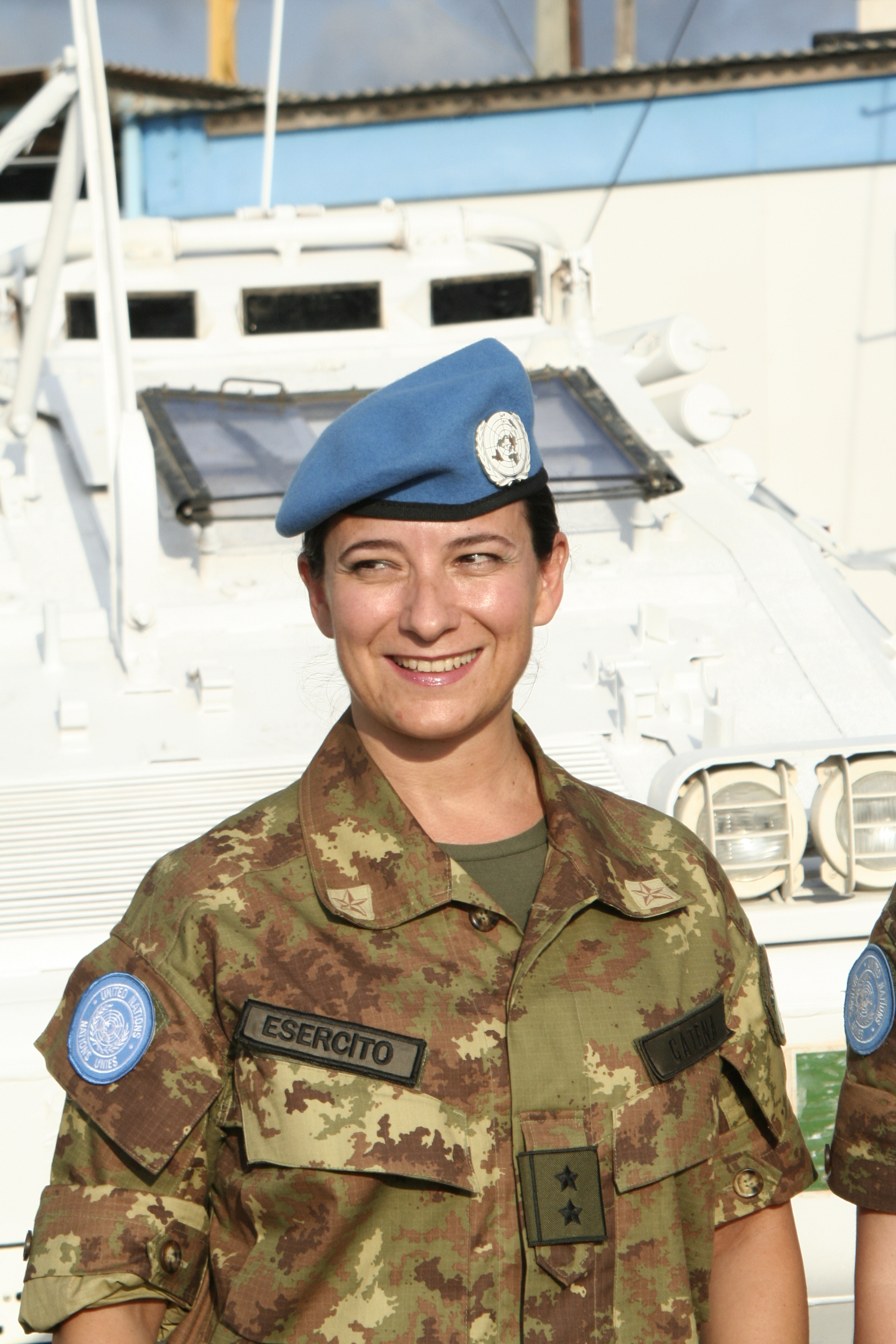
Lieutenant Marina Catena engaged in the peacekeeping operation UNIFIL in Lebanon

Marina Catena is an Italian humanitarian. She is a Director at United Nations World Food Programme. She served as the Director of the United Nations World Food Programme (Paris). She is Lieutenant in the Italian Army (Specialized Reserve) and a writer of several books/essays.

== Career ==
She obtained the International Baccalaureate at the United World College of the Adriatic, and attended the LUISS University in Rome, where she graduated in Political Sciences (International Relations) and the Institut d'études politiques (Strasbourg). She worked as a flight attendant for Air France.

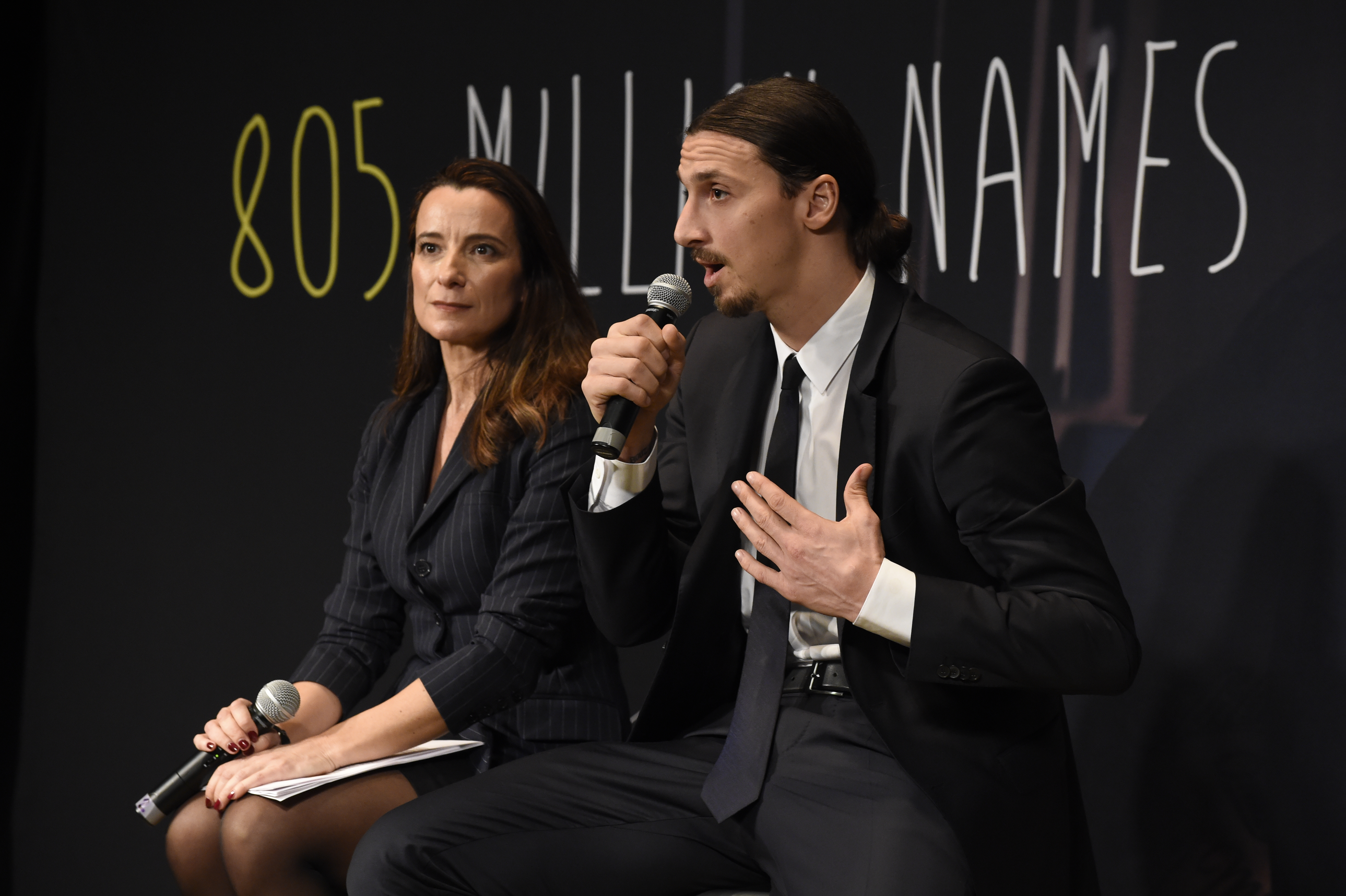
Maria Catena at the "805 million names" press conference with Zlatan Ibrahimovic

Since 1999, she is an official of the United Nations World Food Programme. She is the director of the United Nations World Food Program for France and Monaco, Paris. In 2015, she conceived, managed and launched the global awareness campaign "805 million names" with football star Zlatan Ibrahimović and ad agency Forsman & Bodenfors.

She was Special Advisor to Minister Bernard Kouchner, Special Representative of the Secretary General to Peace keeping operation in Kosovo UNMIK (1999-2001). She served as Special Advisor to Operation Iraqi Freedom in Iraq (2003). She served as United Nations Blue Helmet in UNIFIL Peace keeping Operation in Lebanon with Paratroopers Brigade "Folgore" (2007) and with Bersaglieri Brigade "Garibaldi" (2019). She served in Operazione Strade Sicure Esercito Italiano with Granatieri di Sardegna.

She was awarded Chevalier Ordre national du Mérite by President Nicolas Sarkozy (2009) and Cavaliere Ordine al Merito della Repubblica Italiana (2018).

== Writings ==
- Romanzo Militare: #Operazione Double Sierra (RUBBETTINO - 2018): a reality novel about the Strade Sicure anti-terrorism operation in the streets of Rome (2018).
- A woman soldier: diary of an Italian lieutenant in Lebanon (RIZZOLI - 2008). First book written in Italy by a woman-soldier on everyday life of soldiers in the front line.
- The train of Kosovo Polje (SELLERIO - 2003) for which she received the Award for Fiction The Country of Women.
- Essays on civil-military relations among them: "The role of female soldiers in peacekeeping missions" (Italian Air Force Magazine), "Women and the Labyrinth of Leadership" (Il Sole 24 ore - Harvard Business Review).
