= Morris Tabaksblat =

Dutch businessman (1937–2011)

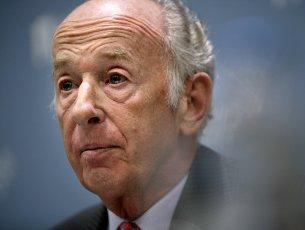
- Born: September 19, 1937; Rotterdam
- Died: October 20, 2011 (aged 74); Wassenaar
- Education: Leiden University
- Known for: Chairman of the Board of Directors at Unilever
- Awards: Knight of the Order of the Netherlands Lion (1995); Grand Officer of the Order of Orange-Nassau (1999); Honorary Knight Commander of the Order of the British Empire (KBE) (1999); Honorary doctorate, Nyenrode Business Universiteit (2008)

Morris Tabaksblat (19 September 1937, in Rotterdam – 20 October 2011, in Wassenaar), was a Dutch captain of industry. He was the CEO of Unilever and chairman of the Tabaksblat committee which drafted the Tabaksblat code.

== Education ==
Tabaksblat was educated at the Sorghvliet Gymnasium in The Hague, before studying law at Leiden University.

== Career at Unilever ==
Tabaksblat joined Unilever in 1964. During the first twenty years of his career at Unilever he had positions in marketing and sales in the Netherlands, Spain and Brazil. In 1984, he joined the boards of Unilever NV and Unilever PLC. He was responsible for marketing and the product group 'personal products'. Later he worked in New York City as regional director for North America. In 1994, he became chairman of the board of directors.

== Later career ==
In 1999 Tabaksbat left Unilever and became chairman of Reed Elsevier, a position he held until 2005.

Tabaksbat was also chairman of the War Trauma Foundation in Amstelveen and chairman of the councils of the university of Leiden and the Leiden University Medical Centre.

From 1999 until 2001, he was chairman of the European Round Table of Industrialists. In 2003 Morris Tabaksblat became chairman of the 'Tabaksblat committee' which drafted a corporate governance code, a code of conduct for remuneration of managers in the Netherlands.

Tabaksblat received a knighthood of the Order of the Netherlands Lion in 1995. In 1999 he was appointed honorary Knight Commander of the Most Excellent Order of the British Empire and in the same year he was also appointed Grand Officer in the Order of Oranje-Nassau.
