= Christelijk Gymnasium Sorghvliet =

Coordinates: 52°5′18″N 4°17′6″E

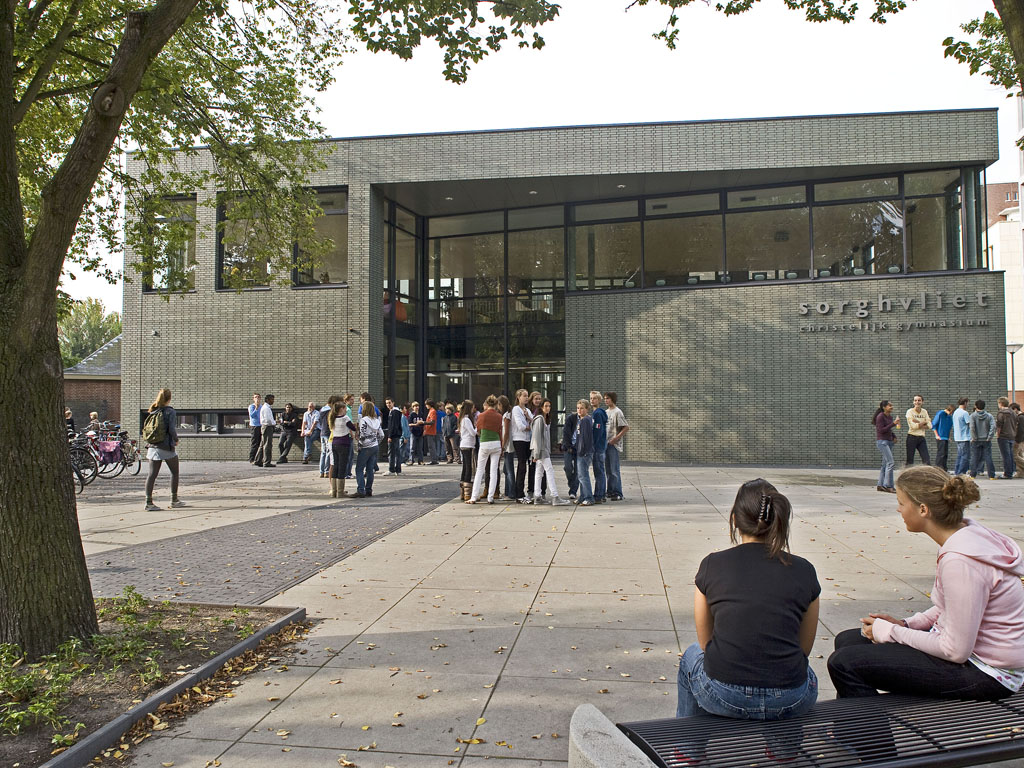
- The Hague, Netherlands

Information
- Type: Gymnasium
- Founded: 1908
- Headmaster: Swen Zuiderwijk
- Teaching staff: 56
- Enrollment: 730
- Website: www.gymnasium-sorghvliet.nl

The Christelijk Gymnasium Sorghvliet, commonly known simply as Sorghvliet, is an independent Protestant gymnasium in The Hague. Sorghvliet is consistently ranked among the best schools in the Netherlands by the influential magazine Elsevier. Sorghvliet has a long list of notable alumni, including multiple Dutch politicians, writers, athletes, entrepreneurs, members of the Dutch royal family, and scientists, including one Nobel laureate.

== Notable alumni ==
- Catharina-Amalia, Princess of Orange
- Princess Alexia of the Netherlands
- Princess Ariane of the Netherlands
- Jozias van Aartsen, VVD politician and former Mayor of The Hague
- Laurens Jan Brinkhorst, D66 politician and former Deputy Prime Minister
- Princess Laurentien of the Netherlands (née Brinkhorst)
- Bas de Gaay Fortman, former Senator
- Marnix van Rij, CDA politician and former Minister of Finance
- Morris Tabaksblat, CEO of Unilever
- Simon van der Meer, physicist and winner of the 1984 Nobel Prize in Physics
- F. Springer, pseudonym of Carel Jan Schneider, diplomat and writer
- Tomas Ross, pseudonym of Willem Pieter Hogendoorn, writer
