= Orsola De Marco =

Italian and Australian astrophysicist

Orsola De Marco is an Italian and Australian astrophysicist whose research concerns interacting binary stars and planetary nebulae. She is a professor in the School of Mathematical and Physical Sciences and Astrophysics and Space Technologies Research Centre at Macquarie University in Sydney.

== Research ==
Orsola De Marco
- Scientific career
- Fields: Astronomy
- Workplaces: ETH Zurich; University College London; American Museum of Natural History; Macquarie University
- Thesis: Cool Wolf-Rayet central stars and their planetary nebulae

De Marco's research on old stars concerns the formation of planetary nebulae, binary stars that become large and close enough for their envelopes to interact, post common envelope binaries, and the role of binary interactions in planetary nebulae.

She was the lead researcher for one of the first five images released from the James Webb Space Telescope, of the planetary nebula NGC 3132. She and her coauthors used this image to reconstruct the formation of this nebula from a nova, including the unexpected discovery of multiple companion stars that were involved in this event.

As well as studying these systems observationally, her work has also included the development of supercomputer simulations of colliding stars.

== Education and career ==
After attending the liceo scientifico in Bologna, De Marco attended the United World College of the Adriatic near Trieste, graduating with an International Baccalaureate Diploma. She then studied astrophysics at University College London in England, finishing with first class honours in 1994. She continued at University College London for a PhD jointly supervised by Michael J. Barlow and Peter Storey, which she completed in 1997, with the dissertation Cool Wolf-Rayet central stars and their planetary nebulae.

After postdoctoral research at ETH Zurich in Switzerland from 1997 to 1999, University College London from 1999 to 2000, and the American Museum of Natural History in the US from 2000 to 2009, she became an associate professor at Macquarie University in 2009. She was named as an ARC Future Fellow in 2013 and since 2015 has been full professor.

== Selected Publications ==
De Marco has contributed to over 120 referred publication as of November 2026. Significant publications amongst this list are:

- De Marco, Orsola. "The origin and shaping of planetary nebulae: putting the binary hypothesis to the test." Publications of the Astronomical Society of the Pacific 121.878 (2009): 316-342. https://doi.org/10.1086/597765.
- De Marco, Orsola, et al. "On the α formalism for the common envelope interaction." Monthly Notices of the Royal Astronomical Society 411.4 (2011): 2277-2292. https://doi.org/10.1111/j.1365-2966.2010.17891.x
- De Marco, Orsola, et al. "Indications of a large fraction of spectroscopic binaries among nuclei of planetary nebulae." The Astrophysical Journal Letters 602.2 (2004): L93-L96. https://doi.org/10.1086/382156

== Awards and Prizes ==
In October 2024 De Marco was awarded the Genio Vagante (Wandering Genius) award by the Institute of the Vittoriale Degli Italiani at a ceremony held in Curzon Hall in Greater Sydney and attended by the current director of the institute, Giordano Bruno Guerri. The prize is given to those Italians who have had a significant impact on the recognition of Italy, especially on an international level.
