= Princess Ariane of the Netherlands =

Dutch princess (born 2007)

Princess Ariane
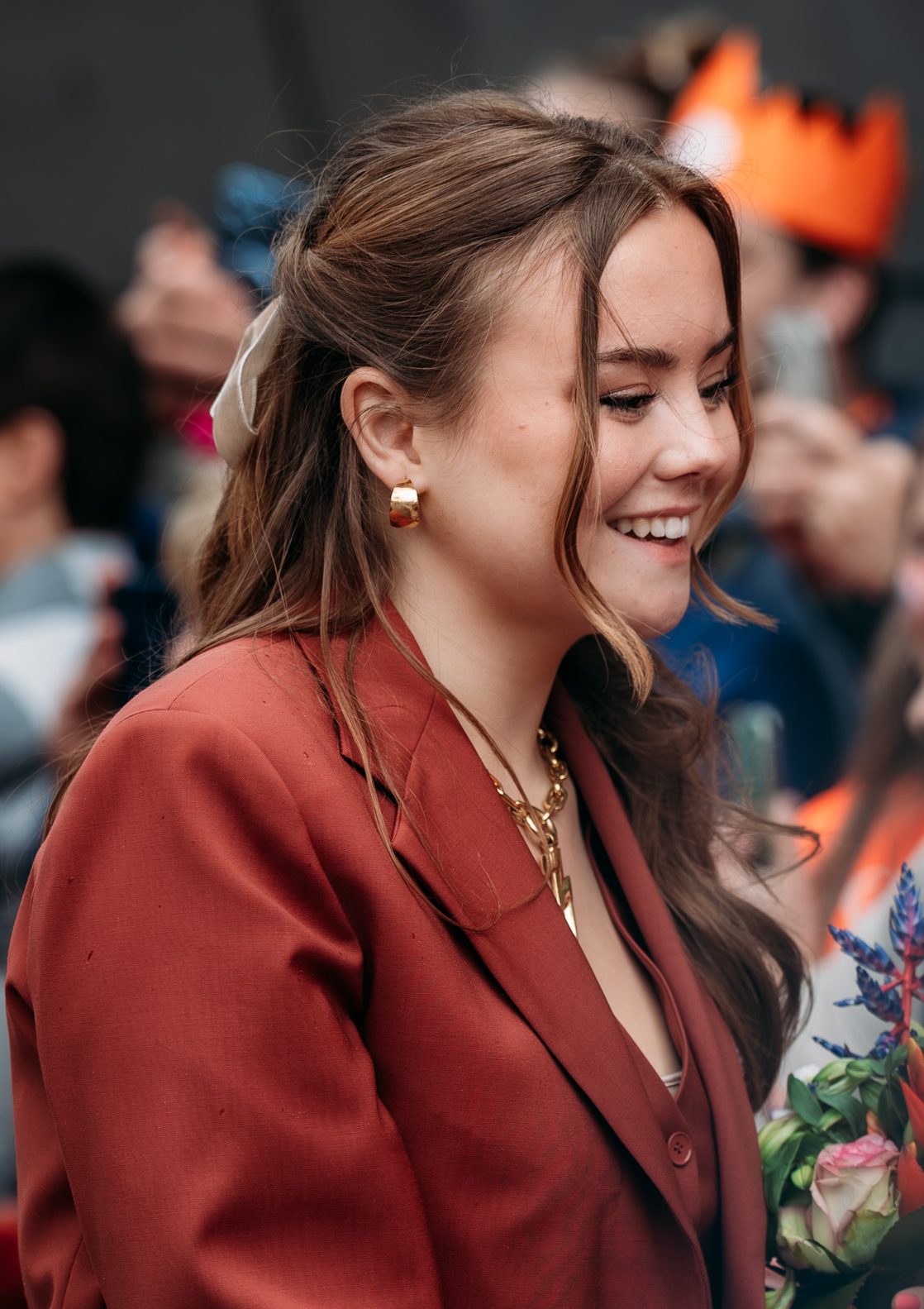
- Ariane in 2024
- Born: 10 April 2007 (age 19); The Hague, Netherlands
Names
- Ariane Wilhelmina Máxima Inés
- House: Orange-Nassau (official); Amsberg (agnatic)
- Father: Willem-Alexander of the Netherlands
- Mother: Máxima Zorreguieta
- Education: UWC Adriatic; Delft University of Technology

Princess Ariane of the Netherlands, Princess of Orange-Nassau (Ariane Wilhelmina Máxima Inés, pronounced [ariˈjaːn]; born 10 April 2007) is the third and youngest daughter of King Willem-Alexander and Queen Máxima. Princess Ariane is a member of the Dutch royal house and currently third in the line of succession to the Dutch throne.

== Life ==
Princess Ariane was born in the HMC Bronovo in The Hague at 21:56 local time on 10 April 2007 as the third child and youngest daughter of King Willem-Alexander and Queen Máxima of the Netherlands. Prime Minister Balkenende addressed the nation shortly afterwards and said both mother and child were healthy and doing well. The next morning, her father appeared on television with his new daughter. The names of the baby were announced on 26 October, when the birth was registered in The Hague.

Princess Ariane was baptised in the Kloosterkerk, The Hague on 29 October 2007. Vicar Deodaat van der Boon used water from the Jordan River to baptize the princess, who was wearing the christening gown that Princess Wilhelmina first wore in 1880. Over 850 guests were invited to attend, including Princess Máxima's parents and Dutch prime minister Jan Peter Balkenende. Her godparents are Hereditary Grand Duke Guillaume of Luxembourg, Baron Tijo Collot d'Escury, Antoine Frilling, Valerie Delger and Inés Zorreguieta.

Princess Ariane attended the Christelijk Gymnasium Sorghvliet in The Hague. In May 2023, the Dutch Royal Court announced that the Princess would continue her secondary school studies at the UWC Adriatic in Italy. On 24 May 2025 she graduated from UWC Adriatic. It was announced in 2026 that she would begin studying aerospace engineering at Delft University of Technology in September.

She speaks Dutch, English and Spanish.

== Hospitalisation ==
On 2 May 2007, Princess Ariane was admitted to the Leiden University Medical Center with a suspected lung infection. She was released from the hospital on 5 May 2007 after treatment for her bacterial and viral infection. On 13 June 2007, Prince Willem-Alexander and Princess Máxima released a thank you note "not only for the congratulations upon Ariane's birth but also for the best wishes they received upon her hospitalisation" and released a third official picture with their newborn daughter. The couple reportedly received over 30,000 letters of well-wishers. On 8 October 2009, Princess Ariane was again admitted to a hospital, in which she had to stay for one night, due to a respiratory infection.

== Titles, styles and arms ==
=== Titles and styles ===
Ariane's full title and style is "Her Royal Highness Princess Ariane of the Netherlands, Princess of Orange-Nassau". (Note: By royal decree of 25 January 2002, nr. 41 is determined that all children of King Willem-Alexander will bear the title of Prince (Princess) of the Netherlands and Prince (Princess) of Orange-Nassau.) (Dutch: Hare Koninklijke Hoogheid Ariane Wilhelmina Máxima Inés, Prinses der Nederlanden, Prinses van Oranje-Nassau).

=== Honours ===
==== National ====
- Knight Grand Cross of the Order of the Lion of the Netherlands (10 April 2025).
- Knight of the Order of the Gold Lion of the House of Nassau (10 April 2025).

==== Foreign ====
- Japan: Dame Commander, Special Class of the Order of the Precious Crown (17 June 2026)

=== Arms ===
Coat of arms of Princess Ariane of the Netherlands
Notes Princess Ariane uses the same coat of arms as her sisters, Princess Catharina-Amalia and Princess Alexia. Escutcheon Quarterly: I and IV billety Azure and Or. A lion rampant crowned Or langued and armed Gules, holding in his dexter paw a sword Argent hilted Or, and in his sinister seven arrows Argent pointed and bound together Or. II and III Or, a horn barry Azure and Argent opened and bound Gules. An inescutcheon Or bearing a castle of three towers Gules flanked on each side by a poplar tree au naturel, and a river Azure flowing from the base, ondoyant to the gate of the castle. Symbolism The first and fourth quarters are the coat of arms of the Netherlands, based on the coat of arms of the House of Nassau. The second and third quarters are the coat of arms of the Prince of Orange. In the center is the coat of arms of the Zorreguieta family.

Princess Ariane of the Netherlands House of Orange-Nassau Born: 10 April 2007
Lines of succession
Preceded by Princess Alexia of the Netherlands	Line of succession to the Dutch throne 3rd position	Succeeded by Prince Constantijn of the Netherlands
