= Willem-Alexander of the Netherlands =

King of the Netherlands since 2013

Willem-Alexander
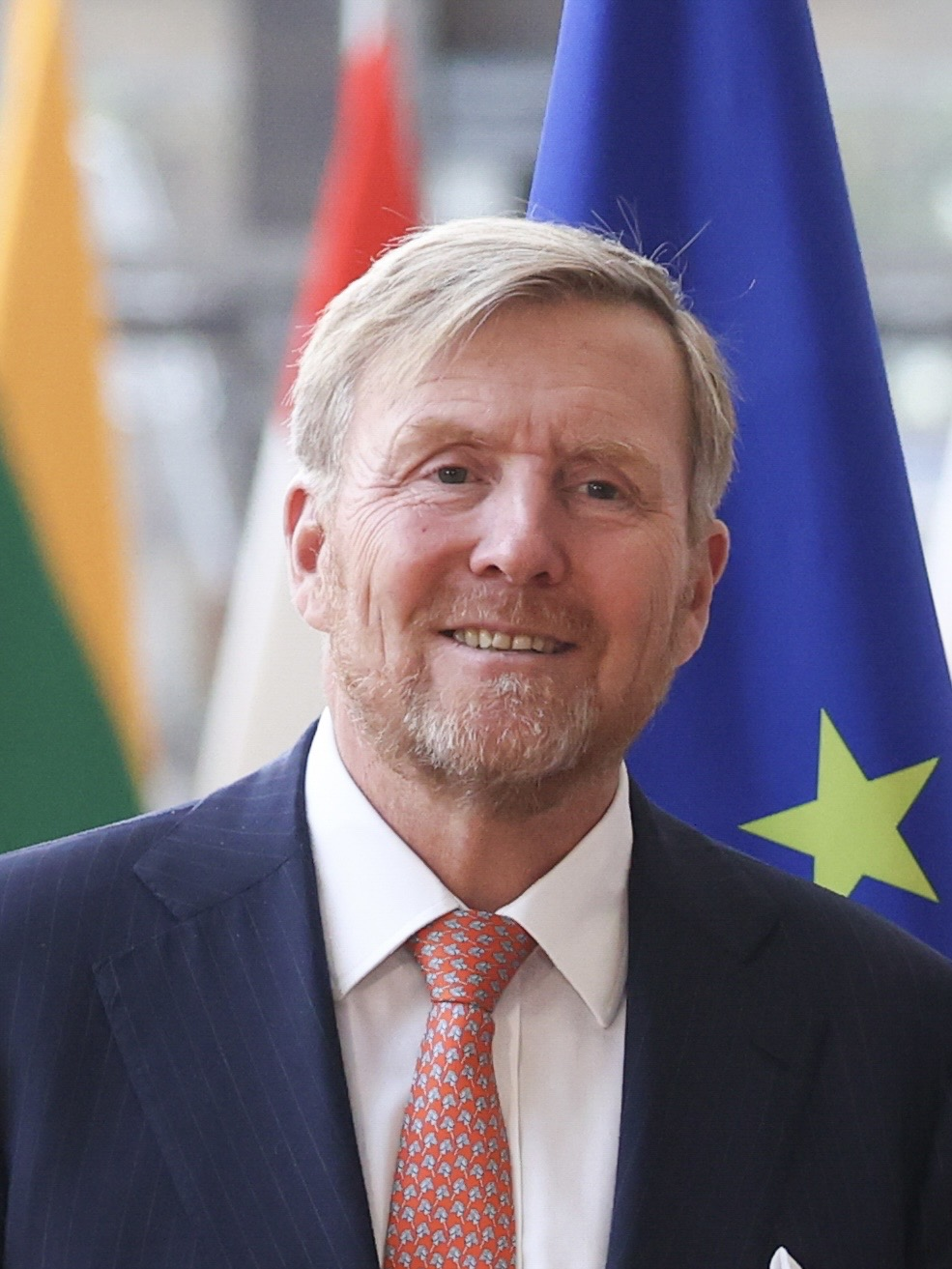
- Willem-Alexander in 2025

King of the Netherlands
- Reign: 30 April 2013 – present
- Inauguration: 30 April 2013
- Predecessor: Beatrix
- Heir apparent: Catharina-Amalia, Princess of Orange
- Born: 27 April 1967 (age 59); Utrecht, Netherlands
- Spouse: Máxima Zorreguieta (m. 2002)
- Issue: Catharina-Amalia, Princess of Orange; Princess Alexia; Princess Ariane
Names
- Willem-Alexander Claus George Ferdinand
- House: Orange-Nassau (official); Amsberg (agnatic)
- Father: Claus von Amsberg
- Mother: Beatrix of the Netherlands
- Religion: Protestant
- Education: Leiden University (drs.)
- Military career
- Branch: Royal Netherlands Navy; Royal Netherlands Army; Royal Netherlands Air Force; Royal Marechaussee
- Service years: 1985–2013
- Rank: Commodore (Navy); Brigadier general (Army and Marechaussee); Air commodore (Air Force)

Willem-Alexander (Dutch: [ˈʋɪləm aːlɛkˈsɑndər]; Willem-Alexander Claus George Ferdinand; born 27 April 1967) is King of the Netherlands, reigning since 30 April 2013.

Willem-Alexander was born in Utrecht during the reign of his maternal grandmother, Queen Juliana, as the eldest child of Princess Beatrix (later Queen) and Prince Claus. He became Prince of Orange as heir apparent upon his mother's accession on 30 April 1980. He went to public primary and secondary schools in the Netherlands, and an international sixth-form college in Wales UWC Atlantic College. He served in the Royal Netherlands Navy, and studied history at Leiden University. He married Máxima Zorreguieta Cerruti in 2002, and they have three daughters: Catharina-Amalia, Alexia, and Ariane. Willem-Alexander succeeded his mother as monarch upon her abdication on 30 April 2013. He is the first man to hold this position since the death of his great-great-grandfather William III in 1890.

Willem-Alexander is interested in sports and international water management issues. Until his accession to the throne, he was a member of the International Olympic Committee (1998–2013), chairman of the Advisory Committee on Water to the Dutch Minister of Infrastructure and the Environment (2004–2013), and chairman of the Secretary-General of the United Nations' Advisory Board on Water and Sanitation (2006–2013).

== Early life and education ==
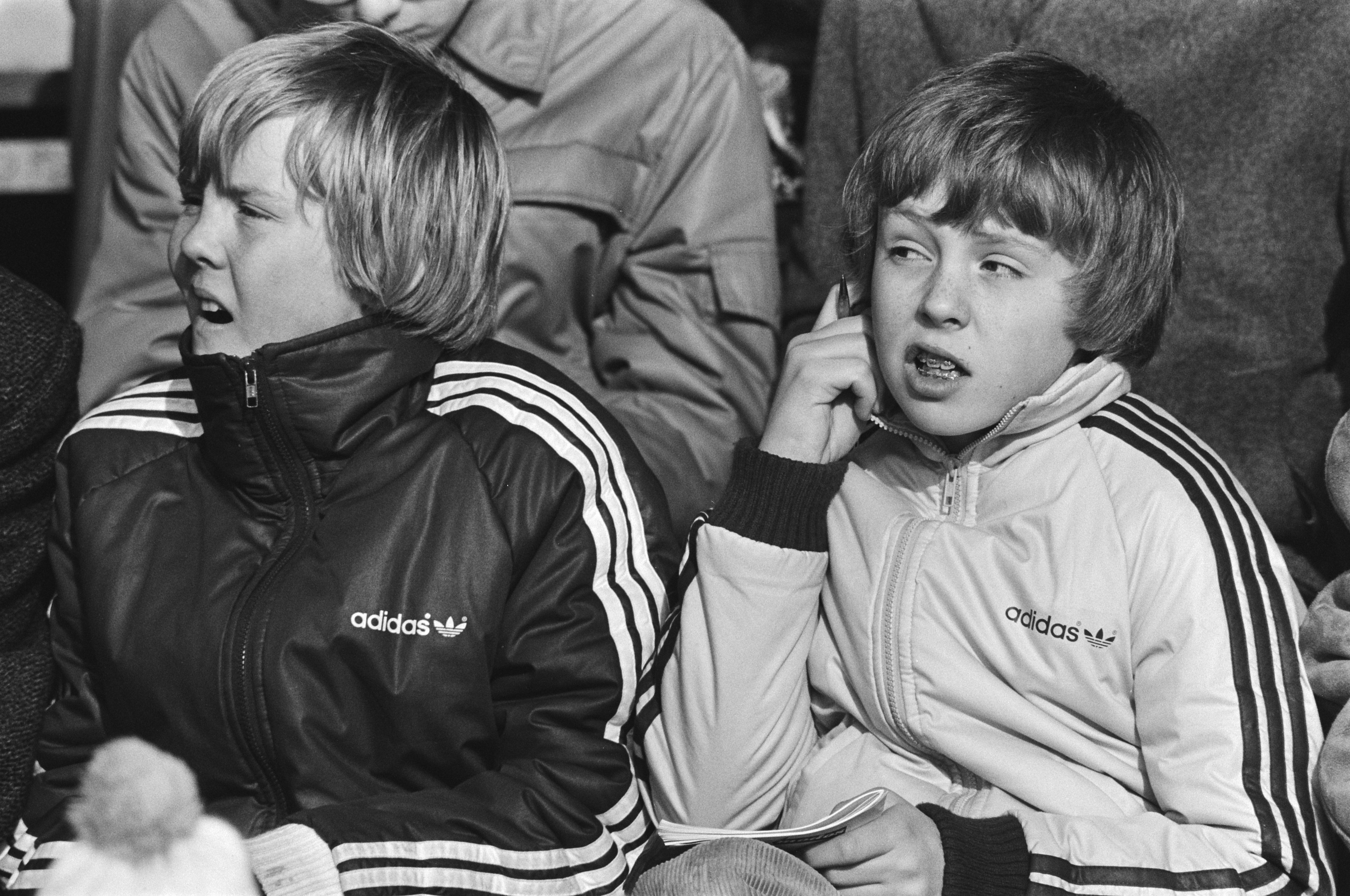
Prince Willem-Alexander (left) at age 14 and his brother Friso in 1982

Willem-Alexander was born on 27 April 1967 at Academic Hospital Utrecht (now known as the University Medical Center Utrecht) in Utrecht. He is the first child of Princess Beatrix (later Queen) and Prince Claus, and the first grandchild of Queen Juliana and Prince Bernhard. He was the first male Dutch royal baby since the birth of Prince Alexander in 1851, and the first immediate male heir since Alexander's death in 1884.

From birth, Willem-Alexander has held the titles Prince of the Netherlands (Dutch: Prins der Nederlanden), Prince of Orange-Nassau, and Jonkheer of Amsberg. He was baptised as a member of the Dutch Reformed Church on 2 September 1967 (Note: "40 meest gestelde vragen" [40 most frequently asked questions]. Dutch Royal House (in Dutch).) in Saint Jacob's Church in The Hague. His godparents are his maternal grandfather Prince Bernhard of Lippe-Biesterfeld, his paternal grandmother Gösta Freiin von dem Bussche-Haddenhausen, Prince Ferdinand von Bismarck, former Prime Minister Jelle Zijlstra, Jonkvrouw Renée Röell, and Queen Margrethe II.

He had two younger brothers: Prince Friso (1968–2013) and Prince Constantijn (b. 1969). He lived with his family at the castle Drakensteyn in the hamlet Lage Vuursche near Baarn from his birth until 1981, when they moved to the larger palace Huis ten Bosch in The Hague. His mother, Beatrix, became Queen of the Netherlands in 1980, after his grandmother Juliana abdicated. He then received the title of Prince of Orange as heir apparent to the throne of the Kingdom of the Netherlands at the age of 13.

Willem-Alexander attended local state primary school Nieuwe Baarnse Elementary School in Baarn from 1973 to 1979. He went to two different state secondary schools (the Baarns Lyceum in Baarn from 1979 to 1981 and the Eerste Vrijzinnig Christelijk Lyceum in The Hague from 1981 to 1983) and the private sixth-form college United World College of the Atlantic in Wales (1983 to 1985), where he received his International Baccalaureate.

After his military service from 1985 to 1987, Willem-Alexander studied history at Leiden University from 1987 onwards and received his Master of Arts degree (doctorandus) in 1993. His final thesis was on the Dutch response to France's decision under President Charles de Gaulle to leave NATO's integrated command structure.

Willem-Alexander speaks English, Spanish (his wife's native language), French, and German (his father's native language), in addition to his native Dutch.

== Military training and career ==
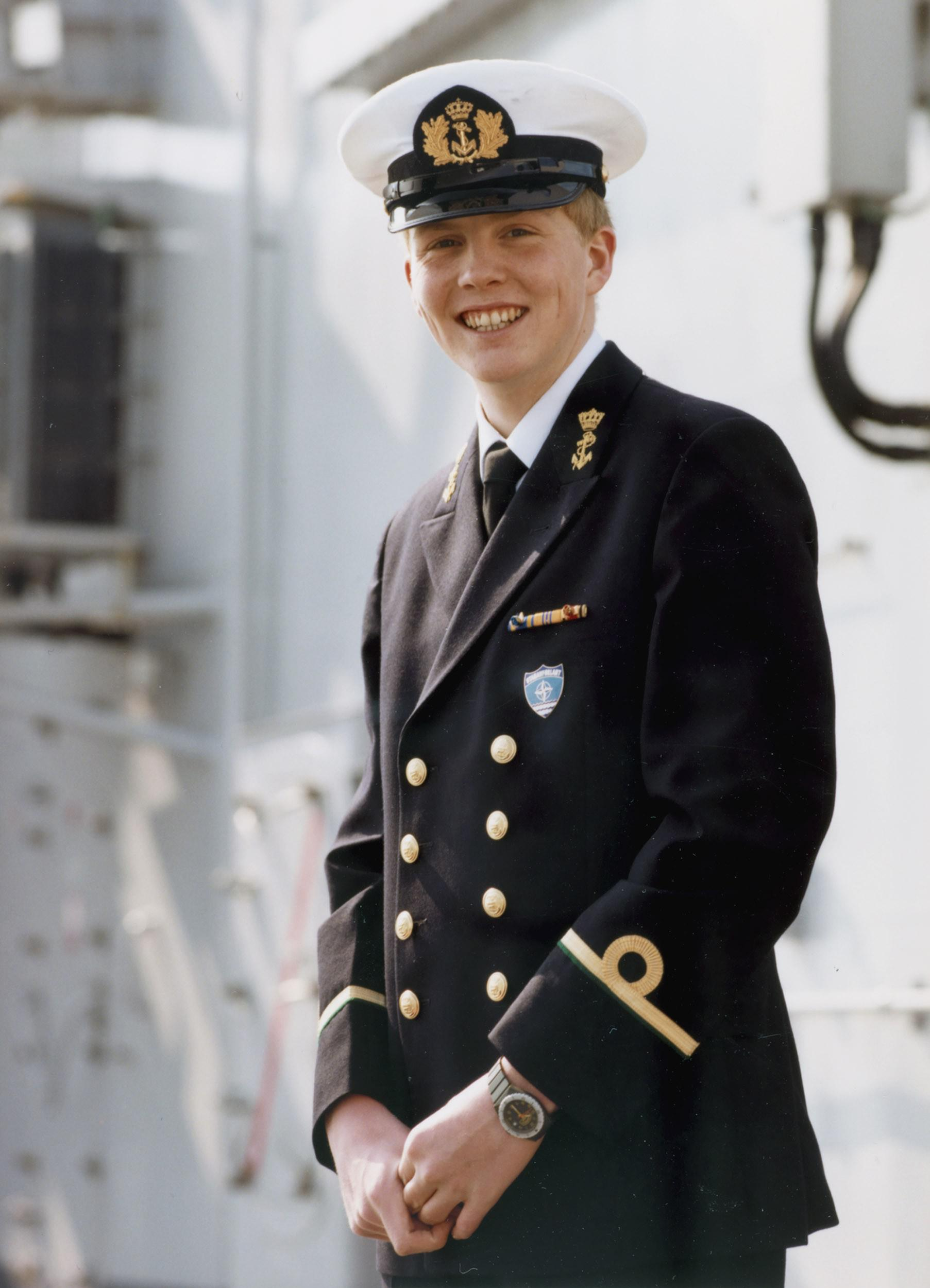
Willem-Alexander in the navy uniform of ensign in 1986

Between secondary school and his university education, Willem-Alexander performed military service in the Royal Netherlands Navy from August 1985 until January 1987. He received his training at the Royal Netherlands Naval College and in the frigates HNLMS Tromp and HNLMS Abraham Crijnssen, where he was an ensign. In 1988 he received additional training in the ship HNLMS Van Kinsbergen and became a lieutenant (junior grade) (wachtofficier).

As a reservist for the Royal Netherlands Navy, Willem-Alexander was promoted to lieutenant commander in 1995, commander in 1997, Captain at Sea in 2001, and commodore in 2005. As a reservist for the Royal Netherlands Army, he was made a major (Grenadiers' and Rifles Guard Regiment) in 1995, and was promoted to lieutenant colonel in 1997, colonel in 2001, and brigadier general in 2005. As a reservist for the Royal Netherlands Air Force, he was made squadron leader in 1995 and promoted to air commodore in 2005. As a reservist for the Royal Marechaussee, he was made brigadier general in 2005.

Before his investiture as king in 2013, Willem-Alexander was honourably discharged from the armed forces. The government declared that the head of state cannot be a serving member of the armed forces, since the government itself holds supreme command over the armed forces. As king, Willem-Alexander may choose to wear a military uniform with royal insignia, but not with his former rank insignia.

== Reign ==
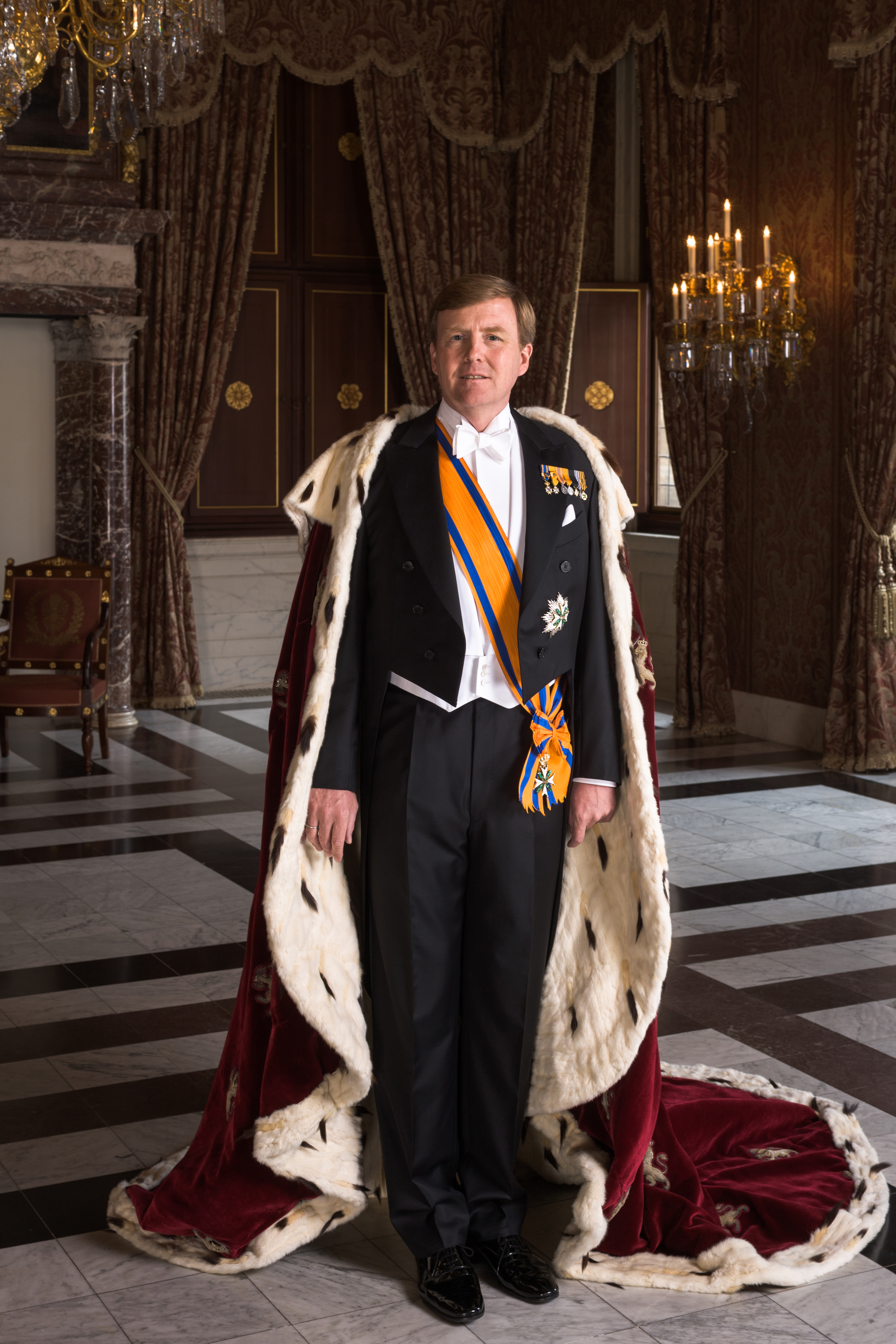
Inauguration portrait of King Willem-Alexander

On 28 January 2013, Beatrix announced her intention to abdicate. On the morning of 30 April 2013 (Koninginnedag), Beatrix signed the instrument of abdication at the Moseszaal (Moses Hall) at the Royal Palace of Amsterdam. Later that afternoon, Willem-Alexander was inaugurated as king before a joint session of the States General in a ceremony held at the Nieuwe Kerk.

As king, Willem-Alexander has weekly meetings with the prime minister and speaks regularly with ministers and state secretaries. He also signs all new Acts of Parliament and royal decrees. He represents the kingdom at home and abroad. At the State Opening of Parliament, he delivers the Speech from the Throne, which announces the plans of the government for the parliamentary year. The Constitution requires that the king appoint, dismiss and swear in all government ministers and state secretaries. As king, he is also the President of the Council of State, an advisory body that reviews proposed legislation. In modern practice, the monarch seldom chairs council meetings.

At his accession at age 46, he was Europe's youngest monarch; one of the current youngest monarch in Europe, alongside Frederik X of Denmark, Felipe VI of Spain and Guillaume V of Luxembourg. He is also the first male monarch of the Netherlands since the death of his great-great-grandfather William III in 1890. Willem-Alexander was one of four new sovereign monarchs in 2013 along with Pope Francis, Emir Tamim bin Hamad Al Thani of Qatar, and King Philippe of Belgium.

== Activities and social interests ==
Since 1985, when he became 18 years old, Willem-Alexander has been a member of the Council of State of the Netherlands. This is the highest council of the Dutch political system and is chaired by the head of state (then Queen Beatrix).

Willem-Alexander is interested in water management and sports issues. He was an honorary member of the World Commission on Water for the 21st century and patron of the Global Water Partnership, a body established by the World Bank, the UN, and the Swedish Ministry of Development. He was appointed as the Chairperson of the United Nations Secretary General's Advisory Board on Water and Sanitation on 12 December 2006.

On 10 October 2010, Willem-Alexander and Máxima went to the Netherlands Antilles' capital, Willemstad, to attend and represent his mother, the Queen, at the Antillean Dissolution ceremony.

He was a patron of the Dutch Olympic Games Committee until 1998 when he was made a member of the International Olympic Committee (IOC). After becoming King, he relinquished his membership and received the Gold Olympic Order at the 125th IOC Session. To celebrate the 100th anniversary of the 1928 Summer Olympics held in Amsterdam, he had expressed support to bid for the 2028 Summer Olympics.

He was a member of the supervisory board of De Nederlandsche Bank (the Dutch central bank), a member of the Advisory Council of ECP (the information society forum for government, business and civil society), patron of Veterans' Day and held several other patronages and posts.

=== Other activities ===
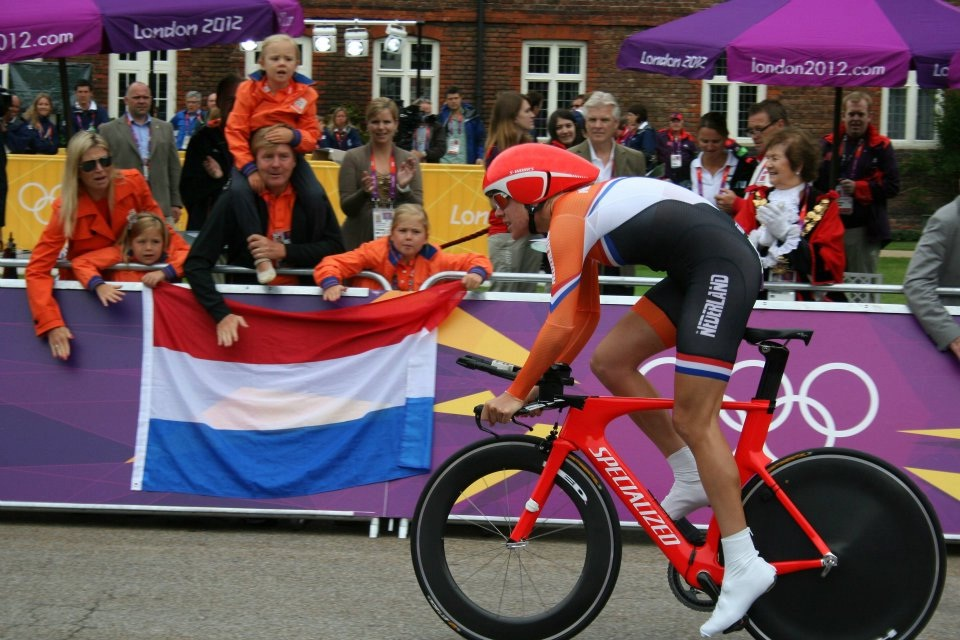
Willem-Alexander with his family at the 2012 Summer Olympics, here supporting Ellen van Dijk

Willem-Alexander is an avid pilot and has said that, had he not been a royal, he would have chosen a career as an airline pilot, ideally flying large aircraft such as the Boeing 747. During his mother's reign, he regularly flew the Dutch royal aircraft on trips.

Willem-Alexander revealed in May 2017 that he had quietly been working as a first officer with KLM since the 1990s, flying Fokker 70s for civilian KLM Cityhopper flights twice a month, even after becoming king. He said he is rarely recognized while in uniform, although some passengers recognized his voice when he made announcements, despite never introducing himself by name. Following the retirement of the Fokker 70, he transitioned to the Boeing 737, and in 2025 transitioned to the Airbus A321neo.

Using the name "W. A. van Buren", one of the least-known titles of the House of Orange-Nassau, he completed the 1986 Frisian Elfstedentocht, a 200-kilometre-long (120 mi) distance ice skating tour. He ran the full New York City Marathon under the same pseudonym in 1992.

== Marriage and children ==
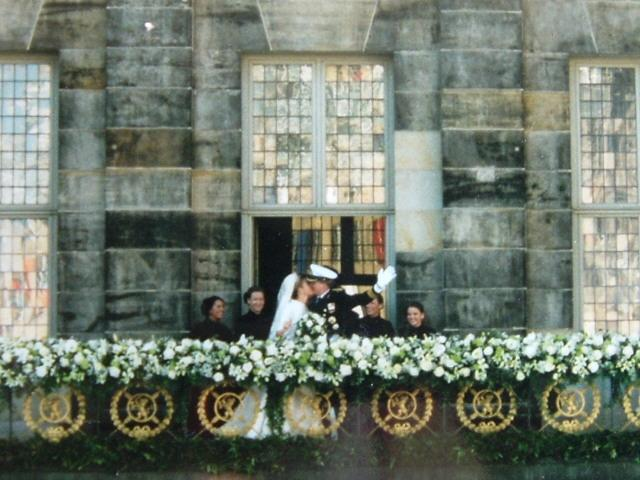
Prince Willem-Alexander and Princess Máxima kiss at the balcony of the Royal Palace of Amsterdam on their wedding day in 2002.

On 2 February 2002, he married Máxima Zorreguieta at the Nieuwe Kerk in Amsterdam. The marriage triggered significant controversy due to the role the bride's father, Jorge Zorreguieta, had in the Argentinian military dictatorship. The couple have three daughters: The Princess of Orange, Princess Alexia, and Princess Ariane.

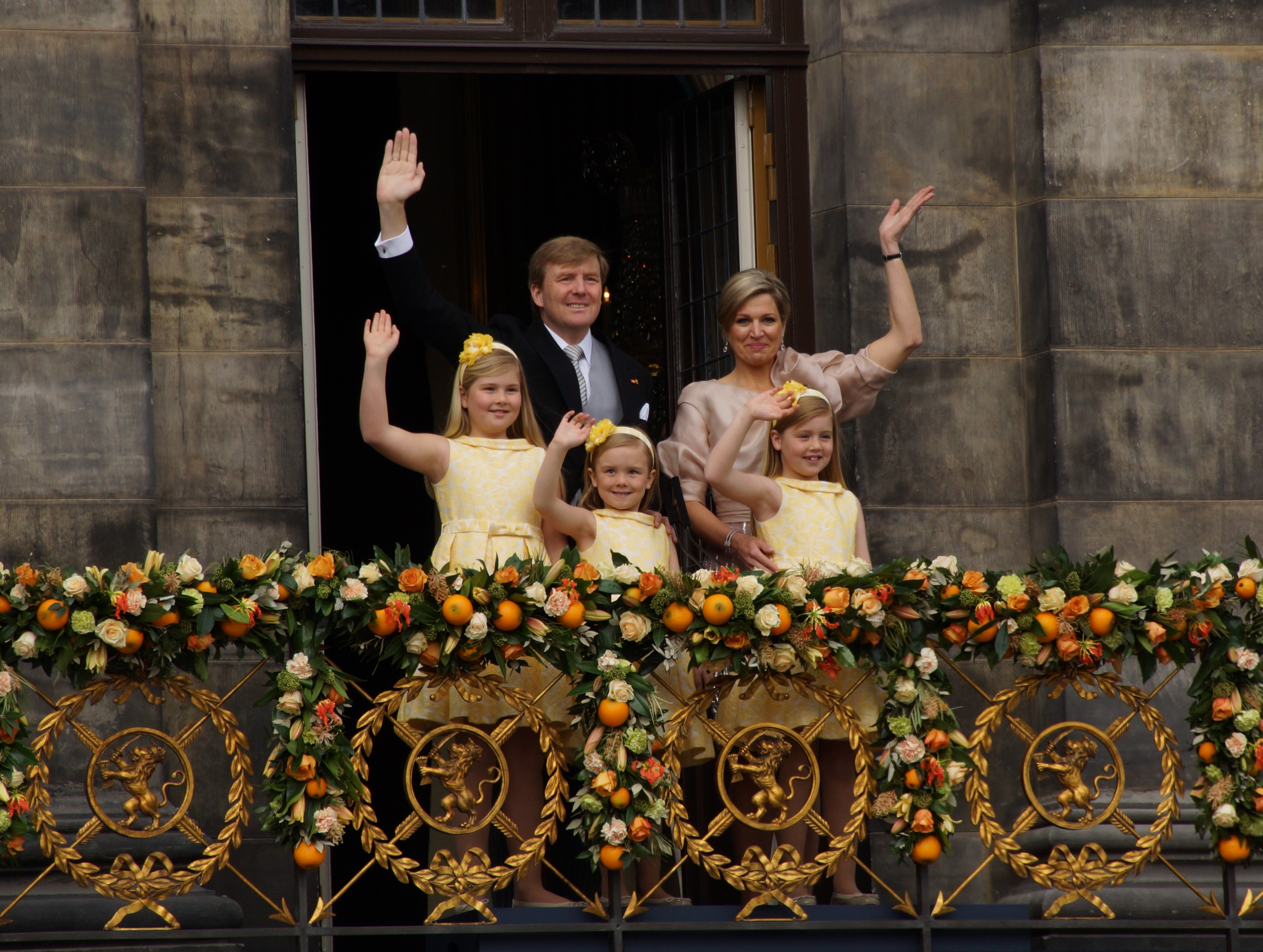
King Willem-Alexander and Queen Máxima with their daughters Princess Catharina-Amalia (left), Princess Alexia (right) and Princess Ariane (centre)

Name	Date of birth	Place of birth	Age
Catharina-Amalia, Princess of Orange	7 December 2003	The Hague, Netherlands	22
Princess Alexia of the Netherlands	26 June 2005	The Hague, Netherlands	21
Princess Ariane of the Netherlands	10 April 2007	The Hague, Netherlands	19

== Privacy and the press ==
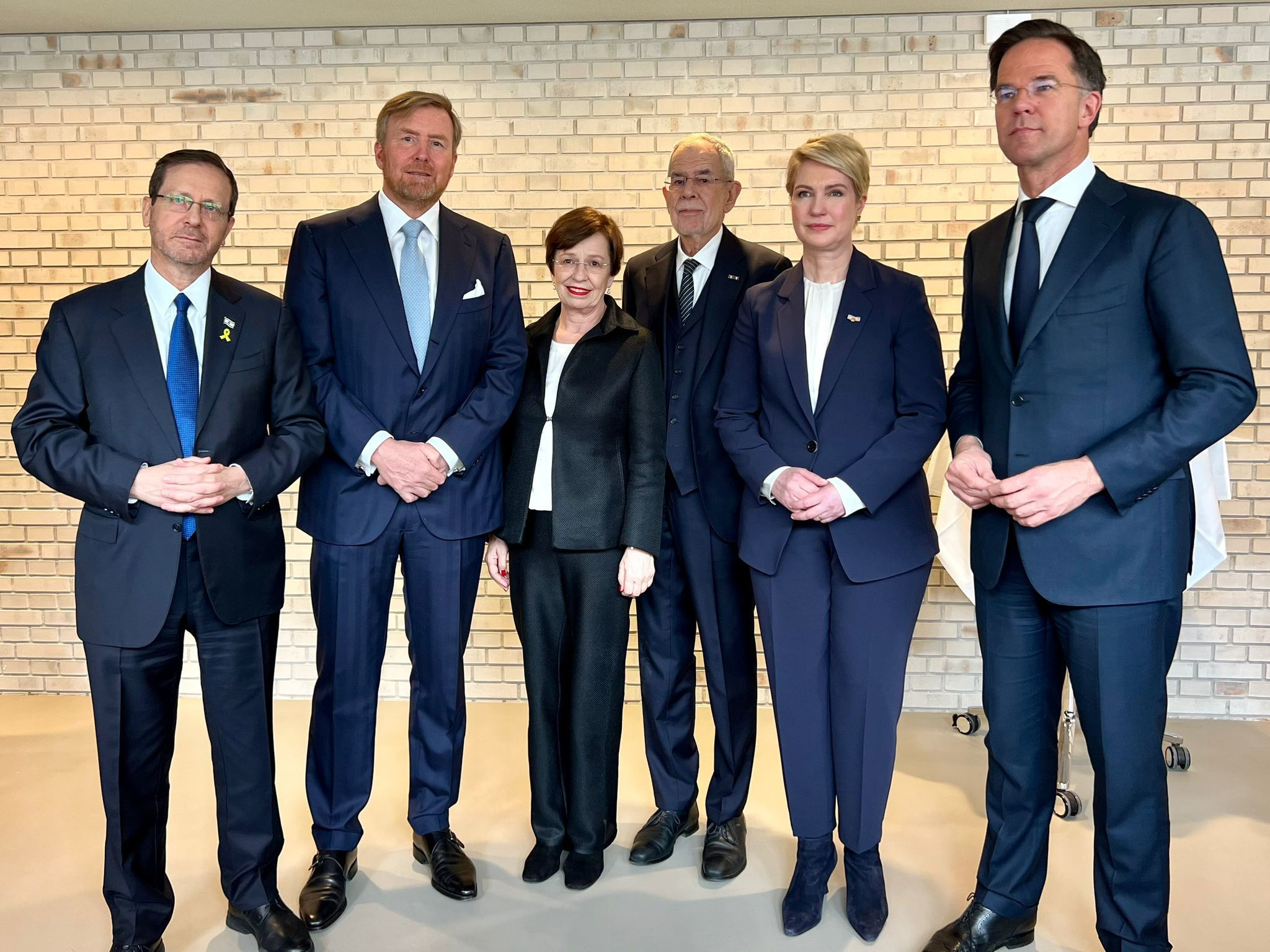
Willem-Alexander with Dutch Prime Minister Mark Rutte, Austrian President Alexander Van der Bellen and Israeli President Isaac Herzog on 10 March 2024

In an attempt to strike a balance between privacy for the royal family and availability to the press, the Netherlands Government Information Service (RVD) instituted a media code on 21 June 2005 which essentially states that:

- Photographs of the members of the royal house while performing their duties are always permitted.
- For other occasions (like holidays or vacations), the RVD will arrange a photo-op on condition that the press leave the family alone for the rest of the activity.

During a ski vacation in Argentina, several photographs were taken of the prince and his family during the private part of their holiday, including one by Associated Press staff photographer Natacha Pisarenko, in spite of the media code, and after a photo opportunity had been provided earlier. The Associated Press decided to publish some of the photos, which were subsequently republished by several Dutch media. Willem-Alexander and the RVD jointly filed lawsuit against the Associated Press on 5 August 2009, and the trial started on 14 August 2009 at the district court in Amsterdam. On 28 August 2009, the district court ruled in favour of the prince and RVD, citing that the couple has a right to privacy, that the pictures in question add nothing to any public debate, and that they are not of any particular value to society since they are not photographs of his family "at work". Associated Press was sentenced to stop further publication of the photographs, on pain of a €1,000 fine per violation with a €50,000 maximum.

In October 2020, Willem-Alexander apologised for a family holiday trip to Greece which had taken place while his country was under partial lockdown during the COVID-19 pandemic. He and his family cut their trip short, and in a two-minute video he stated that it "hurts to have betrayed" people's trust. Earlier in August 2020, he and his wife were photographed with a restaurant owner during another trip to Greece, which was a violation of social distancing rules at the time.

== Properties ==
From 2003 until 2019, Willem-Alexander and his family lived in Villa Eikenhorst on the De Horsten Estate in Wassenaar. After his mother abdicated and became Princess Beatrix once again, she moved to the castle of Drakensteyn, after which the King and his family moved to the newly renovated monarch's palace of Huis ten Bosch in The Hague in 2019.

Willem-Alexander has a villa near Kranidi, Greece.

=== Villa in Machangulo ===
On 10 July 2008, the Prince of Orange and Princess Máxima announced that they had invested in a development project on the Mozambican peninsula of Machangulo. The development project was aimed at building an ecologically responsible vacation resort, including a hotel and several luxury holiday homes for investors. The project was to invest heavily in the local economy of the peninsula (building schools and a local clinic) with an eye both towards responsible sustainability and maintaining a local staff. (Note: Waterfield, Bruno (2009-10-10). "Dutch Crown Prince Willem-Alexander accused over Mozambique villa". The Daily Telegraph. London. Archived from the original on 2010-06-01.) After contacting Mozambican President Armando Guebuza to verify that the Mozambican government had no objections, the couple decided to invest in two villas. In 2009, controversy erupted in parliament and the press about the project and the prince's involvement. Politician Alexander Pechtold questioned the morality of building such a resort in a poor country like Mozambique. After public and parliamentary controversy, the royal couple announced that they had decided to sell the property in Machangulo once their house was completed. In January 2012, it was confirmed that the villa had been sold.

== Ancestry ==
Through his father, a member of the House of Amsberg, he is descended from families of the lower German nobility, and through his mother, from several royal German–Dutch families such as the House of Lippe, Mecklenburg-Schwerin, the House of Orange-Nassau, Waldeck and Pyrmont, and the House of Hohenzollern. He is descended from the first king of the Netherlands, William I of the Netherlands, who was also a ruler in Luxembourg and several German states, and all subsequent Dutch monarchs.

Through his mother, Willem-Alexander also descends from Paul I of Russia and thus from German princess Catherine the Great and Swedish King Gustav I. Through his father, he is also descended from several Dutch–Flemish families who left the Low Countries during Spanish rule, such as the Berenbergs. His paternal great-great-grandfather Gabriel von Amsberg, a major-general of Mecklenburg, was recognized as noble as late as 1891, the family having adopted the "von" in 1795.

Willem-Alexander is a descendant of King George II and, more relevant for his succession rights, of his granddaughter Princess Augusta of Great Britain. Under the British Act of Settlement, King Willem-Alexander forfeited his (distant) succession rights to the throne of the United Kingdom by marrying a Roman Catholic. This right has since been restored in 2015 under the Succession to the Crown Act 2013.

Finally, Willem-Alexander is also a distant descendant of William the Silent, who is held to be the Father of the Nation in the Netherlands, since John William Friso, a great-great-grandson of William the Silent, is known to be a common ancestor to all current European monarchs.

== Titles, styles, honours and arms ==
=== Titles and styles ===
- 27 April 1967 – 30 April 1980: His Royal Highness Prince Willem-Alexander of the Netherlands, Prince of Orange-Nassau, Lord of Amsberg
- 30 April 1980 – 30 April 2013: His Royal Highness The Prince of Orange
- 30 April 2013 – present: His Majesty The King

Willem-Alexander's full title is: His Majesty King Willem-Alexander, King of the Netherlands, Prince of Orange-Nassau, etc., etc., etc.

Willem-Alexander is the first Dutch king since Willem III (d. 1890). Willem-Alexander had earlier indicated that when he became king, he would take the name Willem IV, but it was announced in January 2013 that his regnal name would be Willem-Alexander.

=== Military ranks ===
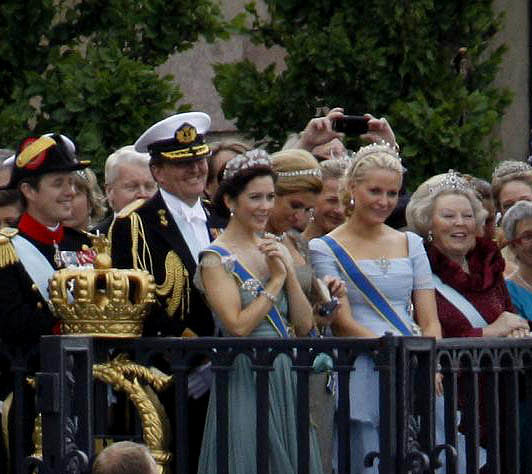
Willem-Alexander in the navy uniform of commodore at the wedding of the Crown Princess of Sweden and Daniel Westling in June 2010

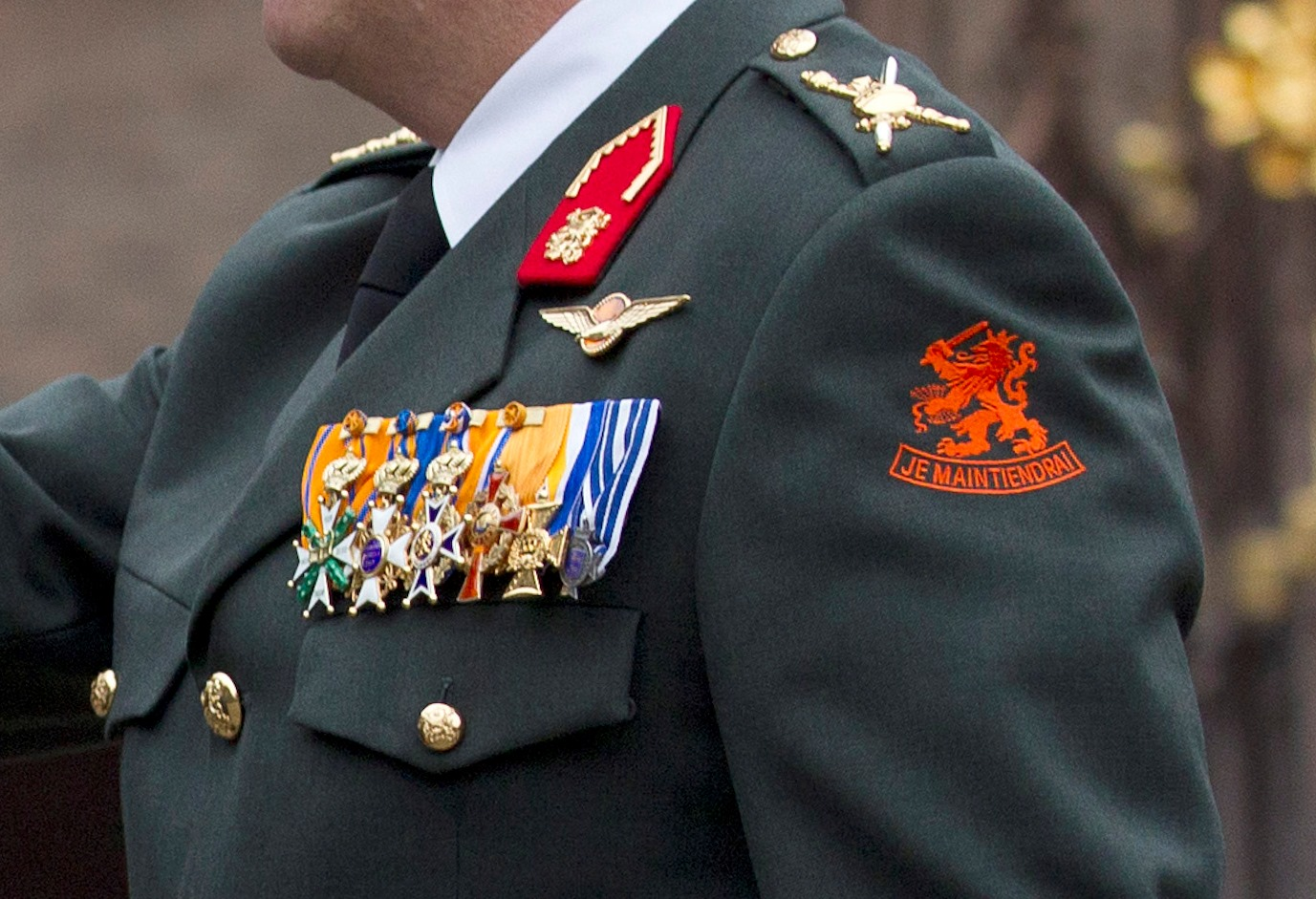
King Willem-Alexander in uniform with the Royal insignia

==== Royal Netherlands Navy ====
- Lieutenant at sea third class - conscripted (Ensign) (August 1985 – January 1987)
- Lieutenant at sea second class - conscripted (Sub-lieutenant) (watch officer, 1988)
- Lieutenant at sea second class, senior grade - reserve (Lieutenant) (1988–1995)
- Lieutenant at sea first class - reserve (Lieutenant Commander) (1995–1997)
- Captain-lieutenant at sea - reserve(Commander) (1997–2001)
- Captain at Sea - reserve (2001–2005)
- Commodore - reserve (2005–2013)
- King's insignia (2013–present)

==== Royal Netherlands Air Force ====
- Squadron Leader - reserve (1995–2005)
- Air Commodore - reserve (2005–2013)
- King's insignia (2013–present)

==== Royal Netherlands Army ====
- Major, Grenadiers' and Rifles Guard Regiment – reserve (1995–1997)
- Lieutenant colonel – reserve (1997–2001)
- Colonel – reserve (2001–2005)
- Brigadier general – reserve (2005–2013)
- King's insignia (2013–present)

==== Royal Marechaussee ====
- Brigadier general – reserve (2005–2013)
- Royal insignia (2013–present)

=== Qualifications ===
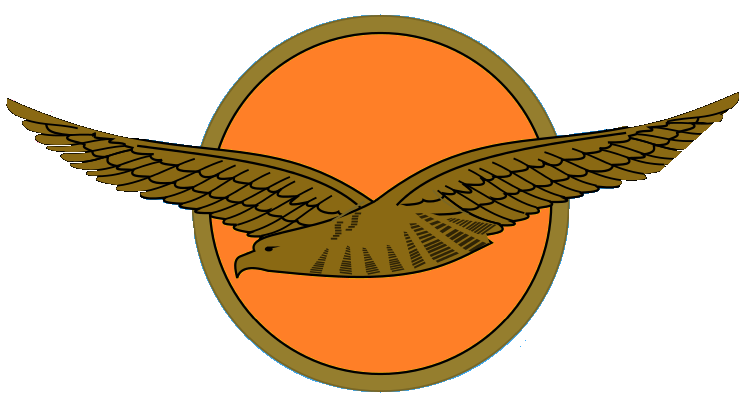
- Military Pilot

=== Honours ===
Willem-Alexander has been awarded with the following distinctions:

==== National ====
- Grand Master of the Military William Order (since 30 April 2013)
- Grand Master of the Order of the Netherlands Lion (since 30 April 2013; Knight Grand Cross, 1985 – 2013) (Note: Per tradition, all children of a Dutch monarch are awarded the highest Dutch civil honour, the Grand Cross of the Order of the Netherlands Lion, on their eighteenth birthday, including Willem-Alexander on 27 april 1985. He held this grade until he ascended the throne on 30 April 2013, at which point he became the Grand Master of the order.)
- Grand Master of the Order of Orange-Nassau (since 30 April 2013)
- Co-Grand Master of the Order of the Gold Lion of the House of Nassau (since 30 April 2013; Knight, 1967 – 2013) (Note: As a son of Queen Beatrix of the Netherlands at the time, Willem-Alexander was automatically appointed a Knight in the Order of the Golden Lion of Nassau at birth. He held this grade until he ascended the throne on 30 April 2013, at which point he became joint Grand Master of the order (with Guillaume V, Grand Duke of Luxembourg being the other since 2025).)
- Grand Master of the Order of the House of Orange (since 30 April 2013)
- Recipient of the Officer Long Service Cross, with "XXV" insignia (6 December 2011) (Note: Willem-Alexander received the Officer's Cross on 6 December 2001, marked with "XV" insignia for 15 years of service. It was upgraded with the "XX" insignia in 2006 for 20 years and with the "XXV" insignia in 2011 for 25 years of service. In 2013, he was honorably discharged upon becoming king, as monarchs cannot serve as soldiers, and he no longer receives new year insignia.)
- Recipient of the Queen Beatrix Inauguration Medal (30 April 1980)
- Recipient of the Wedding Medal of Willem-Alexander and Máxima Zorreguieta (2 February 2002)
- Recipient of the King Willem-Alexander Inauguration Medal (30 April 2013)
- Honorary Commander of the Order of Saint John in the Netherlands (since 2013)
- Recipient of the Eleven Cities Cross (26 February 1986)

==== Foreign ====
- Argentina: Collar of the Order of the Liberator General San Martín
- Austria: Grand Star of the Decoration of Honour for Services to the Republic of Austria
- Belgium:
  - Grand Cordon of the Order of Leopold (2016)
  - Grand Cross of the Order of the Crown (1993)
- Brazil: Grand Cross of the National Order of the Southern Cross
- Brunei: Honorary Member 1st Class (with Collar) of the Family Order of Laila Utama
- Cape Verde: Member 1st Class of the Order of Amílcar Cabral (7 December 2018)
- Chile: Grand Cross of the Order of the Merit
- Cyprus: Grand Collar of the Order of Makarios III (4 March 2025)
- Czech Republic: Member 1st Class with Collar of the Order of the White Lion (4 June 2025)
- Denmark: Knight of the Order of the Elephant (RE, 31 January 1998)
- Estonia: Collar of the Order of the Cross of Terra Mariana (5 June 2018) (Note: "Kuningas Willem-Alexander" [King Willem-Alexander]. Office of the President of the Republic (in Estonian).)
- Finland: Grand Cross with Collar of the Order of the White Rose of Finland (11 December 2025)
- France:
  - Grand Cross of the Order of the Legion of Honour (20 January 2014)
  - Grand Cross of the National Order of Merit
- Germany:
  - Grand Cross 1st class of the Order of Merit of the Federal Republic of Germany (8 October 2007)
  - Grand Cross special class of the Order of Merit of the Federal Republic of Germany (5 July 2021)
- Greece: Grand Cross of the Order of the Redeemer (31 October 2022)
- Indonesia: Star of Mahaputera 1st Class
- Italy: Knight Grand Cross with Collar of the Order of Merit of the Italian Republic (19 June 2017)
- Japan: Collar of the Supreme Order of the Chrysanthemum (24 October 2014)
- Jordan: Collar of the Order of al-Hussein bin Ali (20 March 2018)
- Latvia: Commander Grand Cross with Chain of the Order of the Three Stars (6 June 2018)
- Lithuania: Order of Vytautas the Great with the Golden Chain (13 June 2018)
- Luxembourg:
  - Grand Cross of the Order of Adolphe of Nassau
  - Grand Cross of the Order of the Oak Crown
- Mexico: Grand Cross of the Mexican Order of the Aztec Eagle (2009)
- Norway: Grand Cross with Collar of the Royal Norwegian Order of Saint Olav (GC, 1996; w/ collar, 2021)
- Oman:
  - Collar of the Order of Al Said (15 April 2025)
  - Collar of the Grand Order of the Rennaissance (10 January 2012)
- Poland: Grand Cross of the Order of the White Eagle (2014)
- Portugal:
  - Grand Collar of the Order of Prince Henry (GCollH, 10 October 2017)
  - Grand Collar of the Order of Christ (GCol, 10 December 2024)
- Slovakia: Grand Cross of the Order of the White Double Cross (7 March 2023)
- South Korea: Recipient of the Grand Order of Mugunghwa (12 December 2023)
- Spain:
  - Knight of the Collar of the Order of Charles III (26 March 2024)
  - Knight Grand Cross of the Order of Isabella the Catholic (GYC, 19 October 2001)
- Suriname: Grand Cordon of the Honorary Order of the Yellow Star (1 December 2025)
- Sweden: Knight with Collar of the Order of the Seraphim (RSerafO, 1993; w/ collar, 2022)
- Thailand: Knight Grand Cordon of the Order of Chula Chom Klao
- United Arab Emirates: Grand Cross of the Order of Union
- United Kingdom: Stranger Knight Companion of the Order of the Garter (KG, 23 October 2018)
- Venezuela: Grand Cross of the Order of the Liberator

=== Awards ===
- International Olympic Committee: Recipient of the Gold Olympic Order (8 September 2013)

=== Honorary appointment ===
- Aide-de-camp to Her Majesty The Queen (until 2013)

=== Arms ===
Coat of arms of Willem-Alexander of the Netherlands
Notes As Monarch, Willem-Alexander uses the Greater Coat of Arms of the Realm (Grote Rijkswapen). The components of the coats of arms were updated and further regulated by Queen Wilhelmina in a royal decree of 10 July 1907 and were affirmed by Queen Juliana in a royal decree of 23 April 1980. Adopted 10 July 1907 (a slightly adapted version of the original from 24 August 1815) Crest Issuing from a coronet Or, a pair of wings joined Sable each with an arched bend Argent charged with three leaves of the lime-tree stems upward Vert. Torse Azure and Or Helm Barred helmet Escutcheon Azure, billetty Or a lion with a coronet Or armed and langued Gules holding in his dexter paw a sword Argent hilted Or and in the sinister paw seven arrows Argent pointed and bound together Or. Supporters Two lions rampant Or armed and langued Gules Motto: JE MAINTIENDRAI; French: I will maintain (in Dutch: Ik zal handhaven); Other elements The monarch places this coat of arms on a purple mantle, with golden borders and tassels, lined with Ermine. Above the mantle is a purple pavilion again topped with the royal crown. (Note: Although the official blazon states the mantle as purple it often looks like (dark) red. French and German purple contains more red and less blue than American or British purple.) Banner Upon his succession to the throne, Willem-Alexander adopted the (partly modified) Royal Standard of the Netherlands, which is a square orange flag, divided in four-quarters by a nassau-blue cross. All quarters show a white and blue bugle-horn, taken from the coat of arms of the Principality of Orange. In the centre of the flag is the (small) coat of arms of the Kingdom, which originates from the arms of the House of Nassau, surmounted by a royal crown and surrounded by the insignia of the Grand Cross of the Military William Order. Symbolism The seven arrows stand for the seven provinces of the Union of Utrecht. Previous versions Quarterly, 1 and 3, Azure, billetty Or a lion with a coronet or armed and langued Gules holding in his dexter paw a sword Argent hilted Or and in the sinister paw seven arrows Argent pointed and bound together Or (royal arms of the Netherlands, i.e. that of his mother, Queen Beatrix), 2 and 4, Or, and a bugle-horn Azure, langued Gules (arms of the former Principality of Orange), on an inescutcheon Vert, a castle proper, on a mount of the last (arms of the House of Amsberg, i.e. that of his late father, Prince Claus).

== Notes ==
Willem-Alexander of the Netherlands House of Orange-Nassau Born: 27 April 1967
Regnal titles
Vacant Title last held by Alexander	Prince of Orange; 1980–2013	Succeeded by Catharina-Amalia
Dutch royalty
Preceded by Beatrix	King of the Netherlands; 2013–present	Incumbent; Heir apparent: Catharina-Amalia
