= Princess Alexia of the Netherlands =

Dutch princess (born 2005)

Princess Alexia
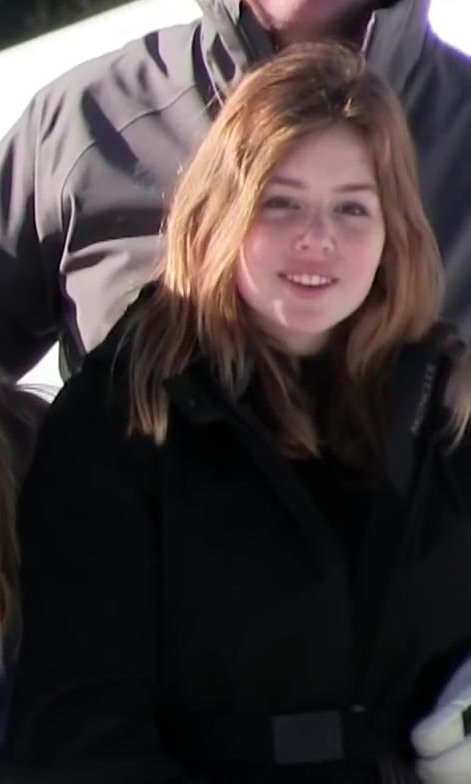
- Alexia in 2019
- Born: 26 June 2005 (age 21); The Hague, Netherlands
Names
- Alexia Juliana Marcela Laurentien
- House: Orange-Nassau (official); Amsberg (agnatic)
- Father: Willem-Alexander of the Netherlands
- Mother: Máxima Zorreguieta
- Education: UWC Atlantic; University College London

Princess Alexia of the Netherlands, Princess of Orange-Nassau (Alexia Juliana Marcela Laurentien; born 26 June 2005) is the second daughter of King Willem-Alexander and Queen Máxima. Princess Alexia is a member of the Dutch royal house and second in the line of succession to the Dutch throne.

== Life ==
Princess Alexia was born on 26 June 2005 at HMC Bronovo in The Hague as the second child of Willem-Alexander, then Prince of Orange, and his wife, Máxima. The infant's paternal uncle Prince Friso and maternal uncle Juan Zorreguieta, the then Duchess of Brabant Queen Mathilde of Belgium, Jonkvrouw Alexandra Jankovich de Jeszenice, and Jonkheer Frans Ferdinand de Beaufort stood as godparents at baptism by Reverend Deodaat van der Boon on 19 November 2005 in the Dorpskerk in Wassenaar.

Princess Alexia attended the public primary school Bloemcampschool in Wassenaar. She attended secondary school at the Christelijk Gymnasium Sorghvliet in The Hague from 2017 to 2021. Beginning in August 2021, she continued her secondary education at the United World College of the Atlantic in Wales, where her father had also been a student. She graduated, with an International Baccalaureate Diploma, in 2023.

In 2024, it was announced that Alexia would start a bachelor's degree in science and engineering for social change at the Faculty of Engineering, University College London (UCL) at the end of September 2024. In November 2024, Alexia had transferred to a bachelor's degree in civil engineering at UCL's Faculty of Engineering.

She speaks Dutch, English, and Spanish.

== Hospitalisation ==
In February 2016, while on a skiing holiday with her family in Austria, Princess Alexia broke her right femur. She was transported via helicopter to a local hospital and had surgery to repair the injury. After a few days in the hospital she was released and required the use of crutches while she healed.

== Titles, styles, honours and arms ==
Alexia's full title and style is "Her Royal Highness Princess Alexia of the Netherlands, Princess of Orange-Nassau".

=== Honours ===
- Knight Grand Cross of the Order of the Netherlands Lion (26 June 2023).
- Knight of the Order of the Gold Lion of the House of Nassau (26 June 2023).

Coat of arms of Princess Alexia of the Netherlands
Notes Princess Alexia uses the same coat of arms as her sisters, Princess Catharina-Amalia, the Princess of Orange; and Princess Ariane. Escutcheon Quarterly: I and IV azure billety or, a lion with coronet also or armed and langued gules, holding in his dexter paw a sword argent hilted or, and in his sinister seven arrows argent pointed and bound together or, which is of the Kingdom of the Netherlands; II and III or, a horn azure opened and bound gules, which is of the first House of Orange; an inescutcheon or bearing a castle of three towers gules flanked on each side by a poplar tree au naturel, and a river azure flowing from the base, ondoyant to the gate of the castle, which is of the house of Zorreguieta in Argentina. Banner As Princess, Alexia uses a swallow-tailed flag, with the Royal standard colours and her paternal arms (the horn of Orange) in the upper hoist and her maternal arms (the tower of Zorreguieta) in the lower hoist. The arms of the Netherlands (which originates from Nassau) without the insignia of the Order of Willem within an orange circle. Symbolism The first and fourth quarters are the coat of arms of the Netherlands, based on the coat of arms of the House of Nassau. The second and third quarters are the coat of arms of the Prince of Orange. In the center is the coat of arms of the Zorreguieta family.

Princess Alexia of the Netherlands House of Orange-Nassau Born: 26 June 2005
Lines of succession
Preceded by The Princess of Orange	Line of succession to the Dutch throne 2nd position	Succeeded by Princess Ariane of the Netherlands
