= List of Dutch royal consorts =

Spouses of Dutch monarchs

In the Netherlands, a royal consort is a person married to the Dutch monarch during his or her reign. All female spouses of the monarchs of the Netherlands have been titled "Queen of the Netherlands" with the style Majesty. The male spouses of the three queens regnant of the Netherlands were titled "Prince of the Netherlands" with the style Royal Highness. The spouse of the Bonaparte King of Holland was "Queen of Holland" with the style Majesty. The following spouses of the monarchs of Holland between 1806 and 1810; and the Netherlands since 1813:

== Queens consort of Holland ==
No.	Picture	Name	Coat of Arms	Father	Mother	Birth	Marriage	Became Consort	Ceased to be Consort	Death	Spouse
1		Hortense Eugénie Cécile de Beauharnais		Alexandre de Beauharnais (Beauharnais)	Empress Joséphine (Beauharnais)	10 April 1783	4 January 1802	5 June 1806 husband's ascension	1 July 1810 husband's abdication	5 October 1837	Louis I

== Royal consorts of the Netherlands ==
No.	Picture	Name	Coat of Arms	Father	Mother	Birth	Marriage	Became Consort	Ceased to be Consort	Death	Spouse
1		Friederike Luise Wilhelmine of Prussia		Frederick William II of Prussia (Hohenzollern)	Frederica Louisa of Hesse-Darmstadt (Hesse-Darmstadt)	18 November 1774	1 October 1791	16 March 1815 husband's ascension	12 October 1837 (aged 62)		William I
2		Anna Pavlovna of Russia		Paul I of Russia (Holstein-Gottorp-Romanov)	Maria Feodorovna (Württemberg)	18 January 1795	21 February 1816	7 October 1840 husband's ascension	17 March 1849 husband's death	1 March 1865 (aged 70)	William II
3		Sophie Friederike Matilda of Württemberg		William I of Württemberg (Württemberg)	Catherine Pavlovna of Russia (Holstein-Gottorp-Romanov)	17 June 1818	18 June 1839	17 March 1849 husband's ascension	3 June 1877 (aged 58)		William III
4		Adelheid Emma Wilhelmina Theresia of Waldeck and Pyrmont		George Victor, Prince of Waldeck and Pyrmont (Waldeck)	Princess Helena of Nassau (Nassau-Weilburg)	2 August 1858	7 January 1879		23 November 1890 husband's death	20 March 1934 (aged 75)	William III
5		Heinrich (Henry) Wladimir Albrecht Ernst of Mecklenburg-Schwerin		Frederick Francis II, Grand Duke of Mecklenburg-Schwerin (Mecklenburg)	Princess Marie of Schwarzburg-Rudolstadt (Schwarzburg-Rudolstadt)	19 April 1876	7 February 1901		3 July 1934 (aged 58)		Wilhelmina
6		Bernhard Leopold Friedrich Eberhard Julius Kurt Karl Gottfried Peter of Lippe-Biesterfeld		Prince Bernhard of Lippe-Biesterfeld (Lippe)	Armgard von Cramm (Cramm)	29 June 1911	7 January 1937	6 September 1948 wife's ascension	30 April 1980 wife's abdication	1 December 2004 (aged 93)	Juliana
7		Claus George Willem Otto Frederik Geert van Amsberg		Klaus Felix von Amsberg (Amsberg)	Baroness Gösta von dem Bussche-Haddenhausen (Bussche-Haddenhausen)	6 September 1926	10 March 1966	30 April 1980 wife's ascension	6 October 2002 (aged 76)		Beatrix
8		Máxima Zorreguieta Cerruti		Jorge Zorreguieta	María del Carmen Cerruti Carricart	17 May 1971	2 February 2002	30 April 2013 husband's ascension	Incumbent		Willem-Alexander

== See also ==
- Princess of Orange
- List of consorts of Luxembourg
- Duchess of Limburg
- List of Belgian royal consorts
- Duchess of Brabant
- Countess of Flanders
- Countess of Hainaut
- Countess of Holland
- Countess of Artois
- List of Burgundian consorts
- List of consorts of Lorraine
- Countess of Zutphen
- List of monarchs of the Netherlands
