= Wedding of Princess Beatrix and Claus van Amsberg =

1966 Dutch royal wedding

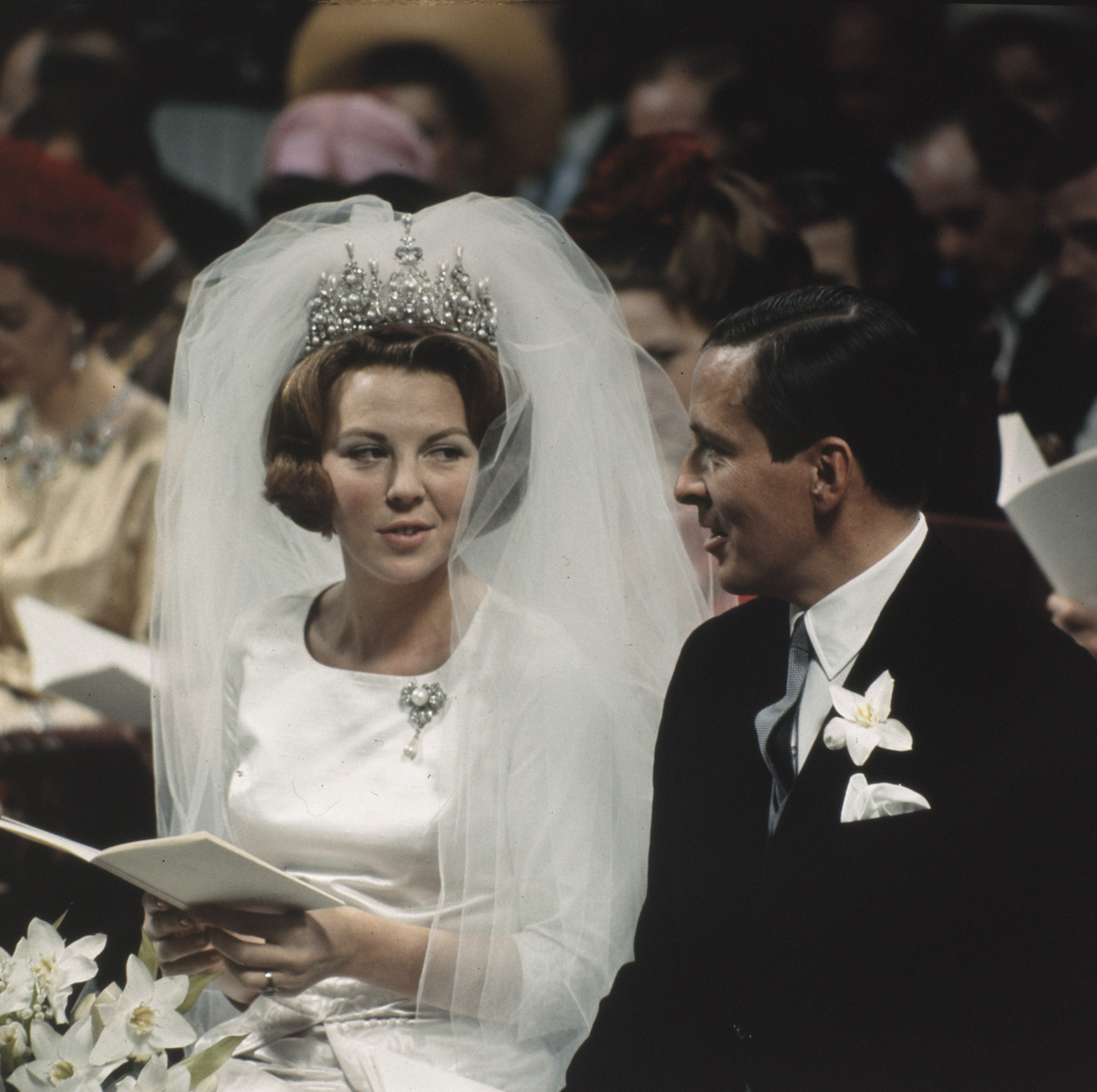
- Beatrix and Claus during the ceremony at the Westerkerk
- Date: 10 March 1966; 60 years ago
- Venue: Prinsenhof; Westerkerk; Royal Palace of Amsterdam
- Location: Amsterdam, Netherlands
- Participants: Princess Beatrix of the Netherlands; Claus van Amsberg

The wedding of Princess Beatrix of the Netherlands and Claus van Amsberg took place on Thursday, 10 March 1966, in Amsterdam, Netherlands. They were married first in a civil ceremony at the Prinsenhof, after which the marriage was religiously blessed in the Westerkerk. The bride was the eldest daughter of Queen Juliana and heir presumptive to the Dutch throne. The groom was an untitled German nobleman. The engagement of the future queen to a German caused an uproar among some Dutch people and the wedding was marred by protests.

Beatrix later reigned as Queen of the Netherlands from 1980 until her abdication in 2013.

== Engagement ==
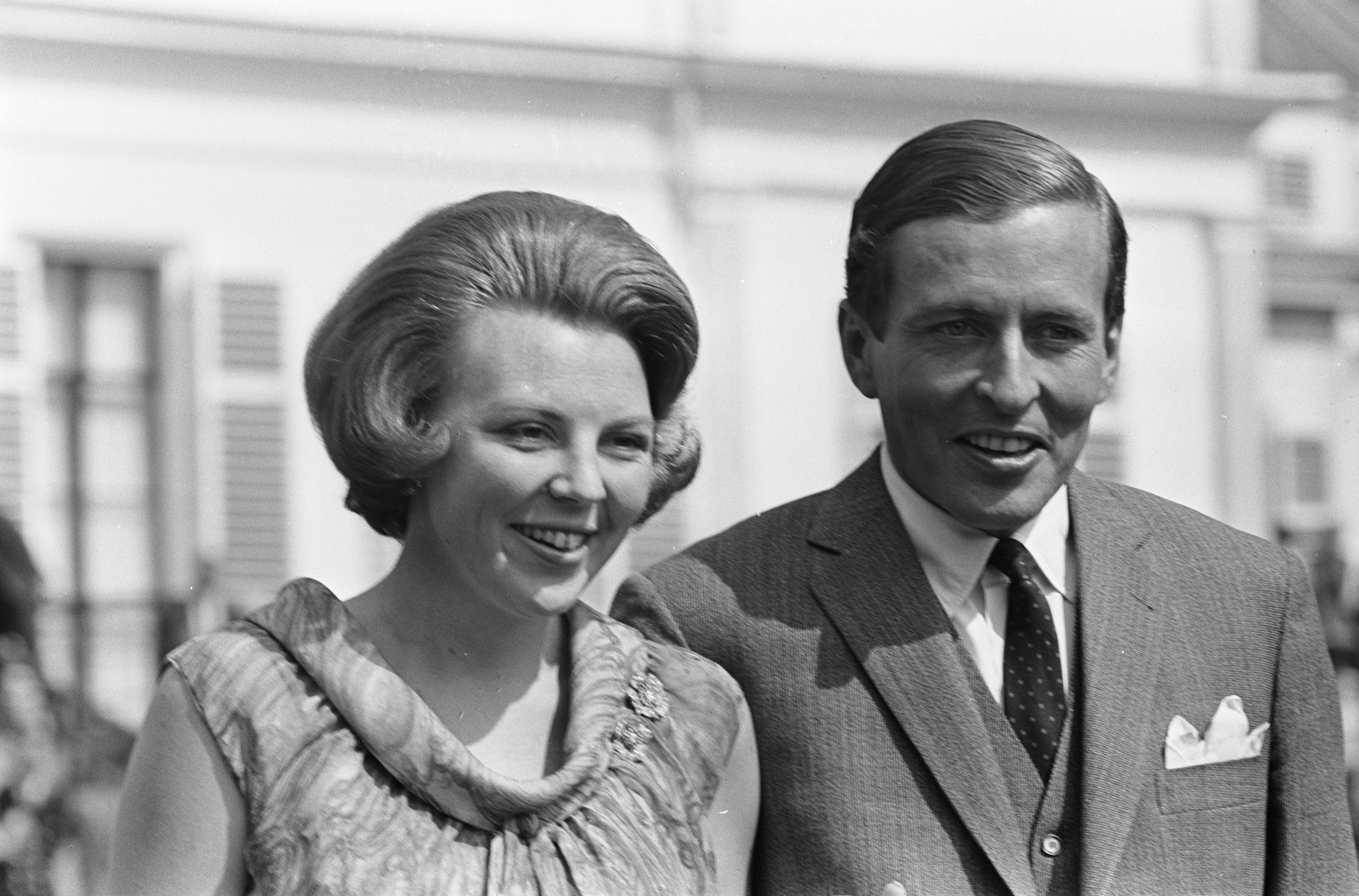
Beatrix and Claus following the announcement of their engagement at Soestdijk Palace, 28 June 1965

The couple interviewed by Herman Felderhof on their engagement, 28 June 1965

Princess Beatrix, heir presumptive to Queen Juliana of the Netherlands, first met Claus von Amsberg, an untitled German nobleman, at a New Year's Eve party in Bad Driburg in 1962. They met again later at the wedding of Moritz, Hereditary Prince of Hesse, and Princess Tatiana of Sayn-Wittgenstein-Berleburg in Giessen in the summer of 1964. The couple began dating, often using Richard, 6th Prince of Sayn-Wittgenstein-Berleburg, as a decoy for the press. Later, on a skiing holiday in Gstaad, Beatrix and Claus were spotted together while Prince Richard was spotted skiing alone.

The engagement was announced by Queen Juliana and her husband, Prince Bernhard, on 28 June 1965. After the announcement, the couple met the press in the gardens of Soestdijk Palace and granted an interview to Herman Felderhof. Queen Juliana and the States General granted their consent to the engagement. Amsberg was granted Dutch citizenship later in 1965 and changed the spelling of his name from the German "Klaus von Amsberg" to the Dutch "Claus van Amsberg".

== Pre-wedding celebrations ==
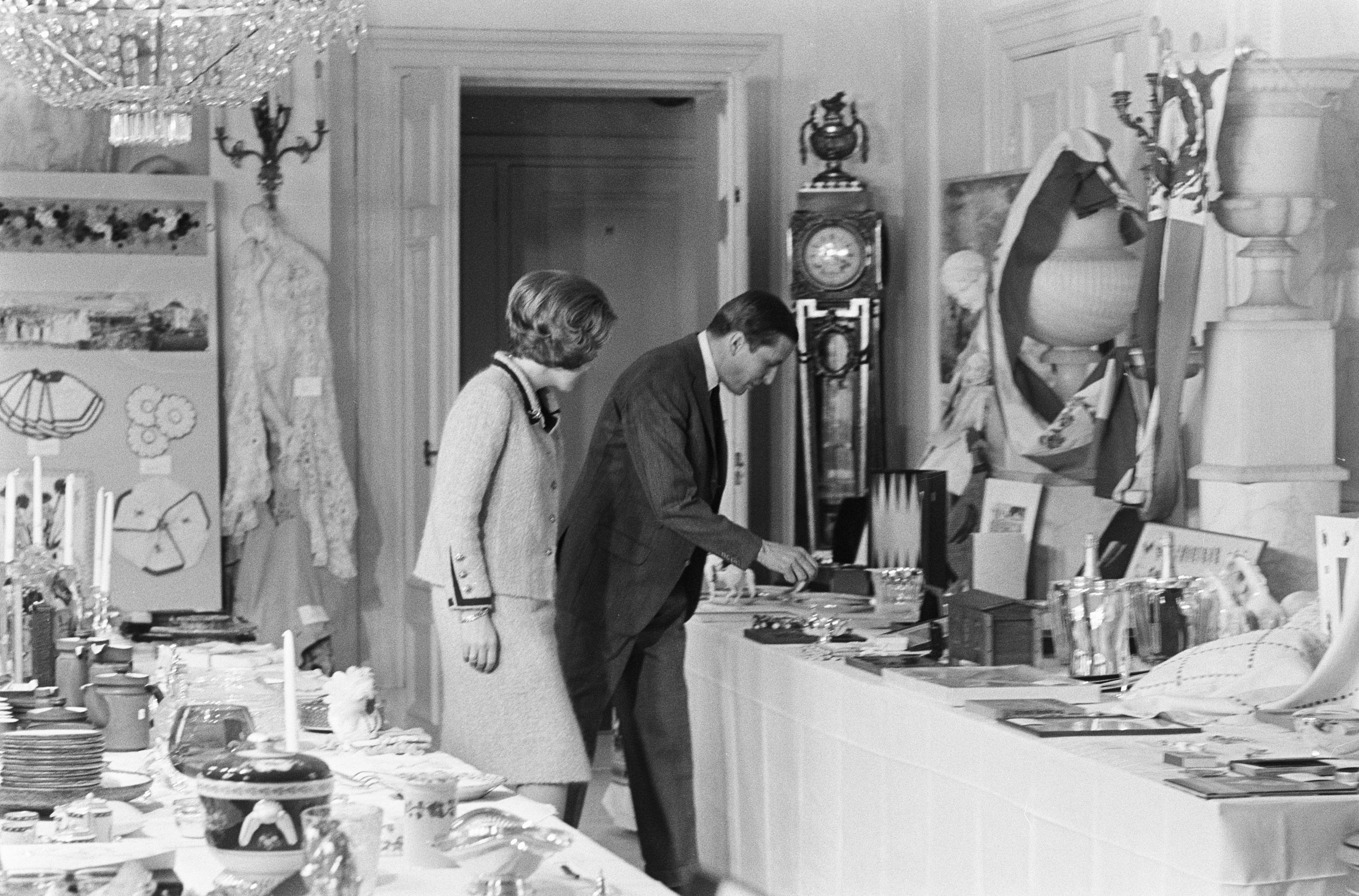
Princess Beatrix and Claus view their wedding presents at Soestdijk Palace, 5 March 1966

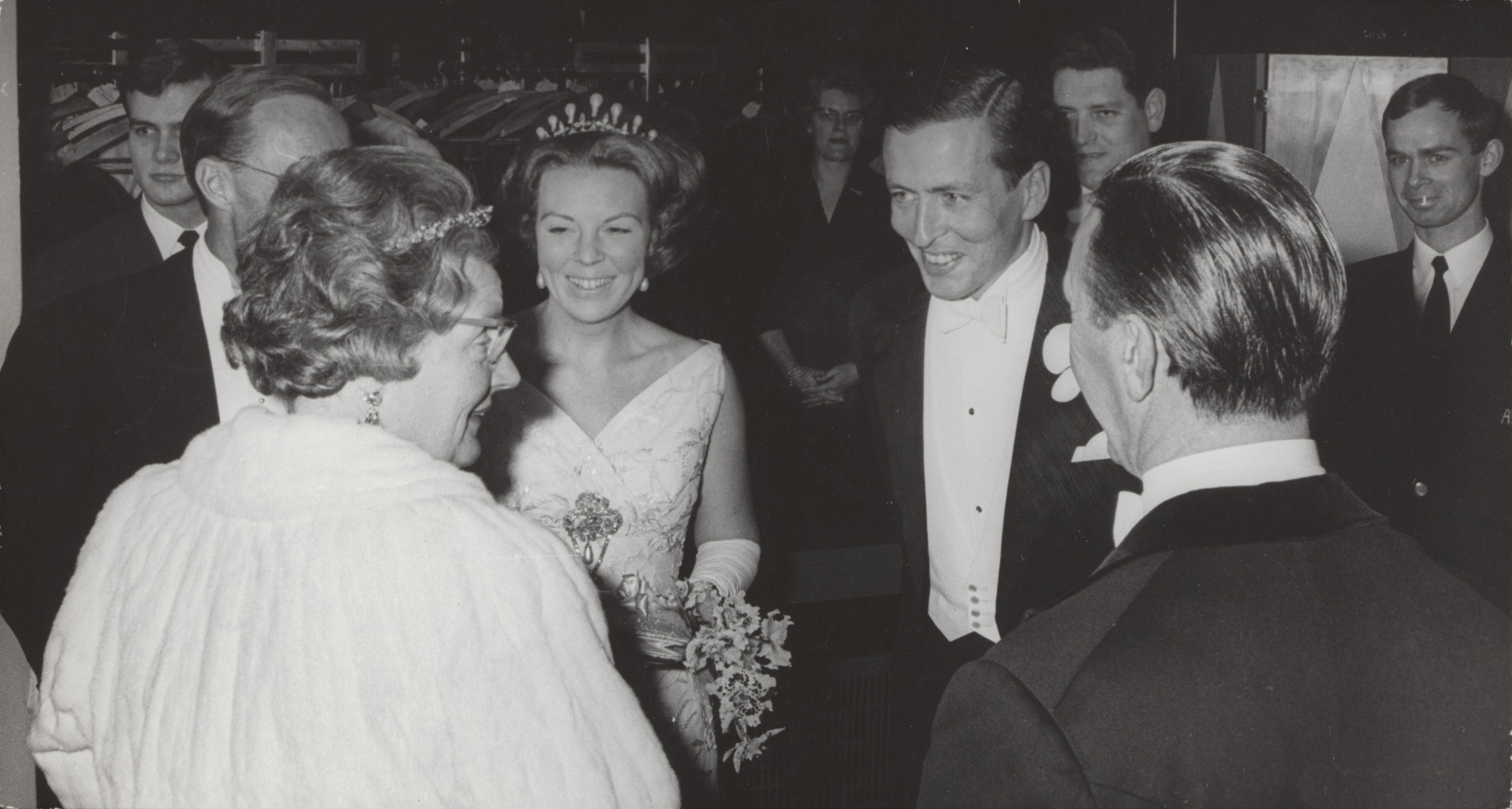
Queen Juliana, Prince Bernhard, Princess Beatrix and Claus at the pre-wedding dinner at the Hilton Amsterdam, 8 March 1966

A number of pre-wedding balls, dinners, receptions and concerts were held in the weeks leading up to the wedding. These began on 5 March, when the Dutch Government hosted a gala dinner at the Museum Het Prinsenhof in Delft, the last residence of William the Silent. Princess Beatrix wore a lavender gown and Queen Emma's small diamond tiara.

On 8 March, Queen Juliana and Prince Bernhard hosted a white tie pre-wedding dinner at the Hilton Amsterdam followed by a ball at the Royal Palace of Amsterdam attended by the foreign royal guests. Princess Beatrix wore a white and blue embroidered gown with the antique pearl tiara. The next night, on the eve of the wedding, they hosted a smaller more informal black tie party for 300 guests at the Amstel Hotel. Many of the foreign royal guests were in attendance that evening as well.

== Wedding ==
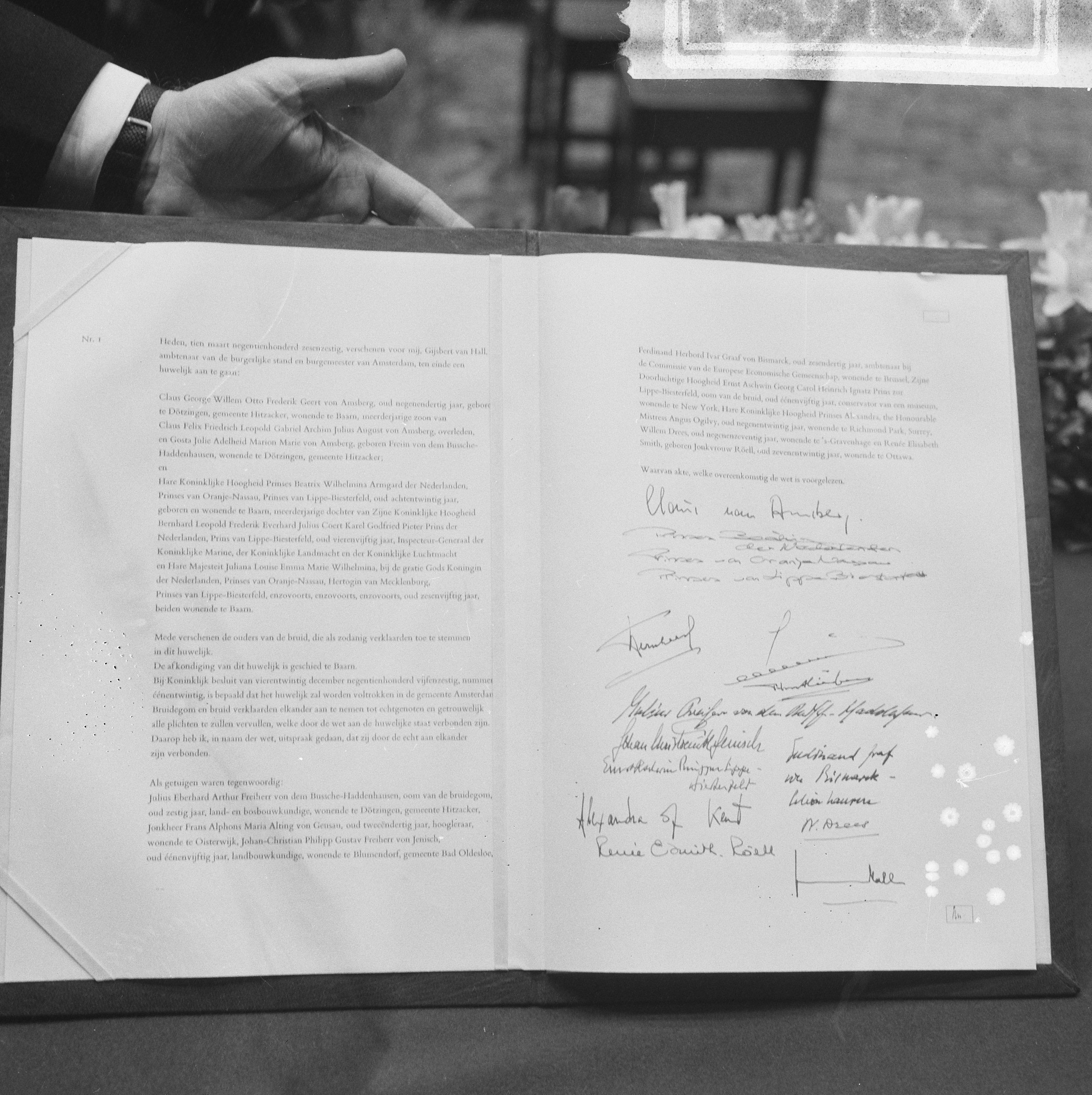
The civil marriage register

=== Civil ceremony ===
Per Dutch law, a civil marriage ceremony was required before a religious ceremony. This took place at Amsterdam's city hall, the Prinsenhof. The ceremony was performed by Gijsbert van Hall, Mayor of Amsterdam. Witnesses included the bride's paternal uncle, Prince Aschwin of Lippe-Biesterfeld, Britain's Princess Alexandra, and former Prime Minister, Willem Drees.

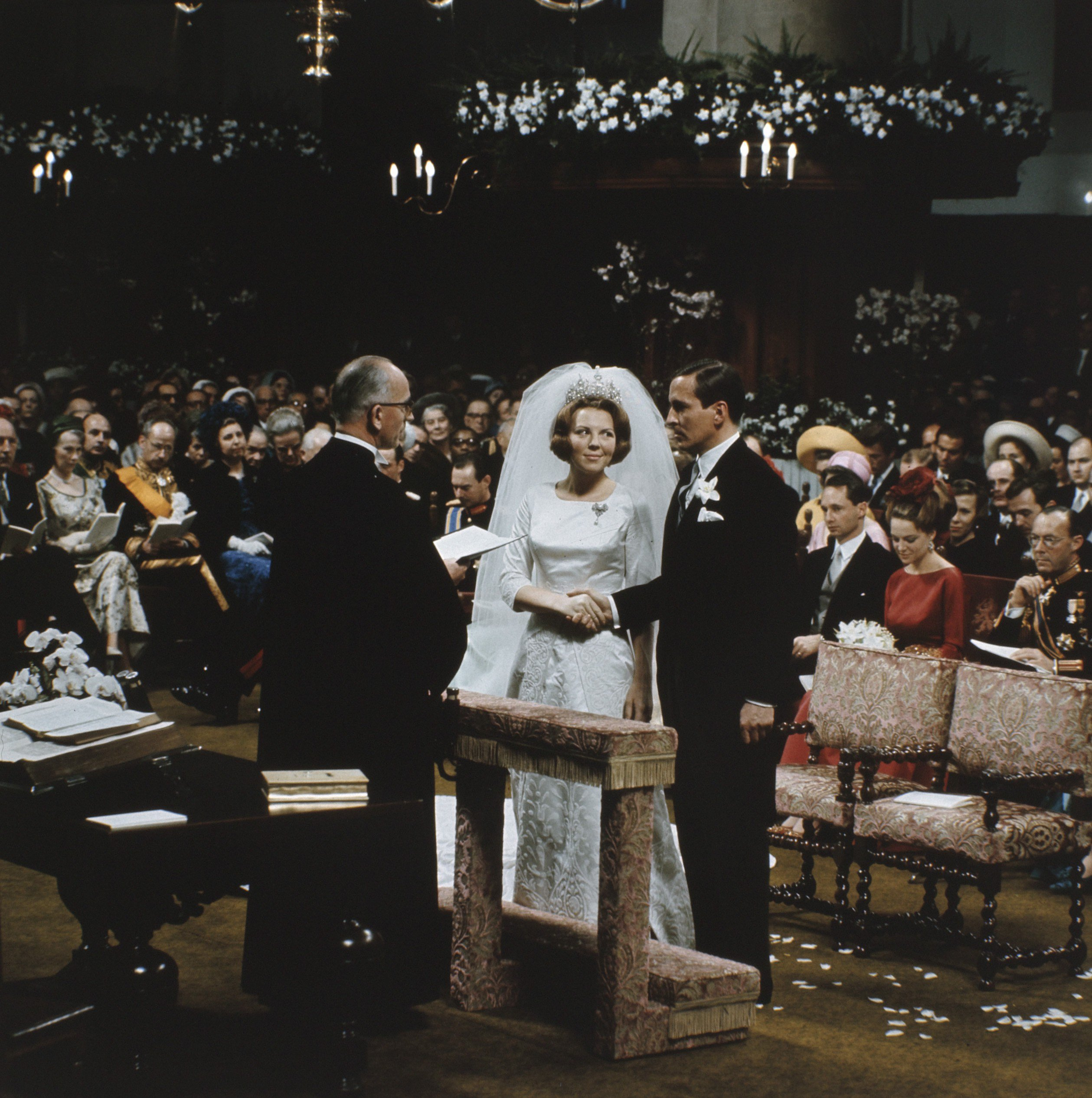
Princess Beatrix and Claus during the religious ceremony

=== Religious ceremony ===
Following the civil ceremony, the couple travelled in the Golden Coach to the Westerkerk for the religious blessing. The blessing was performed by Rev. Hendrik Jan Kater, with a sermon by Rev. Johannes Hendrik Sillevis Smitt.

=== Music ===
Dutch composer Jurriaan Andriessen, composed a piece for organ, Entrata Festiva, for the occasion. Other music at the religious ceremony included the original French version of the hymn À toi la gloire O Ressuscité with words by Edmond Louis Budry and music by George Frideric Handel, and the Prince of Denmark's March by Jeremiah Clarke.

=== Attire ===
Princess Beatrix wore a white silk duchesse gown by Caroline Bergé-Farwick of Maison Linette. Beatrix was involved in the design of the gown. Her large waist-length tulle veil was secured by the Württemberg ornate pearl tiara, a Dutch royal heirloom often thought to have been among the wedding gifts of Princess Sophie of Württemberg when she married the future William III of the Netherlands in 1839 though actually made for Queen Wilhelmina in 1897. She also wore a pearl and diamond strawberry leaf brooch from Queen Sophie.

=== Attendants ===
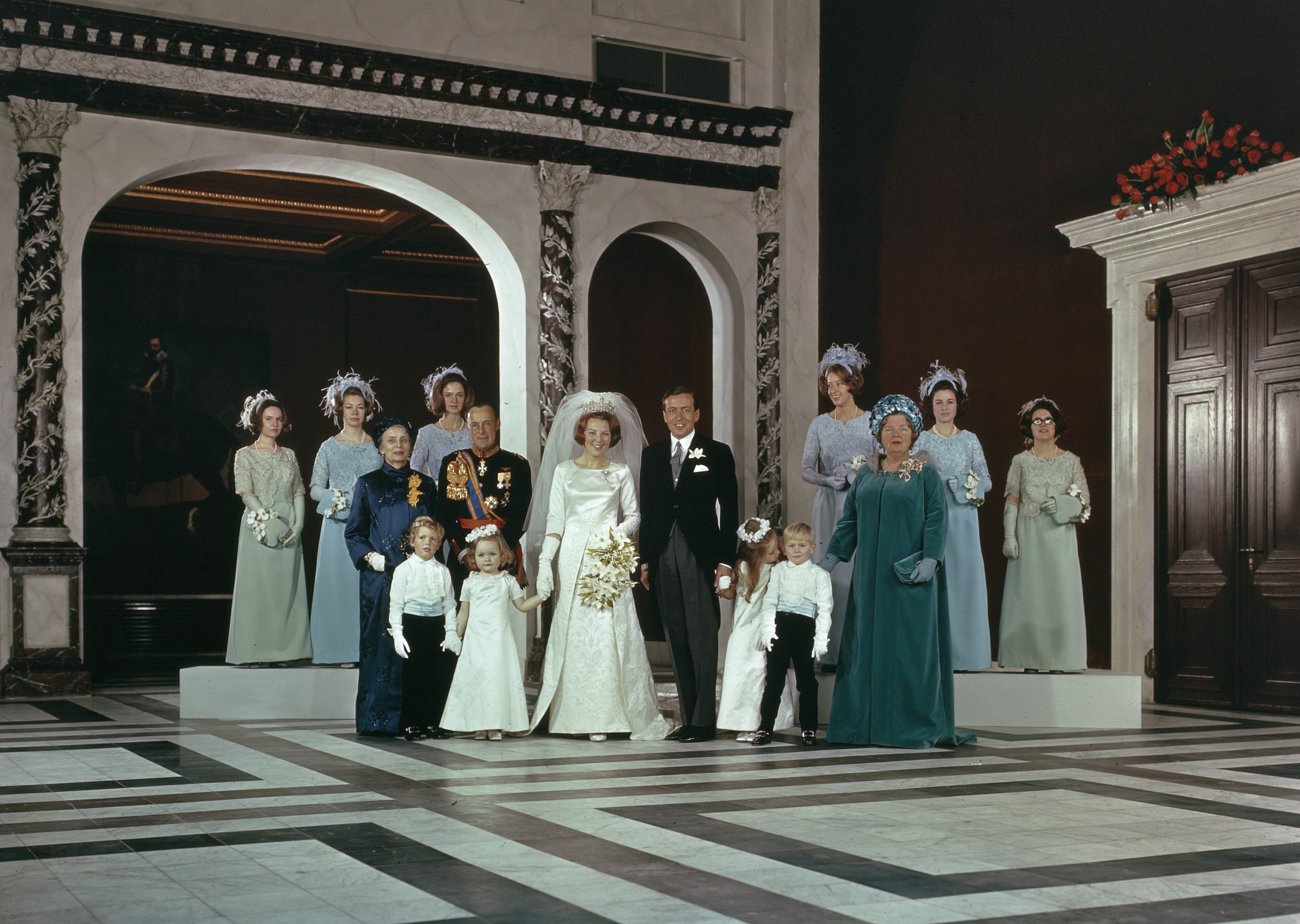
Beatrix, Claus, their parents and attendants

Princess Beatrix had six adult bridesmaids:

- Princess Christina of the Netherlands
- Christina von Amsberg
- Princess Christina of Sweden
- Lady Elizabeth Anson
- Joanna Roëll
- Eugénie Loudon

The junior bridesmaids were Daphne Stewart-Clark and Carolijn Alting von Geusau, with page boys Joachim Jencquel and Markus von Oeynhausen-Sierstorpf.

== Controversy ==
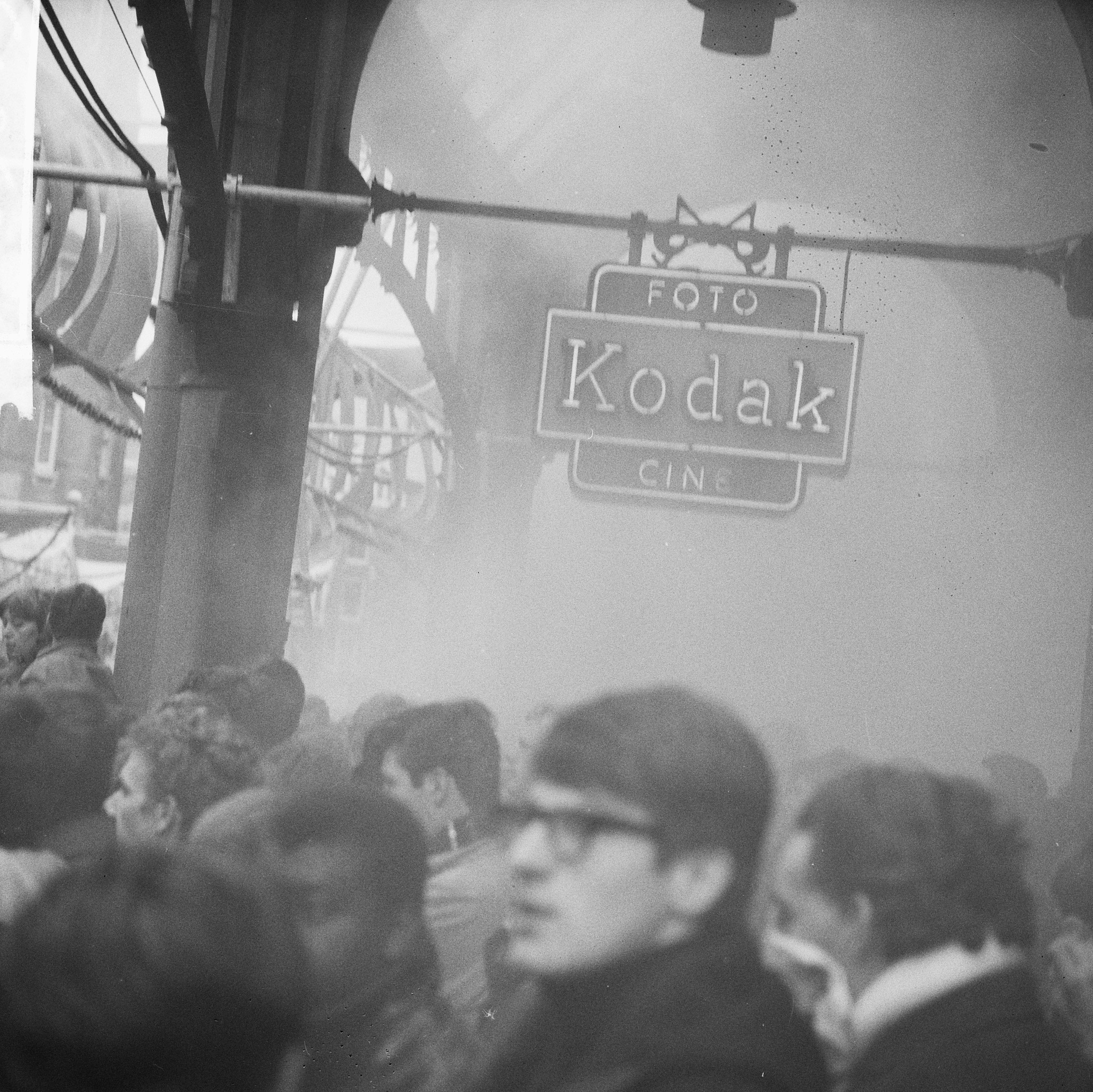
Aftermath of the smoke bomb detonated by protesters during the wedding procession

After news of the couple became public, there was intense backlash from some Dutch citizens, politicians and religious leaders due to Amsberg's German roots and membership in the Hitler Youth and the Wehrmacht during the Nazi Regime in World War II. Dutch historian Loe de Jong, then of the NIOD Institute for War, Holocaust and Genocide Studies, led a committee to look into Claus's involvement in the war. The committee cleared him and the engagement was announced.

300,000 people signed a petition against the marriage. There were protests during the wedding procession and a smoke bomb was thrown at the Golden Coach by Provos, resulting in a street battle with police. Protests included slogans like "Claus 'raus!" (Claus out!) and "Mijn fiets terug" ("Return my bicycle" – a reference to German soldiers confiscating Dutch bicycles during World War II).

In protest, half of the Amsterdam Municipal Council and three of the invited rabbis boycotted the ceremony.

== Guests ==
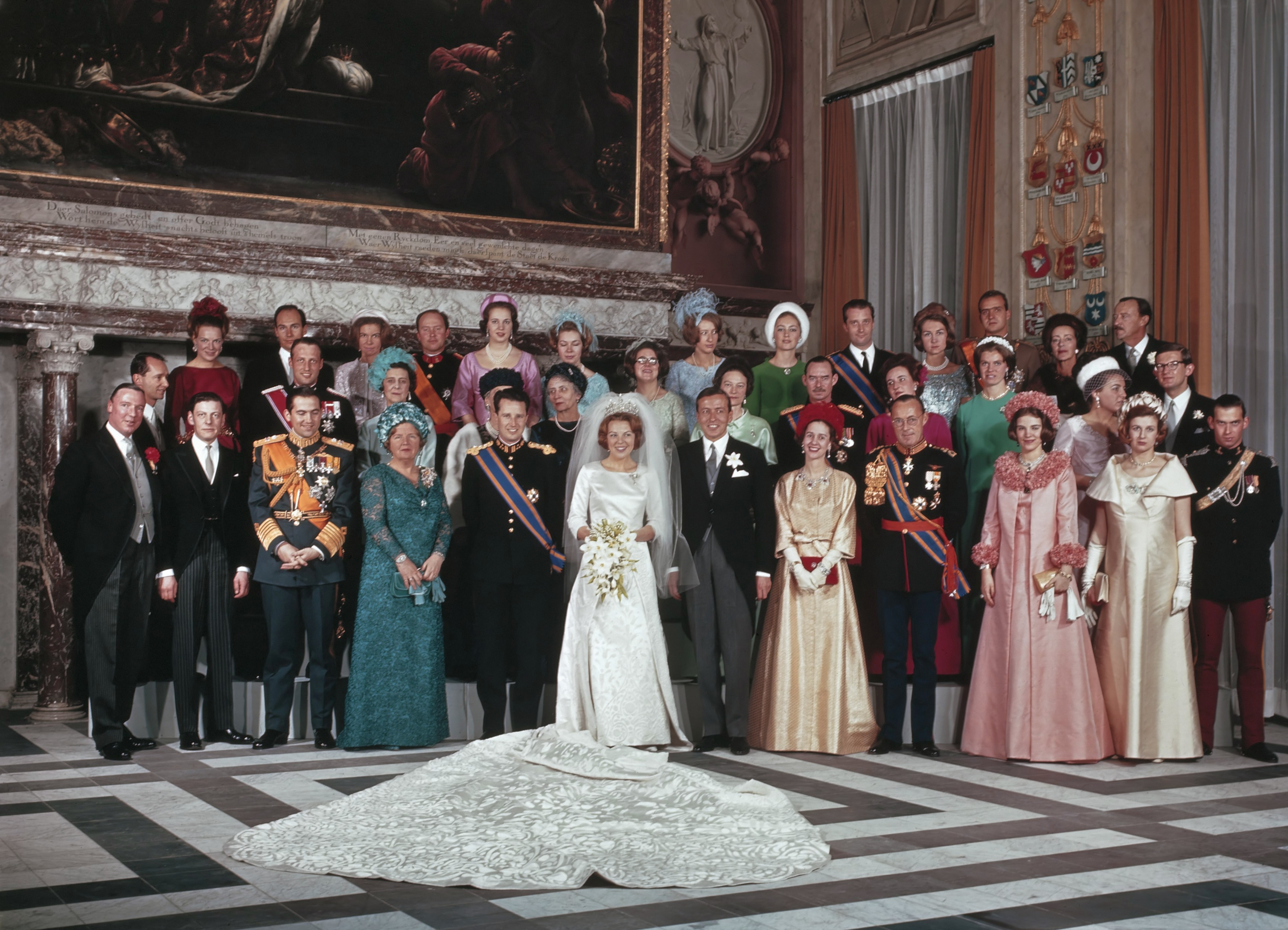
The bride and groom with their families and foreign royal guests

=== Relatives of the bride ===
- The Queen and Prince Consort of the Netherlands, the bride's parents
  - The Princess and Prince of Piacenza, the bride's sister and brother-in-law
  - Princess Margriet of the Netherlands and Mr. Pieter van Vollenhoven, the bride's sister and her fiancé
  - Princess Christina of the Netherlands, the bride's sister
- Princess Bernhard of Lippe-Biesterfeld, the bride's paternal grandmother
  - Prince and Princess Aschwin of Lippe-Biesterfeld, the bride's paternal uncle and aunt
- Duke and Duchess Adolf Friedrich of Mecklenburg-Schwerin, the bride's maternal granduncle and grandaunt
  - Princess and Prince Heinrich I Reuss of Köstritz, the bride's first cousin once removed, and her husband
    - Prince Heinrich VIII Reuss of Köstritz, the bride's second cousin

=== Relatives of the groom ===
- Baroness Gösta von Amsberg, the groom's mother
  - Christina von Amsberg, the groom's sister
- Baroness George von dem Bussche-Haddenhausen, the groom's maternal grandmother
  - Baron and Baroness Julius von dem Bussche-Haddenhausen, the groom's maternal uncle and aunt

==== Members of reigning royal houses ====
- (Belgium) The King and Queen of the Belgians
- (Belgium) The Prince and Princess of Liège
- (Kingdom of Greece) The King and Queen of the Hellenes
- (Kingdom of Greece) Princess Irene of Greece and Denmark
- The Grand Duke and Grand Duchess of Luxembourg
- Prince Charles of Luxembourg
- The Crown Prince of Norway (representing the King of Norway)
- Princess Marina, Duchess of Kent (representing the Queen of the United Kingdom)
  - (United Kingdom) Princess Alexandra, The Hon. Mrs Ogilvy, and The Hon. Angus Ogilvy
  - (United Kingdom) Prince Michael of Kent
- Princess Benedikte of Denmark (representing the King of Denmark)
- Princess Margaretha, Mrs Ambler, and Mr John Ambler (representing the King of Sweden)
- Princess Christina of Sweden

==== Members of non-reigning royal houses ====
- The Prince and Princess of Asturias
- Infanta Pilar of Spain
- Prince Friedrich Wilhelm of Prussia
- Prince Michael of Prussia
- Princess Kira of Prussia
- The Aga Khan IV

== Aftermath ==
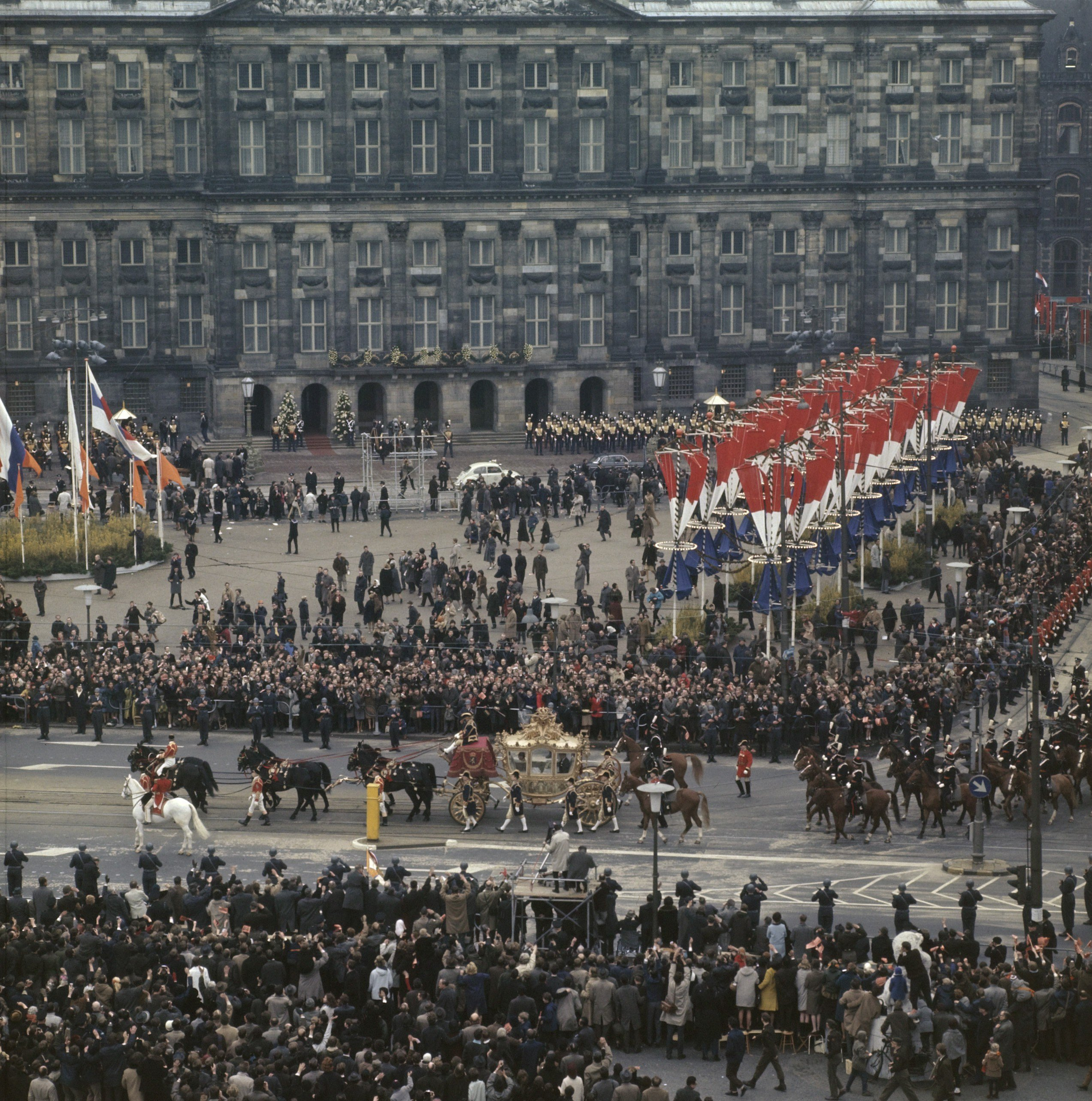
The Golden Coach in Dam Square

The couple honeymooned in Mexico. Eventually, the Dutch people accepted Claus and he became a beloved prince consort.

They had three sons: Willem-Alexander (born 1967), Friso (1968–2013) and Constantijn (born 1969). Prince Claus died of complications of pneumonia and Parkinson's disease at the Academic Medical Center in Amsterdam on 6 October 2002 after a long illness, aged 76.

== See also ==
- Wedding of Prince Willem-Alexander and Máxima Zorreguieta Cerruti
