= Klaus Felix von Amsberg =

German noble (1890–1953)

- Full name: German: Klaus Felix Friedrich Leopold Gabriel Archim Julius August von Amsberg
- Born: 1 September 1890; Rehna, Mecklenburg-Schwerin, Germany
- Died: 19 December 1953 (aged 63); Jasebeck, West Germany
- Family: Amsberg
- Spouse: Baroness Gösta von dem Bussche-Haddenhausen (m. 1924)
- Issue: Sigrid Jencquel; Prince Claus of the Netherlands; Rixa Ahrens; Margit Grubitz; Barbara Haarhaus; Theda von Friesen; Christina von der Recke
- Father: Wilhelm von Amsberg
- Mother: Elise von Vieregge

Klaus Felix von Amsberg (German: Klaus Felix Friedrich Leopold Gabriel Archim Julius August von Amsberg; 1 September 1890 – 19 December 1953) was a member of the German Niederer Adel (lower nobility) and father of Prince Claus of the Netherlands.

== Early life ==
He was born at Rehna, Mecklenburg-Schwerin, German Empire (now Mecklenburg-Vorpommern, Germany), the first child of Wilhelm von Amsberg (1856–1929), by his marriage to Elise von Vieregg (1866–1951), member of an old aristocratic family.

In World War I he fought as a German officer in the Imperial German Army at the side of General Paul von Lettow-Vorbeck in German East Africa.

Claus was from 1917 the steward of an estate after a failed venture in Africa as a planter.

In 1928 he moved with his family to the Tanganyika Territory (now Tanzania), where he remained during the outbreak of World War II as the manager of an Anglo-German tea and sisal plantation. He returned to Germany in 1947.

== Marriage ==
Claus married on 4 September 1924 at Hitzacker to Baroness Gösta von dem Bussche-Haddenhausen (26 January 1902 – 13 June 1996), daughter of Baron Georg von dem Bussche-Haddenhausen (1869–1923) and Baroness Gabriele von dem Bussche-Ippenburg (1877–1973).

Together they had six daughters and one son:

- Sigrid von Amsberg (Hitzacker-Dötzingen, 26 June 1925 – 1 April 2018), married in 1952 to Ascan-Bernd Jencquel (17 August 1913 – 4 November 2003), had issue.
- Claus von Amsberg (Hitzacker-Dötzingen, 6 September 1926 – Amsterdam, 6 October 2002), married in 1966 to Beatrix of the Netherlands (b. 31 January 1938), had issue (including Willem-Alexander of the Netherlands).
- Rixa von Amsberg (Hitzacker-Dötzingen, 18 November 1927 – 6 January 2010), married in 1960 to Peter Georg Ahrens (27 April 1920 – 11 March 2011), no issue.
- Margit von Amsberg (Bumbuli, 16 October 1930 – 1988), married in 1964 to Ernst Grubitz (14 April 1931 – 5 June 2009), had issue.
- Barbara von Amsberg (Bumbuli, 16 October 1930), married in 1963 to Günther Haarhaus (22 October 1921 – 9 February 2007), had issue.
- Theda von Amsberg (Tanga, 30 June 1939 – Steinbach (Taunus), 24 April 2024), married in 1966 to Baron Karl von Friesen (b. 1933), had issue.
- Christina von Amsberg (Salisbury, 20 January 1945), married in 1971 to Baron Hans Hubertus von der Recke (b. 1942), had issue.

He died, aged 63, in Jasebeck, West Germany, of a heart attack.

== Ancestry ==
Ancestors of Klaus Felix von Amsberg

16. Joachim von Amsberg
8. Joachim von Amsberg
17. Sophie Fritze
4. Gabriel von Amsberg
18. Johann Bernitt
9. Anna Bernitt
19. Catharina Groning
2. Wilhelm von Amsberg
20. Christian von Passow
10. Wilhelm von Passow
21. Louise von Meding
5. Marie von Passow
22. August von Bülow
11. Auguste von Bülow
23. Friederike von Bassewitz
1. Claus Felix von Amsberg
24. Frederik von Vieregge
12. Matthias von Vieregge
25. Ernestine von Both
6. Leopold von Vieregge
26. Baron Adolf von Oldershausen
13. Baroness Elise von Oldershausen
27. Friederike von Wurmb
3. Elise von Vieregge
28. Baron Johann von Gutschmid
14. Baron Felix von Gutschmidt
29. Auguste von Burgsdorff
7. Baroness Agnes von Gutschmid
30. Count Friedrich von Bassewitz
15. Countess Cäcilie von Bassewitz
31. Countess Auguste von Schlippenbach

== Notes and sources ==
- thePeerage.com - Claus von Amsberg
- Die Ahnen Claus Georg von Amsberg, Limburg a.d.Lahn, 1966, Euler, F. W., Reference: 2
- Het huwelijk van H.K.H.Prinses Beatrix, Zaltbommel, 1966, Banning, Mr. Dr. Drs. J. P. D. van, Reference: 65
