= Wedding of Prince Willem-Alexander and Máxima Zorreguieta =

2002 Dutch royal wedding

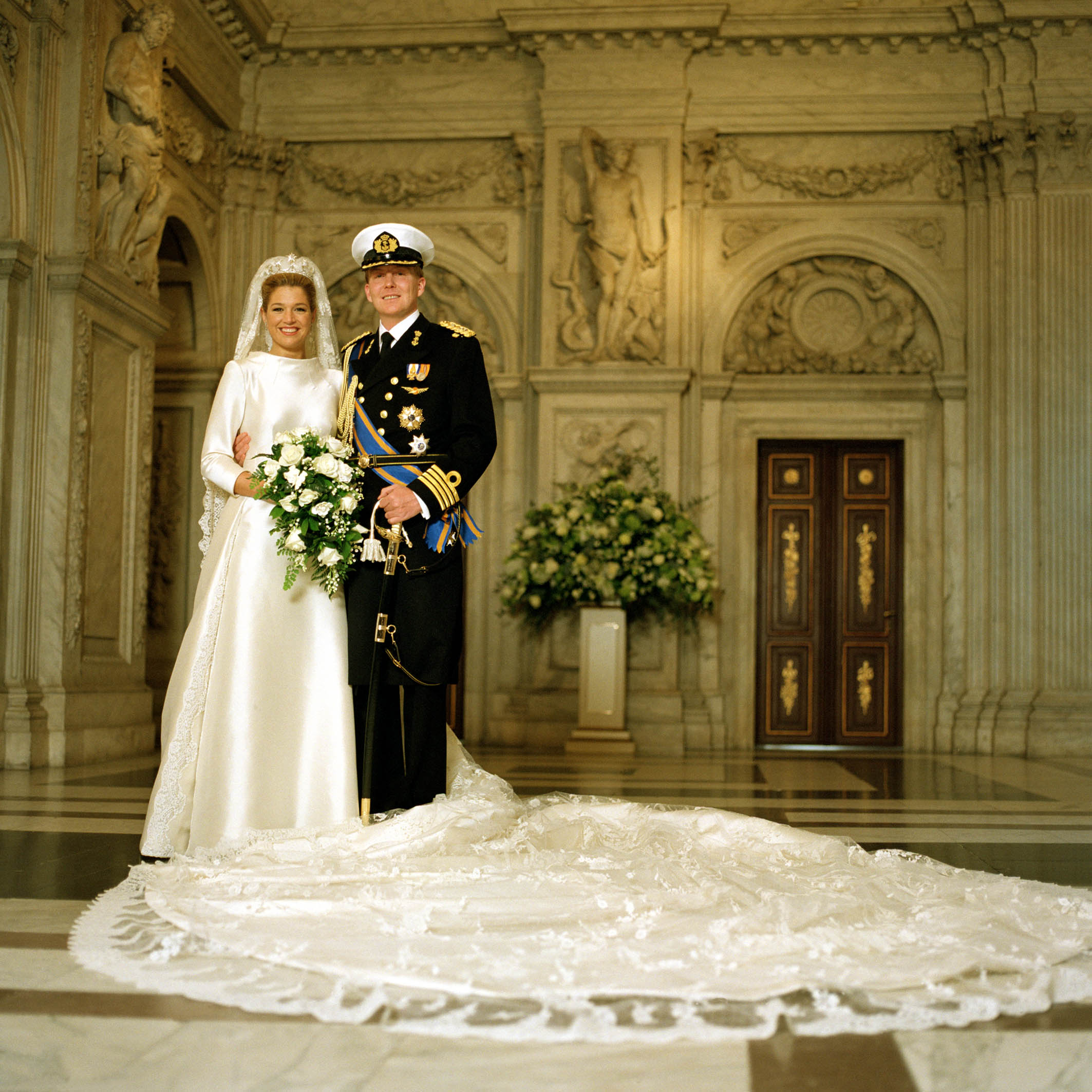
- Willem-Alexander and Máxima on their wedding day
- Date: 2 February 2002
- Location: Beurs van Berlage Nieuwe Kerk, Amsterdam
- Participants: Willem-Alexander, Prince of Orange; Máxima Zorreguieta

The wedding of Willem-Alexander, Prince of Orange, and Máxima Zorreguieta took place on 2 February 2002 at the Nieuwe Kerk, Amsterdam. Willem-Alexander and Máxima became king and queen on 30 April 2013 after the abdication of his mother, Beatrix.

== Engagement ==
Willem-Alexander, Prince of Orange, eldest son and heir of Queen Beatrix and Prince Claus, met Argentine-born Máxima Zorreguieta at the Seville Fair in April 1999. He did not introduce himself as a prince, and when she later found out, she thought he was joking. Two weeks later, they met again in New York, where Máxima was working as a banker for Kleinwort Benson. She did not meet his parents, Queen Beatrix and Prince Claus, for some time.

As speed skating is one of the most popular sports, and Willem-Alexander is a good speed skater, he proposed to Máxima on the ice on skates. A week earlier, Willem-Alexander already told his mother and Prime Minister Wim Kok that he would propose to Máxima soon. He endlessly practiced the question, he told in an interview later. With hidden champagne and red roses by the pond of Huis ten Bosch, he invited Máxima to go ice skating. While on the ice of the pond he proposed to her in English, "to make sure she would understand it". Máxima was surprised but answered directly with "yes".

The intention was that the intended marriage remained a secret, so as not to get in the way of Willem-Alexander's brother Constantijn and Laurentien Brinkhorst, who would marry in May. Ultimately, it was too difficult to keep secret, so on 30 March 2001, Queen Beatrix announced her eldest son's engagement. On 21 May 2001, the bill seeking consent for the marriage was introduced in parliament. On 7 January 2002, the ondertrouw was published.

Zorreguieta became a naturalized Dutch citizen, though she did not convert from Roman Catholicism. It was announced any children born of the marriage would be titled Prince/Princess of the Netherlands and Prince/Princess of Orange-Nassau, with the style of Royal Highness.

== Controversy ==
During the National Reorganization Process, Argentina's most recent dictatorship, Jorge Zorreguieta, Máxima's father, served as Secretary of Agriculture, Livestock, and Fisheries. During this regime, an estimated 10,000–30,000 people were kidnapped and murdered during this and subsequent military regimes before democracy was restored to Argentina in 1983. Zorreguieta claimed he was unaware of the Dirty War while he was a cabinet minister.

At the request of the States General, Michiel Baud, a Dutch professor in Latin American studies, carried out an inquiry into the involvement of Zorreguieta in the Dirty War. Baud determined that Máxima's father had not been directly involved in any of the numerous atrocities that took place during that period. However, Baud also concluded that Zorreguieta was almost certainly aware of them; in Baud's view, it was highly unlikely that a cabinet minister would not have known about them.

Jorge Zorreguieta's presence at the wedding was debated for months. It was eventually concluded he would not attend. In solidarity, her mother chose not to attend.

== Pre-wedding celebrations ==
On 31 January, Queen Beatrix's 64th birthday, there was a black-tie dinner and ball at the Royal Palace of Amsterdam for 500 guests to celebrate the impending wedding and The Queen's birthday.

The day before the wedding, there was a lunch and concert at the Royal Concertgebouw attended by 1,600 guests. That evening, the couple attend an event organized by the National Orange Committee and the municipality of Amsterdam in the Amsterdam ArenA. About 50,000 people from every Dutch municipality were invited.

== Wedding ==
=== Civil ceremony ===
Per Dutch law, the couple were first required to be married in a civil ceremony. This was performed by Job Cohen, Mayor of Amsterdam, at the Beurs van Berlage prior to the religious ceremony. The civil ceremony was attended by friends and family of the couple, dignitaries and some 600 invited guests.

Witnesses for the Prince of Orange were his brother, Prince Constantijn, and friends Marc ter Haar and Frank Houben. Witnesses for Zorreguieta Cerruti were her new mother-in-law, Queen Beatrix, her aunt, Marcela Cerruti Carricart, and her brother, Martín Zorreguieta Cerruti.

=== Religious ceremony ===
The Dutch Reformed Church ceremony took place in the Nieuwe Kerk, Amsterdam. The Reverend Carel ter Linden, Minister Emeritus of the Kloosterkerk, The Hague, officiated.

==== Music ====
Music during the service was provided by Bernard Winsemius, organist, Miranda van Kralingen, soprano, the Nederlands Kamerkoor and the Royal Concertgebouw Orchestra, conducted by Ed Spanjaard.

Prior to the service, pieces by Böhm, Bach and Scheidemann were played on the organ. The bride and groom entered the church together to Entrata Festiva, which was composed by Dutch composer Jurriaan Andriessen for the wedding of Prince Willem-Alexander's parents in 1966. Throughout the service, a number of Dutch hymns were sung. Kyrie from Mozart's Mass in C major, K. 337 "Solemnis" and Schubert's Ave Maria were also performed. The recessional was "Hallelujah" from Handel's Messiah.

In honour of the bride's parents, who were absent, Adiós Nonino, an Argentine tango by Astor Piazzolla was played.

=== Attendants ===
The bride was attended by four adult bridesmaids:

- Valeria Delger, the bride's childhood friend
- Juliana Guillermo, the groom's maternal first cousin
- Baroness Theresa von der Recke, the groom's paternal first cousin
- Inés Zorreguieta, the bride's sister

Two child bridesmaids:

- Princess Pauline of Sayn-Wittgenstein-Hohenstein
- Countess Leonie of Waldburg-Zeil-Hohenems

Four pageboys:

- Jonkheer Paulo Alting von Geusau
- Baron Johann-Casper von dem Bussche-Haddenhausen
- Mr Alexandre Friling
- Mr Floris ter Haar

=== Clothing ===
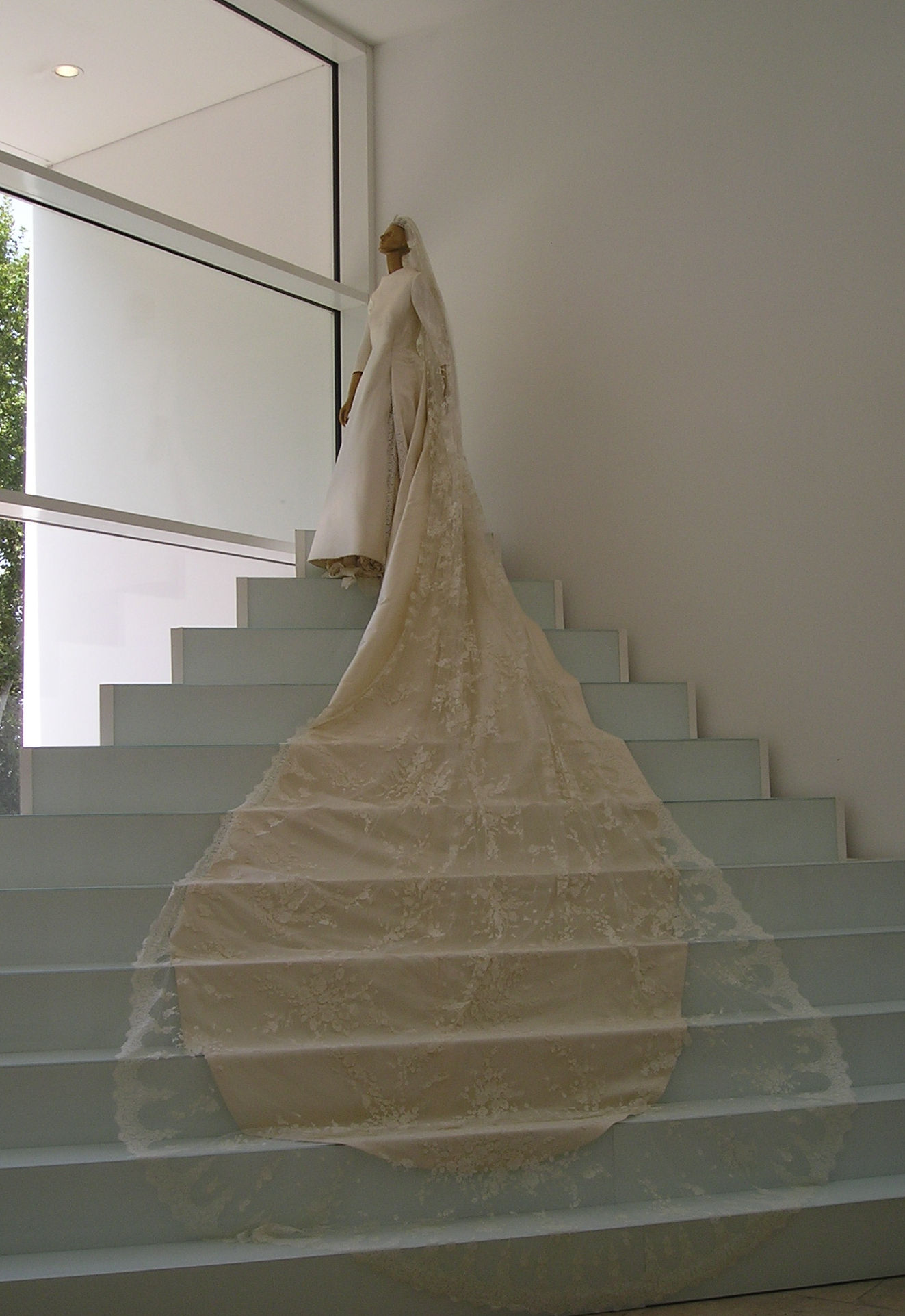
Máxima's gown on display at the Museum of the Ara Pacis, 2007

The bride wore a gown of ivory mikado silk, with a cowl neckline, three-quarter sleeves and a five-metre-long train designed and created by Valentino. The skirt was inset with panels of embroidered lace at the sides, flaring slightly from a close-fitting empire-line bodice. Her veil, also a Valentino creation, was of silk tulle and hand-embroidered with a flower and tendril motifs. The court jeweller adapted the Dutch Pearl Button Tiara by exchanging the pearl buttons with five diamond stars which belonged to Queen Emma. The bride carried a cascading bouquet of white roses, gardenias, lilies of the valley and two kinds of foliage.

The Prince wore the full dress uniform of a captain in the Royal Netherlands Navy. He wore the riband and star of a Knight Grand Gross of the Order of the Netherlands Lion, the star of a Knight of the Order of the Gold Lion of the House of Nassau, the Officers' Cross and the Queen Beatrix Inauguration Medal, 1980.

=== Procession and reception ===
After the service, the bride and groom drove through the Nieuwezijds Voorburgwal, Spui, Singel, Muntplein and the Rokin in the Golden Coach. The couple then returned to the Royal Palace and appeared on the balcony above Dam Square. They then proceeded to a luncheon reception.

== Guests ==
=== Relatives of the groom ===
==== House of Orange-Nassau ====
- The Queen and the Prince Consort, the groom's parents
  - Prince Johan-Friso, the groom's brother
  - Prince Constantijn and Princess Laurentien, the groom's brother and sister-in-law
- Prince Bernhard, the groom's maternal grandfather
  - Princess Irene and The Duke of Parma, the groom's maternal aunt and her ex-husband
    - Prince Carlos, the groom's first cousin
    - Prince Jaime, the groom's first cousin
    - Princess Carolina, the groom's first cousin
  - Princess Margriet and Mr Pieter van Vollenhoven, the groom's maternal aunt and uncle
    - Prince Maurits and Princess Marilène of Orange-Nassau, van Vollenhoven, the groom's first cousin and his wife
    - Prince Bernhard and Princess Annette of Orange-Nassau, van Vollenhoven, the groom's first cousin and his wife
    - Prince Pieter-Christiaan of Orange-Nassau, van Vollenhoven, the groom's first cousin
    - Prince Floris of Orange-Nassau, van Vollenhoven, the groom's first cousin
  - Princess Christina, the groom's maternal aunt
    - Mr Bernardo Guillermo, the groom's first cousin
    - Mr Nicolás Guillermo, the groom's first cousin
    - Miss Juliana Guillermo, the groom's first cousin (bridesmaid)

==== House of Amsberg ====
- Jonkvrouw Sigrid Jencquel, the groom's paternal aunt
  - Mr and Mrs Joachim Jencquel, the groom's first cousin and his wife
- Baroness Theda and Baron Karl von Friesen, the groom's paternal aunt and uncle
  - Baron Alexander von Friesen, the groom's first cousin
  - Baroness Renate von Friesen, the groom's first cousin
  - Baroness Isabell von Friesen, the groom's first cousin
- Baroness Christina and Baron Hans von der Recke, the groom's paternal aunt and uncle
  - Baroness Katinka von der Recke, the groom's first cousin
  - Baroness Sophie von der Recke, the groom's first cousin
  - Baroness Theresa von der Recke, the groom's first cousin (bridesmaid)

=== Relatives of the bride ===
Due to the controversy surrounding her father's alleged involvement in Argentina's Dirty War, the bride's father, Jorge Zorreguieta, was not invited. In solidarity with her husband, the bride's mother, María del Carmen Cerruti Carricart, chose not to attend.

- Mr and Mrs Martín Zorreguieta Cerruti, the bride's brother and sister-in-law
- Mr Juan Zorreguieta Cerruti, the bride's brother
- Miss Inés Zorreguieta Cerruti, the bride's sister (bridesmaid)
- Mrs María and Mr Adrián Vojnov, the bride's half-sister and brother-in-law
- Miss Ángeles Zorreguieta López Gil, the bride's half-sister
- Mrs Dolores and Mr Harmond Grad Lewis, the bride's half-sister and brother-in-law
- Mrs Marcela Cerruti Carricart, the bride's maternal aunt

=== Foreign royal guests ===
==== Members of reigning royal houses ====
- The King and Queen of the Belgians
  - (Belgium) The Duke and Duchess of Brabant
  - Princess Astrid and Prince Lorenz of Belgium
  - Prince Laurent of Belgium and Miss Claire Coombs
- The Queen of Denmark
  - The Crown Prince of Denmark
- The Crown Prince of Japan (representing the Emperor of Japan)
- Queen Noor of Jordan (representing the King of Jordan)
- Prince Hassan bin Talal and Princess Sarvath al-Hassan of Jordan
  - Princess Sumaya bint Hassan of Jordan and Mr Nasser Judeh
  - Princess Badiya bint Hassan of Jordan
  - Prince Rashid bin Hassan of Jordan
- The Hereditary Prince and Hereditary Princess of Liechtenstein (representing the Prince of Liechtenstein)
- The Grand Duke and Grand Duchess of Luxembourg
  - The Hereditary Grand Duke of Luxembourg
- Grand Duke Jean and Grand Duchess Joséphine Charlotte of Luxembourg
  - Prince Guillaume and Princess Sibilla of Luxembourg
- The Hereditary Prince of Monaco (representing the Prince of Monaco)
- Prince Moulay Rachid of Morocco (representing the King of Morocco)
- The King and Queen of Norway
  - Princess Märtha Louise of Norway and Mr Ari Behn
  - The Crown Prince and Crown Princess of Norway
- The Queen of Spain (representing the King of Spain)
  - (Spain) The Duchess and Duke of Palma de Mallorca
  - (Spain) The Prince of Asturias
- The King and Queen of Sweden
  - The Crown Princess of Sweden
  - (Sweden) The Duke of Värmland
  - (Sweden) The Duchess of Hälsingland and Gästrikland
- The Prince of Wales (representing the Queen of the United Kingdom and Commonwealth Realms)
- (United Kingdom) The Earl and Countess of Wessex

==== Members of non-reigning royal houses ====
- The Aga Khan and Begum Aga Khan
- The Prince and Princess of Turnovo
- King Constantine II and Queen Anne-Marie of the Hellenes
  - Crown Prince and Crown Princess Pavlos of Greece
  - Prince Nikolaos of Greece and Denmark
- The Prince and Princess of Hanover
- Prince Philipp of Hesse
- The Prince and Princess of Sayn-Wittgenstein-Berleburg
  - The Hereditary Prince of Sayn-Wittgenstein-Berleburg
  - Princess Alexandra, Countess of Pfeil und Klein-Ellguth and Count Jefferson von Pfeil und Klein-Ellguth
  - Princess Nathalie of Sayn-Wittgenstein-Berleburg
- The Prince and Princess of Sayn-Wittgenstein-Sayn
- The Prince and Princess of Waldeck and Pyrmont

=== Politicians ===
==== Dutch politicians ====
- Wim Kok, Prime Minister
- Gerrit Braks, President of the Senate
- Jeltje van Nieuwenhoven, Speaker of the House of Representatives
- Job Cohen, Mayor of Amsterdam
- Wim Deetman, Mayor of The Hague
- Ivo Opstelten, Mayor of Rotterdam
- A. H. Brouwer-Korf, Mayor of Utrecht

==== Foreign politicians ====
- Kofi and Nane Annan, Secretary-General of the United Nations and his wife
- Nelson Mandela and Graça Machel, former President of South Africa and his wife
- (Australia) James Wolfensohn, President of the World Bank Group

=== Other notable guests ===
- Valentino Garavani, designer of the bride's gown

== Aftermath ==
Per a decree issued on 25 January 2002, upon the solemnization of marriage, Máxima became formally titled "Her Royal Highness Princess Máxima of the Netherlands, Princess of Orange-Nassau, Mrs. van Amsberg." She did not, however, become Princess consort of Orange.

The newlyweds honeymooned in St. Moritz, after a brief layover in London to visit with the bride's parents. They then proceeded to Argentina and New Zealand.

The couple have three daughters, Catharina-Amalia, Alexia and Ariane.
