= Prince Claus of the Netherlands =

Prince consort of the Netherlands from 1980 to 2002

Claus von Amsberg
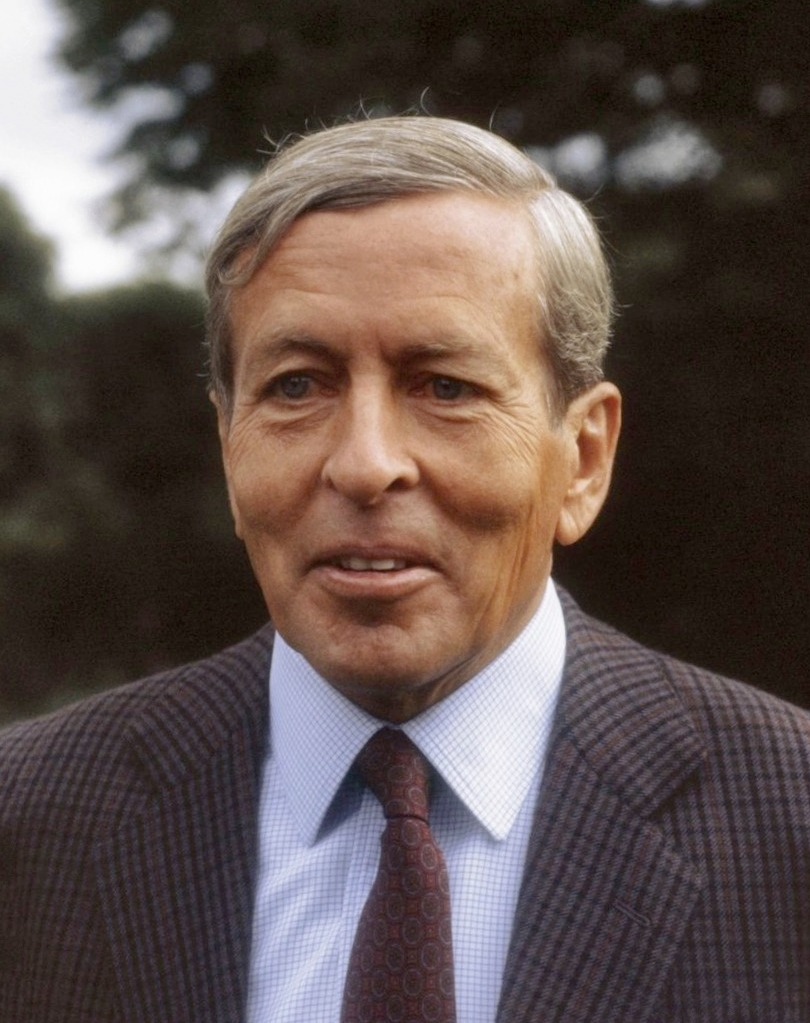
- Claus in 1986

Prince consort of the Netherlands
- Tenure: 30 April 1980 – 6 October 2002
- Born: Klaus-Georg Wilhelm Otto Friedrich Gerd von Amsberg; 6 September 1926; Hitzacker, Germany
- Died: 6 October 2002 (aged 76); Bijlmermeer, Netherlands
- Burial: 15 October 2002; Nieuwe Kerk, Delft, Netherlands
- Spouse: Beatrix of the Netherlands (m. 1966)
- Issue: Willem-Alexander of the Netherlands; Prince Friso; Prince Constantijn
- House: Amsberg
- Father: Claus Felix von Amsberg
- Mother: Baroness Gösta von dem Bussche-Haddenhausen
- Occupation: Diplomat; Civil servant

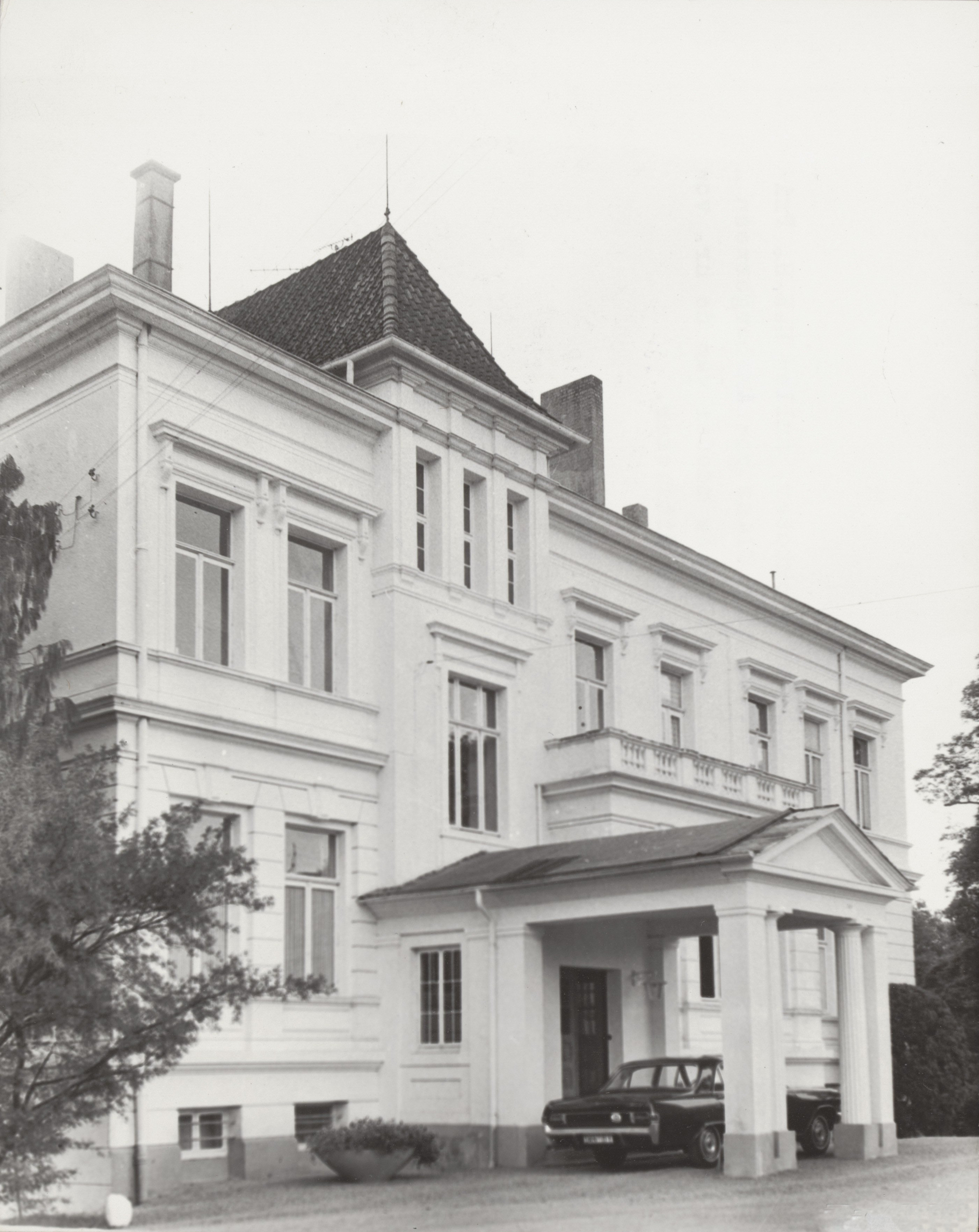
Schloss Dötzingen, birthplace of Claus von Amsberg

Prince Claus of the Netherlands, Jonkheer van Amsberg (born Klaus-Georg Wilhelm Otto Friedrich Gerd von Amsberg; 6 September 1926 – 6 October 2002) was Prince of the Netherlands from 30 April 1980 until his death on 6 October 2002, as the husband of Queen Beatrix.

Initially a diplomat in the service of West Germany and West German deputy ambassador to Ivory Coast, Claus met Beatrix on New Year's Eve 1963 and married her in 1966. When his wife ascended to the throne in 1980, Claus took his place as Prince of the Netherlands, which he held until his death in 2002.

== Biography ==
Klaus-Georg Wilhelm Otto Friedrich Gerd von Amsberg was born on his mother's family's estate, Schloss Dötzingen, Hitzacker, Germany, on 6 September 1926. He was the second child and only son of Claus Felix von Amsberg and his wife, Baroness Gösta von dem Bussche-Haddenhausen. His father, by birth a member of House of Amsberg which belonged to the untitled German nobility from Mecklenburg, operated a large farm in Tanganyika (formerly German East Africa) from 1928 until World War II. His mother belonged to the ancient von dem Bussche noble family which originated from the County of Ravensberg. From 1938, Claus and his six sisters grew up on their maternal grandmother's estate in Lower Saxony; he attended the Friderico-Francisceum-Gymnasium in Bad Doberan from 1933 to 1936 and a boarding school in Tanganyika from 1936 to 1938.

Claus was a member of such Nazi youth organisations as Deutsches Jungvolk and the Hitler Youth. From 1938 until 1942, he attended the German Baltenschule Misdroy in what is now Międzyzdroje, Poland.

In 1944, Claus was conscripted into the German Wehrmacht, becoming a soldier in the German 90th Panzergrenadier Division in Italy in March 1945. He was taken prisoner of war by the American forces at Meran before taking part in any fighting. After his repatriation, he finished school in Lüneburg and studied law in Hamburg. He then joined the German diplomatic corps and worked in Santo Domingo and Ivory Coast. In the 1960s, he was transferred to Bonn.

Claus met Princess Beatrix for the first time on New Year's Eve 1963 in Bad Driburg at a dinner hosted by the Count von Oeynhausen-Sierstorpff, who was a distant relative of both of them. Claus and Beatrix were also distantly related (5th cousins twice removed), as both being descendants from von dem Bussche family. They met again at the wedding-eve party of Princess Tatjana of Sayn-Wittgenstein-Berleburg and Moritz, Landgrave of Hesse, in the summer of 1964. With memories of German oppression still very strong 20 years after the war, sections of the Dutch population were unhappy that Beatrix's fiancé was a German and former member of the Hitler Youth. Nonetheless, Queen Juliana gave the engagement her blessing after giving serious thought to canceling it. The engagement was approved by the States-General—a necessary step for Beatrix to remain in the line of succession to the throne—in 1965. He was granted Dutch citizenship later that year and changed the spellings of his names to Dutch.

The couple were married on 10 March 1966. Their wedding day saw violent protests, most notably by the anarchist-artist group Provo. They included such memorable slogans as "Claus, 'raus!" (Claus, get out!) and "Mijn fiets terug" (Give me back my bike), a reference to the memory of occupying German soldiers confiscating Dutch bicycles. A smoke bomb was thrown at the wedding carriage by a group of Provos. For a time, it was thought that Beatrix would be the last monarch of the Netherlands.

However, over time, Claus became accepted by the public, so much so that during the last part of his life he was considered by some to be the most popular member of the royal family. This change in Dutch opinion was brought about by Claus's strong motivation to contribute to public causes (especially Third World development, on which he was considered an expert), his sincere modesty and his candor (within but sometimes on the edge of royal protocol).

The public also sympathised with Claus for his efforts to give meaning to his life beyond the restrictions that Dutch law imposed on the royal family's freedom of speech and action. However, these restrictions were gradually loosened; Claus was even appointed as senior staff member at the Department of Developing Aid, albeit in an advisory role.

One example of his attitude toward protocol was the "Declaration of the Tie". In 1998, after presenting the annual Prince Claus Awards to three African fashion designers, Claus told "workers of all nations to unite and cast away the new shackles they have voluntarily cast upon themselves", meaning the necktie, that "snake around my neck," and encouraged the audience to "venture into open-collar paradise". He then removed his tie and threw it on the floor.

Claus battled depression for a number of years, and underwent surgery in 1998 to remove his prostate. In 2001, he underwent another surgery to remove one of his kidneys. He eventually died on 6 October 2002 from Parkinson's disease and heart failure.

=== Activities ===
As a husband of the heir, Claus was a member of the National Advisory Council for Development Cooperation and its Bureau, and was a chair of the National Committee for Development Strategy 1970‑1980 and the Netherlands Development Organization. He also worked as special advisor to the Minister for Development Cooperation. He held these positions until 1980.

On 30 April 1980, Claus' mother-in-law, Queen Juliana, abdicated in favour of Princess Beatrix, who became Queen of the Netherlands. After the investiture, the couple visited the Netherlands Antilles and Aruba. As a prince consort, Prince Claus frequently visited public organisations, commercial and industrial enterprises, and companies in the agriculture and fisheries sector.

In 1984, Claus became the Inspector General for Development Cooperation, member of the Board of Directors of De Nederlandsche Bank N.V. (until 1998), member of the Board of Directors of Royal PTT Nederland, and Chair of the Transport and Public Works Platform.

Claus was an honorary chair of the National Coordinating Committee for the Protection of Monuments and Historic Buildings and the King William I Foundation. He was also a patron of the Concertgebouw Orchestra and Scouting Netherlands.

On Claus' seventieth birthday, the Prince Claus Fund for Culture and Development was established on the initiative of the Dutch government. The fund focused on enhancing understanding of cultures and promoting interaction between culture and development.

=== Declining health and death ===
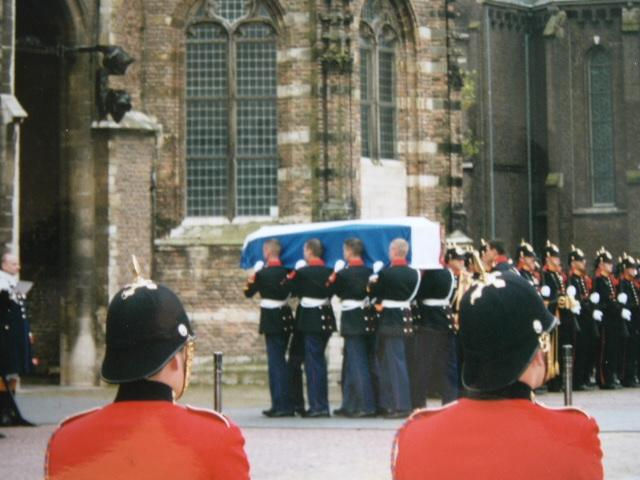
Funeral of Prince Claus

Claus suffered various health problems, such as depression, cancer and Parkinson's disease. He died of complications of pneumonia and Parkinson's at the Academic Medical Center in Amsterdam on 6 October 2002 after a long illness, aged 76. He died less than four months after the birth of his first grandchild. He died before both of his parents-in-law, Queen Juliana, who died in March 2004, and Prince Bernhard, who died in December 2004.

Claus's funeral was held on 15 October 2002 at the Nieuwe Kerk in Delft and was the first full state funeral for a member of the Dutch royal family since Queen Wilhelmina's in 1962. His coffin was carried in a procession from Noordeinde Palace in The Hague to Delft, accompanied by a military guard of honour. The service was led by the Rev. Carel ter Linden, with a personal tribute by Claus's friend Huub Oosterhuis, before Claus was interred in the royal family vault beneath the Nieuwe Kerk.

== Titles, styles, honours, and arms ==
Standard of Claus as Prince-consort of the Netherlands.

Royal monogram

Coat of arms of Prince Claus of the Netherlands

=== Titles ===
- 6 September 1926 – 16 February 1966: Klaus von Amsberg
- 16 February 1966 – 10 March 1966: Claus van Amsberg
- 10 March 1966 – 30 April 1980: His Royal Highness Prince Claus of the Netherlands, Jonkheer van Amsberg
- 30 April 1980 – 6 October 2002: His Royal Highness The Prince of the Netherlands

=== Honours ===
==== National ====
- Netherlands:
  - Knight Grand Cross of the Order of the Netherlands Lion (1966)
  - Recipient of the Cross Medal of Nijmegen Marching Proficiency
  - Recipient of the Queen Beatrix Inauguration Medal
  - Recipient of the Wedding Medal of Prince Willem-Alexander, Prince of Orange and Maxima Zorreguieta

==== Foreign ====
- Austria:
  - Grand Star of the Decoration of Honour for Services to the Republic of Austria (1994)
- Denmark:
  - Knight of the Order of the Elephant (29 October 1975)
- (Ethiopia) Ethiopian imperial family:
  - Grand Cordon of the Order of the Queen of Sheba (1969)
- France:
  - Grand Cross of the Order of the Legion of Honour (1984)
- Germany:
  - Grand Cross Special Class of the Order of Merit of the Federal Republic of Germany (1 March 1983)
- Iceland:
  - Grand Cross of the Order of the Falcon (1994)
- Italy:
  - Knight Grand Cross with Collar of the Order of Merit of the Italian Republic (27 March 1985)
- Ivory Coast:
  - Grand Cross of the National Order of the Ivory Coast (1973)
- Japan:
  - Grand Cordon of the Order of the Chrysanthemum (2000)
- Norway:
  - Grand Cross with Collar of the Order of Saint Olav (1968)
- Portugal:
  - Grand Cross of the Military Order of Christ (14 May 1991)
- South Africa:
  - Grand Cross of the Order of Good Hope (1999)
- Spain:
  - Knight Grand Cross of the Order of Charles III (7 October 1985)
  - Knight Grand Cross of the Order of Isabella the Catholic
- Sweden:
  - Commander Grand Cross of the Royal Order of the Polar Star (1976)
- Tunisia:
  - Grand Cordon of the National Order of Merit of Tunisia (1973)
- United Kingdom:
  - Honorary Knight Grand Cross of the Royal Victorian Order (18 November 1982)

==== Academic awards ====
- Honorary Doctor of the International Institute of Social Studies (1988)

Prince Claus was also appointed Honorary Fellow of the International Institute of Social Studies (ISS) in 1988. Prince Claus was a prominent member of the international development cooperation community.

== Ancestry ==
Ancestors of Prince Claus of the Netherlands

8. Gabriel von Amsberg
4. Wilhelm von Amsberg
9. Marie von Passow
2. Claus Felix von Amsberg
10. Leopold von Vieregge
5. Elise von Vieregge
11. Baroness Agnes von Gutschmid
1. Prince Claus of the Netherlands
12. Baron Julius von dem Bussche-Haddenhausen
6. Baron Georg von dem Bussche-Haddenhausen
13. Juliane Mathilde von Salviati
3. Baroness Gösta von dem Bussche-Haddenhausen
14. Baron Eberhard von dem Bussche-Ippenburg
7. Baroness Gabriele Marie von dem Bussche-Ippenburg
15. Barbara Warinka von Chelius

== Issue ==
Name	Birth	Death	Marriage		Children
Name	Birth	Death	Date	Spouse	Children
King Willem-Alexander	27 April 1967		2 February 2002	Máxima Zorreguieta Cerruti	Catharina-Amalia, Princess of Orange; Princess Alexia; Princess Ariane
Prince Friso	25 September 1968	12 August 2013	24 April 2004	Mabel Wisse Smit	Countess Luana; Countess Zaria
Prince Constantijn	11 October 1969		17 May 2001	Laurentien Brinkhorst	Countess Eloise of Orange-Nassau; Count Claus-Casimir of Orange-Nassau; Countess Leonore of Orange-Nassau

Prince Claus of the Netherlands House of Amsberg Born: 6 September 1926 Died: 6 October 2002
Dutch royalty
Preceded by Prince Bernhard of Lippe-Biesterfeld	Prince consort of the Netherlands; 1980–2002	Vacant until 2013 Title next held by Máxima Zorreguieta Cerruti as Queen consort
