= Damnatz =

- Municipality
- Location of Damnatz within Lüchow-Dannenberg district
- Interactive map of Damnatz
- Location within Germany Location within Lower Saxony
- Coordinates: 53°08′N 11°11′E
- Country: Germany
- State: Lower Saxony
- District: Lüchow-Dannenberg
- Municipal assoc.: Elbtalaue
- Subdivisions: 5 Ortsteile

Government
  - Mayor: Torsten Schulz

Area
  - Total: 16.25 km^{2} (6.27 sq mi)
- Elevation: 14 m (46 ft)

Population (2025-12-31)
  - Total: 299
  - Density: 18.4/km^{2} (47.7/sq mi)
- Time zone: UTC+01:00 (CET)
  - Summer (DST): UTC+02:00 (CEST)
- Postal codes: 29472
- Dialling codes: 05865
- Vehicle registration: DAN

Damnatz is a municipality in the district Lüchow-Dannenberg, in Lower Saxony, Germany.

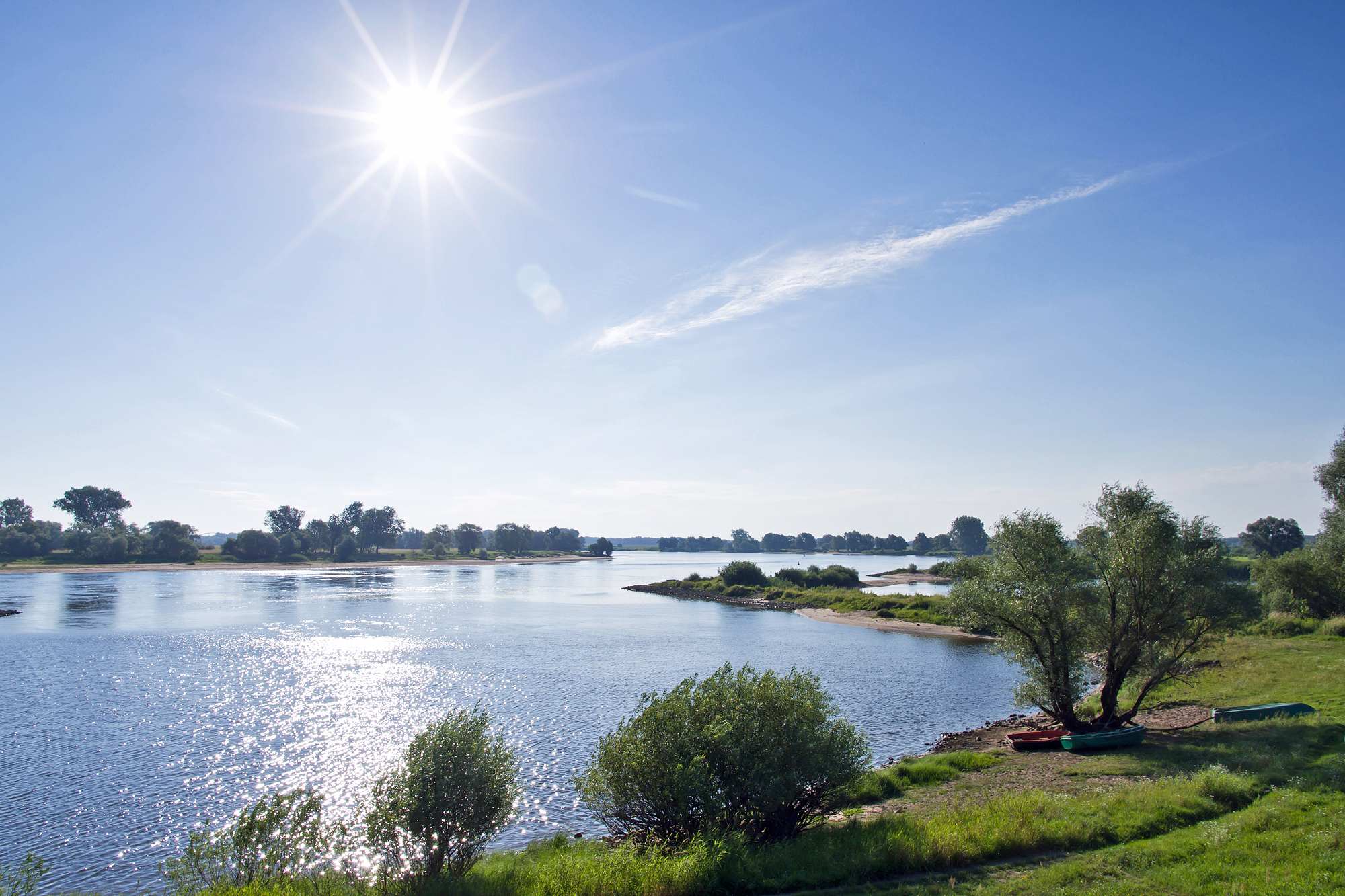
River Elbe in Damnatz

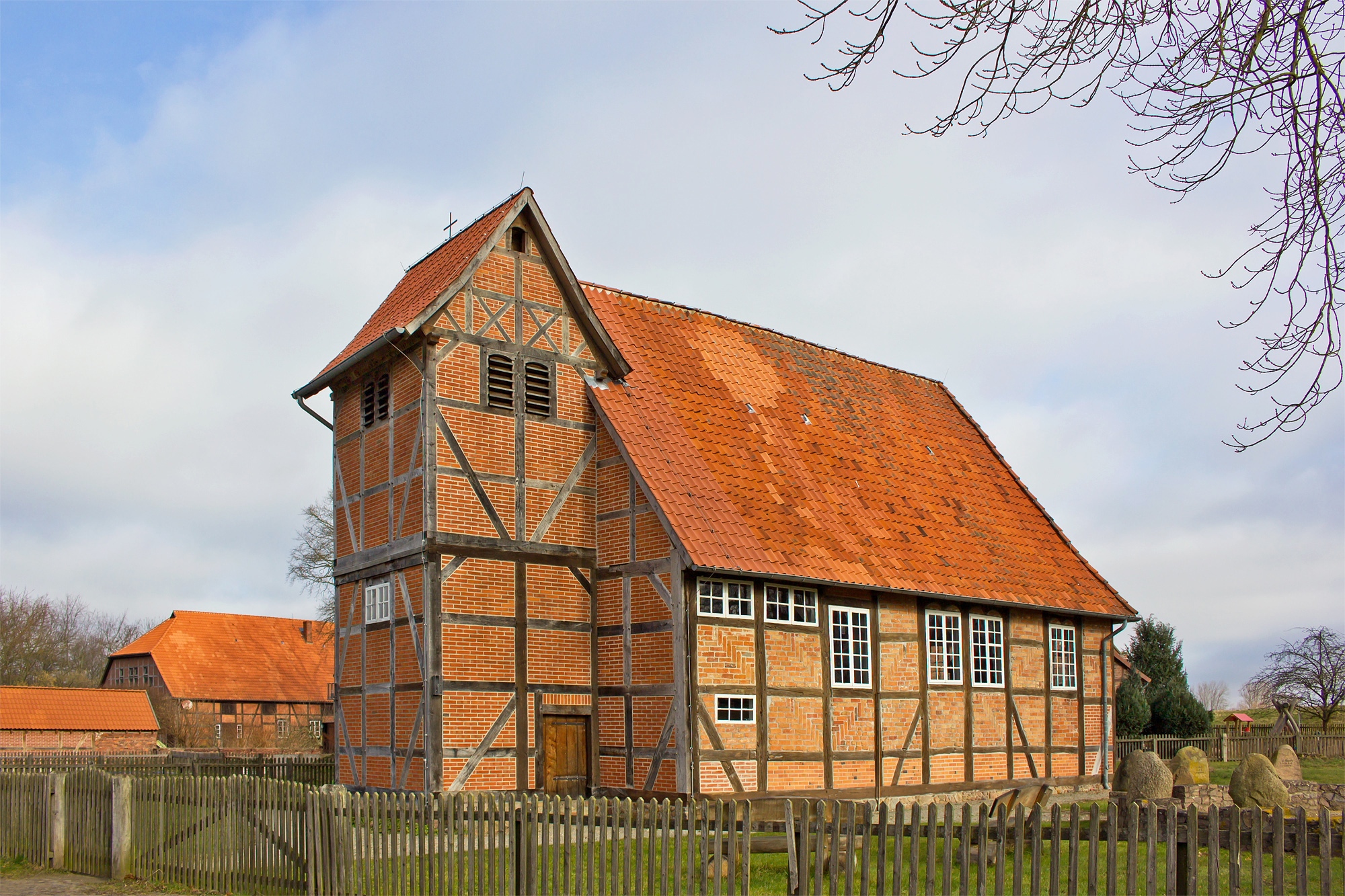
Timber-framed church of Damnatz

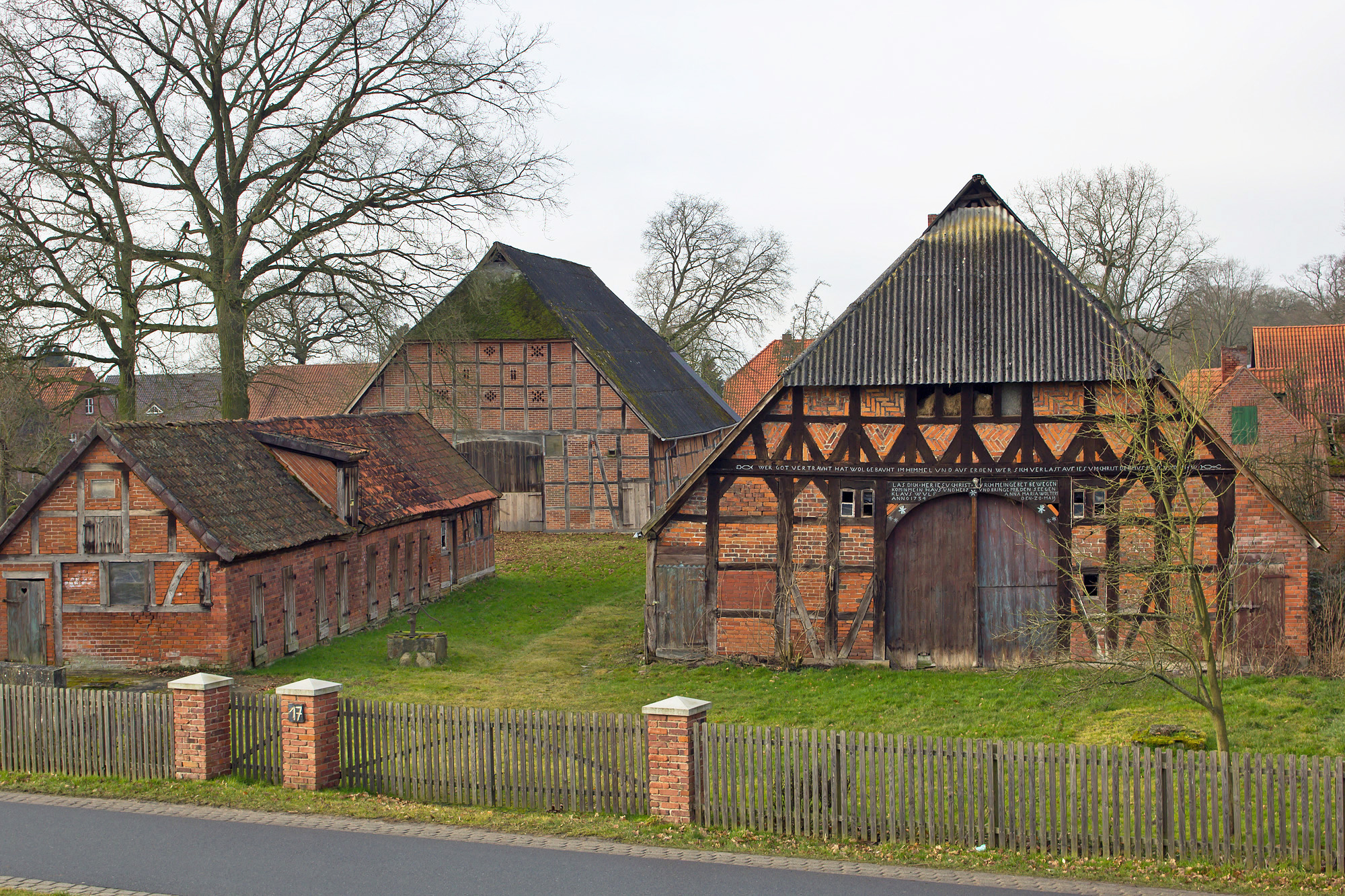
Old farm (18th century)
