= Baroness Gösta von dem Bussche-Haddenhausen =

German baroness and mother of Claus von Amsberg

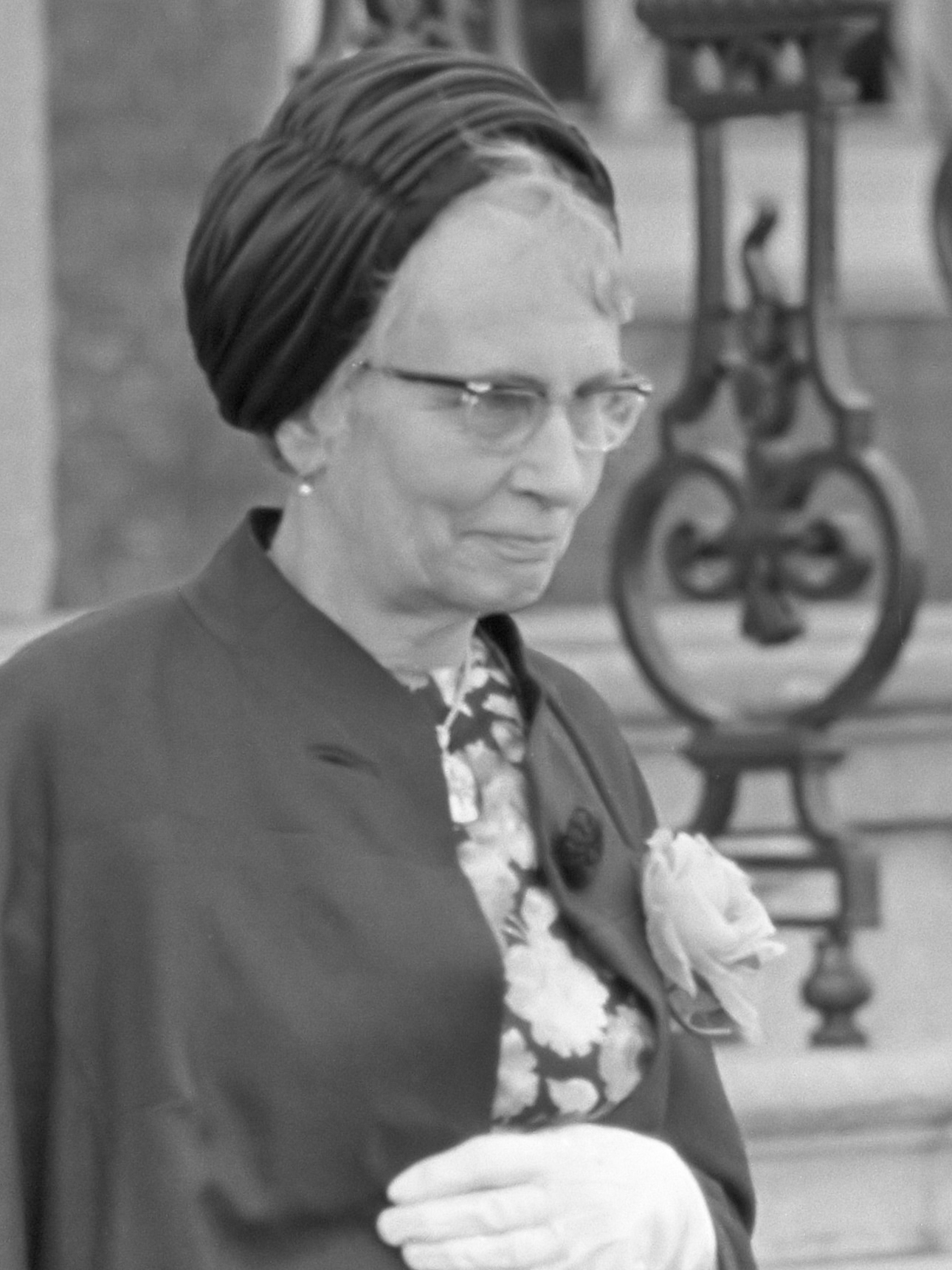
- Full name: German: Gosta Julie Adelheid Marion Marie
- Born: 26 January 1902; Döbeln, Kingdom of Saxony, German Empire
- Died: 13 June 1996 (aged 94); Hitzacker, Lüchow-Dannenberg, Lower Saxony, Germany
- Family: Bussche-Haddenhausen
- Spouse: Claus Felix von Amsberg (m. 1924; died 1953)
- Issue: Sigrid von Amsberg; Prince Claus of the Netherlands; Rixa von Amsberg; Margit von Amsberg; Barbara von Amsberg; Theda von Amsberg; Christina von Amsberg
- Father: Baron George von dem Bussche-Haddenhausen
- Mother: Baroness Gabriele von dem Bussche-Ippenburg

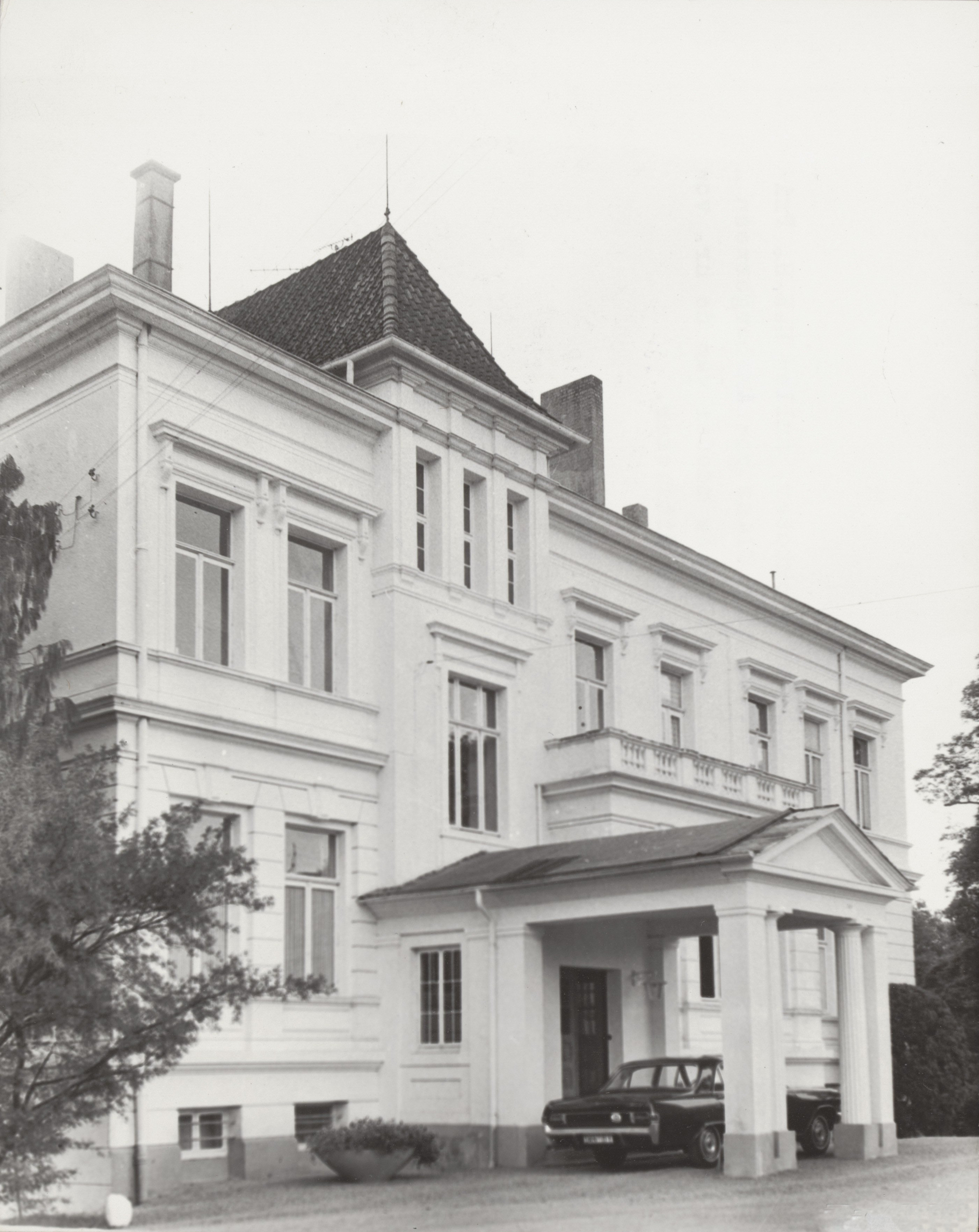
Dötzingen manor house

Baroness Gösta von dem Bussche-Haddenhausen (German: Freiin Gösta Julie Adelheid Marion Marie von dem Bussche-Haddenhausen; 26 January 1902 – 13 June 1996) was a German noblewoman and the mother of Prince Claus of the Netherlands.

== Life in Germany ==
Gösta was born at Döbeln, Kingdom of Saxony, German Empire (now Saxony, Germany), the second child and daughter of Baron George von dem Bussche-Haddenhausen, and his wife, Baroness Gabriele von dem Bussche-Ippenburg. Her father belonged to the Bussche-Haddenhausen branch of the Bussche family, and her mother belonged to the Bussche-Ippenburg branch. Both of Gösta's parents were descended from Clamor von dem Bussche (1532–1573).

Gösta's mother was the heir of Dötzingen Estate near Hitzacker, which her maternal grandfather had inherited from the Counts von Oeynhausen after 1918. Gösta's father was an officer in the Royal Saxon Army. Dötzingen Estate later passed on to Gösta's brother Baron Julius von dem Bussche-Haddenhausen (1906–1977).

After Gösta's return from Africa and her husband's death in 1963, she spent the rest of her life in Dötzingen. Gösta died at the age of 94 in Hitzacker, Germany.

== Marriage ==
Gösta married Claus Felix von Amsberg, son of Wilhelm von Amsberg and Elise von Vieregge, on 4 September 1924 at Hitzacker.

Together, Gösta and Claus Felix had six daughters and one son:

- Sigrid von Amsberg (Hitzacker-Dötzingen, 26 June 1925 – 1 April 2018), married in 1952 to Ascan-Bernd Jencquel (17 August 1913 – 4 November 2003), had issue.
- Claus von Amsberg (Hitzacker-Dötzingen, 6 September 1926 – Amsterdam, 6 October 2002), married in 1966 to Beatrix of the Netherlands (b. 31 January 1938), had issue (including Willem-Alexander of the Netherlands).
- Rixa von Amsberg (Hitzacker-Dötzingen, 18 November 1927 – 6 January 2010), married to Peter Georg Ahrens (27 April 1920 – 11 March 2011), no issue.
- Margit von Amsberg (Bumbuli, 16 October 1930 – 1988), married in 1964 to Ernst Grubitz (14 April 1931 – 5 June 2009), had issue.
- Barbara von Amsberg (Bumbuli, 16 October 1930), married in 1963 to Günther Haarhaus (22 October 1921 – 9 February 2007), had issue.
- Theda von Amsberg (Tanga, 30 June 1939 – Steinbach (Taunus), 24 April 2024), married in 1966 to Baron Karl von Friesen (b. 1933), had issue.
- Christina von Amsberg (Salisbury, 20 January 1945), married in 1971 to Baron Hans Hubertus von der Recke (b. 1942), had issue.

== Life in Africa ==
Gösta's husband Claus Felix had returned from the Tanganyika Territory (now Tanzania), a German colony, during World War I to become the manager of Dötzingen Estate in 1917. Shortly after, the estate passed on to the Bussche family. In 1924, Gösta and Claus Felix married, and in 1926, their son Claus was born at Dötzingen.

In 1928, the family moved to Tanganyika, where they remained during the outbreak of World War II. Claus Felix was the manager of a German-British tea and sisal plantation. Claus was sent back to a German boarding school in 1933, but he returned to Africa in 1936. In 1938, Gösta returned to Germany, and Claus was sent to a boarding school in Misdroy before being drafted by the army. Gösta's husband returned to Germany in 1947.

== Family relations ==
Gösta was a second cousin of Dorothea von Salviati (wife of Wilhelm, German Crown Prince's eldest son Prince Wilhelm of Prussia), both being great-granddaughters of Heinrich von Salviati and Caroline Rahlenbeck. Gösta's younger and only brother Julius (1906–1977) was married to Anna-Elisabeth von Pfuel (1909–2005).

Gösta's family's home, Dötzingen Castle in Lower Saxony, had passed to her maternal grandfather, Eberhard Friedrich Gustav von dem Bussche-Ippenburg, from the Counts von Oeynhausen. At a dinner party hosted by a distant cousin, the Count von Oeynhausen-Sierstorpff in Bad Driburg, on New Year's Eve 1962, Gösta's son Claus met then-Princess Beatrix of the Netherlands for the first time.

Beatrix, like Gösta and Claus, was a cousin of the Counts von Oeynhausen: Beatrix's paternal grandmother Armgard von Cramm was a daughter of Baron Aschwin of Sierstorpff-Cramm (1846–1909) and his wife, Baroness Hedwig von Sierstorpff-Driburg (1848–1900). Armgard had first been married to Count Bodo von Oeynhausen before marrying Prince Bernhard of Lippe-Biesterfeld (1872–1934), Beatrix's paternal grandfather.

Additionally, Armgard's elder sister Baroness Hedwig von Sierstorpff-Cramm (1874–1907) was the heir to her mother's family's Driburg Estate. Hedwig also married a Count von Oeynhausen, Wilhelm Karl Ludwig Kuno Graf von Oeynhausen-Sierstorpff (1860–1922), whose descendants still own the Driburg Estate.

== Ancestry ==
Ancestors of Baroness Gösta von dem Bussche-Haddenhausen

16. Baron George von dem Bussche-Haddenhausen
8. Baron Ludwig von dem Bussche-Haddenhausen
17. Baroness Dorothea Friederike of Hammerstein-Equord
4. Baron Julius von dem Bussche-Haddenhausen
18. Ferdinand von Malortie-Bimont
9. Elise von Malortie
19. Countess Juliane of Platen-Hallermund
2. Baron George von dem Bussche-Haddenhausen
20. Carl Benjamin Salviati
10. Heinrich von Salviati
21. Helene Culemann
5. Mathilde von Salviati
22. Wilhelm Rahlenbeck
11. Caroline Rahlenbeck
23. Henriette Spoerel
1. Baroness Gösta von dem Bussche-Haddenhausen
24. Baron Otto Eberhard von dem Bussche-Ippenburg
12. Baron Clamor von dem Bussche-Ippenburg
25. Dorothea Wilhelmine von Meltzing
6. Baron Eberhard von dem Bussche-Ippenburg
26. Johann Conrad Michaelis
13. Amalie Dorothee Michaelis
27. Anna Friederike Georgine Städeler
3. Baroness Gabriele von dem Bussche-Ippenburg
28. Maximilian Joseph von Chelius
14. Franz von Chelius
29. Baroness Anna Maria Waldburga of Sensburg
7. Barbara Warinka von Chelius
30. Friedrich Minet
15. Maria Anna Josephe Eleanore Minet
31. Emma Helena Bolongaro Crevenna

== Notes and sources ==
- Die Ahnen Claus Georg von Amsberg, Limburg a.d. Lahn, 1966, Euler, F. W., Reference: 3
- Ancestor list HRH Claus Prince of The Netherlands, 1999 and 2003, Verheecke, José, Reference: 3
