= Bussche family =

Westphalian German noble family

Coordinates: 52°20′23″N 8°21′41″E

Bussche coat of arms

The von dem Bussche is the name of an old East-East-Westphalian German noble family. The Lords von dem Bussche belonged to the nobility in the County of Ravensberg. Various branches of the family exist today.

== History ==
=== Origin ===
The first official mention of the Bussche line was in 1225 with the Lord Everhardus de Busche. His brother Albert is known from 1230 deeds. The Lords von dem Bussche were originally from the County of Ravensberg on the border area of Ravensberg and the Prince-Bishopric of Osnabrück, where the family moved in the late Middle Ages.

In 1390 the family acquired the estates of Ippenburg and in 1447 of Hünnefeld, both located east of Osnabrück near the town of Bad Essen. In the early 16th century they acquired the nearby estate at Lohe, in the early 17th century Haddenhausen and in 1656 Streithorst in the same region. With the exception of Lohe these are still today owned by the family.

The Lohe branch acquired further property at Thale and Wendhusen Abbey in the Principality of Anhalt-Köthen in the mid 16th century and owned it until expropriation in communist East Germany in 1945.

The Ippenburg branch inherited Schloss Neuenhof in Lüdenscheid from the barons Bottlenberg-Kessel in 1825, with the head of the branch created Count von dem Bussche-Kessel in 1840. The present count lives at Neuenhof, his second son took over Ippenburg.

All other family members bear the title of barons, by royal Prussian acknowledgement of 1846. Another side line of the Ippenburg branch inherited the estates of Benkhausen and Werburg in 1773 and took on the Name Barons von dem Bussche-Münch; these estates were sold in the 20th century, and the line extinguished. A further side line of the Ippenburg branch inherited Dötzingen estate at Hitzacker from the counts von Oeynhausen after 1918; it was inherited by Gabriele von dem Bussche-Ippenburg (1877–1973) who married baron Georg von dem Bussche-Haddenhausen (1869–1923); their daughter was Baroness Gösta von dem Bussche-Haddenhausen, mother of Claus von Amsberg (later Prince Claus of the Netherlands, prince consort of Queen Beatrix), who partly grew up in Dötzingen.

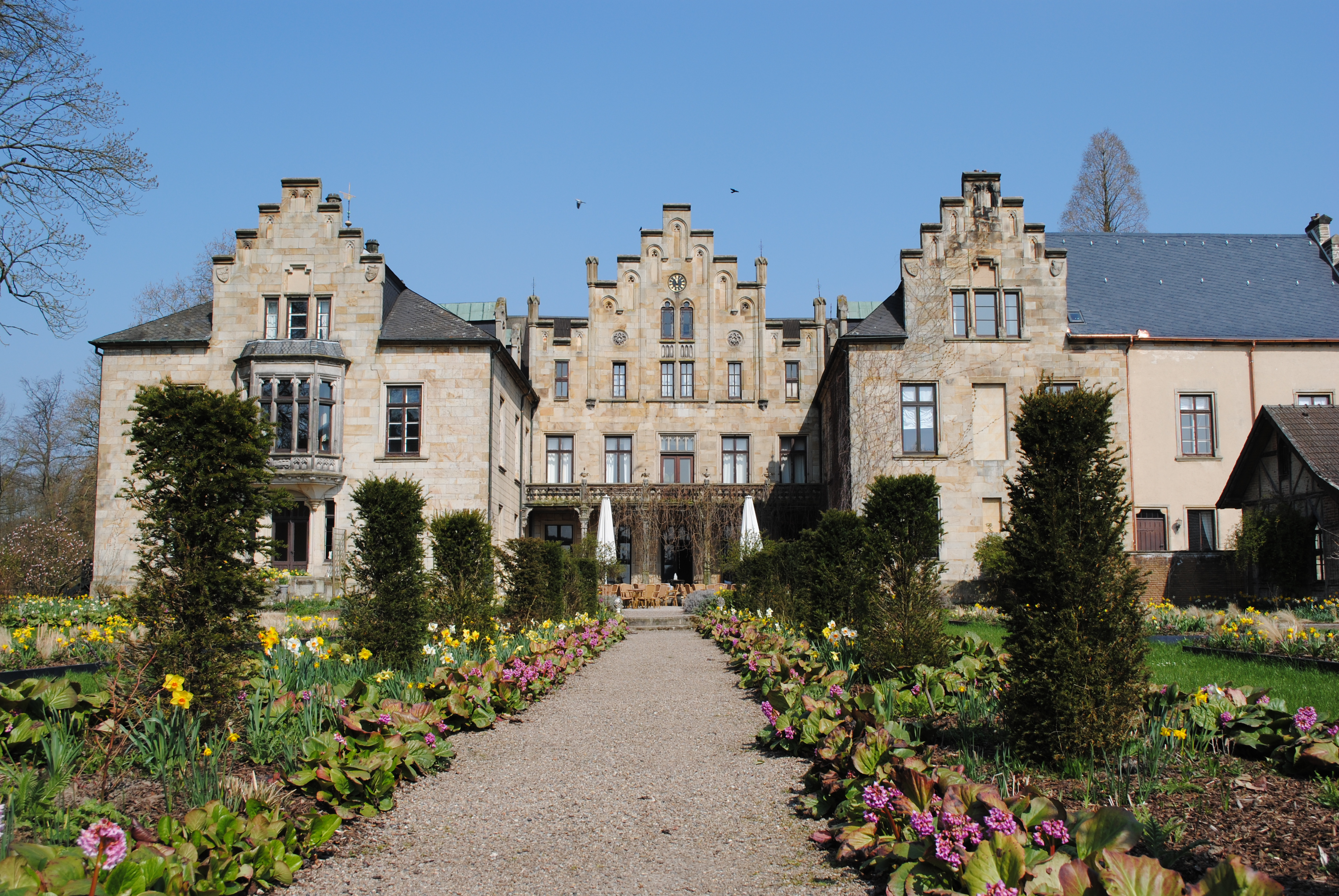
Ippenburg

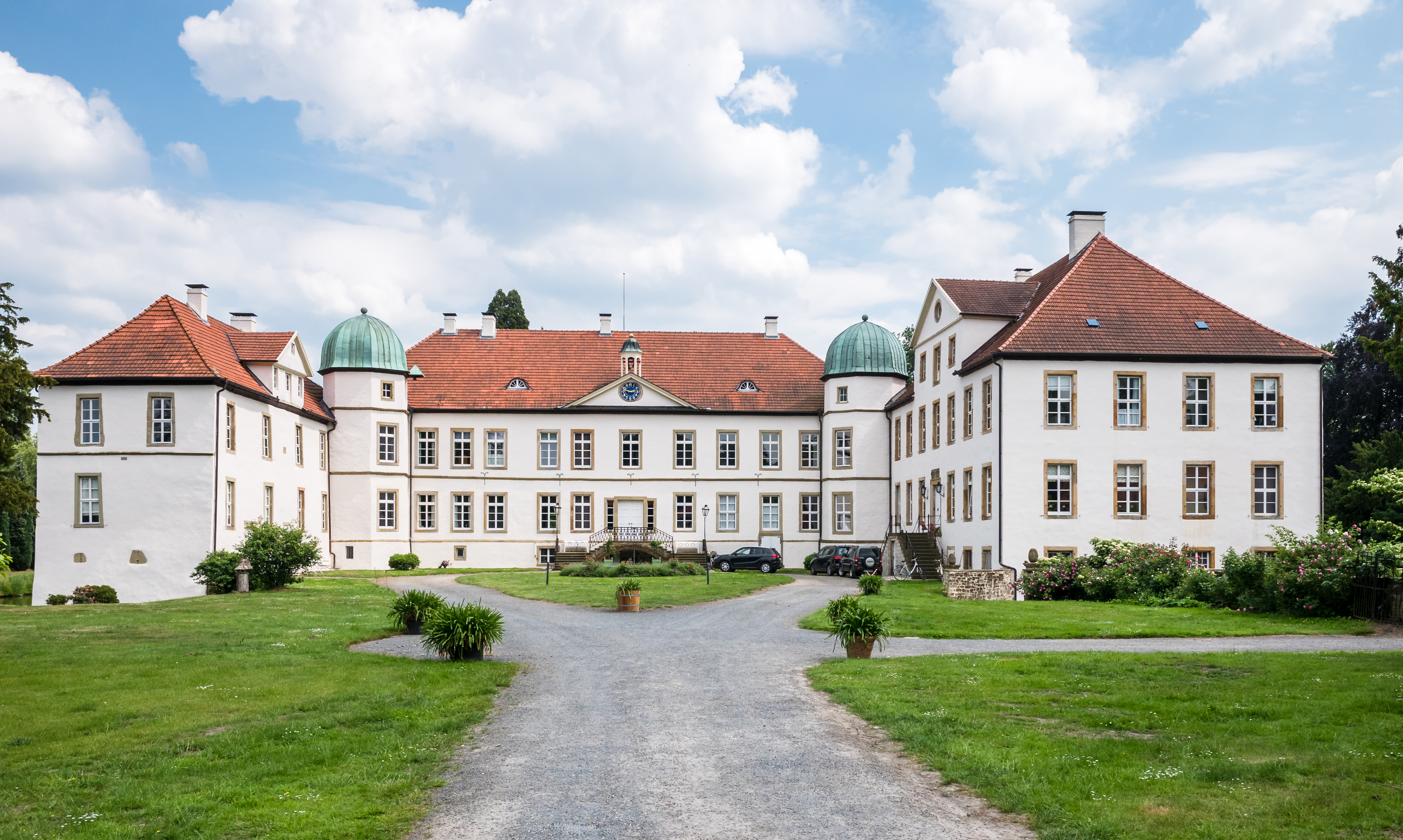
Hünnefeld

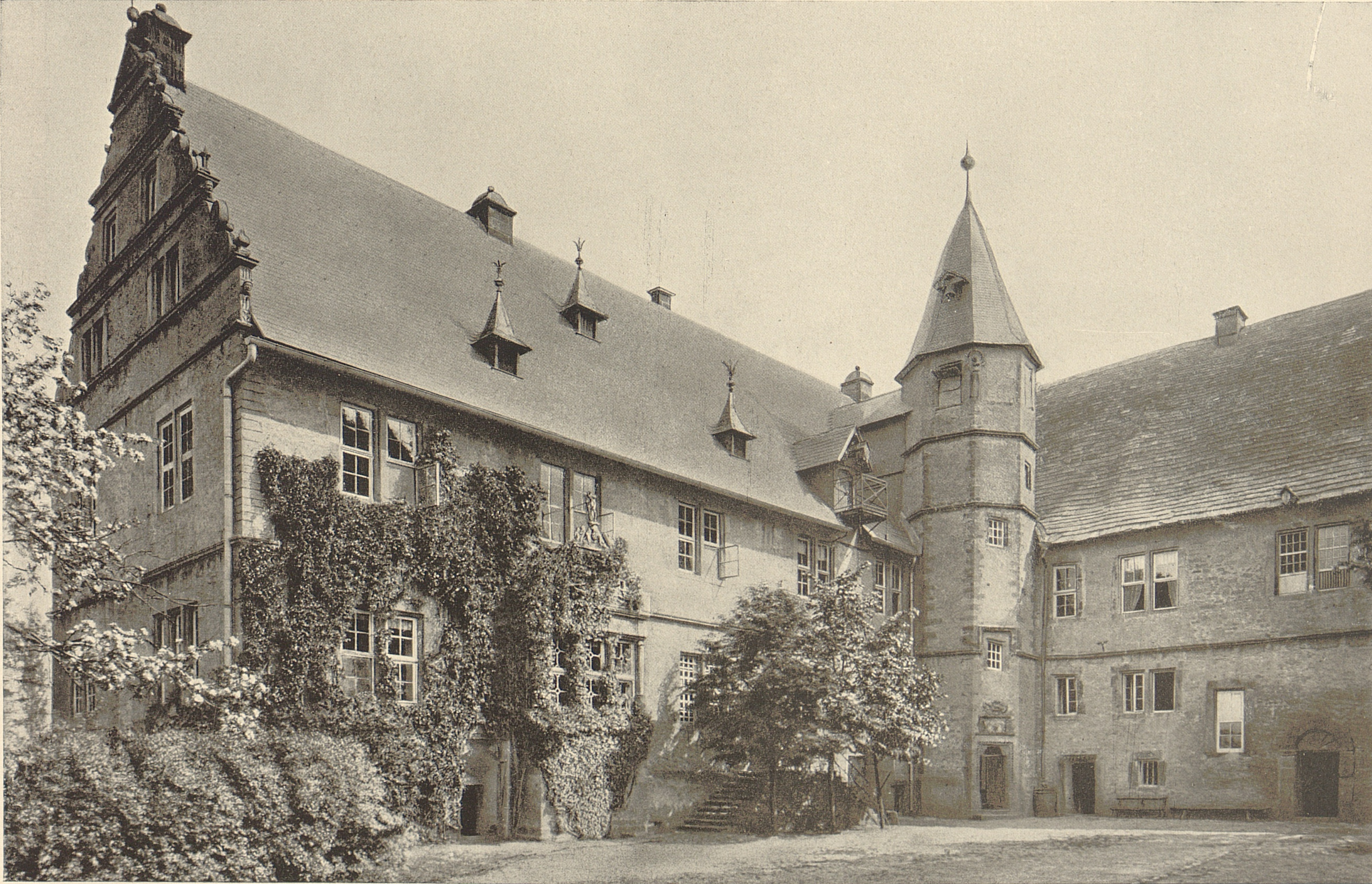
Haddenhausen

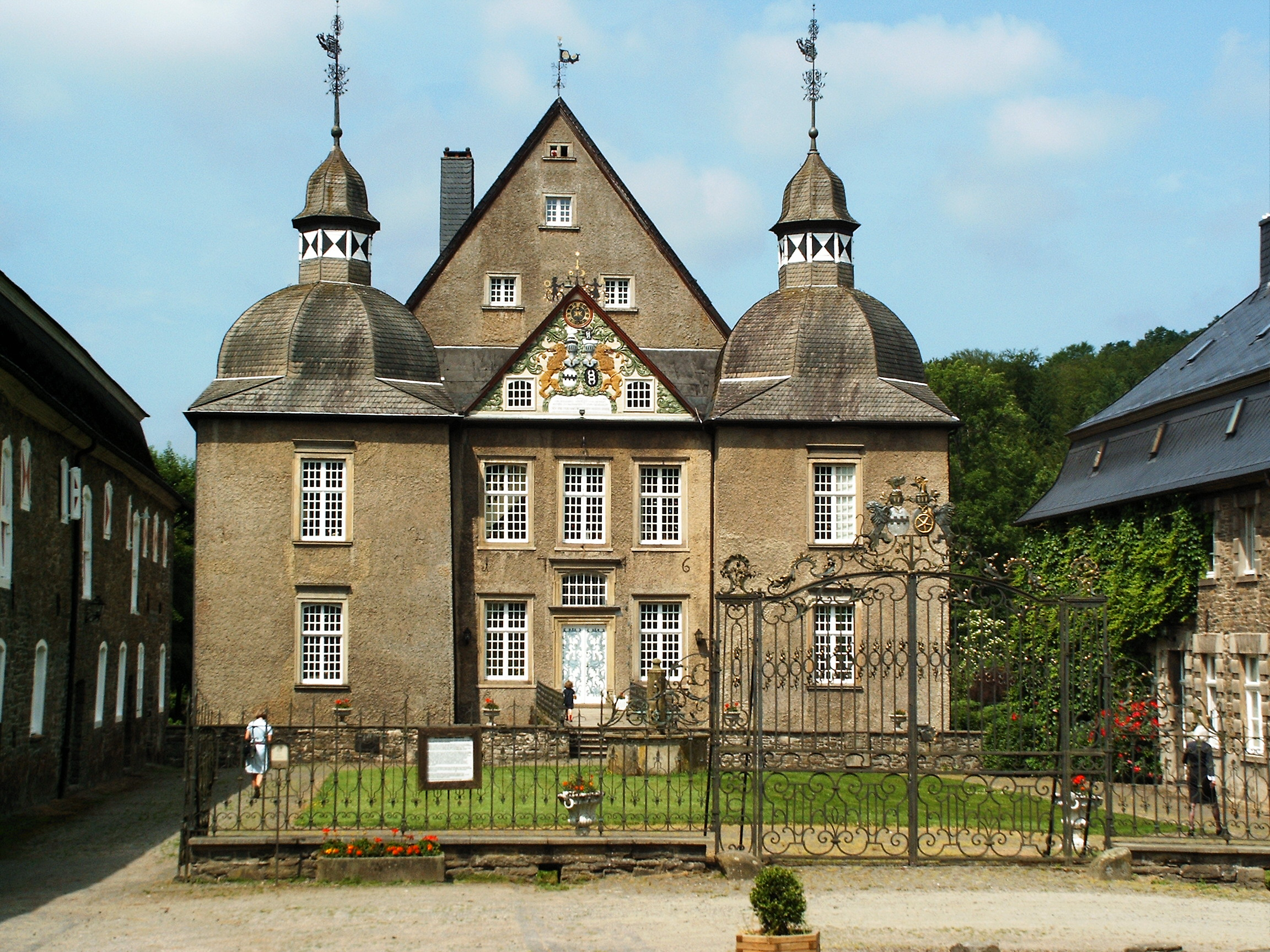
Neuenhof

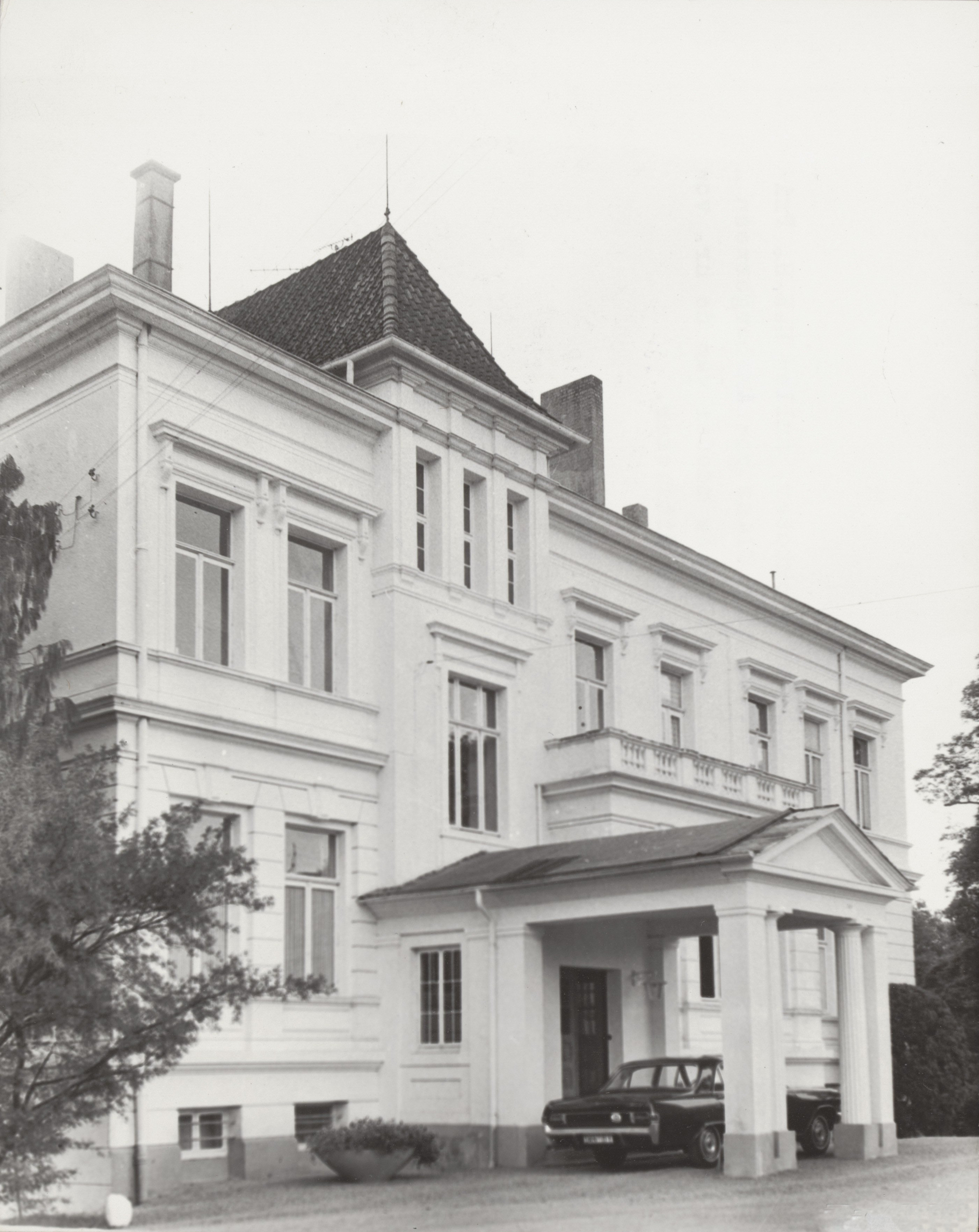
Dötzingen

=== Branches ===
During the 15th and 16th centuries, the family was divided into three branches, named after their ancestral seats, with some of them producing further side branches:

- Bussche-Ippenburg
  - Bussche-Ippenburg genannt von Kessel
  - Bussche-Münch (ext.)
- Bussche-Lohe
  - Bussche-Haddenhausen
- Bussche-Hünnefeld
  - Bussche-Streithorst

== Notable members ==
- Georg Wilhelm von dem Bussche (1726–1794), Hanoverian general
- Baron Hilmar von dem Bussche-Haddenhausen (1867–1939), German diplomat
- Axel Freiherr von dem Bussche-Streithorst (1919–1993), professional Army officer and member of the German resistance.
- Baroness Marie von dem Bussche-Haddenhausen (1900–1974), second wife of Ulrich, 10th Prince Kinsky of Wchinitz and Tettau.
- Baroness Gösta von dem Bussche-Haddenhausen (1902–1996), mother of Prince Claus von Amsberg, consort of Princess Beatrix of the Netherlands
