= Mindmeld =

Mindmeld or Mind meld may refer to:

- Star Trek mind melds, a form of telepathic touch performed by Vulcans
  - "Dagger of the Mind", the Star Trek episode with the first appearance of the Vulcan mind meld
- Mind Meld: Secrets Behind the Voyage of a Lifetime, a 2001 American documentary film
- Mindmelding in philosophy

== See also ==
- Mind (disambiguation)
- Meld (disambiguation)
