= Minding =

Minding may refer to:

- Ferdinand Minding (1806–1885), German mathematician
- Minding (horse), Thoroughbred racehorse

== See also ==
- Mind (disambiguation)
