= MELD =

MELD may refer to:

- Model for End-Stage Liver Disease, a prognostic model
- A variant of the declarative language CycL
- Molecular energy-level diagram, a type of one-dimensional plot with a significant qualitative aspect, used in chemical energetics
- Movement for a Europe of Liberties and Democracy, a former European political party

== See also ==
- Meld (disambiguation)
