= Mined =

Mined may refer to:

- Mined (text editor), a terminal-based text editor
- Mining, the extraction of valuable geological materials from the Earth

== See also ==
- Mind (disambiguation)
- Mine (disambiguation)
