= Melding =

Meld or melding can refer to:

- Meld (cards), displaying a set of cards to other players
- David Melding, a Welsh politician

== See also ==
- Meld (disambiguation)
