= Queen Máxima of the Netherlands =

Queen of the Netherlands since 2013

Máxima
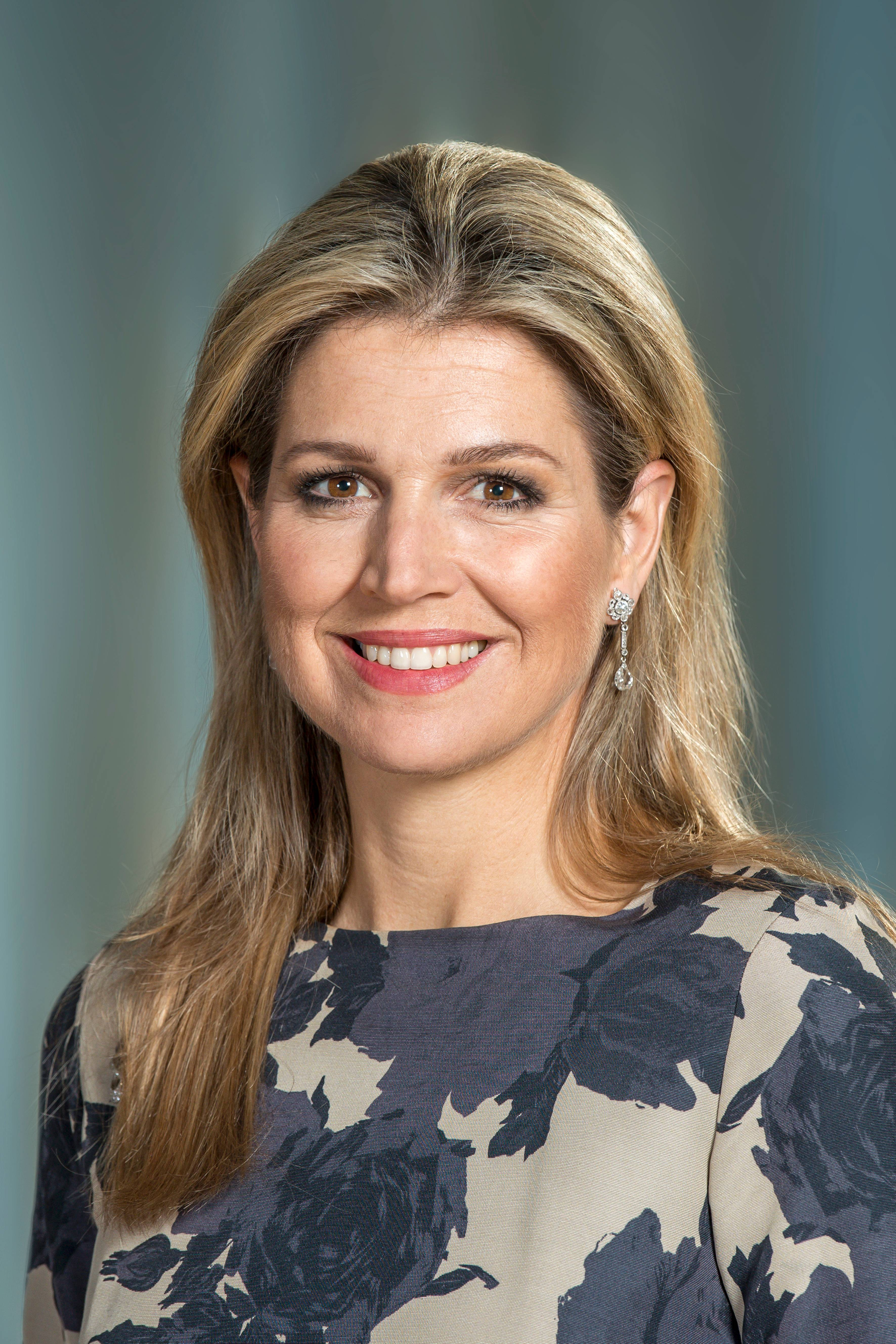
- Formal portrait, 2015

Queen consort of the Netherlands
- Tenure: 30 April 2013 – present
- Born: Máxima Zorreguieta Cerruti; 17 May 1971 (age 55); Buenos Aires, Argentina
- Spouse: Willem-Alexander (m. 2002)
- Issue: Catharina-Amalia, Princess of Orange; Princess Alexia; Princess Ariane
- Father: Jorge Zorreguieta
- Mother: María del Carmen Cerruti
- Religion: Roman Catholicism

Máxima (Note: Dutch pronunciation: [ˈmɑksimaː].) (born Máxima Zorreguieta Cerruti, (Note: Latin American Spanish pronunciation: [ˈmaɣsima soreˈɣjeta].) (Note: In this Spanish name, the first or paternal surname is Zorreguieta and the second or maternal surname is Cerruti) 17 May 1971) is Queen of the Netherlands as the wife of King Willem-Alexander.

Argentine by birth, she worked in finance when she met Willem-Alexander, eldest son and heir apparent of Queen Beatrix, in 1999. They married in 2002, and became king and queen on the abdication of her mother-in-law on 30 April 2013. Máxima has promoted social integration of immigrants, LGBTQ rights, and financial inclusion. She and Willem-Alexander have three daughters, Princesses Catharina-Amalia, Alexia, and Ariane, who are first, second, and third, respectively, in the line of succession.

== Early life and education ==
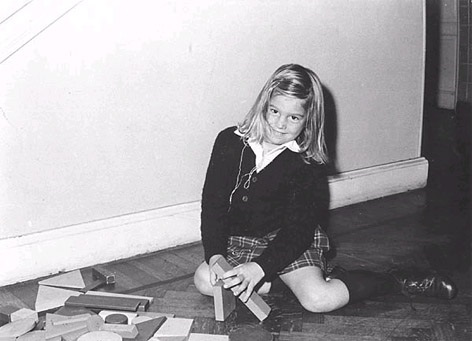
Máxima at age 6 in 1977

Máxima Zorreguieta was born in Buenos Aires, Argentina, on 17 May 1971. She is the daughter of Jorge Zorreguieta (1928–2017), who served as Secretary of Agriculture under Dictator Jorge Rafael Videla during Argentina's last civil-military dictatorship (1976–1983), and his second wife, María del Carmen Cerruti (born 1944). She is named after her paternal great-grandmother Máxima Bonorino González (1874–1965), of Italian and Spanish descent. Originally from the Basque country, her ancestor carrying the Zorreguieta surname, José Antonio Sorreguieta y Oyarzábal Gamboa y Sagastume, migrated to Argentina around the year 1790.

She grew up in the Recoleta neighbourhood of Buenos Aires and studied at Northlands School, a bilingual school of the city of Olivos. She graduated with a degree in economics from the Pontifical Catholic University of Argentina (UCA) in 1995. This private university is governed by a directory of local bishops, which included Pope Francis, then Archbishop of Buenos Aires and Grand Chancellor of UCA. During her student years, Francis presided over the traditional Mass at the beginning of classes. From 1989 to 1990, while still in college, she worked for Mercado Abierto Electrónico S.A. From 1992 to 1995, she worked in the sales department of Boston Securities SA in Buenos Aires, where she conducted research on software for financial markets. From July 1996 to February 1998, she worked for HSBC James Capel Inc. in New York City, where she became vice president of institutional sales for Latin America. From then until July 1999, she was vice president of the emerging markets division of Dresdner Kleinwort Benson in New York. From May 2000 to March 2001, she worked for Deutsche Bank in Brussels.

== Relationship with Willem-Alexander ==
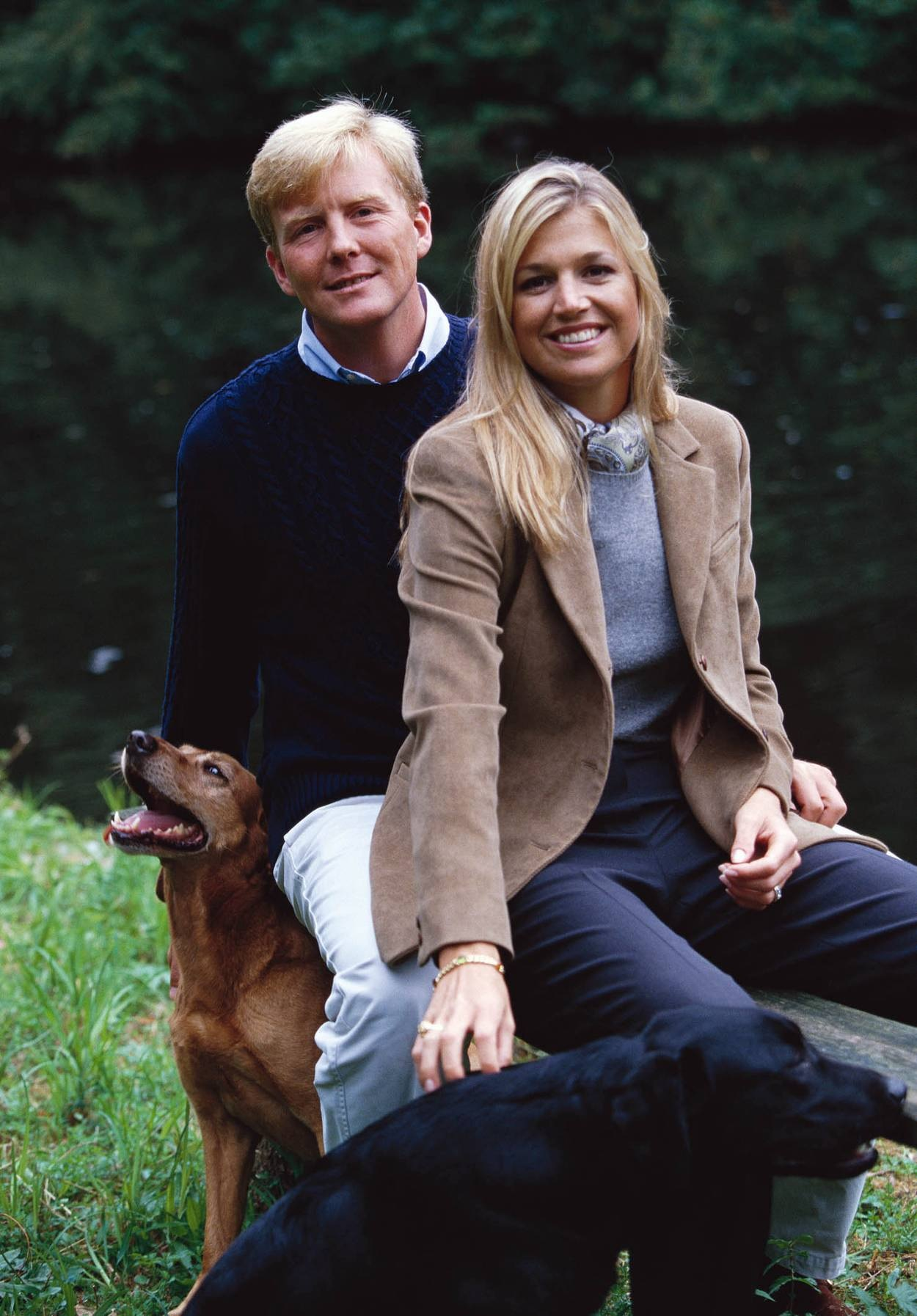
Máxima and Willem-Alexander, 2001

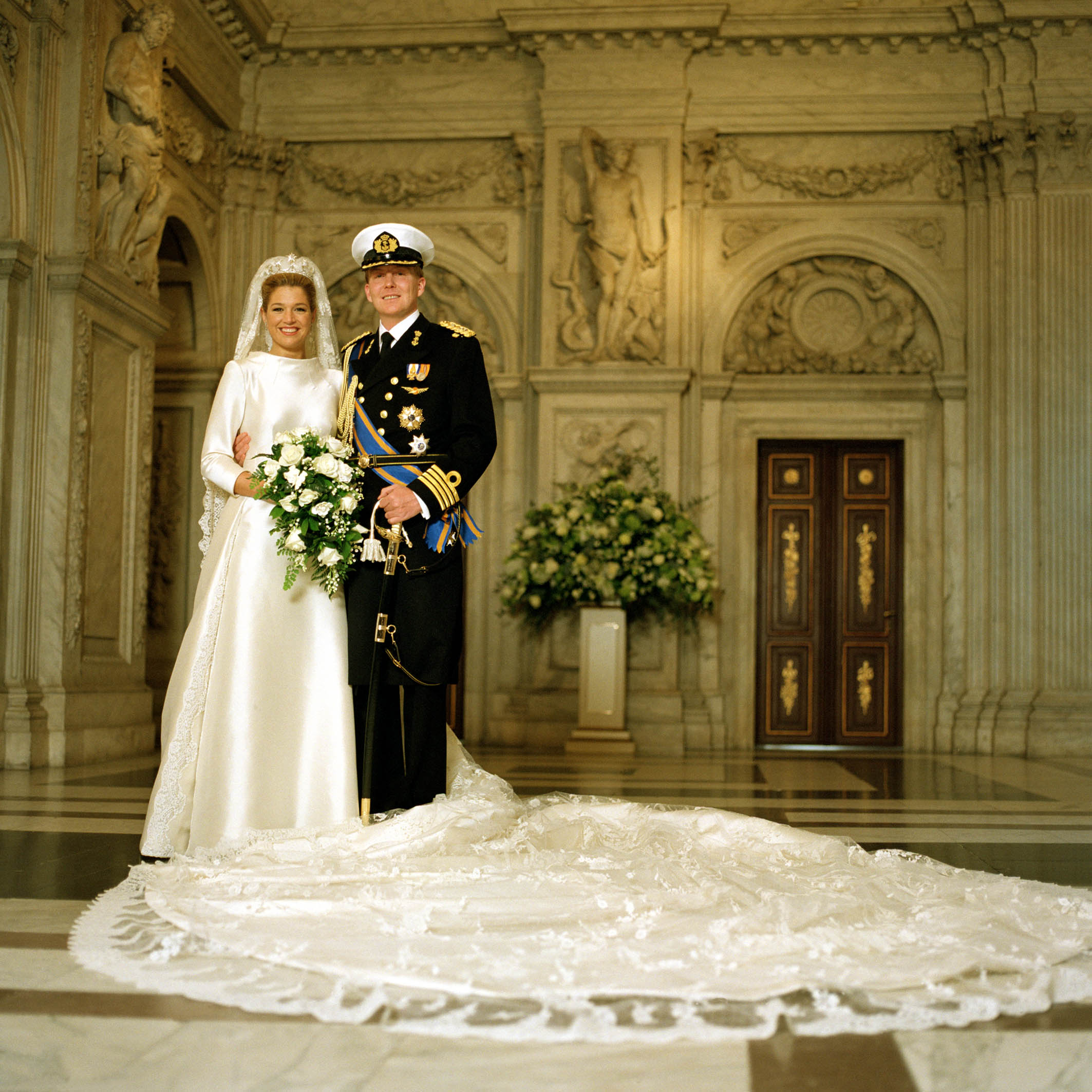
The royal wedding, February 2002

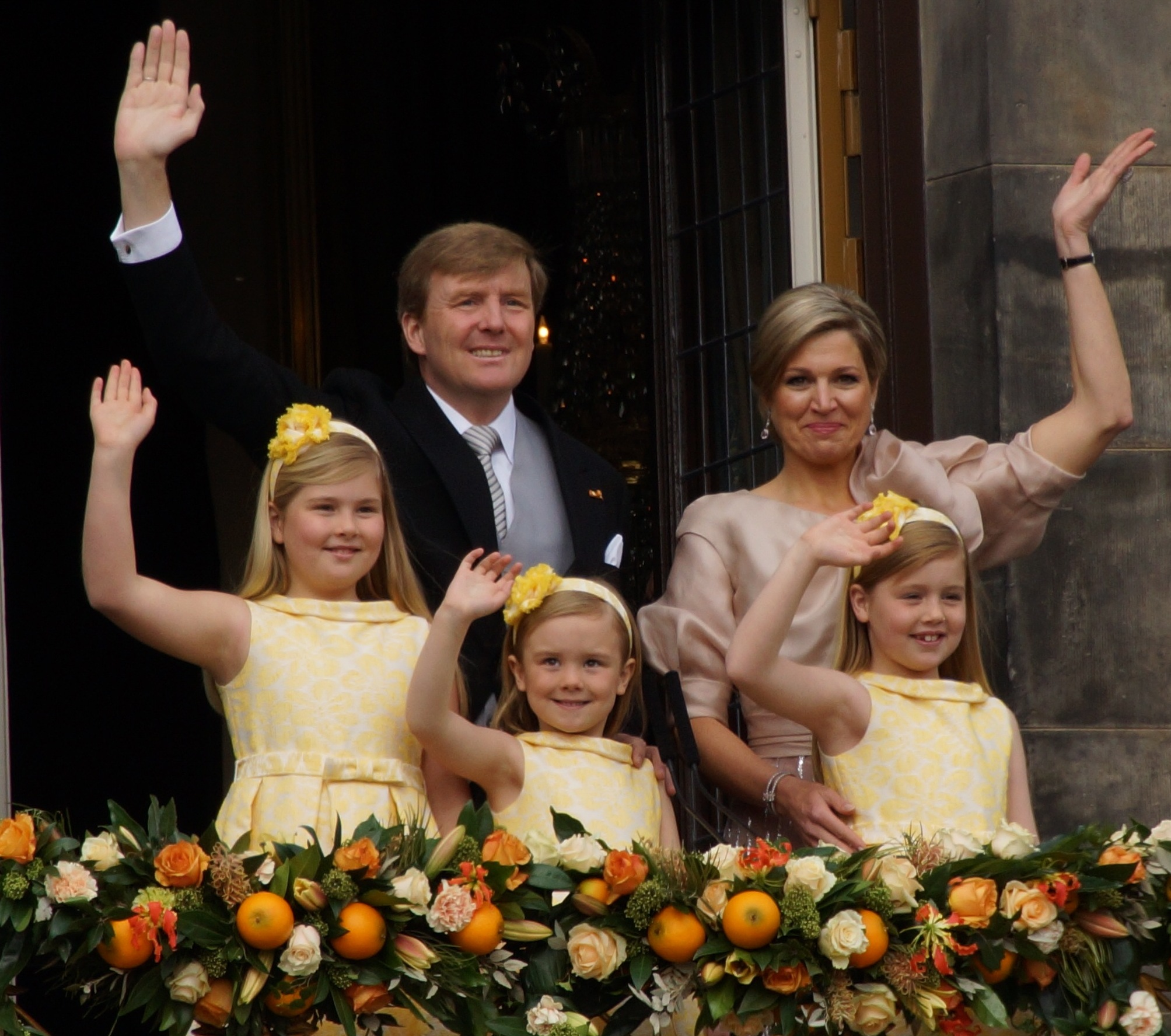
Willem-Alexander, Máxima and their daughters on the balcony of the Royal Palace, after the abdication of Queen Beatrix in 2013

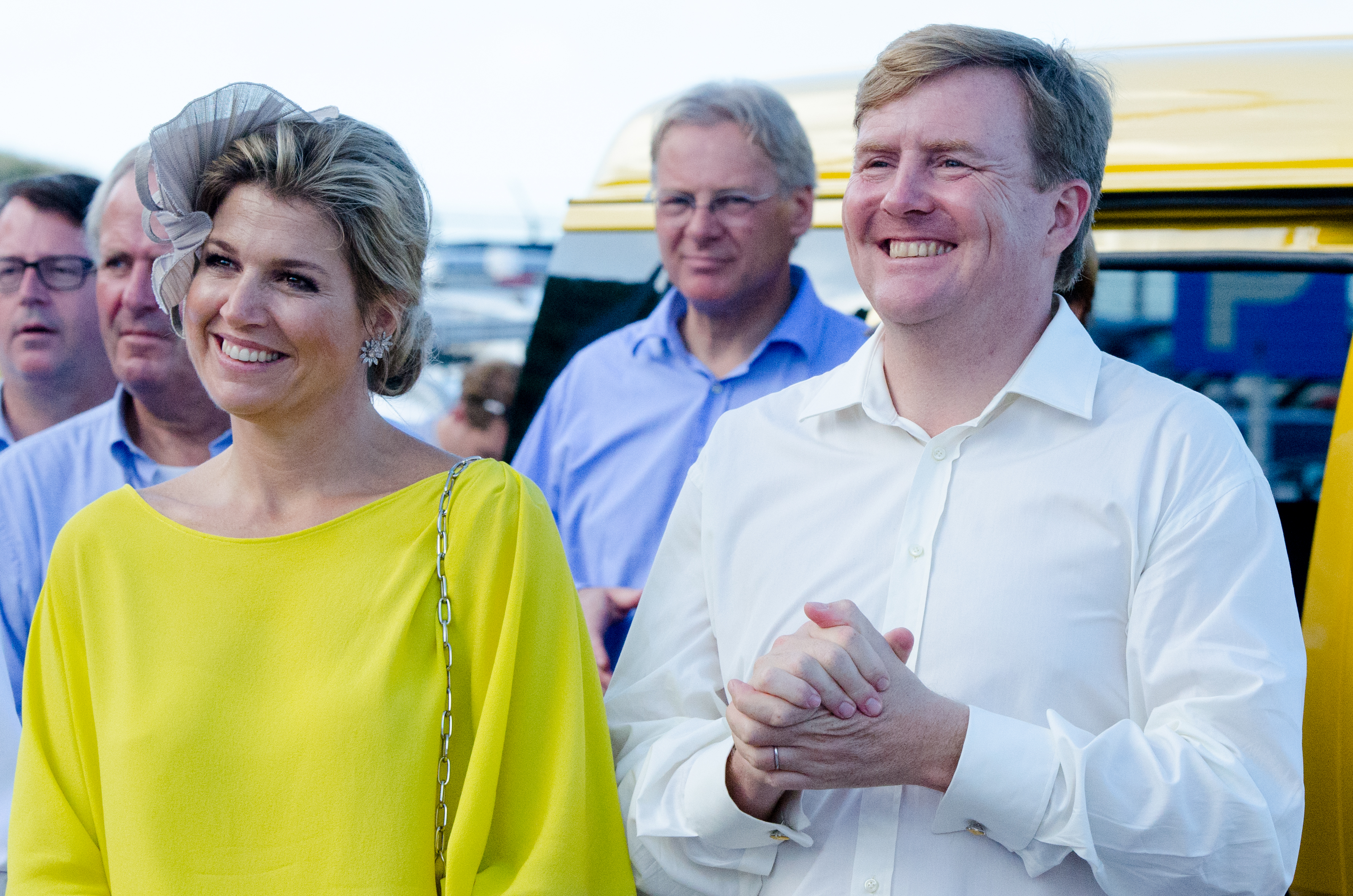
Queen Máxima and King Willem-Alexander in Saba in 2013

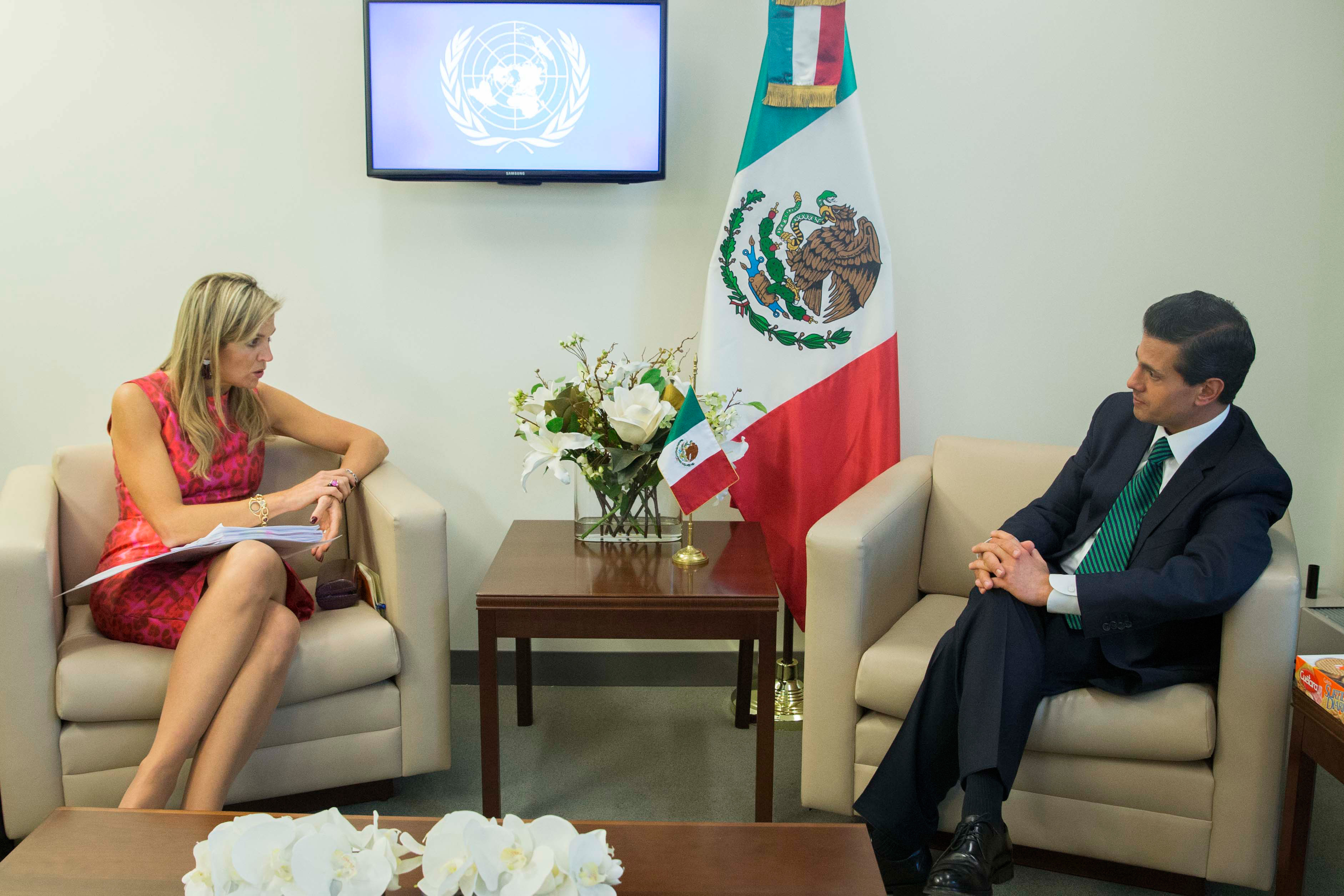
Máxima in 2015 with President Enrique Peña Nieto of Mexico

Máxima met Willem-Alexander in April 1999 in Seville, Spain, during the Seville Spring Fair. In an interview, they stated that he introduced himself only as "Alexander", so that she did not know he was a prince. She thought he was joking when he later told her that he was the Prince of Orange and heir apparent to the Dutch throne. According to the unauthorised biography Máxima. La construcción de una reina, she was invited to Seville by a friend living in New York who openly said she would introduce her to two European princes. They agreed to meet again two weeks later in New York, where Máxima was working for Dresdner Kleinwort Benson. Although they first met in Seville, their relationship apparently began in New York.

The news of the couple's relationship and eventual marriage plans caused controversy in the Netherlands, due to the involvement of Máxima's father Jorge Zorreguieta as a cabinet minister during the National Reorganization Process, the most recent Argentine dictatorship. Her father's 1979–1981 tenure as a minister took place during the later stages of the Dirty War (1974–1982), a period of repression that saw about 30,000 people killed or disappeared during the seven-year military regime. At the request of the States General, Michiel Baud, a Dutch professor in Latin American studies, carried out an inquiry into the involvement of Zorreguieta in the Dirty War. Zorreguieta claimed that, as a civilian, he was unaware of the Dirty War while he was a cabinet minister. Baud determined that Máxima's father had not been directly involved in any of the numerous atrocities that took place during that period. However, Baud also concluded that Zorreguieta was almost certainly aware of them; in Baud's view, it was highly unlikely that a cabinet minister would not have known about them. After becoming queen, Máxima's popularity increased. As of 2024, she is the most popular Dutch royal.

A television series Máxima Zorreguieta: Motherland began airing on Videoland in the Netherlands in 2024. The series is set to focus on her early life in Argentina and meeting King Willem-Alexander.

== Marriage and family ==
The couple announced their engagement on 30 March 2001; Máxima addressed the nation in Dutch (which at the time she only spoke at a basic conversational level) during the live televised broadcast. Máxima was granted Dutch citizenship by a royal decree on 17 May 2001 and now has dual citizenship: Argentine and Dutch. The engagement was formally approved by the States General later that year, a necessary step for Willem-Alexander to remain in line to the throne.

Máxima and Willem-Alexander were married on 2 February 2002 in a civil ceremony in the Beurs van Berlage, Amsterdam, which was then followed by a religious ceremony at Amsterdam's Nieuwe Kerk ("New Church"). Máxima's parents were not present at the wedding; her father was told he could not attend due to his role as a cabinet minister during the National Reorganization Process, and her mother chose not to attend without her husband.

The couple are the parents of three daughters:

- Catharina-Amalia, Princess of Orange (born 7 December 2003)
- Princess Alexia of the Netherlands (born 26 June 2005)
- Princess Ariane of the Netherlands (born 10 April 2007)

== Activities ==
Queen Máxima has a particular concern for the integration of immigrants into Dutch culture. She was a member of a special parliamentary commission that sought to recommend ways to increase the participation of female immigrants in the workforce. Máxima stresses the importance for immigrants of learning the Dutch language (as she did) in order to fully participate in Dutch society. Dutch is the Queen's third language; she is also fluent in Spanish (her native language) and English. She speaks French at a conversational level.

In 2007, Máxima inadvertently caused a wave of massive criticism when in a speech to the Scientific Council for Government Policy she said that in the seven years that she had been in the Netherlands, she had been unable to find the Dutch identity. Maxima is quoted as having said the following:

... but 'the' Dutch identity? No, I have not found it. The Netherlands is: large windows without curtains so everyone can look in; but also adherence to privacy and coziness. The Netherlands is: one biscuit at tea; but also great hospitality and warmth. The Netherlands is: sobriety, control and pragmatism; but also the experience of intense emotions together. The Netherlands is far too diverse to summarize in one cliché. 'The' Dutchman does not exist. As a consolation I can tell you that 'the' Argentine also does not exist. I therefore find it very interesting that the title of the report of the Scientific Council for Government Policy is not 'the Dutch identity'. But: Identification with the Netherlands. That leaves room for development and diversity. (Note: Translated from the Dutch original.)

She participates in conferences around the world representing the Netherlands. She was granted a seat in the Dutch Council of State on 20 October 2004, the highest advisory body and court of administration. She was a member of the Committee for Ethnic Minority Women's Participation from July 2003 until 2005. She has a seat on the board of governors of the chair on the Management of Diversity and Integration at the Vrije Universiteit Amsterdam; she (along with her husband) is a patron of the Orange Fund (established to promote social welfare and cohesion in the Netherlands); and she also chairs the Board of Trustees of the Prince Claus Chair in Development and Equity of the International Institute of Social Studies and the University of Utrecht.

Máxima attended a conference concerned with LGBT rights on 5 March 2008.

Queen Máxima has been honorary chair of the Money Wise Platform since 2010. In this capacity, the Queen focuses attention on the importance of financial education and managing money sensibly, especially where children and young people are concerned. The Queen acts as special advisor to the Platform and consults with interested parties on ways of increasing people's financial awareness and resilience.

Since 10 June 2015, Queen Máxima has been the honorary chair of the Ambassadors for Music at School Platform. Queen Máxima has for some years been committed to giving as many children as possible the opportunity to create music.

Queen Máxima is a member of the Committee for Enterprise and Finance, which succeeded the Microfinance Council in 2011. The Queen is committed to extending the reach of various financing opportunities, both through coaching and by providing credit for new and existing small businesses in the Netherlands. She also works to increase the number of women entrepreneurs and the scope they have to expand their businesses.

External videos
- Máxima launches MIND Us: "My quest after the death of my sister Inés"

Since March 2022 Queen Máxima is an Honorary President of "MIND Us" – a mental health platform created in collaboration with the MIND Foundation.

In February 2026, it was reported that Máxima had enlisted in the Dutch National Reserve Corps. After completing her training, she was sworn in as a reservist in a ceremony in November 2026.

=== UNSGSA ===
Queen Máxima serves as the United Nations Secretary-General's Special Advocate for Inclusive Finance for Development (UNSGSA). In September 2009 then UN Secretary-General Ban Ki-moon designated her to this role in order to raise awareness on the importance of inclusive financial systems for achieving economic and development goals such as poverty alleviation, food security and education. In her work as UNSGSA, the Queen focuses on how formal financial services such as savings, insurance, and credit can prevent people from falling into poverty due to expenditures on healthcare, and people who are not able to protect themselves against rising food prices and poverty because they do not have access to basic savings accounts. The role of the UNSGSA is to foster action by governments, private sector, financial system standard setters, and others towards a more inclusive financial system that works for the poor. In later years, her focus as a special advocate expanded to advocating digital financial inclusion, financial health, responsible technology for financial inclusion to support Sustainable Development Goals and agricultural finance. Máxima is also an advocate for increasing access to financial services, improving consumer protection and enhancing financial literacy. According to the UNSGSA website, she "aims to unlock development opportunities and economic inclusion for all."

Queen Máxima visited several countries on behalf of the United Nations. She also recorded a video for the launch of the Global Findex Database 2021. Queen Máxima is also the honorary patron of the G20 Global Partnership for Financial Inclusion (GPFI) since June 2011. In this role she works with governments and partners to advance the G20 Action Plan on Financial Inclusion, and the G20 Financial Inclusion Peer Learning Program. Previously, the Queen was a member of the Advisors Group for the United Nations' International Year of Microcredit 2005 and until 2009, was a member of UN Advisors Group on Inclusive Financial Sectors. She also work as the Global Agenda Trustee for the World Economic Forum's Global Challenge Initiative on the Future of the Global Financial System. Máxima convened the CEO Partnership for Economic Inclusion.

=== GFTN ===
Queen Máxima was appointed in July 2025 as Chair of the International Advisory Board of Global Finance & Technology Network (GFTN).

== Titles, honours and arms ==
By a decree issued on 25 January 2002, upon the solemnization of marriage, Máxima Zorreguieta was granted the titles Princess of the Netherlands and Princess of Orange-Nassau, and the style Royal Highness was formally conferred upon her. She also became "mevrouw van Amsberg" (Mrs. van Amsberg).

Another decree issued on the same day also granted her own personal coat of arms and a personal standard.

On 13 May 2011, the Dutch parliament confirmed that Máxima would become queen consort of the Netherlands upon her husband's accession, after a debate over her future title and style. On 28 January 2013, it was announced that Queen Beatrix would abdicate on 30 April in favour of Willem-Alexander. Máxima is the kingdom's first queen consort since Princess Emma of Waldeck and Pyrmont, the second wife of William III. She is the first Dutch queen to have been born as a commoner, and the first to have been born outside Europe.

=== Royal titles and styles ===
- 2 February 2002 – 30 April 2013: Her Royal Highness Princess Máxima of the Netherlands, Princess of Orange-Nassau, Mrs. van Amsberg
- 30 April 2013 – present: Her Majesty The Queen or Her Majesty Queen Máxima

Máxima's full title is: Her Majesty Queen Máxima, Princess of the Netherlands, Princess of Orange-Nassau.

=== Honours ===
Royal standard of Queen Máxima

==== National ====
- Netherlands:
  - Knight Grand Cross of the Order of the Netherlands Lion (2 February 2002)
  - Recipient of the Wedding Medal of Prince Willem-Alexander, Prince of Orange and Máxima Zorreguieta
  - King Willem-Alexander Investiture Medal (30 April 2013)
  - Grand Cross of the Order of the House of Orange (6 May 2021)

==== Foreign ====
- Austria: Grand Star of the Order of Honour for Services to the Republic of Austria
- Belgium:
  - Grand Cordon of the Order of Leopold I
  - Grand Cross of the Order of the Crown
- Brazil: Grand Cross of the Order of the Southern Cross
- Brunei: Member 1st Class of the Family Order of Laila Utama (DK I, January 2013)
- Cape Verde: Recipient of the Medal of Merit
- Chile: Grand Cross of the Order of Merit
- Cyprus: Grand Cross of the Order of Makarios III (4 March 2025)
- Czech Republic: Member 1st Class of the Order of the White Lion (4 June 2025)
- Denmark: Knight of the Order of the Elephant (RE)
- Estonia: Member 1st Class of the Order of the Cross of Terra Mariana (5 June 2018)
- Finland: Grand Cross of the Order of the White Rose of Finland (11 December 2025)
- France:
  - Grand Cross of the Order of the Legion of Honour (11 April 2023)
  - Grand Cross of the National Order of Merit (20 January 2014)
- Germany:
  - Grand Cross special class of the Order of Merit of the Federal Republic of Germany (5 July 2021)
  - Grand Cross 1st class of the Order of Merit of the Federal Republic of Germany (8 October 2007)
- Greece: Grand Cross of the Order of the Redeemer (31 October 2022)
- Italy: Knight Grand Cross of the Order of Merit of the Italian Republic
- Japan: Grand Cordon of the Order of the Precious Crown
- Jordan: Grand Cordon with Brilliants of the Supreme Order of the Renaissance (20 March 2018)
- Latvia: Grand Cross of the Order of the Three Stars
- Lithuania: Grand Cross of the Order for Merits to Lithuania
- Luxembourg:
  - Knight of the Order of the Gold Lion of the House of Nassau
  - Grand Cross of the Order of Adolphe of Nassau
- Mexico: Grand Cross of the Mexican Order of the Aztec Eagle
- Norway: Grand Cross of the Order of Saint Olav
- Oman:
  - Member Special Class of the Order of Oman (15 April 2025)
  - Member 1st Class of the Order of Sultan Qaboos (10 January 2012)
- Poland: Knight of the Order of the White Eagle
- Portugal:
  - Grand Collar of the Order of Prince Henry (GColIH)
  - Grand Collar of the Order of Christ (GCol)
- Slovakia: Member 1st Class of the Order of the White Double Cross (7 March 2023)
- South Korea: Grand Gwanghwa Medal of the Order of Diplomatic Service Merit (12 December 2023)
- Spain:
  - Dame Grand Cross of the Order of Charles III (26 March 2024)
  - Dame Grand Cross of the Royal Order of Isabella the Catholic (GYC, 19 October 2001)
- Suriname: Grand Cordon of the Order of the Yellow Star (1 December 2025)
- Sweden:
  - Member of the Royal Order of the Seraphim (LSerafO, 11 October 2022)
  - Commander Grand Cross of the Royal Order of the Polar Star (KmstkNO, 21 April 2009)
- United Arab Emirates: Grand Cross of the Order of Union

=== Arms ===
Coat of arms of Queen Máxima of the Netherlands
Notes This coat of arms is used by Queen Máxima of the Netherlands. It was granted by royal decree-law of Queen Beatrix on 25 January 2002. Escutcheon Quarterly: I and IV azure billety or, a lion with coronet also or armed and langued gules, holding in his dexter paw a sword argent hilted or, and in his sinister seven arrows argent pointed and bound together or, which is of the Kingdom of the Netherlands; II and III or, a horn azure opened and bound gules, which is of the First House of Orange; an inescutcheon or bearing a castle of three towers gules flanked on each side by a poplar tree au naturel, and a river azure flowing from the base, ondoyant to the gate of the castle, which is of the house of Zorreguieta in Argentina. Symbolism The first and fourth quarters are the coat of arms of the Netherlands, based on the coat of arms of the House of Nassau. The second and third quarters are the coat of arms of the Prince of Orange. In the center is the coat of arms of Queen Máxima's paternal family, the Zorreguieta family.

== Notes ==
Dutch royalty
Vacant Title last held by Claus von Amsberg as Prince consort	Queen consort of the Netherlands; 2013–present	Incumbent
