= Albert Jansz Vinckenbrinck =

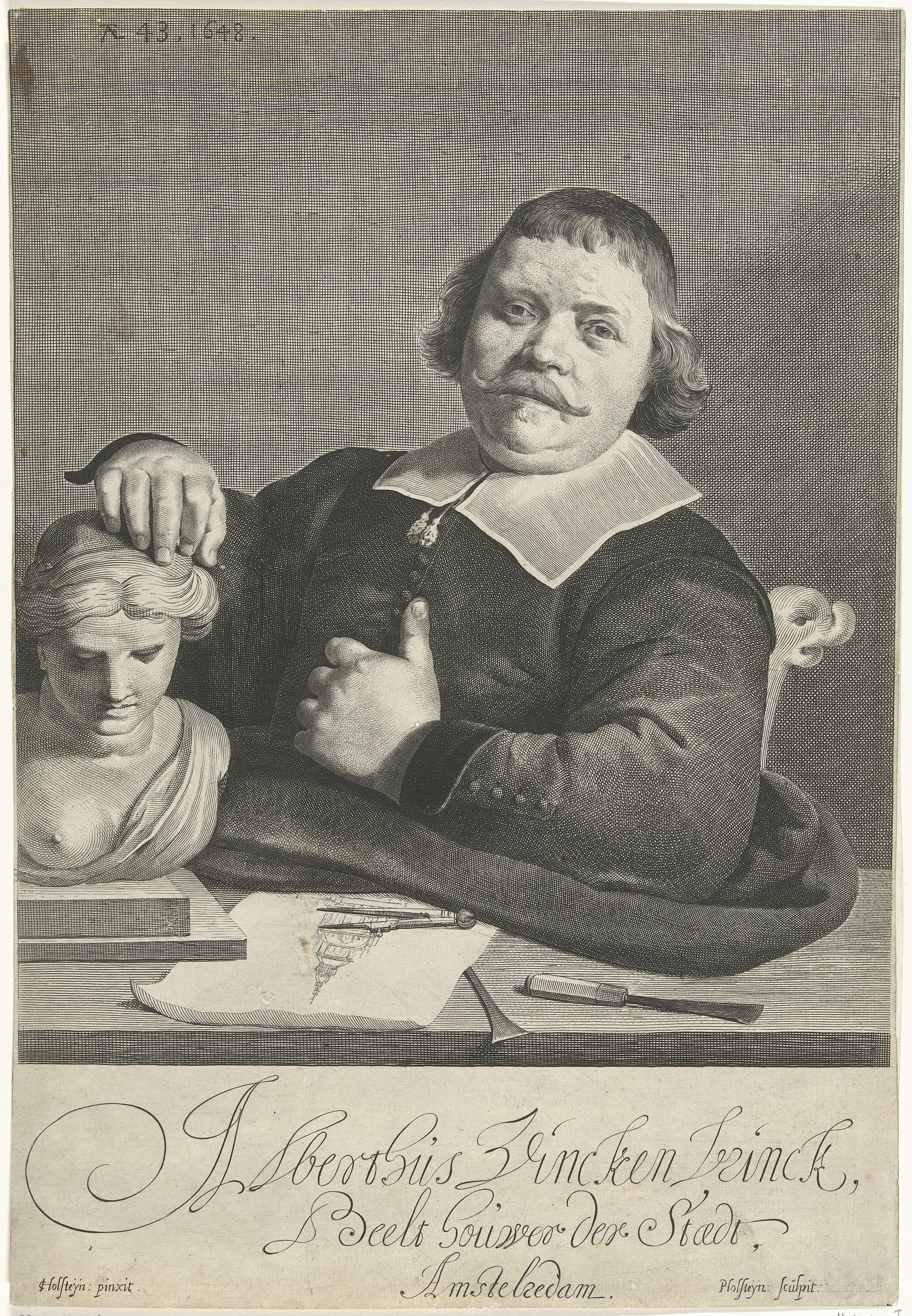
Portrait of the Amsterdam sculptor Albert Jansz. Vinckenbrinck by the brothers Cornelis & Pieter Holsteyn.

Albert Jansz Vinckenbrink (1604 in Spaarndam – 1665 in Amsterdam), was a Dutch Golden Age sculptor in Amsterdam.

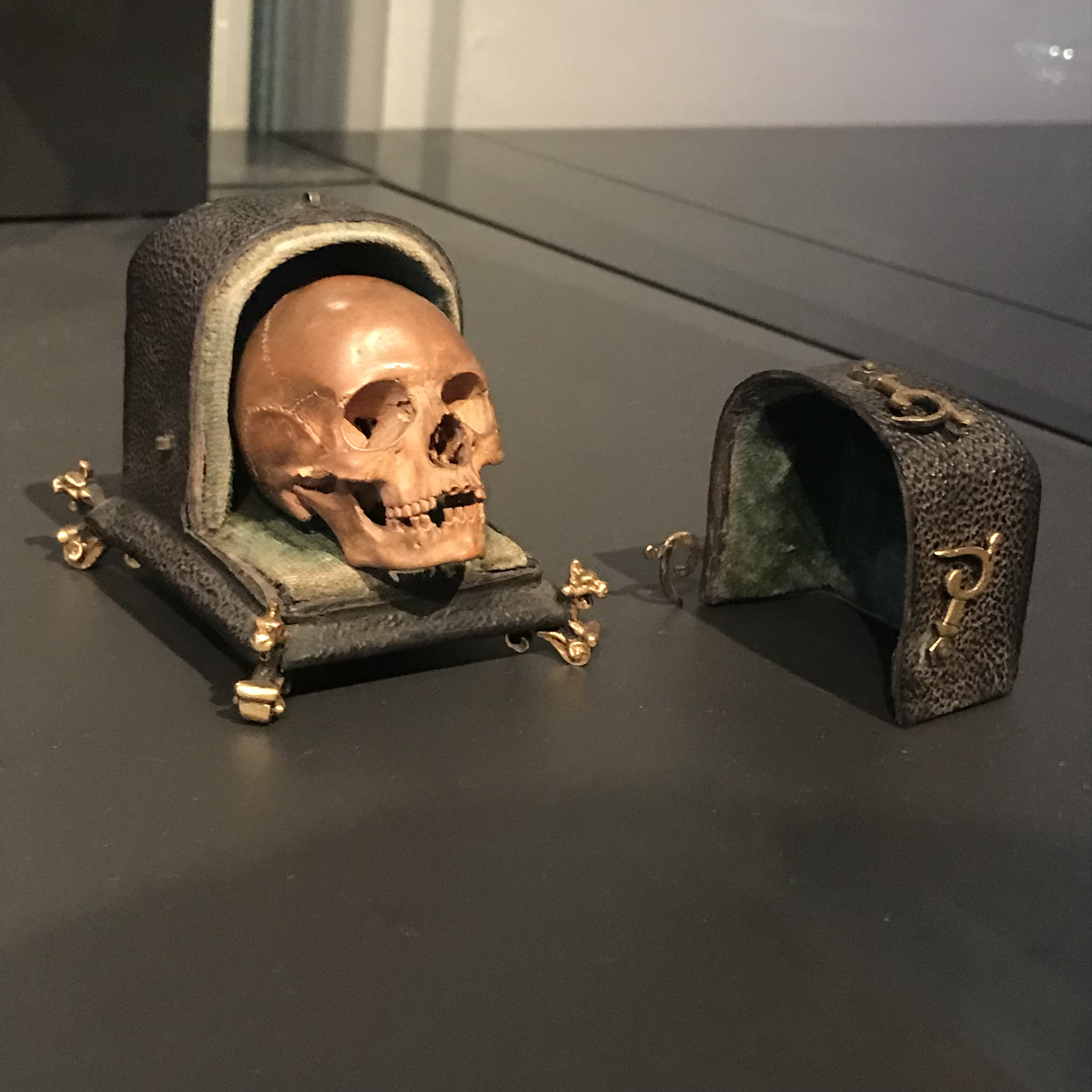
Albert Jansz. Vinckenbrinck - Vanitas Skull With Case, 1650. Rijksmuseum Amsterdam.

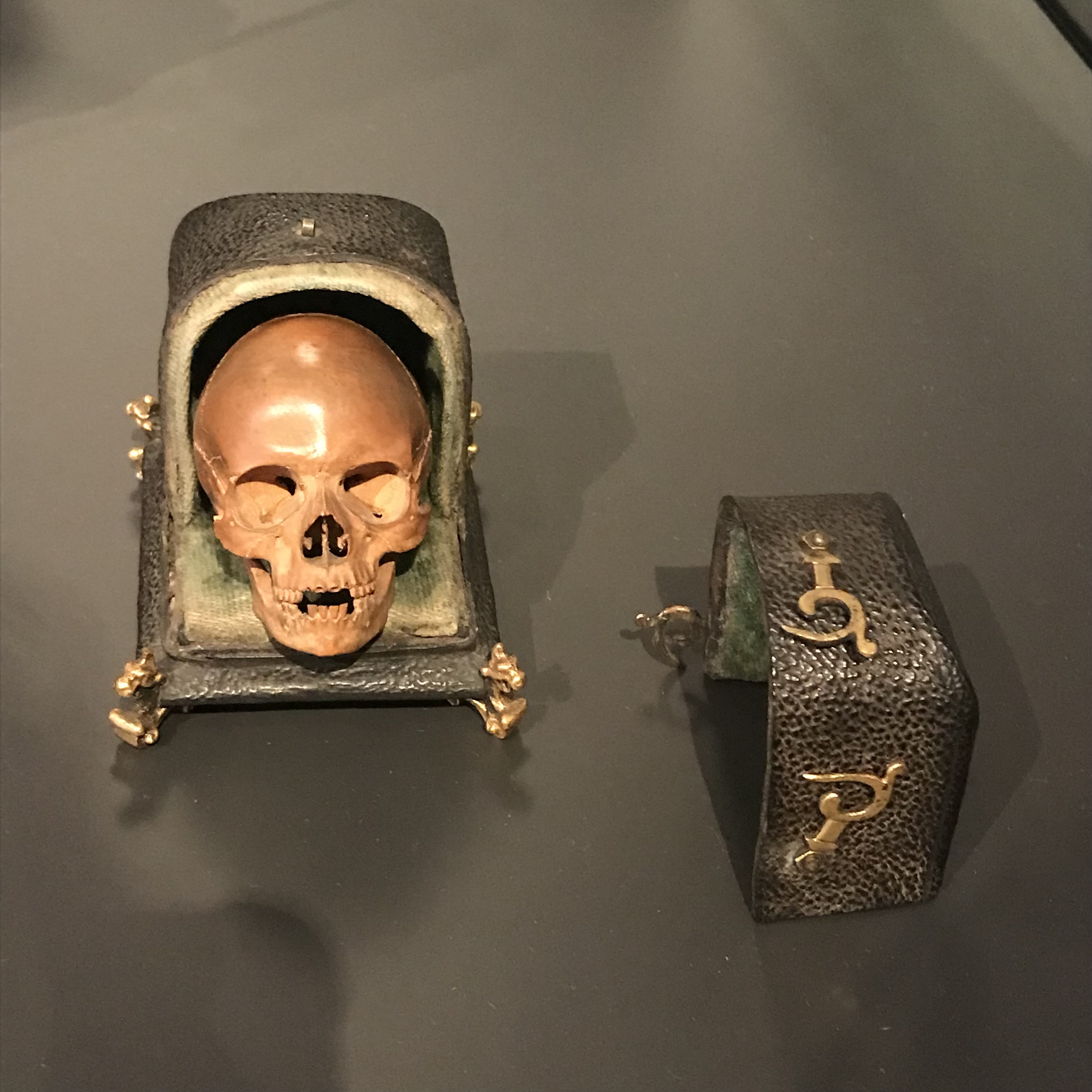
Albert Jansz. Vinckenbrinck - Vanitas Skull With Case, 1650. Rijksmuseum Amsterdam.

== Biography ==
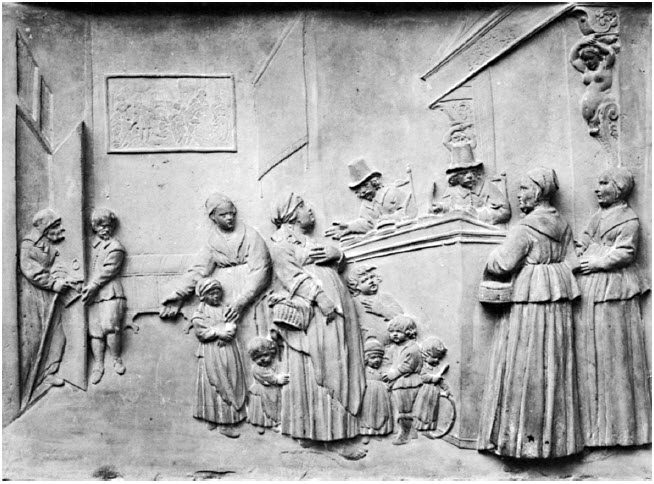
Relief in sandstone from the Amsterdam poorhouse; registering the poor at the almshouse

According to the RKD he was a sculptor who learned from his father and became the father of the sculptors Jan, Hendrik, and Abraham Vinckenbrinck. He married Geertruyt Collaert. He made the pulpit for the Nieuwe kerk, and a sketch of this is in the portrait made of him by the Holsteyn brothers. That print claims he was a "sculptor of the city of Amsterdam". According to the Amsterdam Museum he made the statues of David and Goliath now in their café.
