= Nieuwe Kerk, Amsterdam =

Church in Amsterdam, Netherlands

Nieuwe Kerk
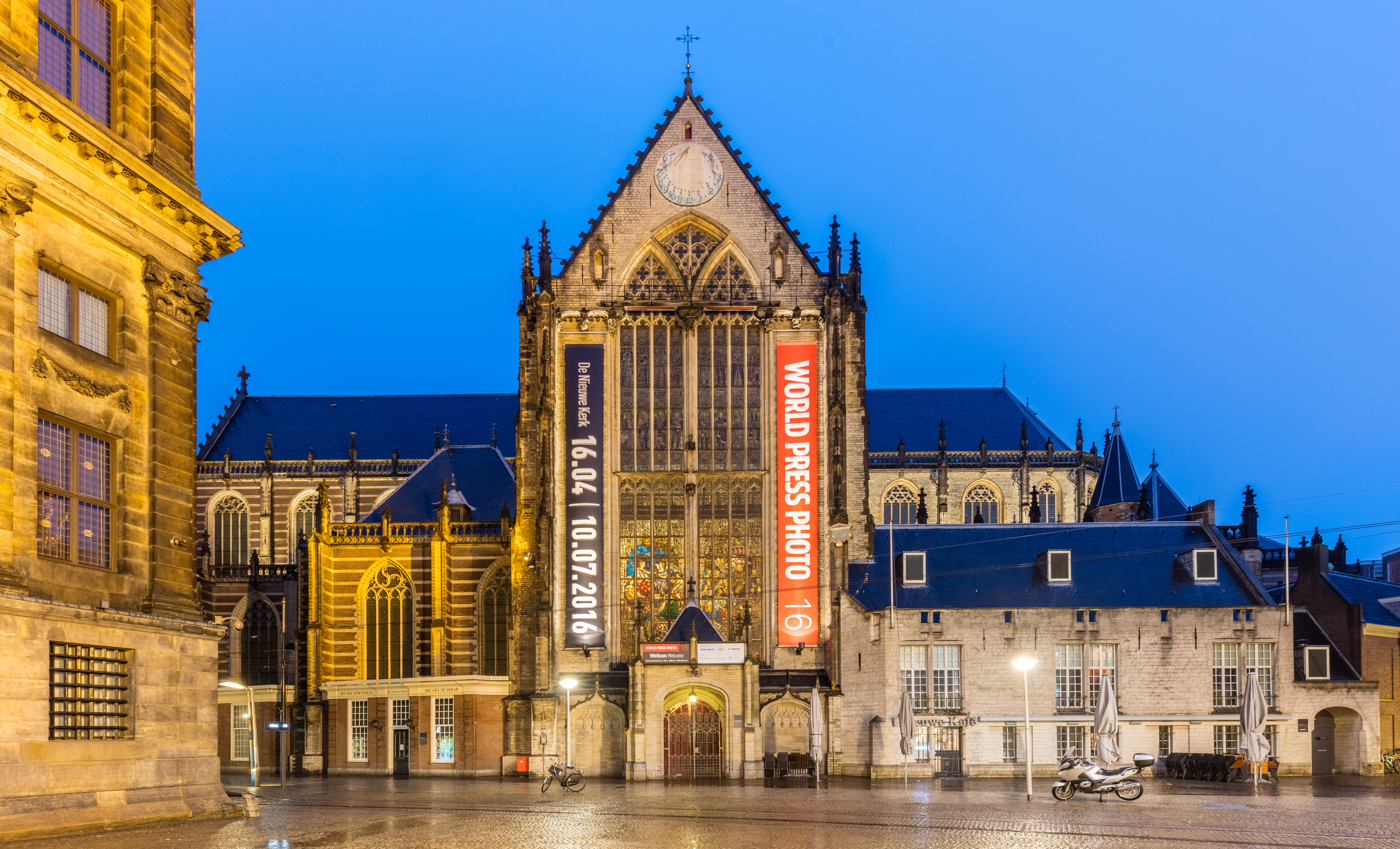
- The Nieuwe Kerk as seen from Dam Square
- Nieuwe Kerk
- 52.3739°N 4.8917°E
- Location: Dam Square, Amsterdam
- Country: The Netherlands
- Denomination: Protestant Church in the Netherlands
- Previous denomination: Catholic

Architecture
- Style: Gothic, neo-Gothic
- Groundbreaking: c. 1385

The Nieuwe Kerk (Dutch: [ˈniu.ə ˈkɛr(ə)k], lit. 'New Church') is a 15th-century church in Amsterdam located on Dam Square, next to the Royal Palace. Originally a Catholic church, it became a Dutch Reformed church in 1578. It now belongs to the Protestant Church in the Netherlands.

== Current uses ==
The Nieuwe Kerk is no longer used for church services but is used as an exhibition space. It is also used for organ recitals. There is a café in one of the buildings attached to the church that has an entrance to the church (during opening hours). There is a museum store inside the entrance that sells postcards, books, and gifts having to do with the church and its exhibitions.

The church is used for Dutch royal investiture ceremonies (as per Article 32 of the Dutch Constitution) most recently that of King Willem-Alexander in 2013, as well as royal weddings, most recently the wedding of Willem-Alexander to Máxima in 2002. The investitures of Queens Wilhelmina, Juliana and Beatrix also took place there.

== History ==
After the Oude Kerk ("Old Church") grew too small for the expanding population of the town, the bishop of Utrecht gave permission to build a second parish church, the Nieuwe Kerk ("New Church"). Construction began in 1380 and finished in 1408. This new church was consecrated in 1409 to St. Mary and St. Catherine, and the first masses were held in 1410.

The church was damaged by the city fires of 1421 and 1452 and burned down almost entirely in 1645, after which it was rebuilt in Gothic style. In 1578 the building became a Dutch Reformed church. It underwent major renovation in 1892–1914, which added many neo-Gothic details, and was again renovated in 1959–80. The second renovation proved expensive for the Dutch Reformed Church, forcing the church to be closed most of the time in order to save money on maintenance. To keep the church open, ownership was transferred in 1979 to a newly formed cultural foundation called the Nationale Stichting De Nieuwe Kerk.

== Notable interments ==
The Nieuwe Kerk is a burial site for Dutch naval heroes, including Admiral Michiel de Ruyter, Commodore Jan van Galen, and lieutenant commander Jan van Speyk. Despite being Catholic, the poet and playwright Joost van den Vondel is buried in the church.

== Gallery ==
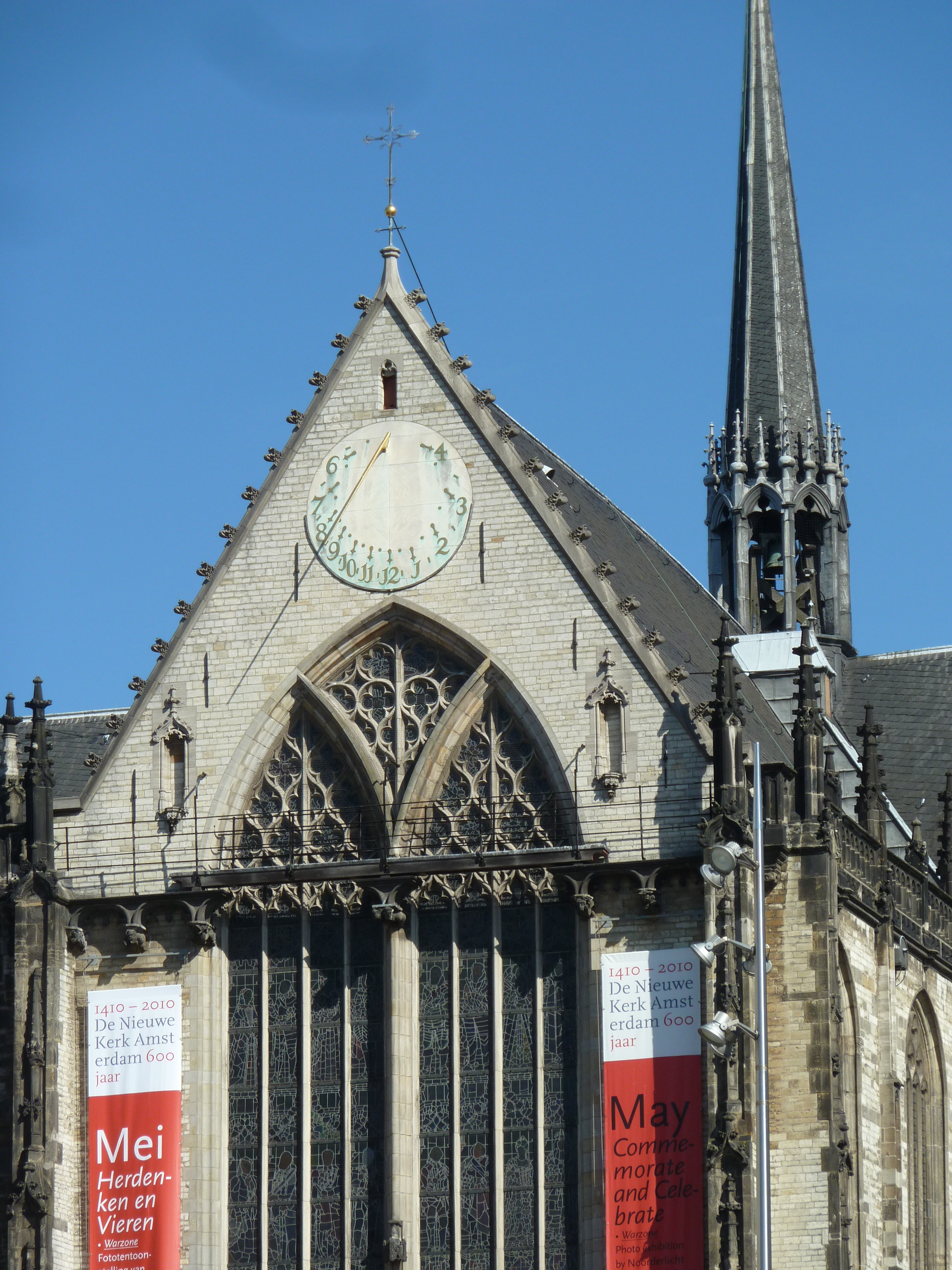
Sun dial on West side

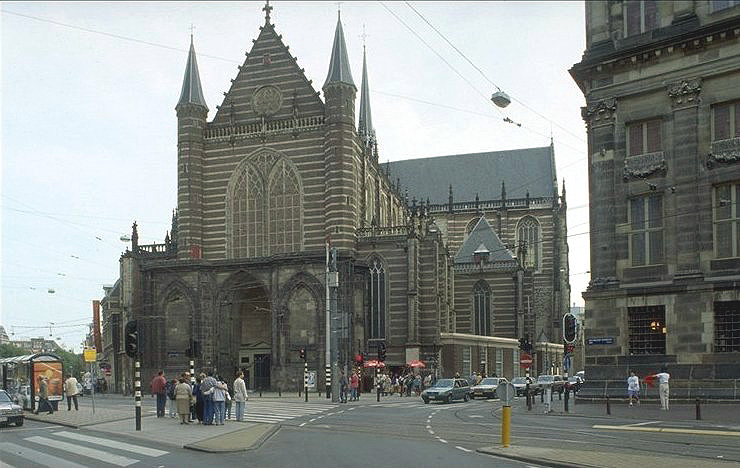
Original entrance (the former stained-glass window was bricked up when the organ was installed)

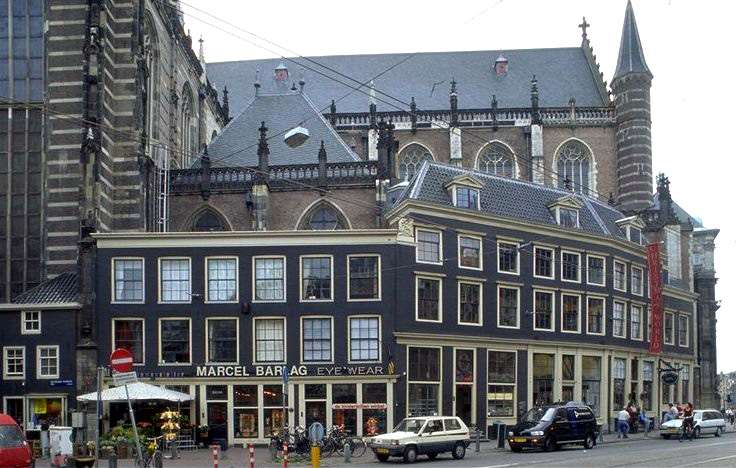
Houses built up against the church

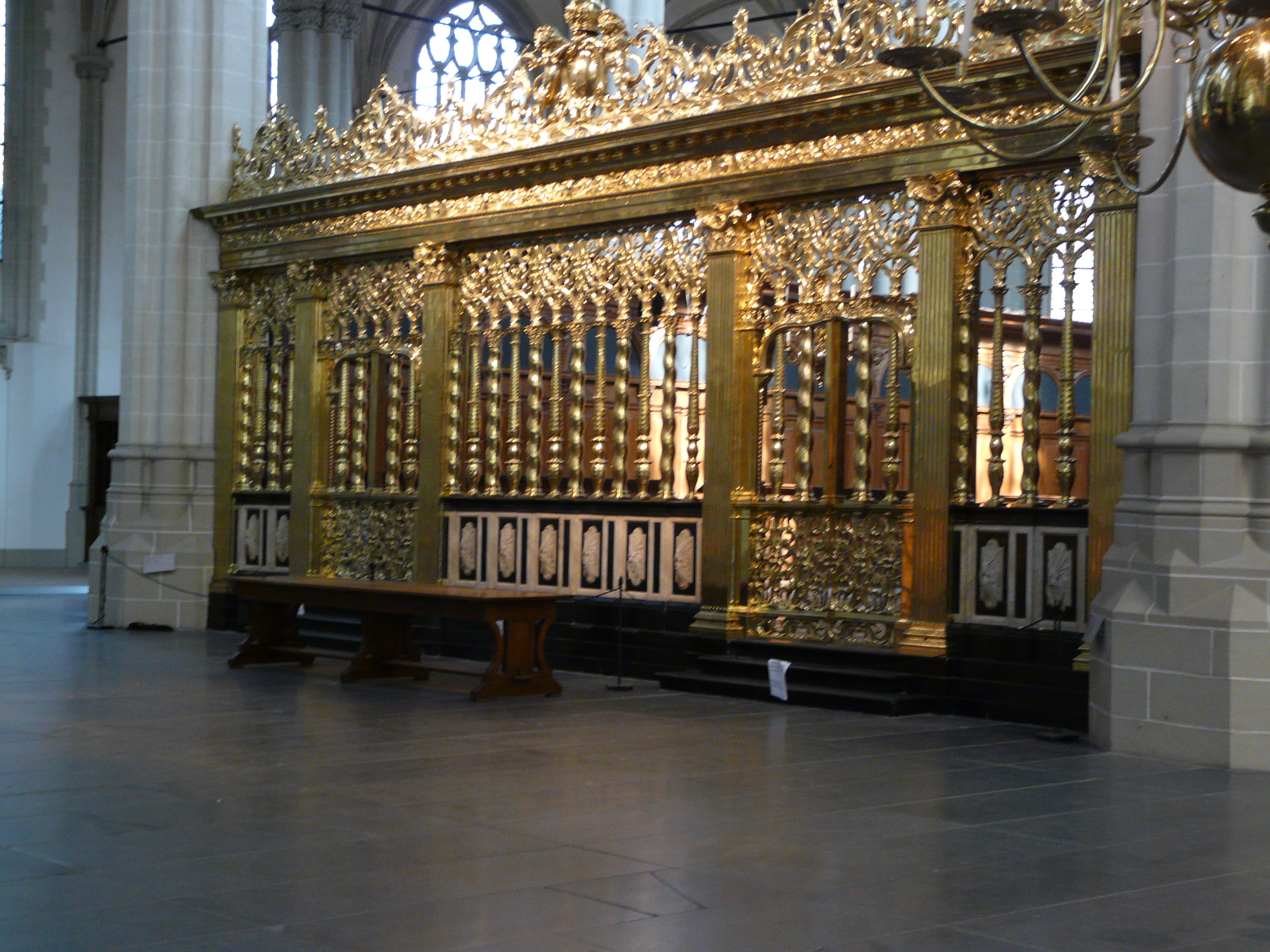
Choir gate by Johannes Lutma

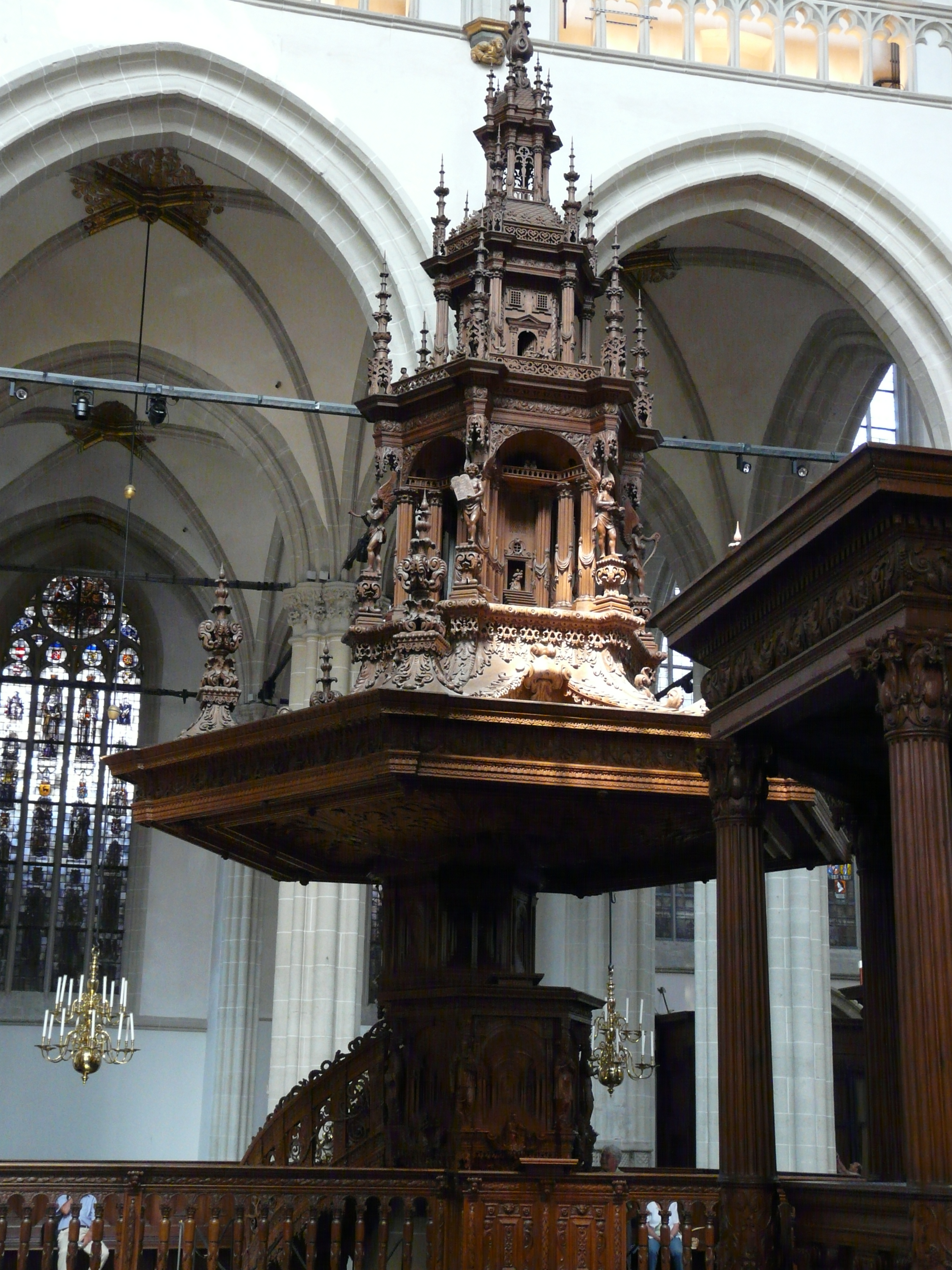
Pulpit by Albert Jansz Vinckenbrinck

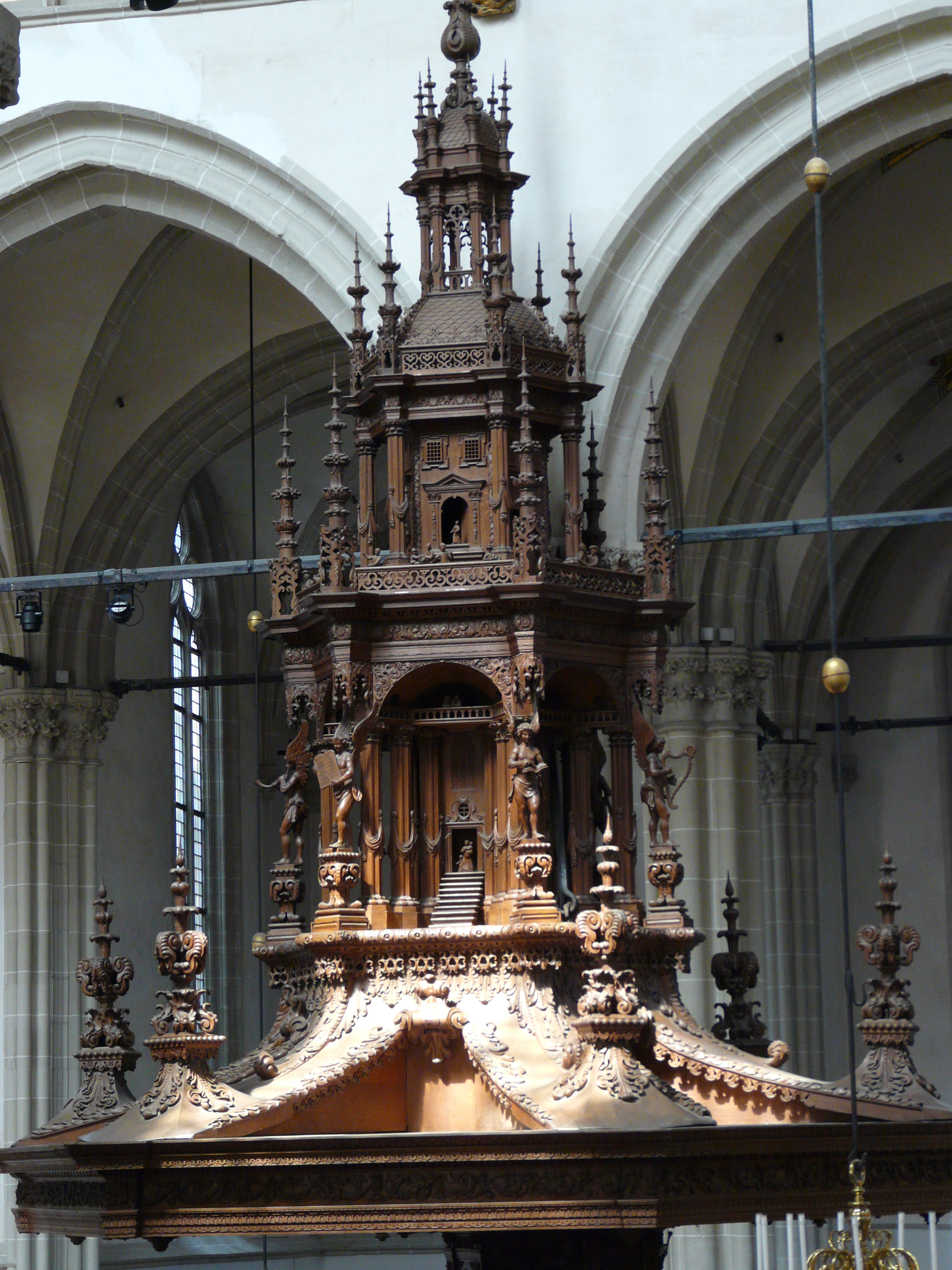
Detail of pulpit sounding board (from above)

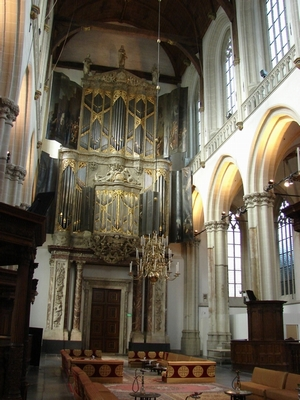
Organ

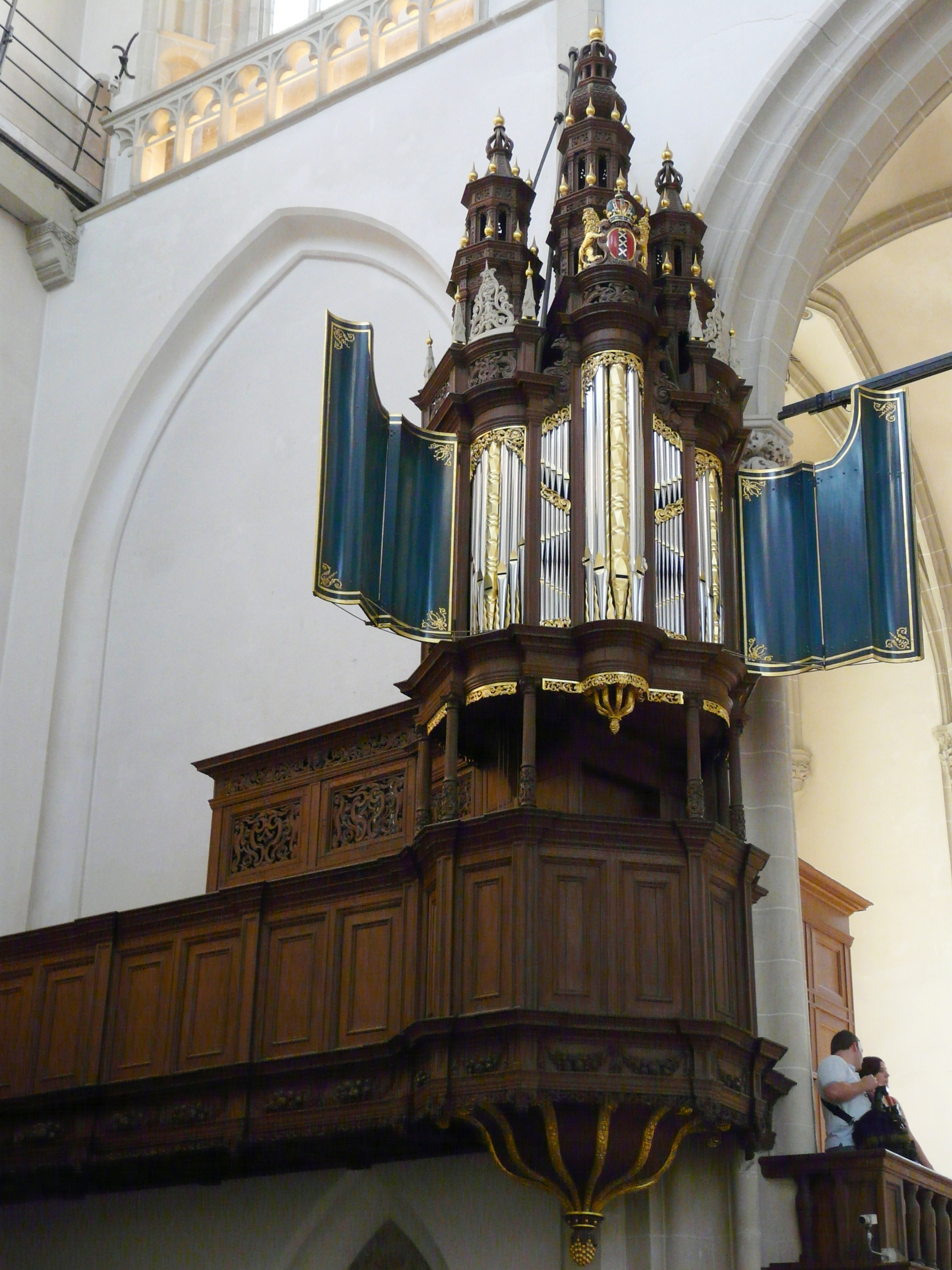
Transept organ (Van Hagerbeer 1645/Flentrop 1989)

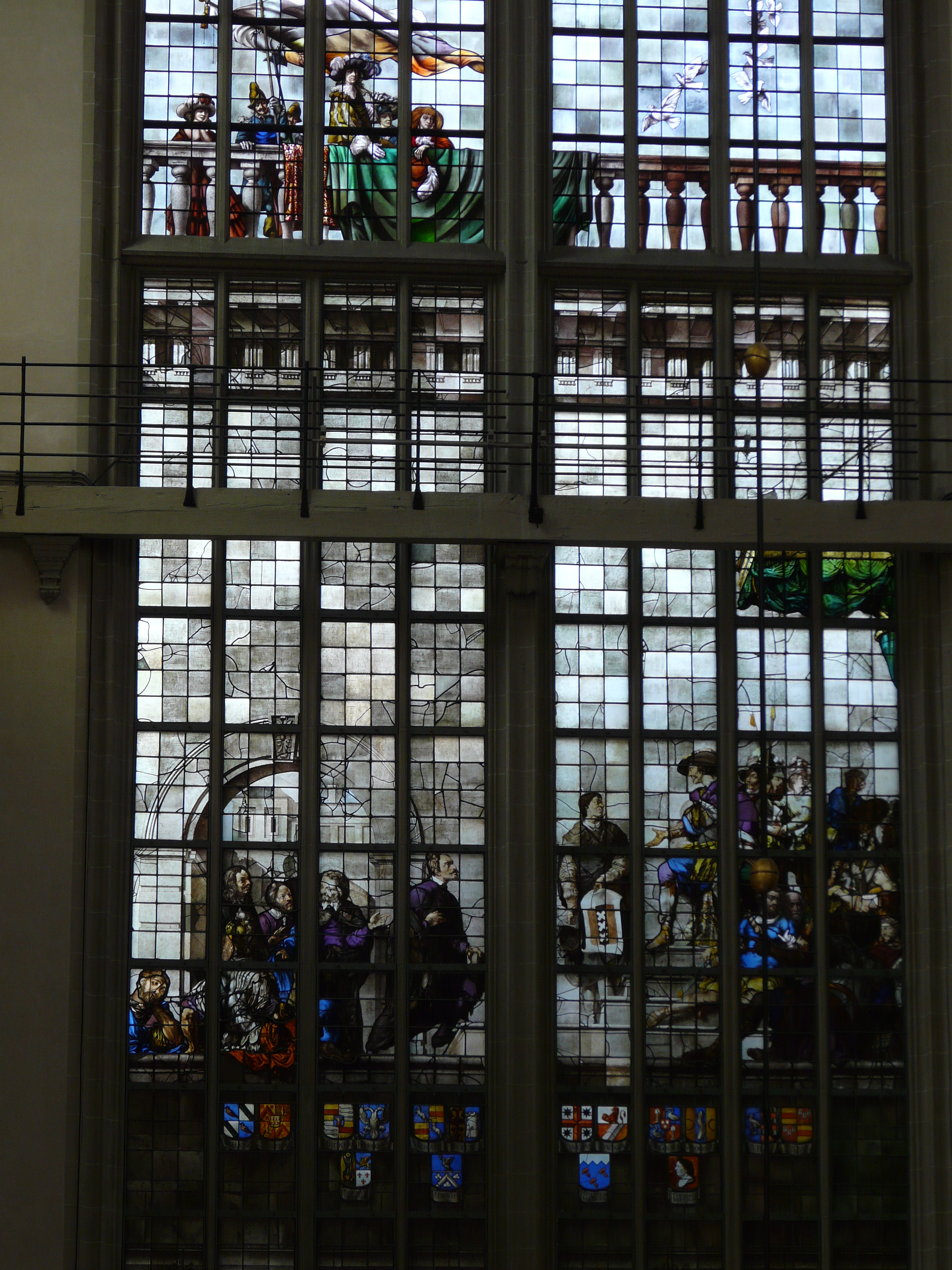
Stained-glass window of William IV, Count of Holland awarding the coat of arms to Amsterdam in 1342

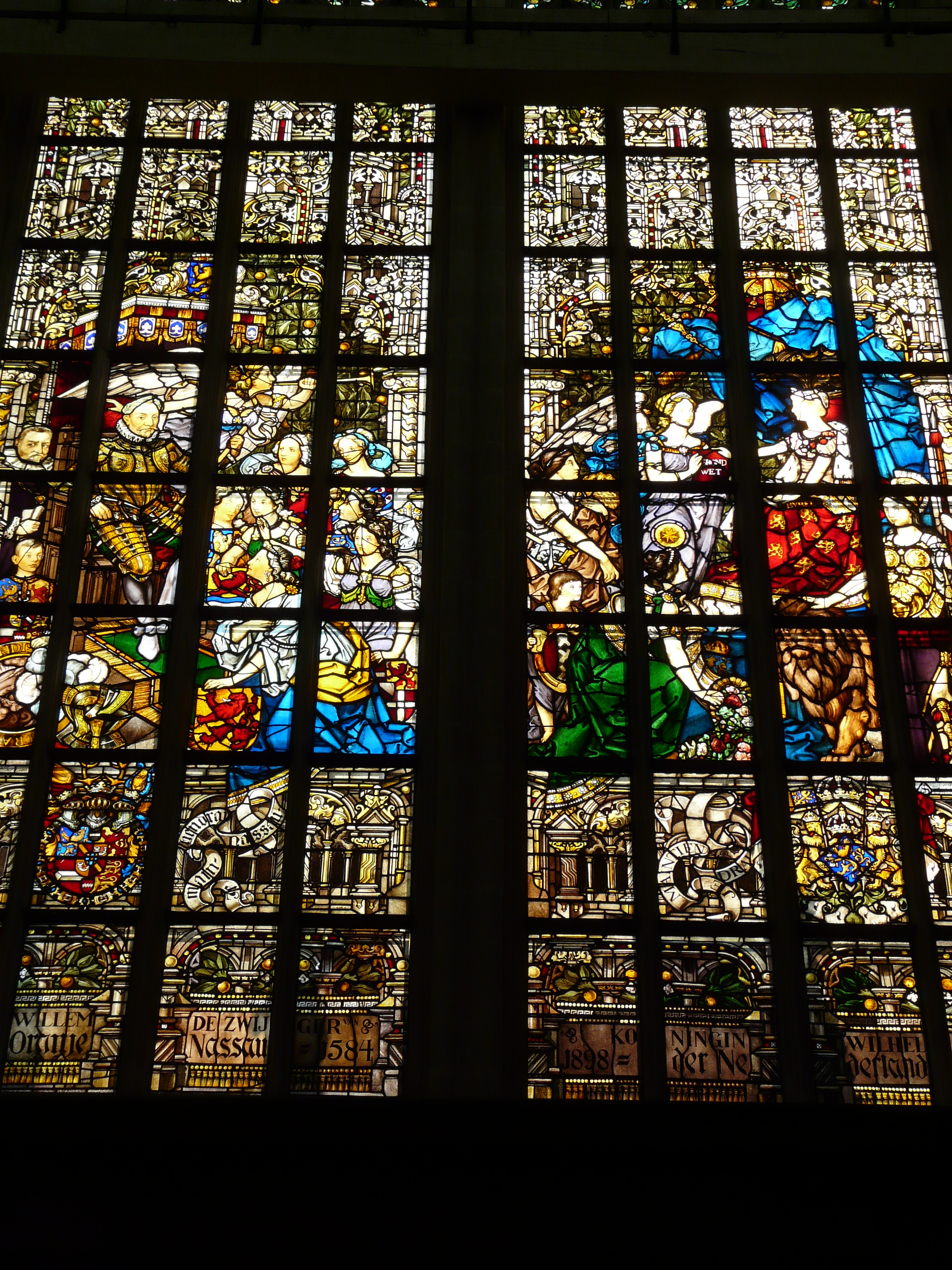
Stained-glass window

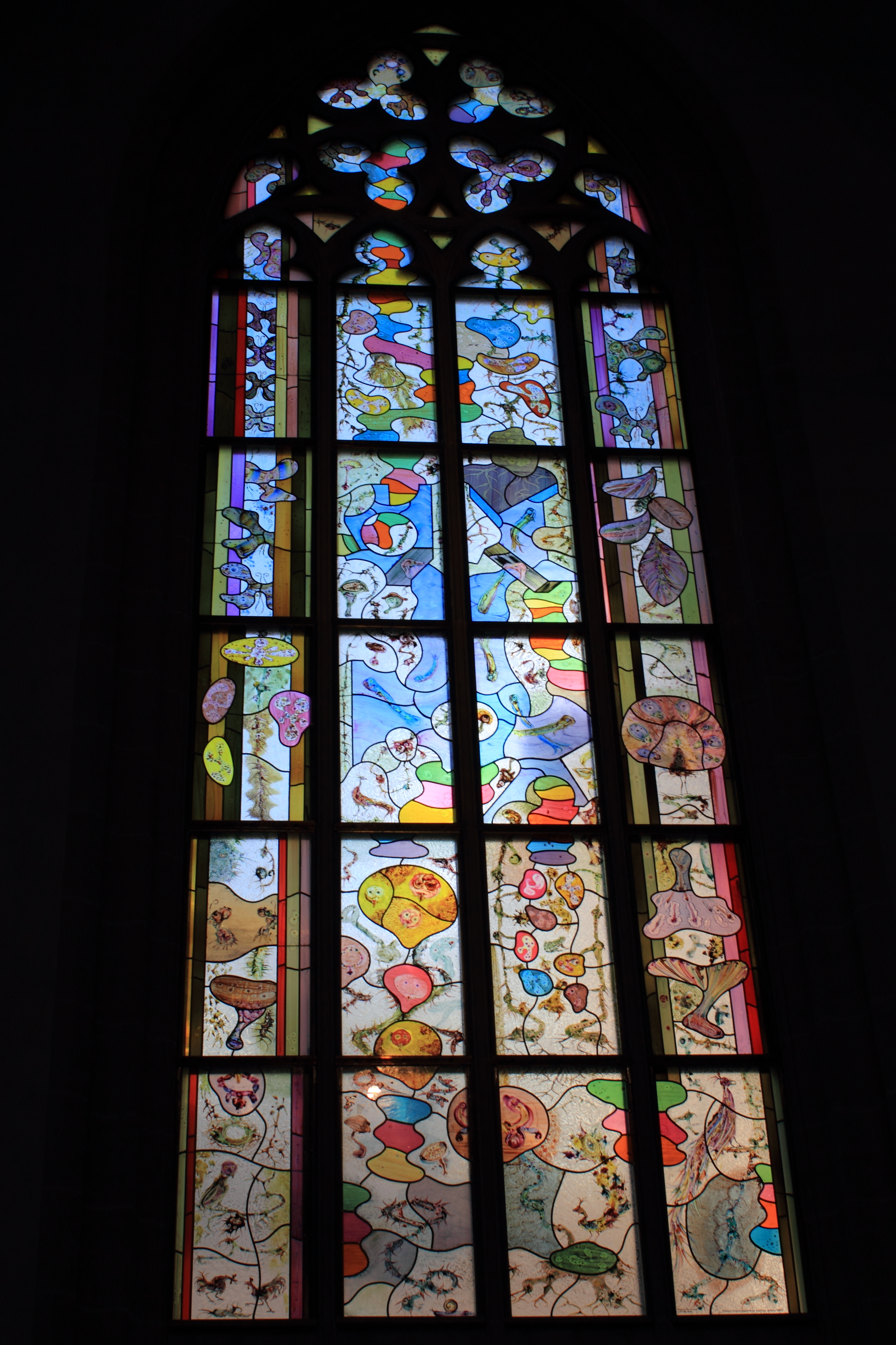
A Garden of Glass

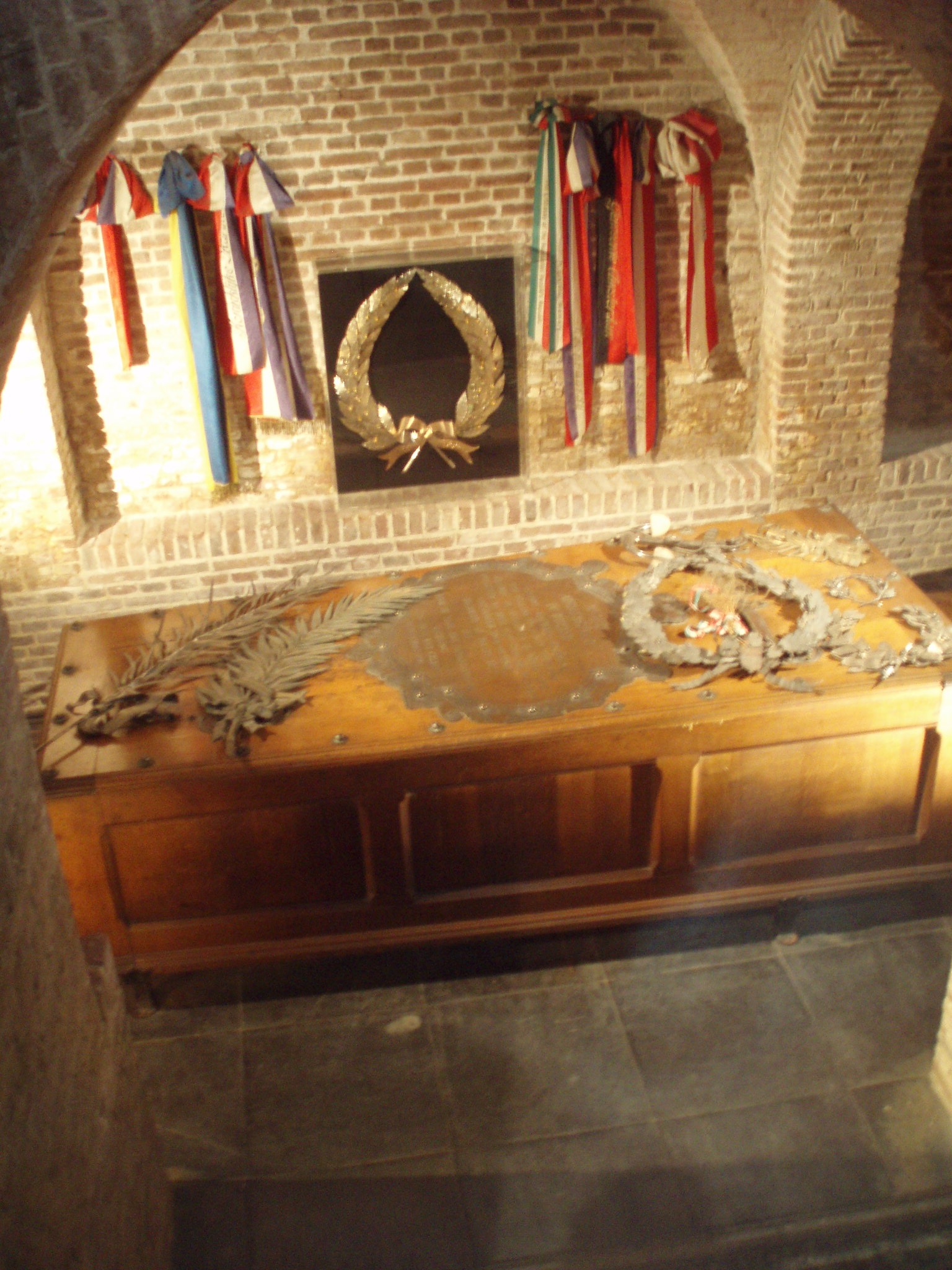
Michiel de Ruyter coffin under the monument

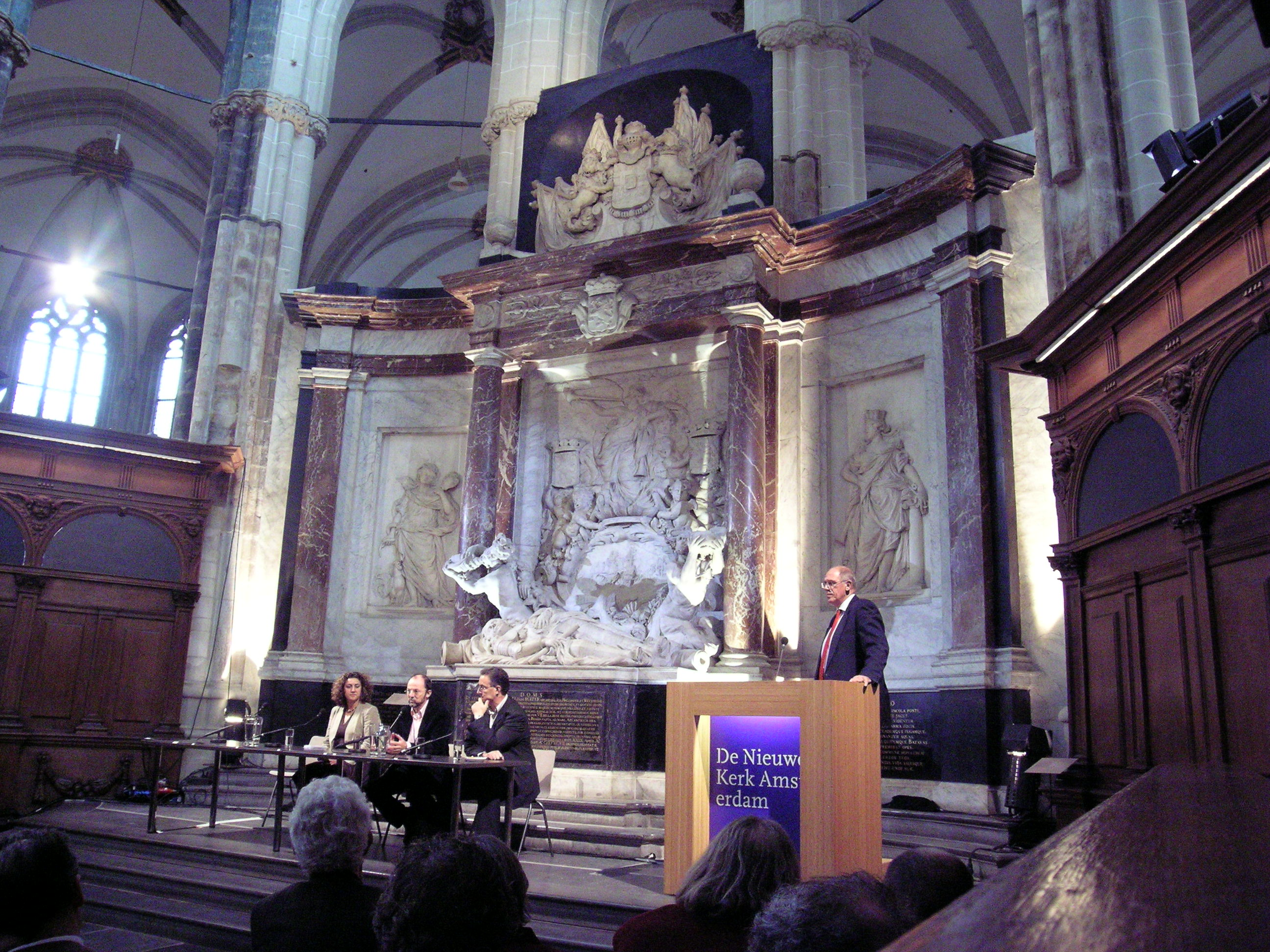
Panel presentation and discussion in front of Michiel de Ruyter memorial monument.

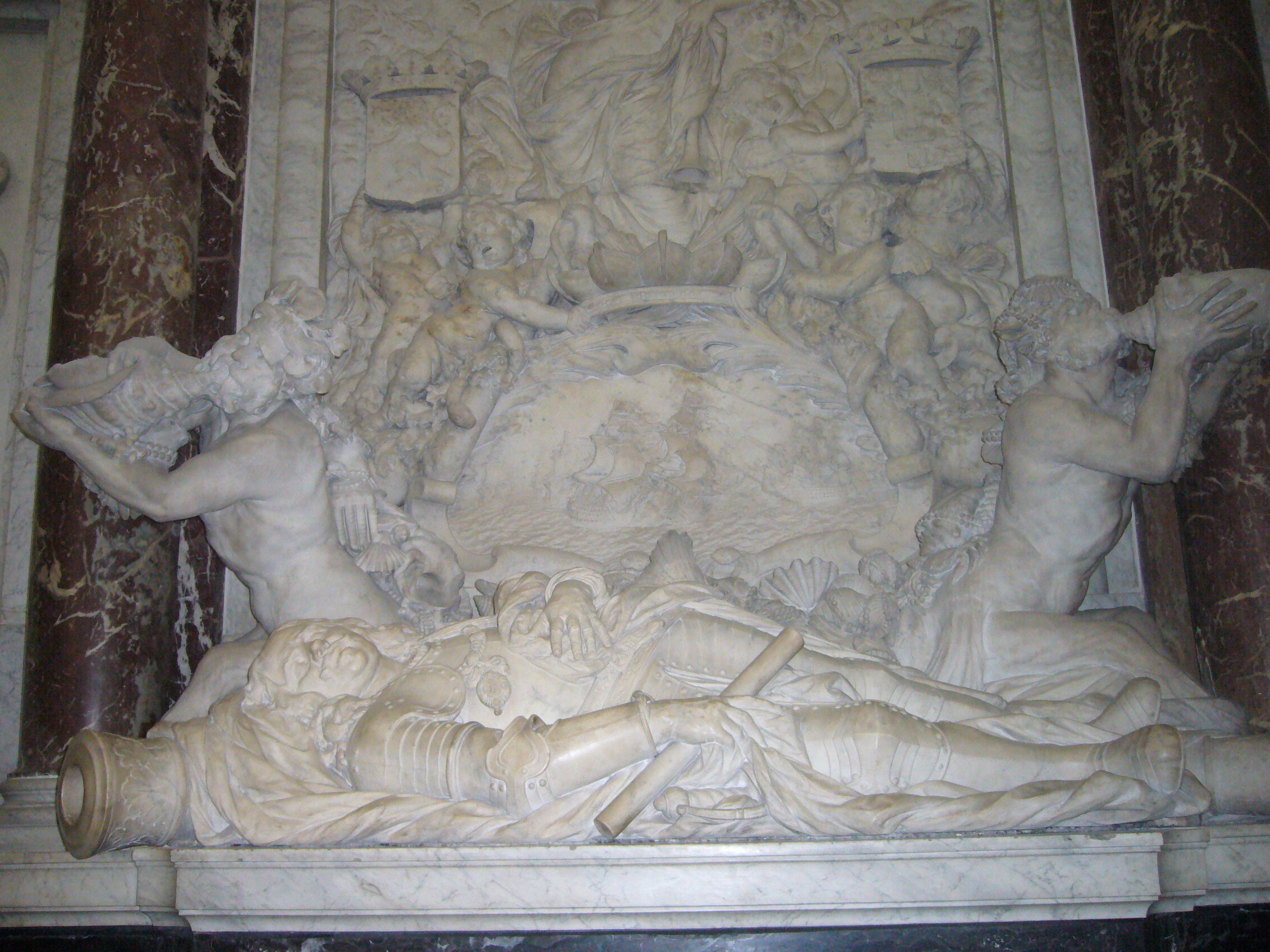
Michiel de Ruyter memorial (detail) by Rombout Verhulst

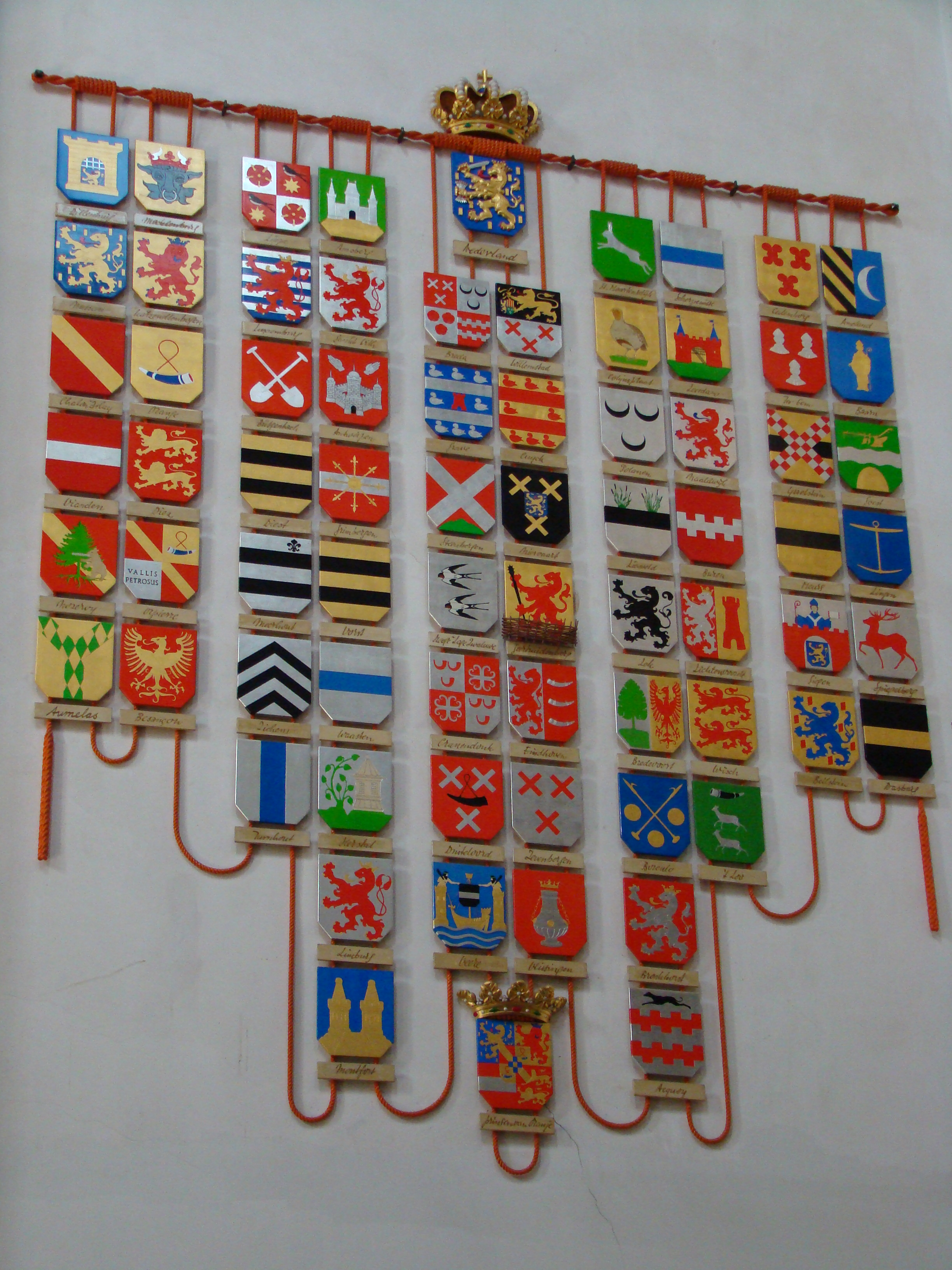
Coats of arms with the titles of the Dutch head of state

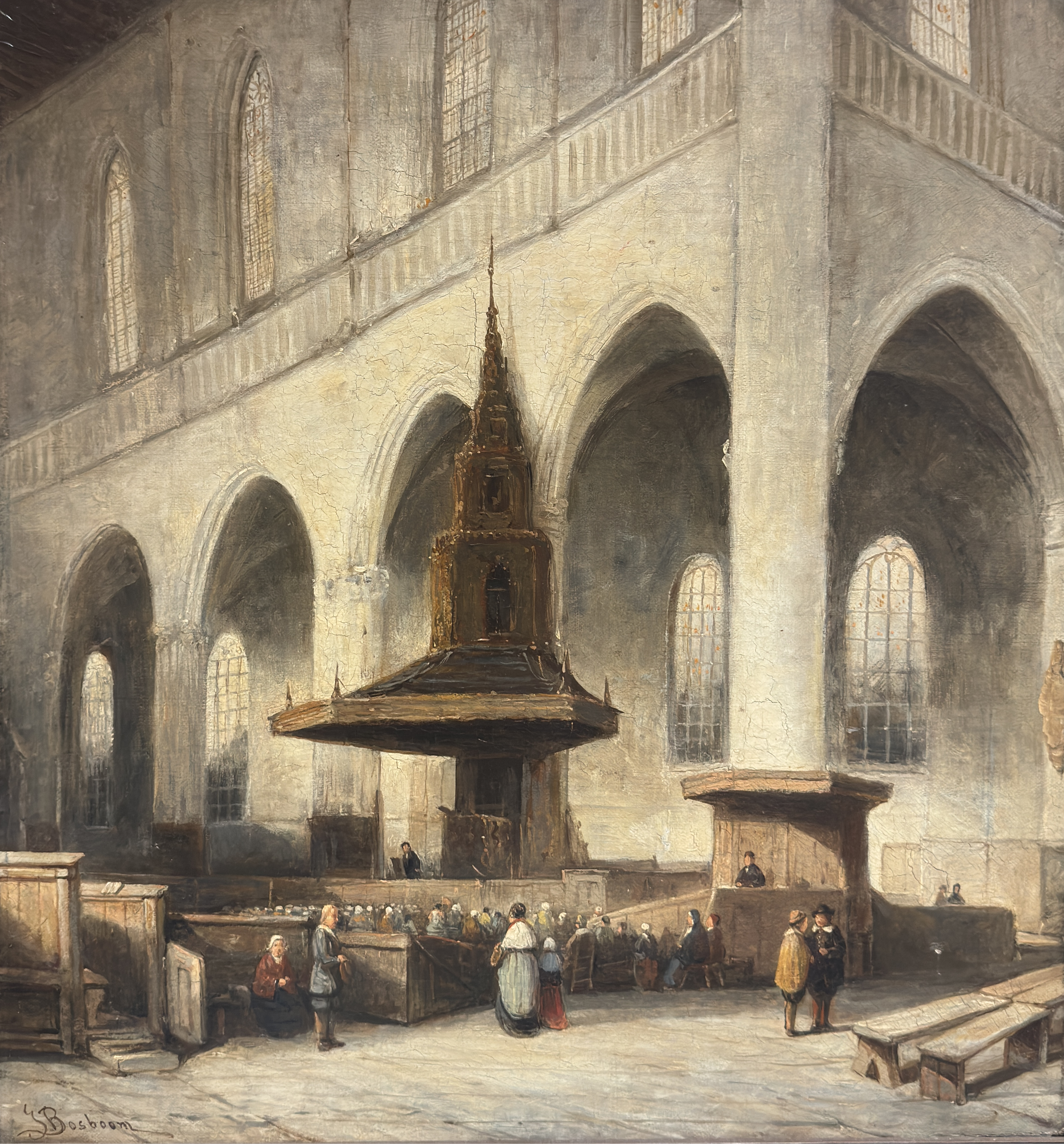
Johannes Bosboom — "Inneres einer gotischen Kirche" c. 1870 — oil on canvas depicting Amsterdam's Nieuwe Kerk
