= A Garden of Glass =

Stained glass window in Netherlands

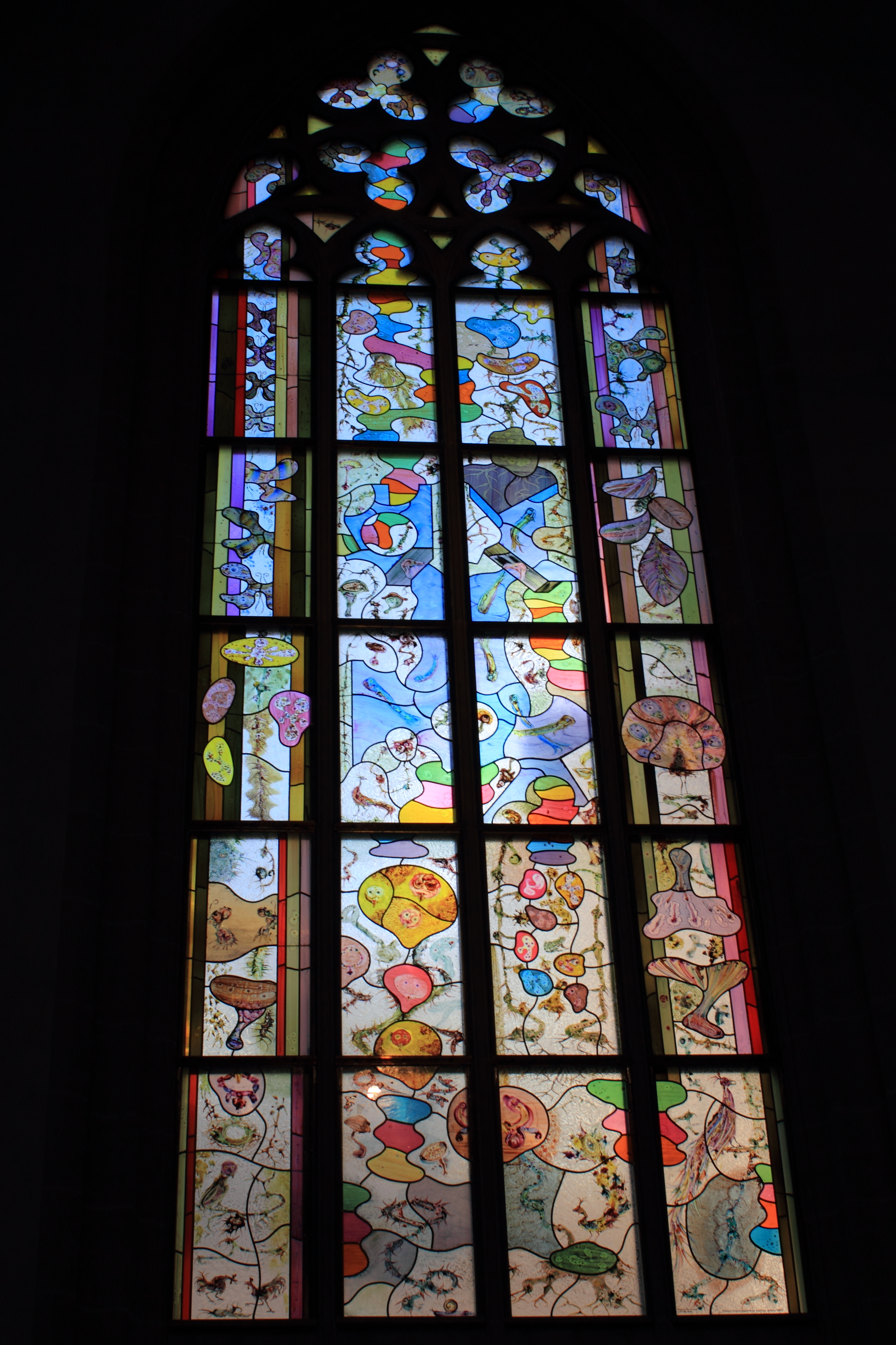
- Een tuin van glas
- Artist: Marc Mulders
- Year: 2005
- Location: Nieuwe Kerk, Netherlands
- Coordinates: 52°22′26″N 4°53′31″E

A Garden of Glass refers to a stained glass window in the Nieuwe Kerk, Amsterdam, designed and installed for the silver jubilee of Queen Beatrix in 2005, by the artist Marc Mulders.

In 2004 the National Committee for the Silver Jubilee of Queen Beatrix was formed. The committee settled on a stained glass window in the Nieuwe Kerk as a fitting memorial as that is the location where the Queen was inaugurated. The window is made up of 40 individual panels that include various mushrooms, flowers and butterflies. It hangs opposite the commemorative window from 1995 celebrating 50 years of freedom. A book was published the same year by Lien Heyting about the window, explaining the symbolism of the various figures.

The next year Marc Mulders made a stained-glass window commemorating the re-opening of Museum Catharijneconvent with the theme Apocalypse and on 2 September 2016 he made a stained-glass window commemorating Erasmus which was installed in the Janskerk, Gouda.

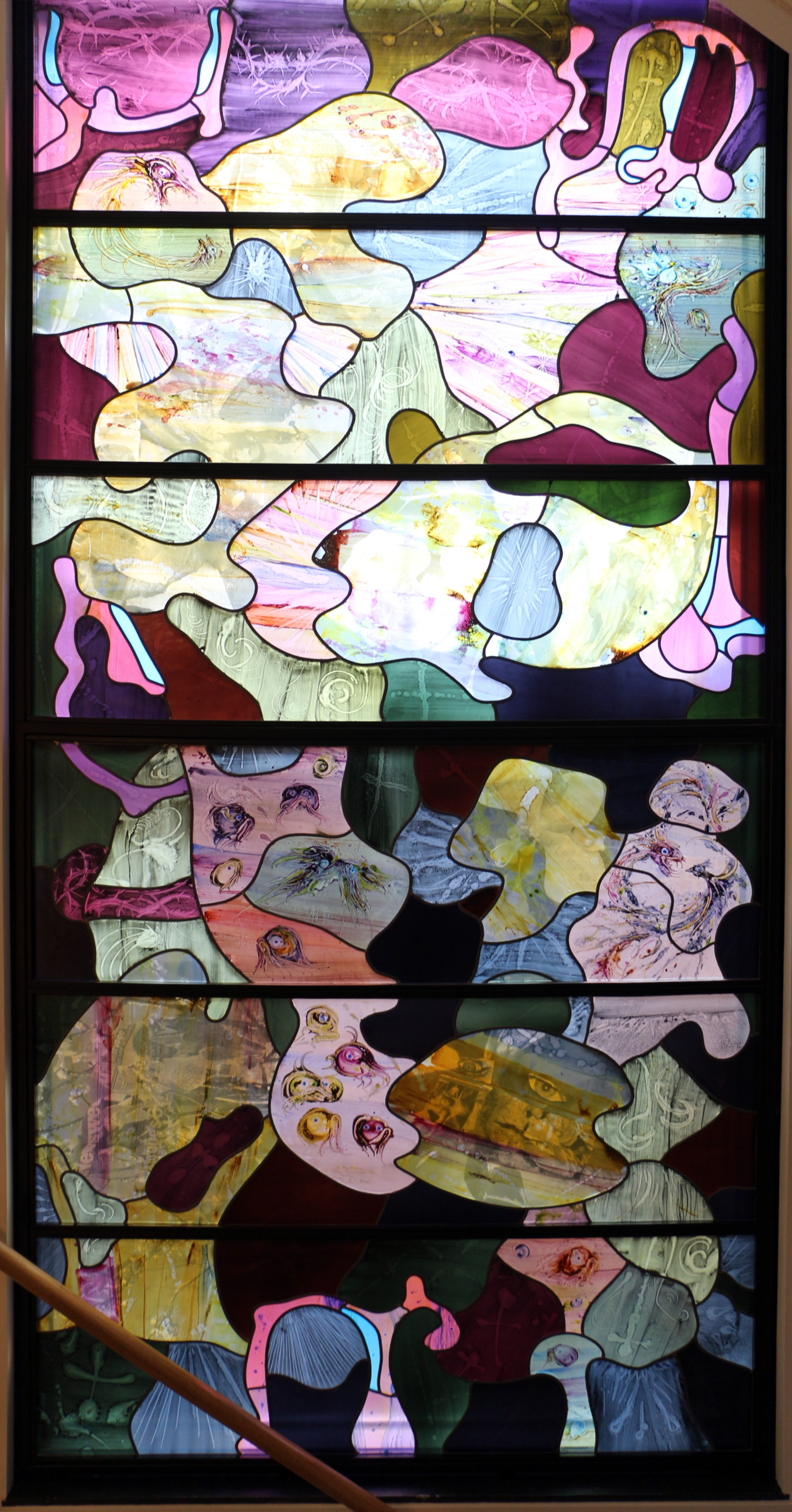
Apocalypse (detail), Utrecht

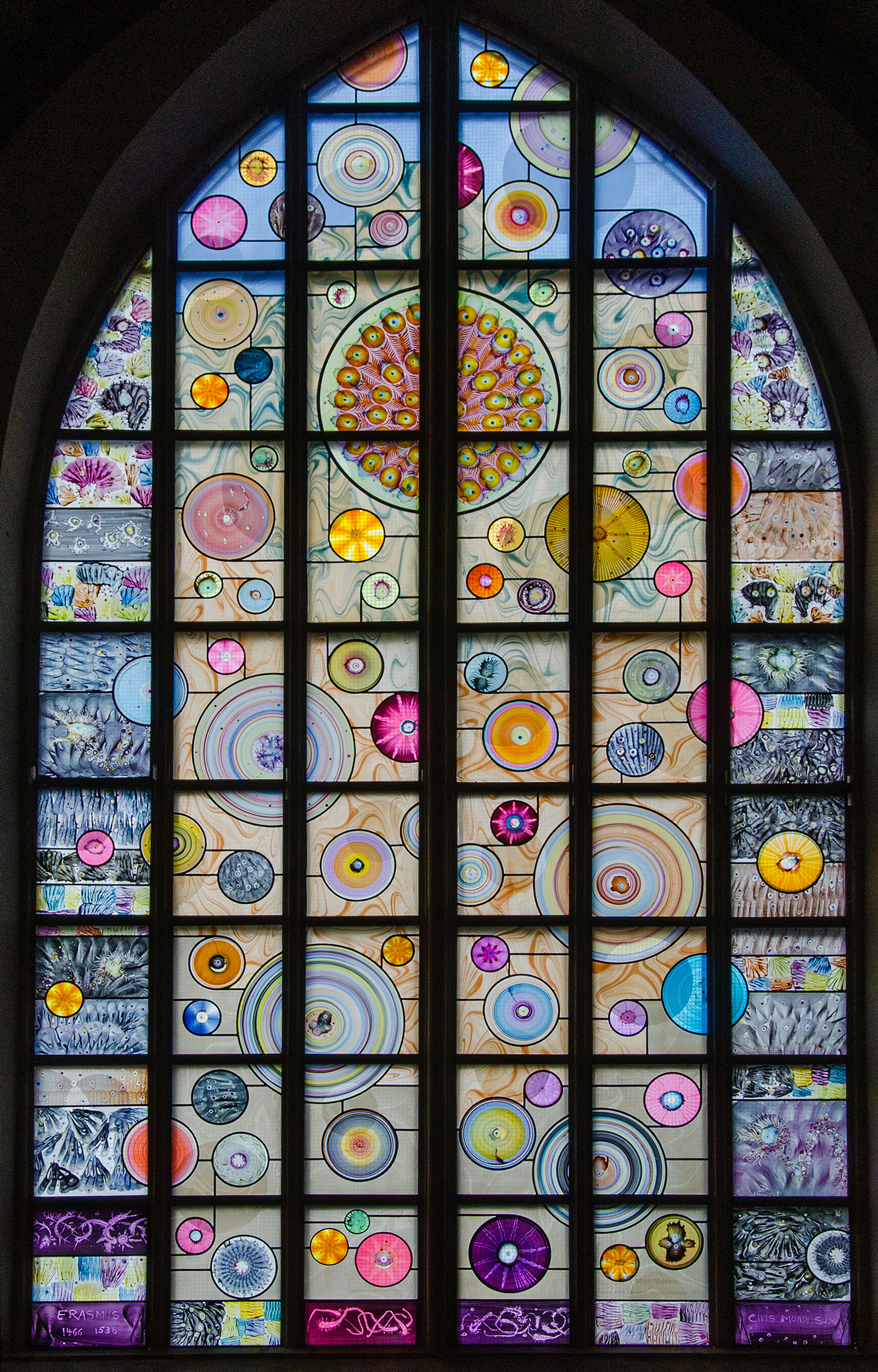
Erasmus window, Gouda
