= Mindfulness (disambiguation) =

Mindfulness is the practice of purposely bringing one's attention to one's mental processes occurring in the present moment without judgment.

Mindfulness may also refer to:

- Mindfulness (book), a 1989 book by Ellen Langer
- Mindfulness or Sati, a spiritual faculty that forms an essential part of Buddhist practice
- Mindfulness (journal), an academic journal on psychology
