= Stichting MIND =

Mental health charity in the Netherlands

MIND
- Logo of the charity
- Formation: 23 November 2016
- Headquarters: Amersfoort
- Region served: Netherlands
- Managing director: Mw. M (Marjan) ter Avest
- Website: wijzijnmind.nl

Stichting MIND (lit. 'MIND Foundation') is a mental health charity in the Netherlands founded in 2016.

Each January MIND organizes the "Blue Monday" event in collaboration with Orange Fund. The event was promoted by Queen Máxima on her Instagram account.

MIND started a petition to the Dutch Senate for reduction of cost of mental health help for the youth.
