= Mind (disambiguation) =

A mind is the set of cognitive faculties that enables memory, consciousness, perception, thinking and judgement.

Mind(s) may also refer to:

== Arts, entertainment, and media ==
=== Music ===
- "Mind" (song), by The Farm
- "Mind", a song by Talking Heads from their 1979 album Fear of Music
- "Mind", a song by System of a Down from their album System Of A Down
- "Mind", a song by Jack Ü from their album Skrillex and Diplo Present Jack Ü

=== Periodicals ===
- Mind (journal), the British journal of analytic philosophy
- Microsoft Internet Developer (MIND), a magazine by Microsoft

=== Other uses in arts, entertainment, and media ===
- Mind (The Culture), self-conscious, hyperintelligent machines in the novels of Iain M. Banks
- MiND: Media Independence, an Internet television service
- Mind: Path to Thalamus, a 2014 video game
- Minds (social network), an encrypted start-up social media platform backed by Anonymous
- Mothers and Daughters (comics) (Minds), the fourth book in the Mothers and Daughters graphic by Dave Sim, and the 11th collected Cerebus the Aardvark volume

== Organizations ==
- Mind (charity), a mental health charity based in the United Kingdom
- Stichting MIND, a mental health charity based in the Netherlands
- MIND High School, a high school in Montreal, Quebec, Canada
- MIND Institute, a neuroscience research facility at the University of California, Davis
- MINDS, a welfare organisation for the mentally disabled in Singapore
- Milan Innovation District, a science and technology park in Milan, Italy
- MinD ('Mensa in Deutschland'), the German branch of Mensa International

== Other uses ==
- MinD, a protein
- Gottfried Mind (1768–1814), Swiss artist
- The Thunder, Perfect Mind, a Gnostic work

== See also ==
- Brain
- Cognition
- Intelligence
- Mentalese
- Mindfulness (disambiguation)
- Philosophy of mind
