= Meld =

Meld may refer to:

== Arts and entertainment ==
- Meld (cards), a set of matching cards in card games
- Meld, a set of tiles in the game of Mahjong
- "Meld" (Star Trek: Voyager), an episode of the television series Star Trek: Voyager
- Meld, original name of Slipknot, an American heavy metal band

== Other uses ==
- Meld Stakes, an annual Thoroughbred horse race in Ireland
- Meld (horse) (1952–1977), a British Thoroughbred racehorse
- Meld (software), a computer program for viewing the differences between files
- Meld, a British Rail Class 55 locomotive

== See also ==
- Vulcan mind meld, in Star Trek
- Melding (disambiguation)
