= Flags of the Dutch royal family =

Royal Standard of the Netherlands
- Use: Standard of the Monarch
- Proportion: 1:1
- Adopted: 27 August 1908
- Design: Orange field divided in four by a nassau-blue cross, showing bugle-horns of the Principality of Orange and the coat of arms of the Kingdom, surrounded by a crown and the insignia of the Military Order of William.

The flags of the Dutch royal family are a set of flags used to identify a member of the royal family. The current system of flags for the Dutch monarch, princes, and princesses was introduced in 1908.

== Background ==
The current system of personal flags for the monarch and other members of the royal family was introduced in 1908. In 1907, minor modifications were introduced to the Dutch coat of arms; likewise, a new flag for the Dutch monarch was introduced the following year. These flags are designed by the High Council of Nobility (who are also responsible for heraldry of the royal family) and are granted by royal decree. Like their coats of arms, these flags are usually shared among siblings.

The flags follow a similar pattern and, although not banners of arms, are heavily influenced by heraldry. Flags of those born into the royal family feature a Nassau-blue cross on an orange field, while the colours are reversed for those who marry into the family. Males have near-square flags, while those of females are swallowtailed. Elements of an individual's family coat of arms are also incorporated into the flags.

== Use ==
The flags are used to mark the presence of an individual in certain buildings, when on vehicles (e.g. a car or ship), or in an army unit. The flag of the monarch is flown above Huis ten Bosch Palace in The Hague (the king's private residence) and above Noordeinde Palace in The Hague (the king's official residence) when the monarch is in the Netherlands, but not necessarily when he is actually resident. Besides these two residences, the royal standard is flown above other palaces, castles or estates where and when the King is present.

The flags are never flown at half-mast; during a period of mourning, a black pennon is affixed to the flagpole flying the flag.

== Royal standard ==
The royal flag (Dutch: koninklijke vlag), or the royal standard of the Netherlands, is the official flag of the Dutch monarch. This flag is a non-personal distinctive flag and is not changed from reign to reign. The current flag, introduced in 1908, is a square orange flag, divided in four quarters by a nassau-blue cross. These colours refer to the principality of Orange (in France) and the principality of Nassau (in Germany) from which the present royal family originates.

In the centre of the flag is the lesser coat of arms of the Kingdom (which originates as a composite of features taken from the arms of the house of Nassau and the arms of the Dutch republic) surmounted by a royal crown and surrounded by the insignia of the Grand Cross of the Military William Order. Each quarter shows a bugle-horn, which originates in arms of the principality of Orange.

Principality of Orange

House of Nassau

Netherlands

Upon the accession of King Willem-Alexander in 2013, the monarch's flag was slightly modified: Instead of a rosette, a bow is placed in the ribbon of the Military William Order. Furthermore, the tassels on the horns now both hang down. The adjustments were applied on 30 April 2013 immediately after Willem-Alexander ascended the throne

Flag	Usage	Notes
	1908–2013	The flag introduced in 1908 was modified slightly in 2013, on the accession of King Willem-Alexander.
	1815–1908	Before 1908, the flag used by the monarch was a rectangular flag with the colours of the national flag. Within the centre white band was the coat of arms as it appeared during the time (without the mantle).

== Princes ==
The standard of a Dutch prince is rectangular and of proportions 5:6. Flags of princes born into the royal family consist of a Nassau-blue cross on an orange field.

Instead of the hunting horn of Orange in the upper right and the lower left quarters found in the monarch's standard, these are replaced with insignia obtained from the coat of arms of the family of the prince's parent who married into the royal family.

Unlike the monarch's standard, the coat of arms of the kingdom is not surrounded by the insignia of the Great Cross of the Military Order of William, but is placed within an orange circle which replaces the centre of the cross.

Standard	Member of the Royal Family	Description
	Prince of the Netherlands (Sons of Beatrix); Willem-Alexander, Constantijn and Friso	As princes of the Netherlands, the sons of Beatrix use a 5:6 rectangular flag with the colours of the royal standard and figures representing their maternal side (the horn of Orange) and their paternal side (the white tower of Von Amsberg) as difference. The arms of the Netherlands without the insignia of the Military Order of William is within an orange circle.
	Prince of Orange-Nassau (Sons of Margriet); Maurits, Bernhard, Pieter-Christiaan and Floris	As princes of Orange-Nassau, the sons of Princess Margiet use a 5:6 rectangular flag with the colours of the royal standard and figures representing their maternal side (the horn of Orange) and their paternal side (the white six pointed stars of Van Vollenhoven). The arms of the Netherlands without the insignia of the Military Order of William is within an orange circle.
	Prince of the Netherlands (1898–1908)	The former standard for Dutch princes was a flag with the colours of the historical royal standard, with the royal coat of arms in an orange rectangle at the central band.

== Princesses ==
The flag of a Dutch princess is swallowtailed in shape and of proportions 5:6. Flags of princesses born into the royal family consist of a Nassau-blue cross on an orange field, while the flags of princesses by marriage are reversed.

Unlike the flags for princes, the right side of the flag is devoid of any insignia. However, the left portion of a princess' flag contains the usual hunting horn of Orange and a personal insignia (obtained from the coat of arms of the princess' family married into the royal family) in the upper and lower left quarters of the flag respectively.

Unlike the monarch's flag, the coat of arms is not surrounded by the insignia of the Grand Cross of the Military Order of William, but is placed either within an orange circle which replaces the centre of a blue cross, or at the centre of an orange cross.

Standard	Member of the Royal Family	Description
	Princess of the Netherlands (Daughters of Willem-Alexander); Catharina-Amalia, Alexia (from 2023) and Ariane (from 2025)	As princesses of the Netherlands, the daughters of King Willem-Alexander will use from their eighteenth birthday a swallowtailed flag, with the royal standard colours and their paternal arms (the horn of Orange) in the upper hoist and their maternal arms (the tower of Zorreguieta) in the lower hoist. The arms of the Netherlands without the insignia of the Order of Willem is within an orange circle.
	Princess Laurentien of the Netherlands (Wife of Prince Constantijn)	As princess, Laurentien uses a swallowtailed flag, with the colours of her husband's flag reversed (as spouse) and her husband's maternal arms (horn of Orange) in the upper hoist and a reference to her paternal descent (the lozenge from the Arms of Wognum in West-Friesland), in the lower hoist as difference. The arms of the Netherlands without the insignia of the Order of Willem is in the cross.
	Princess of the Netherlands (Daughters of Juliana); Beatrix, Irene, Margriet and Christina	As princesses of the Netherlands, the daughters of Queen Juliana use a swallowtailed flag, with the royal standard colours and their maternal arms (the horn of Orange) in the upper hoist and their paternal arms (the rose of Lippe) in the lower hoist. The arms of the Netherlands without the insignia of the Order of Willem is within an orange circle.
	Princess of the Netherlands (Daughter of Wilhelmina); Juliana of the Netherlands (before her reign and after her abdication) (1909–1948 / 1980–2004)	As princess, Juliana used a swallow tailed orange flag, divided in four quarters by a nassau-blue cross. In the centre of the flag is a small arm of the Netherlands without the insignia of the Order of Willem within an orange circle. In the upper hoist her maternal arms (the horn of Orange) and her paternal arms (a black bull with white horns, a red tongue and a golden crown, from the arms of Mecklenburg) in the lower hoist.
	Princess of the Netherlands (1908–1910)	The former standard for Princess Marie
	Princess of the Netherlands (1898–1908)	The former standard for Dutch princesses was a swallowtailed flag, with the colours of the historical royal standard with the royal coat of arms in an orange rectangle at the central band.

== Consorts ==
In general, the standard of a prince consort of the Netherlands is a rectangular flag with proportions 5:6 with the colours of the royal standard (i.e. the orange field and blue cross) reversed. The upper left and lower right quarters bear the lion from the Dutch coat of arms (holding arrows in one hand and brandishing a sword in the other) while the other two quarters have a personal figure taken from their personal coat of arms.

In general, the standard of a queen consort, or the wife of a prince of the Netherlands, is a flag in the form of a swallow tail. The two right quarters are empty, the upper left corner bears the orange horn taken from the arms of the Principality of Orange and the lower left quarter has a personal figure, taken from their personal coat of arms.

In both cases, the coat of arms of the kingdom is at the centre of the cross.

Standard	Person	Description	Family arms
	Máxima Zorreguieta (2002–present)	Máxima uses a square and swallow tailed flag, with the colours of her husband's flag reversed (as consort) and her husband's maternal arms (horn of Orange) in the upper hoist and a reference to her paternal descent (the tower of Zorreguieta), in the lower hoist as difference. The arms of the Netherlands (which originates from Nassau) without the insignia of the Order of Willem in the cross.	
	Claus von Amsberg (1966–2002)	A quadrangle in Nassau blue bearing an orange cross. First and third quarters, adorned by the Dutch Lion of the coat of arms of The Netherlands. Second and fourth quarters, adorned by the white castle tower from the coat of arms of the House of Amsberg. Centred upon the cross is the coat of arms of The Netherlands, topped by a royal crown.	
	Bernhard of Lippe-Biesterfeld (1937-2004)	A quadrangle bearing an orange cross. First and third quarters in Nassau blue, adorned by the Dutch Lion from the national coat of arms. Second and fourth quarters are white, adorned by the five-leafed rose with golden sepals from the coat of arms of the House of Lippe. Centred upon the cross is the coat of arms of The Netherlands, topped by a royal crown.	
	Henry of Mecklenburg-Schwerin (1908–1934)	A quadrangle bearing an orange cross. First and third quarters in Nassau blue, adorned by the Dutch Lion from the national coat of arms. The second and fourth quarters are Azure, adorned by a griffin passant Or langed Gules of the House of Mecklenburg. Centred upon the cross is the coat of arms of The Netherlands, topped by a royal crown.	
	Henry of Mecklenburg-Schwerin (1902–1908)	The Dutch flag with the coat of arms of the prince in the white band on the separation of the trousers and flight, above it a pennant split over one third of the length in the colours of the Dutch flag with the coat of arms of the prince in a white square on the pants. Prince.	
	Emma of Waldeck and Pyrmont (1908–1934)	She used a square and swallow tailed orange flag, divided in four quarters by a Nassau-blue cross. In the centre of the flag is a small arm of the Netherlands without the insignia of the Order of Willem within an orange circle. Each quarter shows a bugle-horn, which originates in arms of the principality of Orange.	
	Emma of Waldeck and Pyrmont (1898–1908)	The Dutch flag, angled on the flight side, with the Royal coat of arms (without the mantle) in the white stripe on the separation of the pants and flight, above it a pennant split over one third of the length in the colours of the Dutch flag with the pants in a white square the royal coat of arms.	

== See also ==
- List of flags of the Netherlands

== Sources ==
- Website: Dutch Royal House. English text about the standard
- Website: Dutch Royal House. Image of the standard in the Dutch language section.
- Website: Dutch Royal House. Standards of the Dutch Royal Family members in the Dutch language section.
- Website: Flags of the World
