= Monarchy of the Netherlands =

King of the Netherlands
- Koning der Nederlanden (Dutch); Rey di Hulanda (Papiamento)
- Coat of arms of the Netherlands

Incumbent
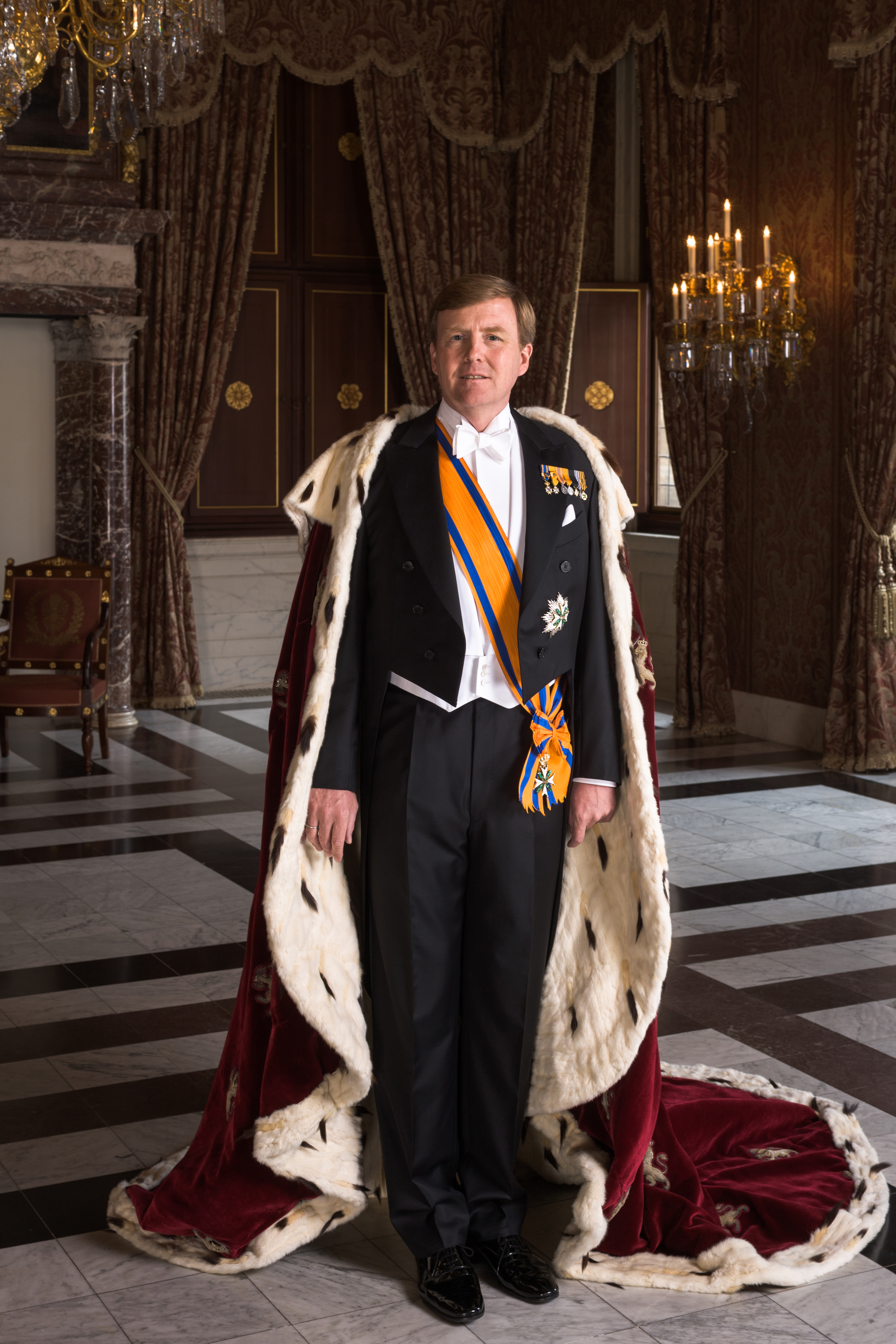
- Willem-Alexander since 30 April 2013

Details
- Style: His Majesty
- Heir apparent: Catharina-Amalia, Princess of Orange
- First monarch: William I
- Formed: 16 March 1815; 211 years ago
- Residences: Royal Palace of Amsterdam; Noordeinde Palace; Huis ten Bosch
- Website: royal-house.nl

The monarchy of the Netherlands is governed by the country's charter and constitution, roughly a third of which explains the mechanics of succession, accession, and abdication; the roles and duties of the monarch; the formalities of communication between the States General of the Netherlands; and the monarch's role in creating laws. The monarch is sovereign and head of state of the Kingdom of the Netherlands—comprising Aruba, Curaçao, the Netherlands, and Sint Maarten.

The once-sovereign provinces of the Spanish Netherlands were intermittently ruled by members of the House of Orange-Nassau from 1559, when Philip II of Spain appointed William the Silent (William of Orange) as stadtholder, until 1795, when the last stadtholder, William V, Prince of Orange, fled the country. William the Silent became the leader of the Dutch Revolt and of the independent Dutch Republic. Some of his descendants were later appointed as stadtholders by the provinces, and, in 1747, the role of stadtholder became a hereditary position in all provinces of the thus "crowned" Dutch Republic.

The Netherlands has been a hereditary monarchy since 20 November 1813, when it was constituted as a principality upon independence from Napoleonic France. It was raised to a kingdom on 16 March 1815. Willem-Alexander has been King of the Netherlands since 30 April 2013, following the abdication of his mother, Queen Beatrix.

== Succession ==
The monarchy of the Netherlands passes by right of succession to the heirs of William I from the House of Orange-Nassau. (Note: (in Dutch) Constitution for the Kingdom of the Netherlands Article 24 (Dutch edition of WikiSource)) The heir is determined through two mechanisms: absolute cognatic primogeniture and proximity of blood. The Netherlands established absolute cognatic primogeniture instead of male-preference primogeniture by law in 1983. Proximity of blood limits accession to the throne to a person who is related to the current monarch within three degrees of kinship. For example, the grandchildren of Princess Margriet (younger sister of Princess Beatrix) have no succession rights because their kinship with Beatrix when she was queen was of the fourth degree (that is, Princess Beatrix is their parent's parent's parent's daughter). Succession is limited to legitimate heirs, precluding a claim to the throne by children born out of wedlock. (Note: (in Dutch) Constitution for the Kingdom of the Netherlands Article 25 (Dutch edition of WikiSource)) If the king dies while his wife is pregnant, the unborn child is considered the heir at that point, unless stillborn – the child is then considered never to have existed. As such, if the preceding king dies while his wife is pregnant with their first child, the unborn child is immediately considered born and immediately becomes the new king or queen. If the pregnancy ends in stillbirth, his or her reign is expunged (otherwise the existence of the stillborn king/queen would add a degree of separation for other family members to the throne and might suddenly exclude the next person in line for the throne). (Note: (in Dutch) Constitution for the Kingdom of the Netherlands Article 26 (Dutch edition of WikiSource))

If the monarch is a minor, a regent is appointed and serves until the monarch comes of age. (Note: (in Dutch) Constitution for the Kingdom of the Netherlands Article 33 (Dutch edition of WikiSource)) (Note: (in Dutch) Constitution for the Kingdom of the Netherlands Article 37 (Dutch edition of WikiSource)) The regent is customarily the surviving parent of the monarch, but the constitution stipulates that custody and parental authority of the minor monarch will be determined by law; any person might be appointed as regent, as legal guardian or both. (Note: (in Dutch) Constitution for the Kingdom of the Netherlands Article 34 (Dutch edition of WikiSource))

There are also a number of special cases within the Constitution. First, if there is no heir when the monarch dies, the States-General may appoint a successor upon the suggestion of the government. This suggestion may be made before the death of the reigning monarch, even by the monarch himself (in case it is clear that the monarch will die without leaving an heir). (Note: (in Dutch) Constitution for the Kingdom of the Netherlands Article 30 (Dutch edition of WikiSource)) Second, some people are excluded from the line of succession. They are:

- Any heir who marries without the permission of the States-General loses the right of succession. (Note: (in Dutch) Constitution for the Kingdom of the Netherlands Article 28 (Dutch edition of WikiSource))
- A person who is or has become truly undesirable or unfit as monarch can be removed from the line of succession by an act of the States-General upon suggestion of the reigning monarch. (Note: (in Dutch) Constitution for the Kingdom of the Netherlands Article 29 (Dutch edition of WikiSource)) This clause has never been executed and is considered an "emergency exit". An example would be an heir apparent who commits treason or suffers an incapacitating accident.

=== Accession ===
As with most monarchies, the Netherlands cannot be without a monarch – the constitution of the Netherlands does not recognise a situation in which there is no monarch. This is because there must be a head of state in order for the government to function, as there must be someone who carries out the tasks of the constitutional role of the king or queen. For this reason, the new monarch assumes the role the moment the previous monarch ceases to hold the throne. The only exception is if there is no heir at all, in which case the Council of State assumes the role of the monarch pending the appointment of a monarch or regent. (Note: (in Dutch) Constitution for the Kingdom of the Netherlands Chapter 2: Government (Dutch edition of WikiSource))

The monarch is expected to execute his duties and responsibilities for the good of the nation. The monarch must therefore swear to uphold the constitution and execute the office faithfully. The monarch must be sworn in as soon as possible after assuming the throne during a joint session of the States-General held in Amsterdam. Article 32 of the Dutch constitution describes a swearing-in in "the capital, Amsterdam", which incidentally is the only phrase in the constitution that names Amsterdam as the capital of the Kingdom. (Note: (in Dutch) Constitution for the Kingdom of the Netherlands Article 32 (Dutch edition of WikiSource)) The ceremony is called the inauguration (inhuldiging).

The Dutch monarch is not crowned—although the crown, orb, and sceptre are present at the ceremony—and the monarch's swearing of the oath constitutes acceptance of the throne. This ceremony does not equal accession to the throne, as this would imply a vacancy of the throne between monarchs, which is not allowed. The monarch ascends immediately after the previous monarch ceases to reign. The swearing-in only constitutes acceptance in public.

=== End of a reign ===
The monarch's reign can end in death or abdication. Both of these events cause the regular mechanisms of succession to go into effect. (Note: (in Dutch) Constitution for the Kingdom of the Netherlands Article 27 (Dutch edition of WikiSource)) While the constitution mentions neither possibility explicitly, it does describe what happens after the monarch dies or abdicates. Abdication is a prerogative of the monarch, but it is also irreversible, as the person abdicating cannot return to the throne, nor can a child born to a former monarch after an abdication has occurred have a claim to the throne.

The abdicated monarch is legally a prince(ss) of the Netherlands, as well as a prince(ss) of Orange-Nassau. After their death, legally the deceased monarch (abdicated or not) has no titles. However, after death, the abdicated monarch is traditionally referred to as king or queen again. For example, Queen Juliana became queen on 4 September 1948 and princess again on 30 April 1980 following her abdication but has been referred to as Queen Juliana since her death on 20 March 2004.

=== Temporary loss of royal authority ===
There are two ways in which the monarch, without ceasing to be monarch, can be stripped of his or her royal authority:

Voluntary suspension of royal authority
The monarch temporarily ceases execution of his or her office.
Removal from royal authority
The government strips the monarch of his or her royal authority, as he or she is deemed unfit for their tasks.

These cases are both temporary (even if the monarch dies while not executing his office, it still counts as temporary) and are described in detail in the constitution. A monarch can temporarily cease to reign for any reason. This can be at his own request or because the Council of Ministers deems the monarch unfit for office. (Note: (in Dutch) Constitution for the Kingdom of the Netherlands Article 35 (Dutch edition of WikiSource)) (Note: (in Dutch) Constitution for the Kingdom of the Netherlands Article 36 (Dutch edition of WikiSource)) Although there can be any reason for the monarch to cede royal authority or be removed from it, both monarch and council are deemed to act responsibly and not leave the execution of the office vacant unnecessarily. Both cases are intended to deal with emergency situations such as physical or mental inability to execute the duties of the office of the monarch.

In both cases, an act of the joint States-General is needed to strip the monarch of authority. In the case of the monarch ceding royal authority, the required act is a law. In case of removal, it is a declaration by the States-General. Formally, both require the normal procedure for passing a new law in the Netherlands. The former case is signed into law by the monarch himself; the latter is not, so technically it is not a law (this is allowed explicitly in the Constitution since the monarch who is being stripped of his authority will probably not agree to sign the act of his removal and—in the case of the States-General removing a monarch who has become unfit due to mental or physical incapacitation—may not be able to).

Since neither ceding nor removal is permanent, neither triggers succession. Instead, the States-General appoint a regent. This must be the heir apparent if he or she is old enough. In order for the monarch to resume his duties, a law (which is signed by the regent) must be passed to that effect. The monarch resumes the throne the moment the law of his return is made public.

== The monarch and the government ==
Although the monarch has roles and duties in all parts of the government and in several important places in the rest of society, the primary role of the monarch is within the executive branch of the Dutch government: the monarch is part of the government of the Netherlands.

The role of the monarch within the government of the Netherlands is described in Article 42 of the constitution: (Note: (in Dutch) Constitution for the Kingdom of the Netherlands Article 42 (Dutch edition of WikiSource))

1. De regering wordt gevormd door de Koning en de ministers.
2. De Koning is onschendbaar; de ministers zijn verantwoordelijk.

Translation:

1. The government consists of the King and the ministers.
2. The King is inviolable; the ministers are responsible.

This article is the basis of the full power and influence of the monarch and makes him beyond reproach before the law but also limits his practical power, as he can take no responsibility for it.

The first paragraph of Article 42 determines that the government of the Netherlands consists of the monarch and his ministers. The monarch is, according to this article, not the head of government; the ministers are not answerable to the monarch within the government. (Note: (in Dutch) Constitution for the Kingdom of the Netherlands Article 46 (Dutch edition of WikiSource)) (Note: (in Dutch) Constitution for the Kingdom of the Netherlands Article 45 (Dutch edition of WikiSource)) There is no distinction, no dichotomy, no segregation or separation: the monarch and his ministers are the government, and the government is one.

This fact has practical consequences, in that it is not possible for the monarch and the ministers to be in disagreement. The government speaks with one voice and makes decisions as a united body. When the monarch acts in an executive capacity, he does so as a representative of the united government. And when the government decides, the monarch is in agreement (even if the monarch personally disagrees). As an ultimate consequence of this, it is not possible for the monarch to refuse to sign into law a proposal of law that has been agreed to and signed by the responsible minister. Such a disagreement between the monarch and his minister is a situation not covered by the constitution and is automatically a constitutional crisis.

The second paragraph of the article states that the monarch is inviolable. He is beyond any reproach, beyond the grasp of any prosecution (criminal or otherwise) for any acts committed or actions taken as monarch. If anything goes wrong, the minister responsible for the topic at hand is responsible for the failings of the monarch. This sounds like it makes the monarch an absolute tyrant, but in fact, the opposite is true. Actual decision-making lies with the ministers. The ministers set the course of the government and the country, and the ministers make executive decisions and run the affairs of the state. Since the government is one, the monarch abides by the decision of the ministers. In fact, in modern practice this paragraph effectively leaves the monarch without any actual political power. Dutch monarchs rarely make any executive decisions at all and practically never speak in public on any subject other than to read a statement prepared by the prime minister (since an unfortunate off-the-cuff remark could get a minister into trouble). The practical consequence of this limit on the power of the monarch is that the monarch never makes a decision on his own. Every decision and decree must be countersigned by the responsible minister(s), who then assumes political responsibility for the act.

== The monarch and the law of the land ==
Technically, the monarch holds significant formal power. For instance, no proposal of law becomes effective until it is signed by the monarch – while there is no legal requirement for the monarch to sign. (Note: (in Dutch) Constitution for the Kingdom of the Netherlands Article 87 (Dutch edition of WikiSource)) In practice, the monarch always gives assent since most proposals of law are put forward by the government "by or on behalf of the King". (Note: (in Dutch) Constitution for the Kingdom of the Netherlands Article 82 (Dutch edition of WikiSource)) Similarly, while proposals of law must be approved by the States-General, a lot of the practical running of the country is done by royal decree (in Dutch: Koninklijk Besluit). These royal decrees are used for all sorts of things, ranging from appointments of civil servants and military officers to clarifications of how public policy is to be executed to filling in the details of certain laws. Through royal decrees, ministries are created, (Note: (in Dutch) Constitution for the Kingdom of the Netherlands Article 44 (Dutch edition of WikiSource)) the houses of the States-General can be dissolved, (Note: (in Dutch) Constitution for the Kingdom of the Netherlands Article 64 (Dutch edition of WikiSource)) and ministers are appointed or dismissed. (Note: (in Dutch) Constitution for the Kingdom of the Netherlands Article 43 (Dutch edition of WikiSource))

However, royal decrees are made by the responsible minister. Although the monarch must formally sign both laws and decrees before they take effect, the constitution requires that the responsible minister or state secretary countersign them. (Note: (in Dutch) Constitution for the Kingdom of the Netherlands Article 47 (Dutch edition of WikiSource)) This arrangement ensures that, despite the monarch’s formal role, political accountability remains with the minister. In practice, the minister requests the monarch’s formal approval—signifying royal authority—and the monarch signs first as a guardian of the constitution, with the minister’s countersignature confirming responsibility on behalf of the Crown. While the monarch can technically propose laws "by or on behalf of the King", ministerial responsibility means that such proposals never actually originate from the monarch. Similarly, even though the government might theoretically refuse to sign a proposal approved by the States-General, such an event is extremely rare; the notion of the monarch independently withholding a signature would almost certainly trigger a constitutional crisis.

There is one special case in which the monarch has, if possible, even less power than normal: the appointment of his ministers. Ministers are appointed by royal decree, which has to be countersigned by the responsible minister. The royal decree to appoint a minister, however, is countersigned by two responsible ministers rather than one: the outgoing minister responsible for the ministry and the Prime Minister. (Note: (in Dutch) Constitution for the Kingdom of the Netherlands Article 48 (Dutch edition of WikiSource))

== Formation of the government ==
Though the powers of the monarch of the Netherlands are limited, he or she does not have a ceremonial role. The monarch has a role relating to the formation of a new government after parliamentary elections. This power is not directed by the constitution.

After the parliamentary election, there follows a period of time in which the leaders of the political parties in parliament seek to form a coalition of parties that can command a majority of the newly elected parliament. The current nationwide party-list system, combined with a low threshold for getting a seat (two-thirds of one per cent of the vote), makes it all but impossible for one party to win an outright majority. Thus, the bargaining required to put together a governing coalition is as important as the election itself.

This process of negotiations, which can last anywhere from two to four months (more on occasion), is coordinated in the initial stages by one or more informateurs, whose duty it is to investigate and report upon viable coalitions. After a likely combination is found, a formateur is appointed to conduct the formal coalition negotiations and form a new council of ministers (of which the formateur himself usually becomes the prime minister). If the negotiations fail, the cycle starts over. The informateurs and formateur in question are all appointed to this task by the monarch. The monarch makes his own decision in this, based on advice from the leaders of the different parties in parliament, as well as other important figures (the speakers of the new parliament and the senate are among them).

There is usually some popular discussion in the Netherlands around the time of these negotiations about whether the authority of the monarch in this matter should not be limited and whether or not the newly elected parliament should not make the appointments that the monarch makes. These discussions usually turn (to varying degrees) on the argument that a decision by a monarch is undemocratic and there is no parliamentary oversight over the decision, and the monarch might make use of this to push for a government of his or her liking.

On the other hand, it is somewhat questionable that the monarch really has much opportunity here to exert any influence. The informateur is there to investigate possible coalitions and report on them. He could technically seek "favourable" coalitions, but the political parties involved are usually quite clear on what they want and do not want, and the first choice for coalition almost always is the coalition of preference of the largest party in the new parliament. Besides, the monarchs and (particularly) the queens have traditionally known better than to appoint controversial informateurs, usually settling for well-established yet fairly neutral people in the political arena (the deputy chairman of the Dutch Council of State is a common choice). Once a potential coalition has been identified, the monarch technically has free rein in selecting a formateur. However, the formateur almost always becomes the next prime minister, and in any case, it is a strong convention that a government must command the support of a majority of the House of Representatives in order to stay in office. These considerations mean that the selected formateur is always the party leader of the largest party in the potential coalition.

However, in March 2012 the States-General altered its own procedures, such that any subsequent government formation is done without the monarch's influence. No more than a month later, the government coalition collapsed, triggering early elections in September 2012. As no formal procedures had been outlined as to how a government formation without a monarch should take place, it was initially feared the subsequent government formation would be chaotic. However, a new government coalition was formed within 54 days – surprisingly early for Dutch standards. Instead of the monarch, the Speaker of the House of Representatives appointed the informateur – whose function was renamed to 'scout'. After the negotiations, the installation ceremony of ministers – the only duty still left to the monarch – was held in public for the first time in history.

== The monarch and the States-General ==
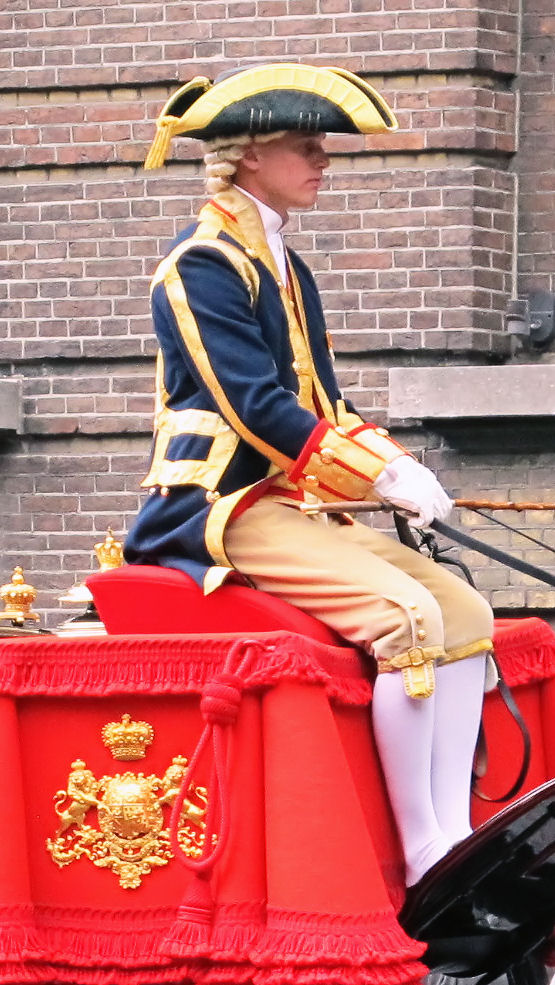
The Dutch Court is still known for their old traditions.

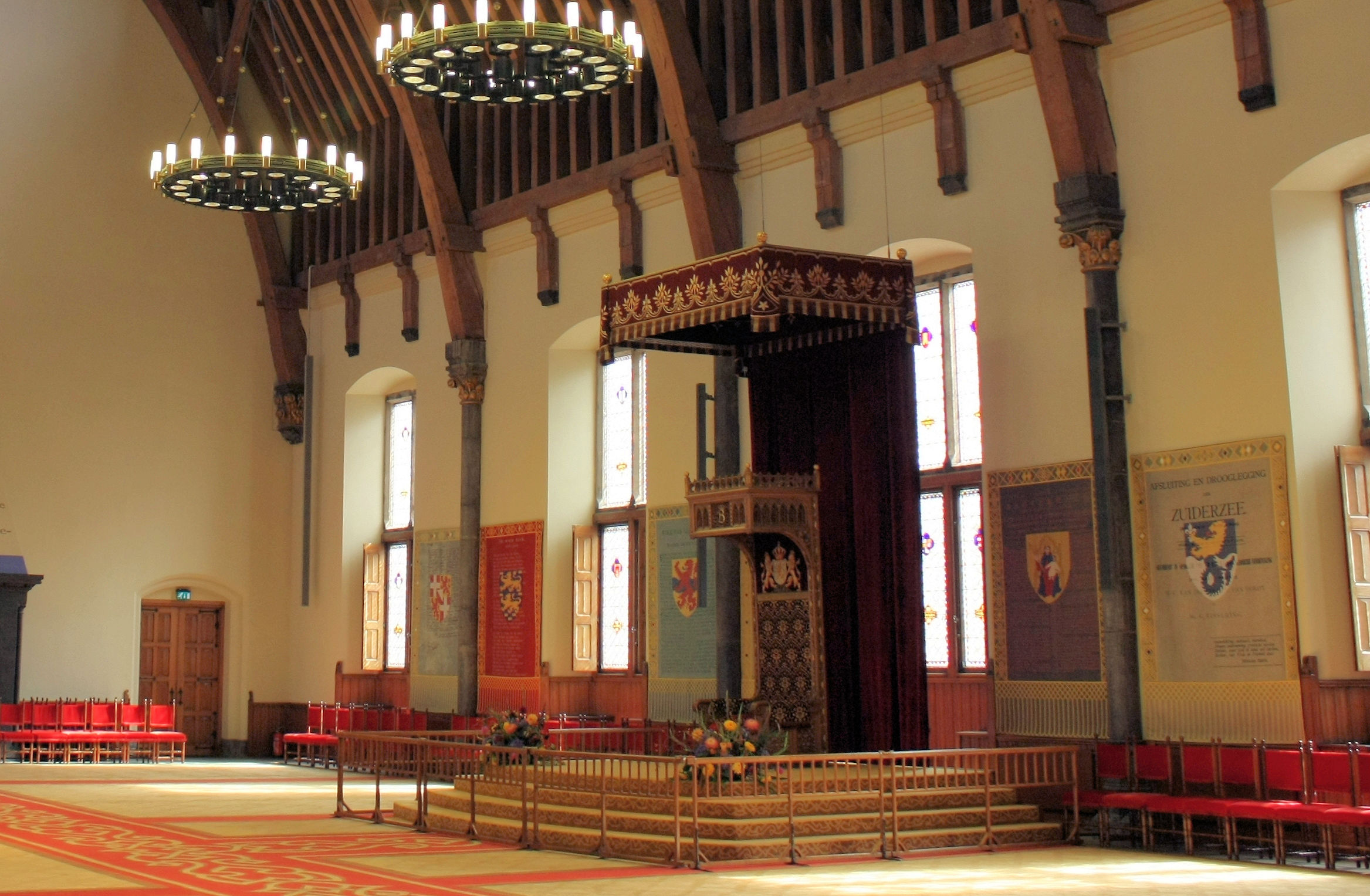
The throne of the Ridderzaal, from which the Dutch monarch delivers the Throne Speech on Prinsjesdag.

The one branch of government over which the monarch has no control is the legislative branch, formed by the States-General of the Netherlands. This parliamentary body consists of two chambers, the House of Representatives (also commonly referred to as Parliament) and the Senate. (Note: (in Dutch) Constitution for the Kingdom of the Netherlands Article 51 (Dutch edition of WikiSource))

As in most parliamentary democracies, the States-General are doubly responsible for overseeing the government in its executive duties as well as approving proposals of law before they can become such. In this respect, it is vital for the government to maintain good relations with the States-General and technically the monarch shares in that effort (although the monarch never officially speaks to members of the States-General on policy matters due to ministerial responsibility).

Constitutionally, the monarch deals with the States-General in three areas: lawmaking, policy outlining at the opening of the parliamentary year and dissolution.

Of the three, policy outlining is the most straightforward. The parliamentary year is opened on the third Tuesday of September with a joint session of both houses. (Note: (in Dutch) Constitution for the Kingdom of the Netherlands Article 65 (Dutch edition of WikiSource)) At this occasion the monarch addresses the joint states in a speech in which he sets forth the outlines for his government's policies for the coming year (the speech itself is prepared by the ministers and their ministries and finally crafted and approved by the prime minister). This event is mandated by the constitution in Article 65. Tradition has made more of this occasion than a policy speech, though, and the event known as Prinsjesdag has become a large affair with much pomp and circumstance, in which the States-General and other major bodies of government assemble in the Ridderzaal to hear the King deliver the speech from the throne after having arrived from the Noordeinde Palace in his golden carriage. Both in constitutional aspects and in ceremony, the event has much in common with both the British State Opening of Parliament and the American State of the Union.

Lawmaking is the area in which the monarch has the most frequent involvement with the States-General (although he still has very little to do with it in practice). Laws in the Netherlands are primarily proposed by the government "by or on behalf of" the monarch (this phrase is repeated often in the constitution). Technically, this means that the monarch may propose laws in person, hearkening back to the days of the first monarchs of the Netherlands when monarchs really could and did control this. However, this possibility is at odds with ministerial responsibility, and modern monarchs have always avoided the issue by never proposing laws personally. The monarch must still sign proposals into law, though, as a historical deference to the fact that the law of the land is decreed by the monarch.

While the king has no practical involvement anymore in lawmaking other than a signature at the end, one might get a different impression from reading the communications between the government and the States-General regarding such affairs. All communication from the States-General to the government is addressed to the monarch, and correspondence in the opposite direction is formally from the monarch (it is also signed by the monarch, without a ministerial countersignature – such communication is not a decision or decree, so it does not require a countersignature). The formal language still shows deference to the position of the monarch, with a refusal of the States-General to approve a proposal of law, for example, becoming "a request to the King to reconsider the proposal". The constitution prescribes a number of the forms used: (Note: (in Dutch) Constitution for the Kingdom of the Netherlands Article XIX (Dutch edition of WikiSource))

- If the government accepts a proposal of law and signs it into law, the language is that "The King accedes to the proposal."
- If the government refuses a proposal of law, the language is that "The King shall keep the proposal under advisement."

A law, once passed, is formulated in such a way as to be decreed by the monarch.

The final involvement of the monarch with the States is dissolution. Constitutionally, the government is empowered to dissolve either house of the states by royal decree. This means that a minister (usually the prime minister) makes the decision and the monarch countersigns. The signing of such a royal decree constitutionally implies new elections for the house in question and the formation of a new house within three months of dissolution.

The constitution prescribes a number of cases in which one or more houses of the States are dissolved (particularly for changes to the constitution); this is always done by royal decree. In addition, traditionally a collapse of the government is followed by dissolution of the House of Representatives and general elections. Before World War II, before it became common to form new governments with each new parliament, it would happen from time to time that a council of ministers found itself suddenly facing a new and unfriendly parliament. When the inevitable clash came, it was an established political trick for the Prime Minister to attempt to resolve the problem by dissolving the parliament in the name of the monarch in the hope that new elections would bring a more favourable parliament (but it was also possible for the trick to backfire, in which case the new, equally hostile and far more angry parliament would suspend the budget to force the resignation of the government).

Even though the monarch never speaks with members of the States-General formally, it was tradition until 1999 that the queen would invite the members of parliament a few times a year for informal talks about the general state of affairs in the country. These conversations were held in the strictest confidence due to ministerial responsibility. The tradition was suspended in 1999, though, after repeated incidents in which MPs divulged the contents of the conversations, despite agreeing not to (and embarrassing the Prime Minister in doing so). In 2009, an attempt was made to resume the tradition; however, this failed when Arend Jan Boekestijn disclosed to the press contents of a private conversation he had with the Queen. Boekestijn resigned shortly after being exposed as the source.

== Other functions of the monarch ==
The monarch has several functions in addition to the duties and responsibilities described in previous sections. Some of these are (partly) constitutional; others are more traditional in nature.

The monarch is the head of state of the Kingdom of the Netherlands. As such, the monarch is the face of the kingdom toward the world: ambassadors of the Netherlands are emissaries of the monarch, foreign ambassadors represent foreign heads of state to the monarch. It is the monarch that makes official state visits to foreign heads of state as representative of the Netherlands. He or She represents the monarch whose face is shown on Dutch stamps and euro coins.

Constitutionally, the monarch is the head of the Dutch Council of State. (Note: (in Dutch) Constitution for the Kingdom of the Netherlands Article 74 (Dutch edition of WikiSource)) The council is a constitutional body of the Netherlands that serves two purposes. First, it is an advisory council to the government which advises on the desirability, practicability and constitutionality of new proposals of law.

Second, it is the Supreme court for the Netherlands in matters of administrative law. (Note: (in Dutch) Constitution for the Kingdom of the Netherlands Article 73 (Dutch edition of WikiSource)) The position of the monarch as constitutional head of this Council means two things for the constitutional position of the monarch:

1. The monarch is constitutionally and directly involved with practically all aspects of lawmaking except approval by the States-General (which is representative of the electorate). From inception of the law through proposal to the States to finally signing into law, the monarch is involved. This involvement is derived from the days when the monarch was an absolute ruler and really made law. Originally, with the creation of the first constitutions, the monarchs strove to maintain power by maximum involvement with all aspects of lawmaking. Over time this has grown into a more advisory role.
2. The monarch is constitutionally involved with at least part of the judicial branch of government as well.

The role played by the monarch in the council is largely theoretical due to ministerial responsibility. While the monarch is officially chairman of the council, in practice the king never votes in Council meetings and always turns over his responsibility as chair of the meetings to the deputy head of the council. He is still presumed to be part of the discussions, though.

Despite the limitations on the role the monarch may play in the council, his involvement is seen as valuable due to the experience and knowledge that a monarch accrues over the years. Reciprocally, being part of the Council deliberations is considered invaluable training and preparation for the role of monarch, which is why the heir-apparent is constitutionally an observer-member of the council from the time he comes of age.

The monarch is also the Grand Master of the Dutch orders of knighthoods: the Order of Orange-Nassau, (Note: (in Dutch) Wet instelling van de Orde van Oranje-Nassau, law regarding the Order of Orange-Nassau, Article 3) the Order of the Netherlands Lion (Note: (in Dutch) Wet instelling van de Orde van de Nederlandse Leeuw, law regarding the Order of the Dutch Lion, Article 3, par. 1) and the Military William Order. (Note: (in Dutch) Wet instelling Militaire Willems-Orde, law regarding the Military William Order, Article 3)

Lastly, the monarch plays a prominent but equally unofficial role in the running of the country as an adviser and confidant to the government. This duty traditionally takes the form of a weekly meeting between the Prime Minister and the monarch in which they discuss government affairs of the week, the plans of the cabinet, and so on. It is assumed that the monarch exerts most of his influence (such as it is) in these meetings, in that he can bring his knowledge and experience to bear on what he tells the Prime Minister. In the case of Queen Beatrix, several former Prime Ministers have remarked that her case knowledge of each and every dossier is extensive and that she makes sure to be fully aware of all the details surrounding everything that arrives on her desk.

Perhaps somewhat surprisingly for a monarchy, the monarch is not the commander-in-chief of the military of the Netherlands (not even nominally). He was until 1983, but a large overhaul of the constitution that year shifted supreme command of the armed forces to the government as a whole. (Note: (in Dutch) Constitution for the Kingdom of the Netherlands Article 97 (Dutch edition of WikiSource)) In contrast to most monarchies, this required Willem-Alexander to resign from his (brigadier general level) ranks in all military branches when he ascended the throne. At that occasion the special Royal distinctive was created that the King could wear on his uniforms to show his lasting relation with the armed forces. This is however no formal rank.

=== Remuneration and privileges ===
==== Stipend ====
Article 40 of the constitution states that the monarch is to receive an annual stipend from the kingdom (in other words wages, except that it cannot be called that since it implies the monarch is employed by the government, but rather it is the opposite). The exact rules surrounding these stipends are to be determined by law, as is the list of members of the royal house who also receive them. (Note: (in Dutch) Constitution for the Kingdom of the Netherlands Article 40 (Dutch edition of WikiSource))

Under current Dutch law the monarch receives their annual stipend which is part of the annual budget, as do the heir-apparent (if of age), the spouse of the monarch, the spouse of the heir-apparent, the former monarch, and the spouse of the former monarch. (Note: (in Dutch) Wet financieel statuut van het Koninklijk Huis Law on the financial statute of the royal house) In practice, as of June 2019, this means King Willem-Alexander, Queen Maxima, and Princess Beatrix. The monarch receives this stipend constitutionally, the others because they are not allowed to work for anybody due to their positions. For example, the recipients of royal stipends in 2009 were Queen Beatrix (€813,000), Prince Willem-Alexander (the heir-apparent; €241,000) and Princess Máxima (€241,000)). (Note: Vaststelling begroting Huis der Koningin (I) voor het jaar 2009 31700 I 2 Memorie van toelichting Argumentation for the law setting the royal house budget for the year 2009) For 2017 the stipends were; for the King €888,000, for the Queen €352,000, and for Princess Beatrix €502,000. These personal stipends are in addition to an allowance for each of those named to meet official expenditure, these were set at €4.6 million for the King, €606,000 for the Queen and just over €1 million for Princess Beatrix.

This stipend is linked to the development of the wages of Dutch civil servants. At the beginning of 2009 there was some upset in the parliament about the cost of the royal house and the lack of insight into the structure of those costs. At the insistence of the parliament the development of the stipends of the royal house members was then linked to the development of the salaries of the Dutch civil servants. During 2009 it was agreed collectively that the civil servants would receive a pay increase of 1%. In September 2009, at the first budget debate in parliament during the economic crisis, it was pointed out to the parliament that their earlier decision meant that the stipend to the queen would now also increase. This in turn was reason for the parliament to be displeased again.

==== Royal privileges ====
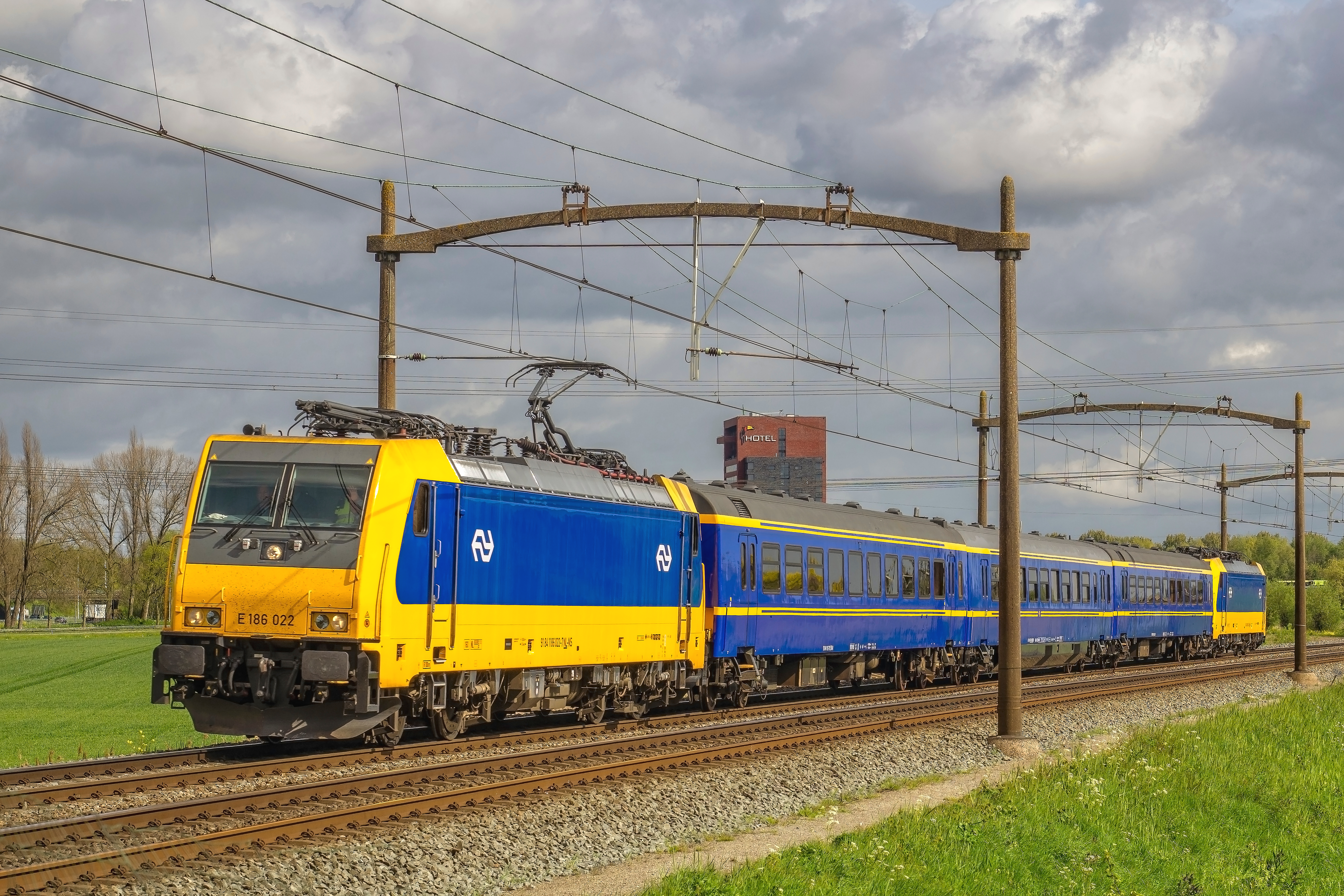
The Dutch monarchy's royal train in 2017

===== Taxation =====
Under the constitution, royal house members receiving a stipend are exempt from income tax over that stipend. They are also exempt from all personal taxes over assets and possessions that they use or need in the execution of their functions for the kingdom. The monarch and the heir-apparent are exempt from inheritance tax on inheritances received from members of the royal house.

===== Palaces =====
The monarch has the use of Huis ten Bosch and Noordeinde Palace in The Hague, as a residence and work palace, respectively. The Royal Palace of Amsterdam is also at the disposal of the monarch (although it is only used for state visits and is open to the public when not in use for that purpose).

===== Transportation =====
In addition to a small fleet of cars (on which the Royal Standard may be displayed), the monarch has a private three-car royal train. For train journeys, the monarch has access to royal waiting rooms at three train stations: Den Haag HS railway station, Amsterdam Centraal station, and Baarn railway station. The monarch also has access to a Boeing 737 Business Jet available to the Dutch government as a whole, which King Willem-Alexander is licensed to fly.

===== Lèse-majesté =====
Historically the Dutch monarch was protected by law against lèse-majesté. The Netherlands was amongst the last remaining monarchies in Europe to actively prosecute citizens for publicly insulting the reigning sovereign or members of their immediate family, although the sentences tend to be light. According to Dutch TV, in total 18 prosecutions were brought under the law between 2000 and 2012, half of which resulted in convictions. Lèse-majesty in the Netherlands was formally abolished as of 1 January 2020. However, insulting the Monarch, the Royal Consort, the heir apparent or their consort, or the Regent, is still punishable on the same level as denigrating public officials acting in their official capacity, punishable by up to three months in prison and/or a fine.

=== Positions of other members of the royal house and royal family ===
The royal family has become quite extensive since the birth of Queen Juliana's children. By consequence so has the Dutch royal house (nominally the collection of persons in line for the throne and their spouses), to the extent that membership of the royal house was limited by a change in the law in 2002. (Note: (in Dutch) Wet lidmaatschap koninklijk huis Law on membership and titles of the Dutch royal house)

Despite being a large clan, the family as a whole has very little to do officially with Dutch government or the running of the Netherlands. Constitutionally, an important role is played by the monarch. The heir-apparent is deemed to be preparing for an eventual ascent to the throne, so there are some limited tasks and a number of limits on them (particularly he/she cannot hold a paying job, since this might lead to entanglements later on). Since neither the monarch nor the heir-apparent may hold jobs, they receive a stipend from the government. Their spouses are similarly forbidden from earning an income and receive a stipend as well. But constitutionally that is the whole of the involvement of the royal family with the Dutch government.

In particular, members of the royal house other than the monarch and the heir-apparent have no official tasks within the Dutch government and do not receive stipends. They are responsible for their own conduct and their own income. They may be asked to stand in from time to time such as to accompany the monarch on a state visit if the consort is ill, but this is always a personal favour and not an official duty. In addition, they are not exempt from taxation.

Many members of the royal family hold (or have held) significant positions within civil society, usually functioning as head or spokesperson of one or more charitable organizations, patron of the arts and similar endeavours. Some members of the royal family are also (or have been) avid supporters of some personal cause; Prince Bernhard for instance was always passionate about the treatment of World War II veterans and Princess Margriet (who was born in Canada) has a special relationship with Canadian veterans specifically. As a rule of thumb, the members of the royal family who are contemporaries of Princess Beatrix tend to hold civil society positions as a primary occupation whereas younger family members hold these positions in conjunction with a regular, paying job. A notable exception to this rule is Pieter van Vollenhoven (husband to Princess Margriet), who was chairman of the Dutch Safety Board until his retirement.

As noted earlier, the spouses of the monarch and the heir-apparent are forbidden from holding paying jobs or government responsibilities. This is to prevent any monetary entanglements or undue influences involving the current and future monarchs. These legal limits were not a great problem when they were instituted in the 19th century; The Netherlands had kings and it was considered normal for a married woman to tend the household, raise the family and not to hold any position outside the home. The limits have been more problematic since the early 20th century, when the monarchy of the Netherlands passed to a series of queens and the consorts became men, starting with Prince Hendrik in 1901. The male consorts since then have all either been raised with an expectation of government responsibility (such as Prince Hendrik), or had established careers of their own before marrying the future queen (Prince Bernhard and Prince Claus). Upon marrying into the Dutch royal family they all found themselves severely restricted in their freedom to act and make use of their abilities. All of the male consorts have been involved in some form of difficulty or another (scandals involving infidelity and finances in the cases of Hendrik and Bernhard, deep depression in the case of Claus) and it has been widely speculated (and even generally accepted) that sheer boredom played at least a part in all of these difficulties.

Over time the restrictions on royal consorts have eased somewhat. Prince Hendrik was allowed no part or role in the Netherlands whatsoever. Due to his war efforts, Prince Bernhard was made Inspector General of the Dutch armed forces (although that role was created for him) and was an unofficial ambassador for the Netherlands who leveraged his wartime contacts to help Dutch industry. All that came to a halt in 1976, however, after the Lockheed bribery scandals. Prince Claus was allowed more leeway still after having established himself in Dutch society (he was unpopular at first, being a German marrying into the royal family after World War II); he was eventually given an advisorship within the Ministry for Development Cooperation pertaining to Africa, where he made good use of his experiences as a German diplomat in that continent. Nevertheless, neither Bernhard nor Claus ever fully got over the restrictive nature of their marriages and at the time of the royal wedding in 2002 it was broadly agreed in government circles that Queen Máxima (who had a career in banking before marrying King Willem-Alexander) should be allowed far more leeway if she desires.

==== Deceased members of the Dutch royal family since William I ====
- Prince Ernest Casimir of the Netherlands (son of William II, died in 1822);
- Prince Frederik Nicholaas of the Netherlands (grandson of William I, died in 1834);
- Queen Wilhelmine (first wife of William I, died in 1837);
- King William I, Count of Nassau (died in 1843);
- Prince Willem Frederik of the Netherlands (grandson of William I, died in 1846);
- Prince Alexander of the Netherlands (son of William II, died in 1848);
- King William II (son of William I, died in 1849);
- Prince Maurice of the Netherlands (son of William III, died in 1850);
- Henrietta, Countess of Nassau (widow of William I, died in 1864);
- Queen Dowager Anna (widow of William II, died in 1865);
- Louise, Princess Frederick of the Netherlands (wife of Prince Frederick, son of William I, died in 1870);
- Queen Louise of Sweden and Norway (granddaughter of William I, died in 1871);
- Amalia, Princess Henry of the Netherlands (first wife of Prince Henry, son of William II, died in 1872);
- King Charles XV of Sweden and IV of Norway (widower of Princess Louise, granddaughter of William I, died in 1872)
- Prince Albert of Prussia (husband of Princess Mariane, daughter of William I, died in 1872);
- Queen Sophie (first wife of William III, died in 1877);
- Prince Henry of the Netherlands (1820–1879) (son of William II, died in 1879);
- William, Prince of Orange (son of William III, died in 1879);
- Prince Frederick of the Netherlands (son of William I, died in 1881);
- Marianne, Princess Albert of Prussia (daughter of William I, died in 1883);
- Alexander, Prince of Orange (son of William III, died in 1884);
- Marie, Princess Henry of the Netherlands (widow of Prince Henry, son of William II, died in 1888);
- King William III (son of William II, died in 1890);
- Sophie, Grand Duchess of Saxe-Weimar-Eisenach (daughter of William II, died in 1897);
- Charles Alexander, Grand Duke of Saxe-Weimar-Eisenach (widower of Princess Sophie, daughter of William II, died in 1901);
- William, Prince of Wied (husband of Princess Marie, granddaughter of William I, died in 1907)
- Marie, Dowager Princess of Wied (granddaughter of William I, died in 1910);
- Queen Mother Emma (widow of William III, died in 1934);
- Prince Consort Henry (husband of Wilhelmina, died in 1934);
- Queen Wilhelmina (daughter of William III, died in 1962);
- Prince Consort Claus (husband of Beatrix, died in 2002);
- Queen Juliana (daughter of Wilhelmina, died in 2004);
- Prince Consort Bernhard (widower of Juliana, died in 2004);
- Prince Friso of Orange-Nassau (son of Beatrix, died in 2013);
- Princess Christina of the Netherlands (daughter of Juliana, died in 2019);

==== Death and burial ====
Although Dutch lawmakers have historically favoured being very conservative about creating a special legal position for members of the royal house or the royal family, there is one area in which the rules for members of the royal house are very different from those for other Dutch citizens: the area of death and burial.

For Dutch citizens, the rules surrounding death and burial are laid out by the Funeral Services Law (Dutch: Wet op de Lijkbezorging). However, article 87 of this law states the rule doesn't apply to the royal family. The Minister of Internal Affairs can also waive the law for other relatives of the monarch. The reason for this is that the exceptional position of members of the royal house is traditional.

Ever since the burial of William the Silent in the Nieuwe Kerk in Delft, members of the Orange-Nassau family have favoured burial in the same crypt as William. Some members of the family buried elsewhere were even moved there later. However, for health and hygiene reasons, burial in churches was forbidden in the Netherlands by decree of William I in 1829. To allow members of the royal family to be entombed, all Dutch laws on burial have made an exception for the royal house ever since the 1829 decree. The practice was banned before under French occupation but returned after 1815.

The burial of the royal house members is a matter of tradition, circumstance, practicality, and spirit of the times. This is due to the lack of any formal rules whatsoever. The body of a departed member of the royal house is typically placed on display for a few days in one of the palaces to allow the family to say goodbye. Depending on the deceased family member's identity (a monarch, for instance), there may also be a viewing for the public. Then, on the burial day, the body is transported to Delft in a special horse-drawn carriage. The current protocol specifies eight horses for a deceased monarch and six for a dead royal consort, which is relatively new since Prince Hendrik was borne to Delft by eight horses. The current carriage is purple with white trim. This also changed since the burial of Queen Wilhelmina in 1962, when the carriage was white. An exception was made for the funeral of Prince Bernhard. Given his military background, his coffin was carried to Delft on a gun carriage. Currently, members of the Dutch armed forces line the route to Delft, which is also new since the burial of Prince Hendrik, which was a quiet affair.

Once in Delft, the body is placed in the family crypt after a short service. Only members of the family are allowed in the crypt through the main entrance in the church, which only opens for royal funerals (the mayor of Delft has a key to a separate service entrance, which is only allowed to open in the presence of two military police officers and two members of the Dutch General Intelligence and Security Service for maintenance).

== The monarchy in Dutch society ==
=== Importance and position within Dutch society ===
The importance and position of the monarchy within Dutch society has changed over time, together with changes in the constitutional position of the monarchy.

The monarchy of the Netherlands was established in 1815 as a reaction to the decline and eventual fall of the Dutch Republic. It was observed at the time that a large part of the decline of the republic was due to a lack of a strong, central government in the face of strong, centrally led competitor nations such as Great Britain and the French kingdom. After the defeat of Napoleon Bonaparte in 1813 and the resurrection of the Netherlands, it was decided to reform the republic in the Kingdom of the Netherlands with a monarchy rather than the old stadtholder system.

Originally, the king was a near-autocrat. Ministers were responsible solely to him, with the States-General serving as more of an advisory board without the power to do much against the king. This state of affairs allowed the king great freedom to determine the course of the nation and indeed William I was able to push through many changes that set the nation on the course towards industrialization and wealth. He also established the first Dutch railway system and the Nederlandsche Handel Maatschappij, which would later evolve into the ABN Amro bank. On the other hand, his policies caused great discord with the Southern Netherlands, leading to the Belgian Revolution and a years-long war. A backlash against these policies plus rising fear of early Marxism led to acceptance by William II of a series of reforms, starting with a new constitution in 1848 (which was the start of a continuing series of limitations on royal power).

Direct political power and influence of the king continued until 1890, although it slowly declined in the meantime. Both William I and William II proved quite conservative rulers (although William II was less inclined to interfere with policy than his father was), William I resisted major reforms until eventually conflict with the States-General and his own government forced his abdication. William III's reign was a continuous saga of power struggles between the monarch and the parliamentary government (which he forced out a couple of times), plus major international crises due to the same stubbornness (including the Luxembourg Crisis). As a result, the Dutch government used the succession of William III by a female regent as an opportunity to make a power play and establish government authority over royal authority.

Queen Wilhelmina, who succeeded her father upon his death, was not happy with the new situation and made several half-hearted attempts during her reign to reassert authority. She was partly successful in certain areas (being able to push for military rearmament before World War I) but she never succeeded in restoring royal power and bowed fully to the principles of parliamentary democracy. She did introduce a new concept to Dutch royalty though: the popular monarch. Establishing her popularity in military circles through her support of Dutch military prior to 1917, she was able to wield her personal popularity to uphold the government against a socialist revolution in November 1918.

Royal power continued to decline until the start of World War II. Forced to flee to London, Queen Wilhelmina established the position of "mother of the Dutch state" through her radio broadcasts into the occupied Netherlands and her support for other Dutchmen evading the Germans and fighting from England. She tried to position her family into more influence by giving Prince Bernhard an important position in the military, but was still relegated to a position of constitutional monarch after the war.

Following Wilhelmina's abdication in 1948, the Orange-Nassau dynasty seems to have settled for a position of unofficial influence behind the scenes coupled with a role as "popular monarchs" in public. As such the monarchs are practically never seen in public doing their official work (except news footage of state visits and the reading of the government plans on Prinsjesdag) and instead their relationship with the public has become more of a popular and romanticized notion of royalty. Wilhelmina's daughter Juliana and granddaughter Beatrix were popularly perceived to have a figurehead role, serving to some extent as "mother of the nation" in times of crises and disasters (such as the 1953 floods). In addition, there is a public holiday called Koningsdag (King's Day, which was Koninginnedag, Queen's Day, before 2014), during which the royal family pays a visit somewhere in the country and participates in local activities and traditions in order to get closer to the people.

=== Popularity of the monarchy ===
The popularity of the monarchy has changed over time, with constitutional influence, circumstance and economic tides.

When the monarchy was established in 1815, popularity was not a major concern. Still, the Orange family held popular support in around 60% of the population following the fall of the French. This changed drastically over the following years as William I's policies alienated the Southern Netherlands, drew the country into civil war and established industries that favoured the rich Protestants and not the general populace.

Royal popularity remained relatively low throughout the reign of the kings. William II was conservative, but on the whole did as little to lose popularity as he did to gain it. Economic decline drove most of his popular decline, although popular support for the monarch was still not considered of much import then. William III was unpopular under a wide section of the public.

Royal popularity started to increase with Wilhelmina's ascent to the throne. She pushed for national reforms, was a huge supporter of the armed forces and strove for renewed industrialization. Around 1917 the country was generally divided into two camps: socialists in the cities, royalists elsewhere. This showed in the dividing lines during the failed Troelstra revolution, where Troelstra gained popular support in the larger cities but the countryside flocked to the queen. Wilhelmina was able to muster popular support with a countryside "publicity tour" together with her daughter – this showing of popular support for the queen was instrumental in halting the revolution and stabilizing the government. Still, Wilhelmina remained deeply unpopular in the cities throughout the 1920s and 1930s.

Nationwide support came for Wilhelmina and the monarchy during World War II. Wilhelmina was forced to retreat to London, but refused evacuation all the way to Canada (although princess Juliana was sent there with her children). Wilhelmina regularly held radio broadcasts into the occupied Netherlands and staunchly supported the Dutch troops in exile. She became the symbol for Dutch resistance against the Germans.

== History ==
After Dutch independence, the seven provinces of the Netherlands were each led by chief-executives called stadtholders. After 1747, the office of stadtholder was centralized (one stadtholder for all provinces) and became formally inherited by the House of Orange-Nassau through primogeniture. The Netherlands remained de jure a confederated republic until the Batavian Revolution of 1795.

The House of Orange-Nassau came from Dietz, Germany, seat of one of the Nassau counties. Their title 'Prince of Orange' was acquired through inheritance of the Principality of Orange in southern France, in 1544. William of Orange (also known as William the Silent) was the first Orange-Nassau stadtholder (ironically, appointed by Philip II of Spain). From 1568 to his death in 1584, he led the Dutch struggle for independence from Spain. His younger brother, John VI, Count of Nassau-Dillenburg, Stadtholder of Utrecht, was the direct male line ancestor of the later Stadtholders of Friesland and Groningen, the hereditary stadtholders of all the Netherlands and the first king of the Netherlands.

The present monarchy was founded in 1813, when the French were driven out. The new regime was headed by Prince William Frederick of Orange, the son of the last stadtholder. He originally reigned over only the territory of the previous republic as "sovereign prince". In 1815, after Napoleon escaped from Elba, William Frederick raised the Netherlands to the status of a kingdom and proclaimed himself King William I. As part of the rearrangement of Europe at the Congress of Vienna, the House of Orange-Nassau was confirmed as rulers of the Kingdom of the Netherlands, enlarged with what are now Belgium and Luxembourg. At the same time, William became hereditary Grand Duke of Luxembourg in exchange for ceding his family's hereditary lands in Germany to Nassau-Weilburg and Prussia. The Grand Duchy of Luxembourg was a part of the Netherlands (until 1839) while at the same time a member state of the German Confederation. It became fully independent in 1839, but remained in a personal union with the Kingdom of the Netherlands until 1890.

Abdication of the throne has become a de facto tradition in the Dutch monarchy. Queen Wilhelmina and Queen Juliana both abdicated in favour of their daughters and William I abdicated in favour of his eldest son, William II. The only Dutch monarchs to die on the throne were William II and William III.

On 30 April 2013 Queen Beatrix, abdicated in favour of Willem-Alexander.

== Religious affiliation ==
The Dutch Royal Family historically have been members of the Dutch Reformed Church. It became the Protestant Church in the Netherlands after its 2004 merger, but some members of the royal family are Roman Catholic. There is no law in the Netherlands stipulating what religion the monarch should be, although the constitution stipulated up to 1983 that marriage to a Catholic meant loss of rights to the throne (the constitutional overhaul of 1983 changed this to a requirement that potential heirs must seek parliamentary approval before marriage in order to retain rights of succession).

== Royal finances ==
The royal palaces are the property of the Dutch state and given for the use of the reigning monarch; While the House of Orange-Nassau possesses a large number of personal belongings, items such as paintings, historical artifacts and jewelry are usually associated with the performance of royal duties and/or the decoration of royal residences. As such, these items have a cultural significance beyond that of simple artworks and jewelry, and have therefore been placed in the hands of trusts: the House of Orange-Nassau Archives Trust and the House of Orange-Nassau Historic Collections Trust. Part of the collection is on permanent loan to Het Loo Palace Museum in Apeldoorn and the Rijksmuseum in Amsterdam. Queen Juliana sold the remaining royal palaces and put the cultural assets (paintings, antiques, books, etc.) into non-personal trusts.

The crown jewels, comprising the crown, orb and sceptre, Sword of State, royal banner, and ermine mantle have been placed in the Crown Property Trust. The trust also holds the items used on ceremonial occasions, such as the carriages, table silver, and dinner services. Placing these goods in the hands of a trust ensures that they will remain at the disposal of the monarch in perpetuity. The Royal Archives house the personal archives of the royal family. This includes books, photographs, and artworks, as well as the books of the House of Orange-Nassau and the music library. The library was begun in 1813, following the return of the Orange-Nassaus to the Netherlands. King William I allowed the Stadtholder's library to remain part of the Royal Library in The Hague. The library houses a collection of some 70,000 books, journals and brochures. The music library has 6,000 scores, going back to the mid 18th century.

The Royal House Finances Act (1972) as amended in 2008 sets allowances for the King (or Queen Regnant), the Heir to the Throne, and the former sovereign who has abdicated. Provision is also made for their spouses (and in the case of death, for the surviving spouse). The allowances have two components: income (A-component) and personnel and materials (B-component). Annual increases or decreases are provided for: the A component is linked to changes in the annual salary of the Vice-President of the Council of State; the B-component is linked to changes in civil service pay and the cost of living.

In 2009, the government decided that the annual state budget of the Netherlands should show in a transparent way all the costs of the royal house, some of which had previously been borne by various Government Ministries. Three sets of costs are now separately allocated in the annual budget for the royal house (Budget I of the annual State Budget). These are:

- Allowances paid under the Royal House Finances Act. They comprise the income and personnel and materials components mentioned above.
- Expenses incurred in the performance of official duties. They include costs which had previously been borne by the budgets of three Government Ministries (Interior, Transport and Water Management, Health and Welfare) and which are now attributed to the Royal budget in the interest of transparency. They also include the costs relating to royal flights and the royal yacht, Groene Draeck.
- Other expenses relating to the management of the royal house. They relate to expenses for the Government Information Service (AZ/RVD) in connection with the royal house, the cost of the Royal Military Household, the Queen's Cabinet and the travel and other costs incurred by royal visits to overseas provinces and countries within the Dutch Kingdom (former Netherlands Antilles and Aruba).

Costs relating to the security of members of the royal house, state visits, and the maintenance and upkeep of the royal palaces (which are considered to be national monuments) continue to be funded by the budgets of the appropriate Government Ministries and are not included in the budget for the royal house.

According to the State Budget for 2010, the budgetary allocation for the royal house in 2010 is €39.643 million. There are the following categories of expenditure:

- Allowances paid to the King, Queen Máxima, and the Princess under the Royal House Finances Act. They total some €7.102 million in 2010.
- Expenses incurred in the performance of official duties. They total some €26.818 million in 2010.
- Other expenses relating to the management of the royal house. They total some €5.723 million in 2010.

== Monarchs of the Netherlands ==
=== Wilhelmina (1890–1948) ===
When Wilhelmina came to the Dutch throne in 1890 at age 10, the throne of Luxembourg went to her very distant agnate (but incidentally also her maternal granduncle), Adolf, former Duke of Nassau. Thus ended the personal union between the Netherlands and Luxembourg.

The 58-year reign of Queen Wilhelmina was dominated by the two World Wars. She married a German prince, Duke Henry of Mecklenburg-Schwerin, who was not happy with his unrewarding role of husband-to-the-queen. Wilhelmina's strong personality and unrelenting passion to fulfill her inherited task overpowered many men in position of authority, including ministers, Prime Ministers and her own husband. She is mostly remembered for her role during World War II. The initial disappointment of many Dutch people because of her quick withdrawal to London faded (though it was never forgotten and by some was never forgiven) when she proved to be of great moral support to the people and the resistance in her occupied country, Netherlands. Hendrik and Wilhelmina had one daughter, Juliana, who came to the throne in 1948. They lived in The Hague and in Palace 't Loo (Paleis 't Loo) in Apeldoorn. She died in 1962.

=== Juliana (1948–1980) ===
Juliana reigned from 1948 until 1980, and whereas Wilhelmina reigned like a general, Juliana expressed a more motherly character. One of her first official acts was to sign the treaty of independence of the Dutch colony Indonesia. During her reign the monarchy became entangled in two major crises: the Greet Hofmans affair and the Lockheed bribery scandals. In the first it was her involvement in a mystic pacifist group that was a cause for concern. The second crisis announced itself when it became known that, the queen's husband, Prince Bernard von Lippe-Biesterfeld, had taken bribes to advance Lockheed's bid. After an inquiry, the prince was forbidden to perform the military tasks he had performed since 1945, but in this crisis neither the monarchy itself, nor Juliana's position, was ever in doubt. She and Bernhard had four daughters, Beatrix, Irene, Margriet and Christina. After their return from Ottawa, Ontario, Canada in 1945 (where Margriet was born), they lived in the Soestdijk Palace (Paleis Soestdijk) in Soestdijk, about 20 km north-east of Utrecht. She died on 20 March 2004. Her husband Bernhard died on 1 December 2004.

=== Beatrix (1980–2013) ===
The Dutch royal family today is much larger than it has ever been. Princess Beatrix and Prince Claus had three sons: King Willem-Alexander (married to Queen Máxima), Prince Friso (whose widow is Princess Mabel) and Prince Constantijn (married to Princess Laurentien). Her sister Princess Margriet and Pieter van Vollenhoven have four sons, princes Maurits, Bernhard, Pieter-Christiaan and Floris. Princess Margriet is in line to the throne behind King Willem-Alexander's daughters, princesses Catharina-Amalia, Alexia, and Ariane, and his brother Prince Constantijn. Prince Friso lost his right to the throne because no approval was asked for his marriage to Mabel Wisse Smit to the States-General. The two other sisters of Beatrix, Irene and Christina, lost their rights to the throne because their marriages were not approved by the States-General. They both married Roman Catholics and Irene herself converted to Roman Catholicism, which at that time (the 1960s) was still politically problematic. An additional complication which the government wanted to avoid, was that Irene's husband, Prince Carlos-Hugo of Bourbon-Parma (whom she later divorced), was a member of a deposed Spanish-Italian dynasty who controversially claimed the Spanish throne. Traditionally, Dutch monarchs have always been members of the Dutch Reformed Church although this was never constitutionally required. This tradition is embedded in the history of the Netherlands.

On 28 January 2013, the Queen announced that she would abdicate on 30 April 2013 in favour of her eldest son.

=== Willem-Alexander (2013–present) ===
The current monarch is King Willem-Alexander (born 1967), who has been on the throne since 30 April 2013. He studied history at the University of Leiden and became actively involved in water management. His wife is Queen Máxima (née Máxima Zorreguieta Cerruti), an economics major, whose father was a minister of agriculture in the dictatorial regime under General Videla in Argentina. Because of that their relationship was accompanied by fierce public debate and only officially sanctioned after quiet diplomacy, resulting in Máxima's father agreeing not to be present on their wedding day (2 February 2002). Former minister Max van der Stoel and Prime Minister Wim Kok seem to have played a crucial role in this process.

On 7 December 2003 Princess Máxima gave birth to a daughter: Princess Catharina-Amalia. On 26 June 2005 another daughter was born: Princess Alexia. On 10 April 2007 a third daughter was born, Princess Ariane. They are first, second and third in line to the Dutch throne.

His mother, Queen Beatrix abdicated the throne on 30 April 2013. On that day, Willem-Alexander became the new King and was sworn in and inaugurated in the Nieuwe Kerk in Amsterdam, in a session of the States-General.

=== Heir apparent ===
The heir apparent to the Dutch throne is Amalia, Princess of Orange.

== Full title ==
Most members of the Dutch royal family, in addition to other titles, hold (or held) the princely title Prince of Orange-Nassau. The children of Prince Friso and Prince Constantijn are instead counts and countesses of Orange-Nassau. In addition to the titles King/Prince of the Netherlands and Prince of Orange-Nassau, daughters of Queen Juliana and Prince Bernhard of Lippe-Biesterfeld hold another princely title – Princesses of Lippe-Biesterfeld. The children of Queen Beatrix and their male-line descendants, except for the children of King Willem-Alexander, also carry the appellative Honourable (Jonkheer/Jonkvrouw) in combination with the name 'Van Amsberg'.

Queen Juliana, the only child of Queen Wilhelmina and Duke Henry of Mecklenburg-Schwerin, was also a Duchess of Mecklenburg-Schwerin. Since the title can pass only through the male line, Queen Juliana's descendants do not carry the title of Duke of Mecklenburg-Schwerin.

The title Prince of the Netherlands is the prerogative of the most important members of the royal house (children of the monarch and of the heir apparent), which is smaller than the royal family. Members of the royal house can lose their membership when they enter into marriage without asking (and receiving) consent from Parliament.

In addition to this, the Dutch Monarch carries a number of subsidiary titles, of more historical than practical note, that have been passed down through the House of Orange-Nassau and represent the accretion of lands and influence by their ancestors:

Duke of Limburg, Count of Katzenelnbogen, Vianden, Diez, Spiegelberg, Buren, Leerdam and Culemborg, Marquis of Veere and Vlissingen, Baron of Breda, Diest, Beilstein, the town of Grave and the lands of Cuyk, IJsselstein, Cranendonk, Eindhoven and Liesveld, Hereditary Lord and Seigneur of Ameland, Lord of Borculo, Bredevoort, Lichtenvoorde, 't Loo, Geertruidenberg, Klundert, Zevenbergen, Hoge and Lage Zwaluwe, Naaldwijk, Polanen, St Maartensdijk, Soest, Baarn and Ter Eem, Willemstad, Steenbergen, Montfort, St Vith, Bütgenbach and Dasburg, Viscount of Antwerp.

Probably the most important of these was the Barony of Breda, which formed the core of the Nassau lands in the Netherlands (Brabant) even before they inherited the Principality of Orange in what is now southern France. This was probably followed by the Viscountship/Burgravate of Antwerp, which allowed William the Silent to control a large amount of the politics in that then very important city, followed by the Marquisate of Veere, which allowed William the Silent and his descendants to control the votes of the province of Zeeland.

== The royal family and the royal house ==
A distinction is made in the Netherlands between the royal family and the royal house. The royal family includes people born into the family (and legally recognised as such) or who have married into the family. However, not every member of the royal family is a member of the royal house.

By Act of Parliament, the members of the royal house are:

- the monarch (King or Queen);
- the former monarch (upon abdication);
- the members of the royal family in the line of succession to the throne who are not further removed from the monarch than the second degree of consanguinity;
- Princess Margriet of the Netherlands;
- the spouses of the above.

Members of the royal house can lose their membership and designation as prince or princess of the Netherlands if they marry without the consent of the Dutch Parliament. This happened to Prince Friso when he married Mabel Wisse Smit. This is stated explicitly in the part of the Constitution of the Netherlands that controls the monarchy of the Netherlands.

=== Members of the royal house ===
According to the official website, the members of the royal house are currently:

- King Willem-Alexander (the sovereign)
- Queen Maxima (the king's wife)
  - Princess Catharina-Amalia, Princess of Orange (the king's first daughter and heir)
  - Princess Alexia (the king's second daughter)
  - Princess Ariane (the king's third daughter)

Princess Beatrix (the king's mother and predecessor)

- Prince Constantijn (the king's brother) and Princess Laurentien (the king's sister-in-law)

Princess Margriet (the king's aunt) and Pieter van Vollenhoven (the king's uncle)

=== Members of the royal family ===
According to the official website, the royal family consists of the members of the royal house plus other legitimate descendants of Queen Juliana:

- Descendants of Princess Beatrix
  - Children of Prince Constantijn
    - Countess Eloise of Orange-Nassau, Jonkvrouwe van Amsberg
    - Count Claus-Casimir of Orange-Nassau, Jonkheer van Amsberg
    - Countess Leonore of Orange-Nassau, Jonkvrouwe van Amsberg
  - Princess Mabel of Orange-Nassau
    - Countess Luana of Orange-Nassau
    - Countess Zaria of Orange-Nassau
- Princess Irene of the Netherlands
  - Prince Carlos Xavier, The Duke of Parma and Piacenza
  - Princess Annemarie, The Duchess of Parma and Piacenza
    - Prince Hugo de Bourbon de Parme (born illegitimate son of Prince Carlos Xavier and Brigitte Klynstra)
    - Princess Luisa Irene, The Marchioness of Castell'Arquato
    - Princess Cecilia Maria, The Countess of Berceto
    - Prince Carlos, The Prince of Piacenza
  - Princess Margarita, The Countess of Colorno
  - Tjalling ten Cate
    - Julia ten Cate
    - Paola ten Cate
  - Prince Jaime, The Count of Bardi
  - Princess Viktória, The Countess of Bardi
    - Princess Zita Clara of Bourbon-Parma
    - Princess Gloria Irene of Bourbon-Parma
  - Princess Carolina, The Marchioness of Sala
  - Albert Brenninkmeijer
    - Alaïa-Maria Brenninkmeijer
    - Xavier Brenninkmeijer
- Descendants of Princess Margriet
  - Prince Maurits of Orange-Nassau, van Vollenhoven
  - Princess Marilène of Orange-Nassau, van Vollenhoven-van den Broek
    - Anna van Lippe-Biesterfeld van Vollenhoven
    - Lucas van Lippe-Biesterfeld van Vollenhoven
    - Felicia van Lippe-Biesterfeld van Vollenhoven
  - Prince Bernhard of Orange-Nassau, van Vollenhoven
  - Princess Annette of Orange-Nassau, van Vollenhoven-Sekrève
    - Isabella van Vollenhoven
    - Samuel van Vollenhoven
    - Benjamin van Vollenhoven
  - Prince Pieter-Christiaan of Orange-Nassau, van Vollenhoven
  - Princess Anita of Orange-Nassau, van Vollenhoven-van Eijk
    - Emma van Vollenhoven
    - Pieter van Vollenhoven
  - Prince Floris of Orange-Nassau, van Vollenhoven
  - Princess Aimée of Orange-Nassau, van Vollenhoven-Söhngen
    - Magali van Vollenhoven
    - Eliane van Vollenhoven
    - Willem Jan van Vollenhoven
- Descendants of the late Princess Christina
  - Bernardo Guillermo
  - Eva Guillermo
    - Isabel Guillermo
    - Julián Guillermo
  - Nicolás Guillermo
    - Joaquín Guillermo
    - Carmen Guillermo
  - Juliana Guillermo
    - Kai Bodhi
    - Numa Bodhi
    - Aida Bodhi

=== Family tree of current members ===
Queen Juliana	Prince Bernhard
Queen Beatrix*	Prince Claus	Princess Irene^	Prince Carlos Hugo, Duke of Parma (div. 1981)	Princess Margriet, Mrs. van Vollenhoven*^	Prof. Pieter van Vollenhoven*^	Princess Christina	Jorge Guillermo (div. 1996)
Bernardo Guillermo^	Eva Marie Valdez^	Nicolás Guillermo^	Juliana Guillermo^
Prince Maurits^	Princess Marilène^	Prince Bernhard^	Princess Annette^	Prince Pieter-Christiaan^	Princess Anita^	Princess Aimée^	Prince Floris^
The Duke of Parma^	The Duchess of Parma^	The Countess of Colorno^	Tjalling Siebe ten Cate^	The Count of Bardi^	The Countess of Bardi^	The Marchioness of Sala^	Albert Brenninkmeijer^
The King*	The Queen*	Prince Friso	Princess Mabel**	Prince Constantijn*	Princess Laurentien*
The Princess of Orange*	Princess Alexia*	Princess Ariane*	Countess Luana**	Countess Zaria**	Countess Eloise**	Count Claus-Casimir**	Countess Leonore**

Notes

* Member of the Dutch royal house

** Member of the royal family

^ Member of the extended royal family

== Standards ==
The Dutch royal family also makes extensive use of royal standards that are based on their coats of arms. While these are heraldic flags, they are not a person's coat of arms in banner form as the British royal family does. Some examples from the royal family's website are:

- The standards of the ruling king or queen:
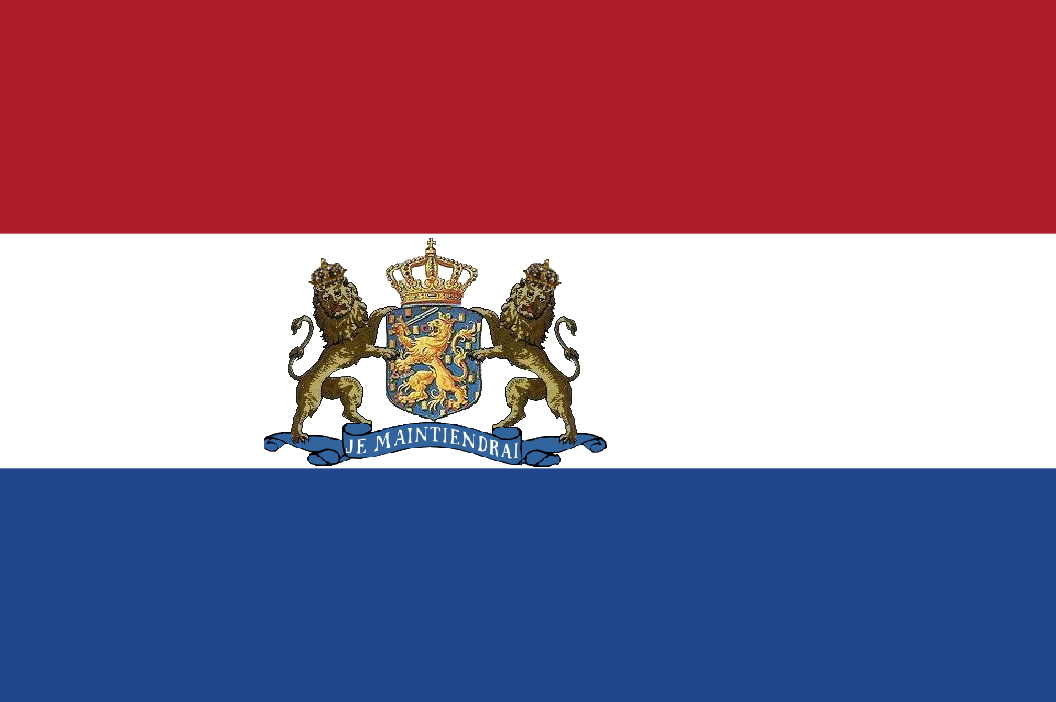
Royal Flag of the Netherlands until 1908

Current Royal Standard of the Netherlands
- The standards of the current sons of Princess Beatrix and their wives, and the Princess' husband:
Royal Standard of the Princes of the Netherlands (Sons of Queen Beatrix)

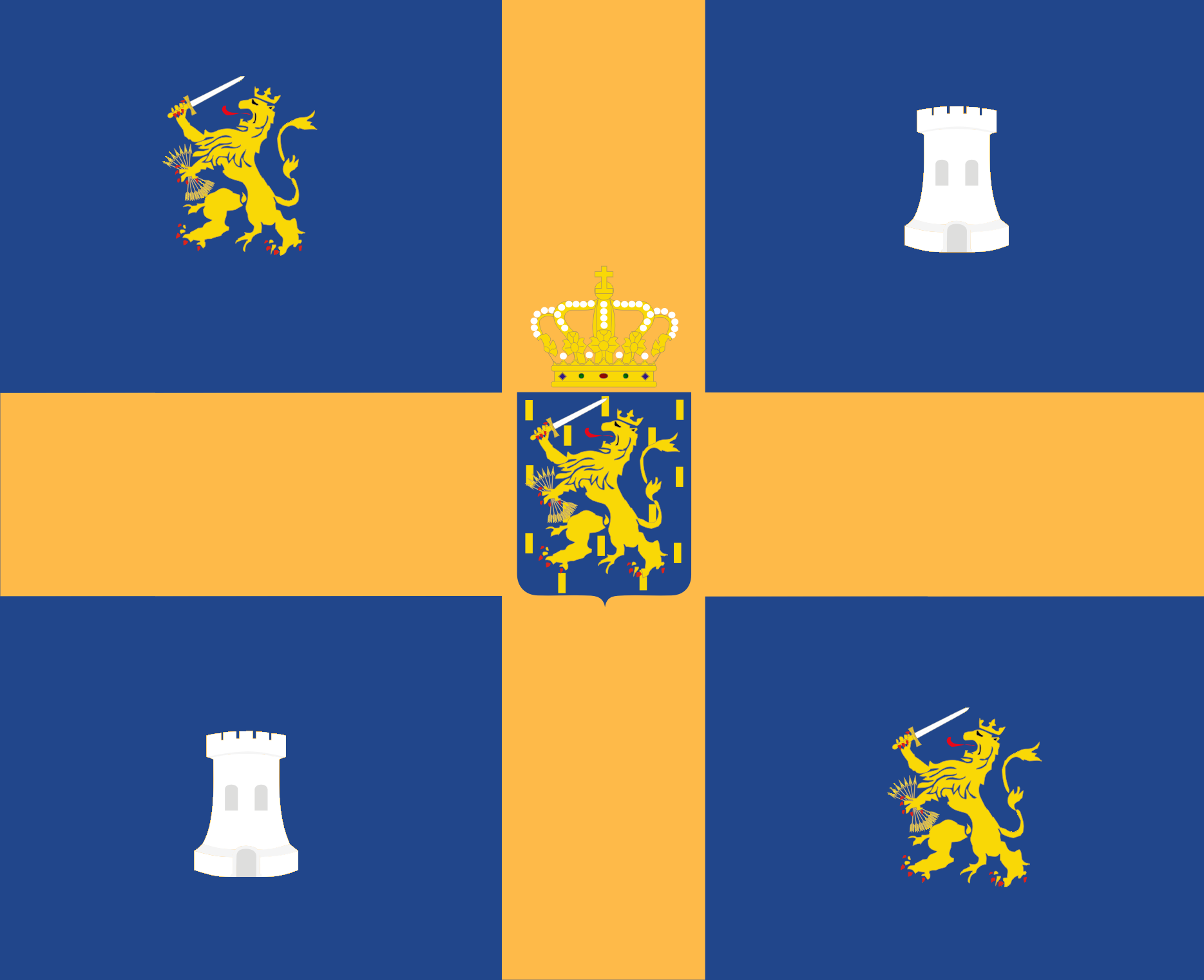
Standard of Claus von Amsberg as Royal consort of the Netherlands

Standard of Princess Máxima of the Netherlands

Standard of Princess Laurentien of the Netherlands
- The standards of the sisters of Princess Beatrix and their children:
Standard of the Princesses of the Netherlands (Daughters of Queen Juliana)

Standard of the Princes of Oranje-Nassau (Sons of Princess Margriet )
- The standards of former members of the royal family:
Standard of Juliana of the Netherlands as Princess

Standard of Bernhard of Lippe-Biesterfeld as Royal consort of the Netherlands

Standard of Hendrik of Mecklenburg-Schwerin as Royal consort of the Netherlands

Standard of Queen Mother Emma of the Netherlands

Standard of Marie of Wied, Princess of the Netherlands

== Monograms ==
Like most Royal Families, the Dutch royal family also makes use of royal monograms. Some examples from the royal family's website are:

- The monograms of the ruling kings or queens:
King Willem-Alexander

Queen Beatrix

Queen Juliana

Queen Juliana, Variant

Queen Wilhelmina

William I-III

William I
- The monograms of some members of the royal family;
Queen Anna Pavlovna

Queen Sophie

Queen Emma

Queen Emma, Variant

Prince Henry

Prince Bernhard

Queen Juliana and Prince Bernhard

Prince Claus

Queen Máxima

Willem-Alexander and Máxima

Prince Friso

Prince Friso and Princess Mabel

Prince Constantijn

Princess Laurentien

Prince Constantijn and Princess Laurentien

Catharina Amalia, The Princess of Orange

== See also ==
- List of heirs to the Dutch throne
- List of monarchs of the Netherlands
- List of rulers of the Netherlands
- List of stadtholders for the Low Countries provinces
- Monarchies in Europe
