= Princess Anita of Orange-Nassau =

Member of the Dutch royal family (born 1969)

Princess Anita
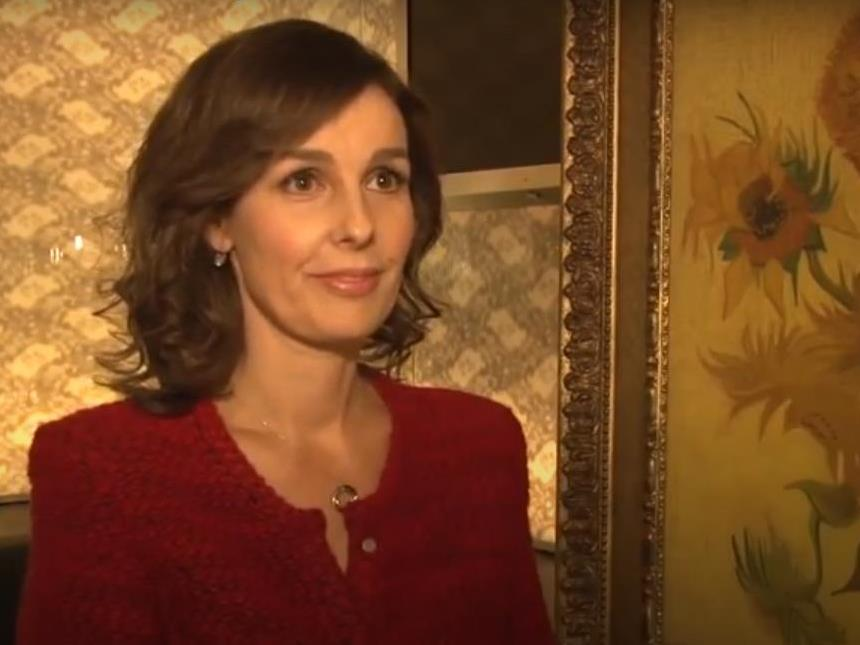
- Princess Anita in 2013
- Born: 27 October 1969 (age 56); Neuchâtel, Switzerland
- Spouse: Prince Pieter Christiaan of Orange-Nassau, van Vollenhoven (m. 2005)
- Issue: Emma van Vollenhoven; Pieter van Vollenhoven
Names
- Anita Theodora van Eijk
- Father: Leonardus Antonius van Eijk
- Mother: J.C.M. van Eijk-Steens

Princess Anita of Orange-Nassau (Anita Theodora, née van Eijk; born 27 October 1969) is a member of the Dutch royal family. She is the wife of Prince Pieter-Christiaan of Orange-Nassau, van Vollenhoven.

== Early life ==
Anita van Eijk was born in Neuchâtel, Switzerland, the daughter of Leonardus Antonius van Eijk and J.C.M. van Eijk-Steens. She spent her early childhood in Aix-en-Provence, France, before the family headed back to the Netherlands where she undertook her primary school education. The family then moved to Singapore, where she studied at the United World College of South East Asia, before returning to the Netherlands, where she completed an International Baccalaureate at the Rijnlands Lyceum Oegstgeest.

She studied English and literature at Leiden University and afterwards communications at the University of Amsterdam, where she graduated in 1996. During her university years, Anita undertook an internship in London at the J. Walter Thompson advertising agency. Anita was employed in 1997 by the Amsterdam branch of Bloomberg, and was subsequently sent to London for a stint in Sales/Marketing and Television Production. She then worked in the marketing department of auction house Christie’s.

== Marriage and children ==
Van Eijk met Prince Pieter-Christiaan of Orange-Nassau, van Vollenhoven in London and the couple announced their engagement on 25 February 2005. Prince Pieter-Christiaan is the third son of Princess Margriet of the Netherlands and Pieter van Vollenhoven.

They married in a civil ceremony on 25 August 2005 at the Het Loo Palace, Apeldoorn, which was followed by a religious ceremony on 27 August 2005 at the Grote of St. Jeroenskerk, currently known as Oude Jeroenskerk, in Noordwijk. Since Prince Pieter-Christiaan did not seek parliamentary approval for his marriage, owing to the remote chance of his succession to the throne, he lost his place in line to the Dutch throne upon his marriage.

On 9 June 2006, Pieter-Christiaan and his wife announced that they were expecting their first child. Anita gave birth to a daughter, Emma Francisca Catharina van Vollenhoven, on 28 November 2006. The baby was born at 6:00 pm at the Onze Lieve Vrouwe Gasthuis in Amsterdam. Anita gave birth to their second child, Pieter Anton Maurits Erik, on 19 November 2008.

The family lives in Noordwijk.
