= Pieter van Vollenhoven =

Dutch royal (born 1939)

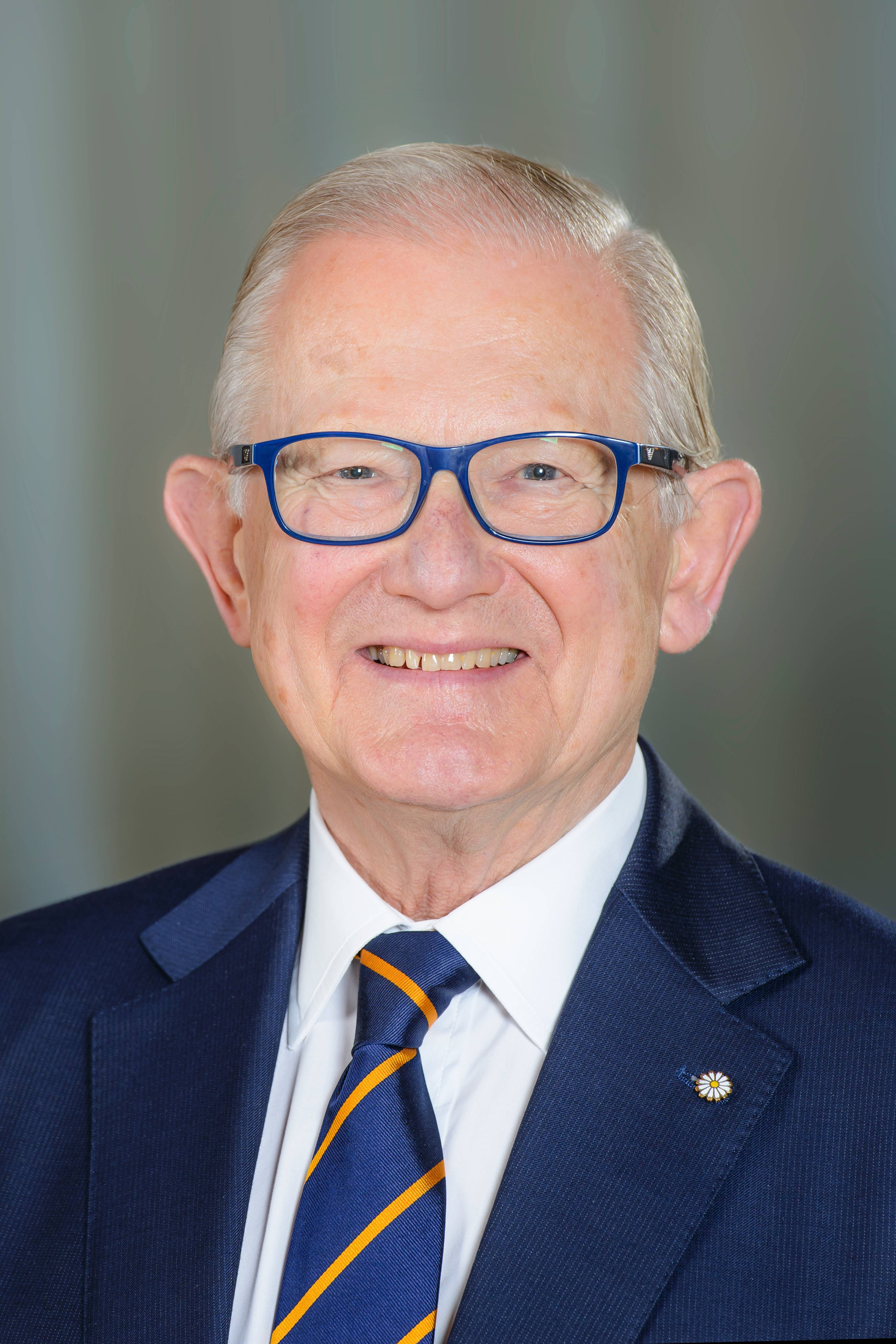
- Van Vollenhoven in 2015
- Born: 30 April 1939 (age 87); Schiedam, Netherlands
- Education: Leiden University
- Occupation: Emeritus Professor
- Organization(s): Dutch Transport Safety Board; Dutch Safety Board
- Title: Master of Laws
- Spouse: Princess Margriet of the Netherlands (m. 1967)
- Children: Prince Maurits; Prince Bernhard; Prince Pieter-Christiaan; Prince Floris
- Parent(s): Pieter van Vollenhoven Sr. Jacoba Gijsbertha Stuyling de Lange

Pieter van Vollenhoven Jr. (born 30 April 1939) is the husband of Princess Margriet of the Netherlands and a member, by marriage, of the Dutch royal house.

== Early life and career ==
Van Vollenhoven was born in Schiedam, he is the second son of Pieter van Vollenhoven Sr. (1897–1977) and his wife Jacoba Gijsbertha Stuylingh de Lange (1906–1983). The Van Vollenhoven family and the Stuylingh de Lange family belong to the Dutch patriciate.

Van Vollenhoven attended secondary school in Rotterdam, and he subsequently studied law at the University of Leiden. He graduated in 1965, after which he worked as a legal officer for the Netherlands Council of State. In 1966, he performed his military service with the Royal Netherlands Air Force, and attained a military pilot license the following year.

== Current positions ==
Van Vollenhoven is currently best known in the Netherlands for having been the chairman of the Dutch Safety Board from which he retired in February 2011. He was originally appointed chairman of the Road Transportation Safety Board and the Rail Incident Board by minister Tjerk Westerterp. Following the Bijlmer and Hercules disasters, a need was felt in The Netherlands for a single body to investigate all transportation-related incidents; the Transportation Safety Council (Dutch: Raad voor de Transportveiligheid) was created, which incorporated the earlier Road Transportation Safety and Rail Incident Boards and also had Van Vollenhoven as chairman. Van Vollenhoven felt, however, that the country should have a single board to investigate all safety-related issues; lobbying on his part finally convinced the government to transform the Transportation Safety Council into a general Safety Board, of which Van Vollenhoven was made the first chairman.

Due to his expertise in the area, the University of Twente made Van Vollenhoven a professor on 1 October 2005. He holds the policy research chair, which is a subspecialty of the risk management group. He held his oration on 28 April 2006, and called for the creation of a Minister of Safety at that time.

In 1989, Van Vollenhoven took the initiative in setting up the Dutch Victim Support Fund, of which he is also the chairman. He is also chairman of the Nationaal Groenfonds, the National Restorationfund and the Society, Safety and Police Association and the International Transport Safety Board. He is a member of the European Transport Safety Council.

=== Notable acts ===
As Chairman of the Safety Board, Van Vollenhoven oversaw the investigation of the Schipholbrand, a fire in a holding facility for illegal immigrants in The Netherlands. He presented a final report on 21 September 2006, with such devastating findings that ministers Piet Hein Donner and Sybilla Dekker resigned over it. A third responsible minister, Rita Verdonk refused to resign despite her responsibility in the matter.

Following the Turkish Airlines Flight 1951 crash, Van Vollenhoven led the investigation by the Safety Board. This investigation brought him into conflict with the Office of the Attorney General, which requested access to the black box data. Citing that there was no reason at that time to suspect foul play and that the Board investigation would be hampered by the threat of legal action against persons, Van Vollenhoven absolutely refused this access.

When he turned 70, Barry Sweedler (of the US National Transportation Safety Board) said to him: "The world is a safer place because of your work and leadership".

== Hobbies ==
Van Vollenhoven is an avid pianist. In 1986 he formed a trio – De Gevleugelde Vrienden – with two of the country's leading pianists (Pim Jacobs and Louis van Dijk) and gave some twenty concerts a year both at home and abroad in aid of the Victim Support Fund. De Gevleugelde Vrienden were awarded four gold discs. After the death of one of the members of the trio, Pim Jacobs, Van Vollenhoven continued to give concerts with pianists Louis van Dijk and Koos Mark.

Van Vollenhoven is still an active pilot and he also dives. He almost lost the tip of his right index finger during a dive in 2005, when he got caught between the boat and the dock steps. Doctors were able to reattach the tip.

He is also a photographer. The Victim Support Fund raised money in 2008 and 2009 by selling calendars with his photographs.

== Health ==
Van Vollenhoven was diagnosed with a Melanoma, a common type of skin cancer, in May 2017. He had it removed at the Netherlands Cancer Institute in Amsterdam. In November that same year, he was diagnosed with another Melanoma and had it removed.

== Marriage and family ==
Van Vollenhoven married Princess Margriet of the Netherlands at The Hague on 10 January 1967, in the St. James Church. This made him the first member of the Dutch Royal House being a commoner and not of royal or noble origin. He was not given any royal titles as a result of the marriage and is therefore formally addressed as "Mister Van Vollenhoven" or by his professional title as "Professor Van Vollenhoven".

The couple went to live in Het Loo House, near the Het Loo Palace. They have four sons:

- Prince Maurits of Orange-Nassau, van Vollenhoven (born 17 April 1968), married Marilène van den Broek (born 4 February 1970);
- Prince Bernhard of Orange-Nassau, van Vollenhoven (born 25 December 1969), married Annette Sekrève (born 18 April 1972);
- Prince Pieter-Christiaan of Orange-Nassau, van Vollenhoven (born 22 March 1972), married Anita van Eijk (born 27 October 1969);
- Prince Floris of Orange-Nassau, van Vollenhoven (born 10 April 1975), married Aimée Söhngen (born 19 October 1977).

The German house name Lippe-Biesterfeld is borne by the children of Prince Maurits (making them Van Lippe-Biesterfeld van Vollenhoven); his other (grand)children are just van Vollenhoven.

== Honours and awards ==
The Ribbon Bar of Prof. Pieter van Vollenhoven

Coat of arms

Van Vollenhoven received numerous honours and awards in the Netherlands but also internationally:

Country	Date	Appointment	Ribbon	Other
Netherlands	29 April 2004	Knight Grand Cross of the Order of the Netherlands Lion		
Netherlands	10 January 1967	Grand Cross of the Order of the House of Orange		
Netherlands	10 March 1966	Wedding Medal of Princess Beatrix, and Claus von Amsberg		
Netherlands	1980	The Netherlands Coronation Medal 1980		
Netherlands	1980	Medal visiting Netherlands Antilles 1980		
Netherlands	2002	Royal Wedding Medal 2002		
Netherlands	Officer's Long Service Decoration (The Netherlands), with Roman numeral LV			
Netherlands	2013	King Willem-Alexander Inauguration Medal 2013		
Belgium		Grand Cross of the Order of the Crown		
Cameroon		Grand Cordon of Order of Merit		
Germany		Grand Cross First class of the Order of Merit of the Federal Republic of Germany		
Finland		Grand Cross of the Order of the White Rose of Finland		
France		Grand Cross of the National Order of Merit		
Italy		Grand Cross of the Order of Merit of the Italian Republic		
Ivory Coast		Grand Cross of the National Order		
Japan		Grand Cordon of the Order of the Sacred Treasure		
Jordan		Grand Cordon of the Supreme Order of the Renaissance		
Luxembourg		Grand Cross of the Order of Adolphe of Nassau		
Luxembourg		Grand Cross of the Order of the Oak Crown		
Luxembourg		Commemorative Medal of the marriage of TRH Prince Jean and Princess Josephine-Charlotte of Luxembourg		
Norway		Grand Cross of the Royal Norwegian Order of Merit		
Poland	2012	Commander's Cross of the Order of Merit of the Republic of Poland		
Portugal		Grand Cross of the Order of Prince Henry		
Socialist Republic of Romania		Grand Cross of the Order of 23 August		
Senegal		Grand Cross of the National Order of the Lion		

=== Honorary citizenship ===
On 12 June 2004, he was made an Honorary citizen of the town of Vollenhove.
