= Princess Annette of Orange-Nassau, van Vollenhoven-Sekrève =

Dutch princess

Princess Annette
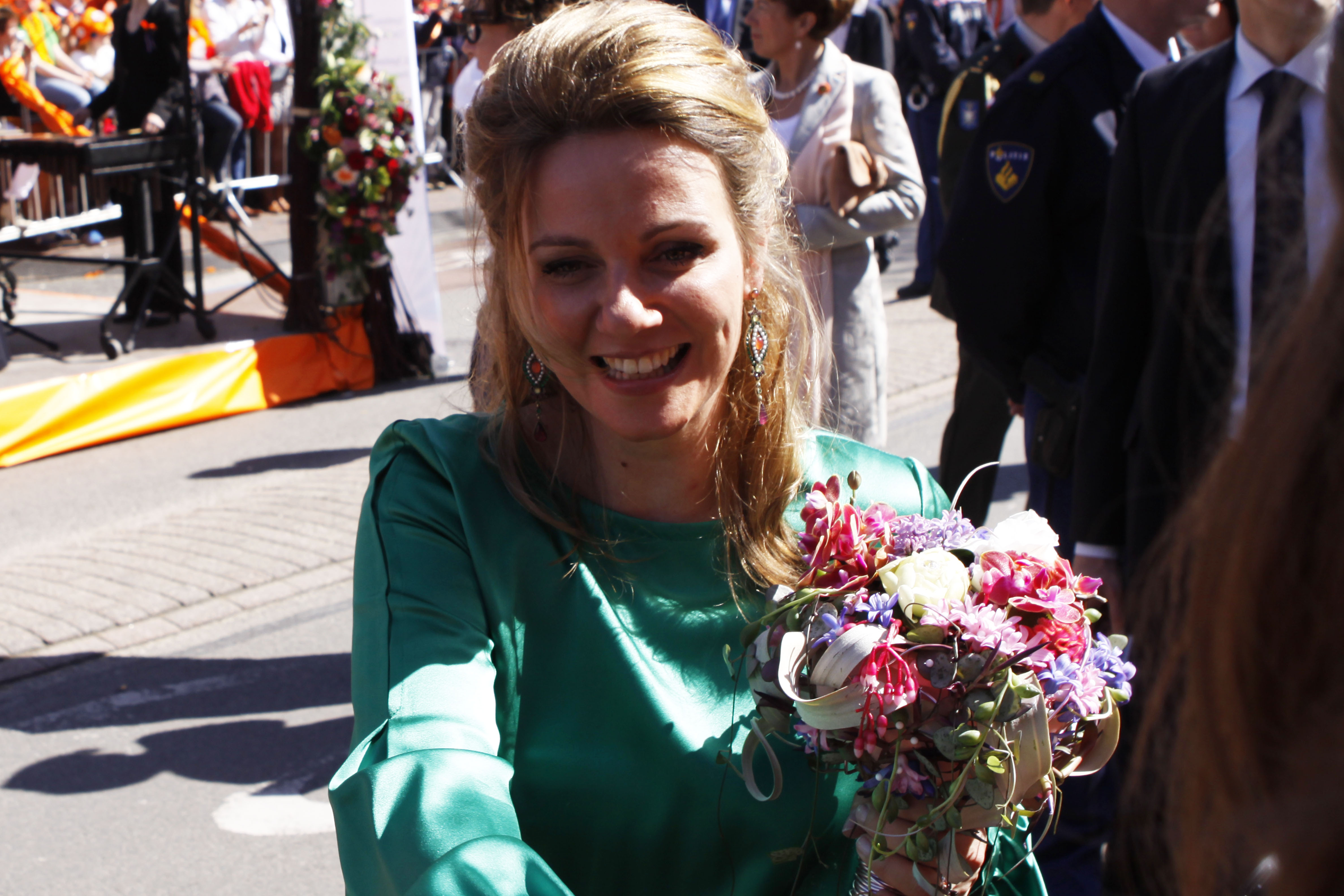
- Princess Annette in 2012
- Born: 18 April 1972 (age 54); The Hague, Netherlands
- Spouse: Prince Bernhard of Orange-Nassau, van Vollenhoven (m. 2000; sep. 2026)
- Issue: Isabella van Vollenhoven; Samuel van Vollenhoven; Benjamin van Vollenhoven
- House: Orange-Nassau (by marriage)
- Father: Ulrich Sekrève
- Mother: Jolanda de Haan

Princess Annette of Orange-Nassau, van Vollenhoven-Sekrève (legal name: Annette van Vollenhoven-Sekrève; born 18 April 1972) was the wife of Prince Bernhard of Orange-Nassau, van Vollenhoven, the second son of Princess Margriet of the Netherlands and Pieter van Vollenhoven.

Annette Sekrève was born in The Hague, the daughter of Ulrich Sekrève and his wife Jolanda de Haan (the De Haan belong to the Dutch patriciate). She obtained her vwo diploma in 1991 and studied from 1991 till 1996 at Groningen University where she obtained an MSc degree in psychology. It was at university that she met her future husband, Prince Bernhard.

The couple announced their engagement on 11 March 2000. They married in July 2000. The civil ceremony was performed on 6 July 2000 by the Mayor of Utrecht, Ms A. H. Brouwer-Korf, in the Spiegelzaal van het Paushuize, Utrecht. The marriage was blessed two days later, on 8 July 2000, by Dr. Anne van der Meiden in the Cathedral of Saint Martin, Utrecht. Annette then acquired the courtesy title Her Highness, Princess of Orange-Nassau, van Vollenhoven due to her status as the wife of a Prince of Orange-Nassau. In January 2026, Annette and Bernhard announced that they were to divorce.

Annette and Bernhard have three children:

- Isabella Lily Juliana van Vollenhoven, born in Amsterdam, on 14 May 2002
- Samuel Bernhard Louis van Vollenhoven, born in Amsterdam, on 25 May 2004
- Benjamin Pieter Floris van Vollenhoven, born in Amsterdam, on 12 March 2008
