= Princess Margriet of the Netherlands =

Dutch princess (born 1943)

Princess Margriet
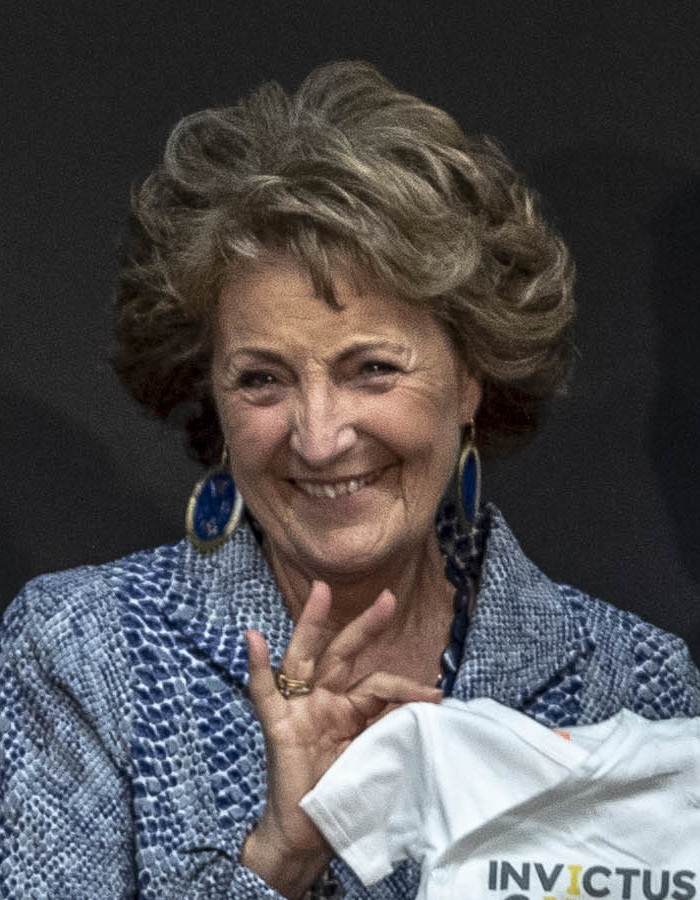
- Margriet in 2019
- Born: 19 January 1943 (age 83); Ottawa Civic Hospital, Ottawa, Ontario, Canada (Note: Princess Margriet was born in an area temporarily declared extraterritorial for the moment of her birth by Canada.)
- Spouse: Pieter van Vollenhoven (m. 1967)
- Issue: Prince Maurits; Prince Bernhard; Prince Pieter-Christiaan; Prince Floris
Names
- Margriet Francisca van Oranje-Nassau, van Lippe-Biesterfeld
- House: Orange-Nassau (official); Lippe (agnatic)
- Father: Prince Bernhard of Lippe-Biesterfeld
- Mother: Juliana of the Netherlands

Princess Margriet of the Netherlands (Margriet Francisca; born 19 January 1943) is the third daughter of Queen Juliana and Prince Bernhard. As an aunt of the reigning monarch, King Willem-Alexander, she is a member of the Dutch Royal House and currently eighth and last in the line of succession to the throne.

Princess Margriet has often represented the monarch at official or semi-official events. Some of these functions have taken her back to Canada, the country where she was born de facto, and to events organised by the Dutch merchant navy of which she is a patron.

== Birth and Canada ==
Margriet was born to Princess Juliana of the Netherlands and Prince Bernhard of Lippe-Biesterfeld. Her mother was heir presumptive to Queen Wilhelmina.

The Dutch royal family went into exile when the Netherlands was occupied by Nazi Germany in 1940, and went to live in Canada. Margriet was born in Ottawa Civic Hospital, Ottawa. The maternity ward of the hospital was temporarily declared to be extraterritorial by the Canadian government. This ensured that the newborn would not be born in Canada, and not be a British subject under the rule of jus soli. Instead, the child would only inherit Dutch citizenship from her mother under the principle of jus sanguinis, which is followed in Dutch nationality law. Thus, the child would be eligible to succeed to the throne of the Netherlands. This would have applied if the child had been male, and therefore heir apparent to Juliana, or if her two older sisters died without eligible children.

It is a common misconception that the Canadian government declared the maternity ward to be Dutch territory. That was not necessary, as Canada follows jus soli, while the Netherlands follows jus sanguinis. It was sufficient for Canada to disclaim the territory temporarily.

Princess Margriet was named after the marguerite, the flower worn during the war as a symbol of the resistance to Nazi Germany. She was christened at St. Andrew's Presbyterian Church, Ottawa, on 29 June 1943. Her godparents included US President Franklin D. Roosevelt, Queen Mary (Queen dowager of the United Kingdom), Märtha, Crown Princess of Norway, and Martine Roell (lady-in-waiting to Princess Juliana in Canada).

Princess Margriet has continued to visit Canada over the years in an official capacity, as recently as 2017 (Stratford, Ontario and Goderich, Ontario) and 2026 (Ottawa).

== After the war ==
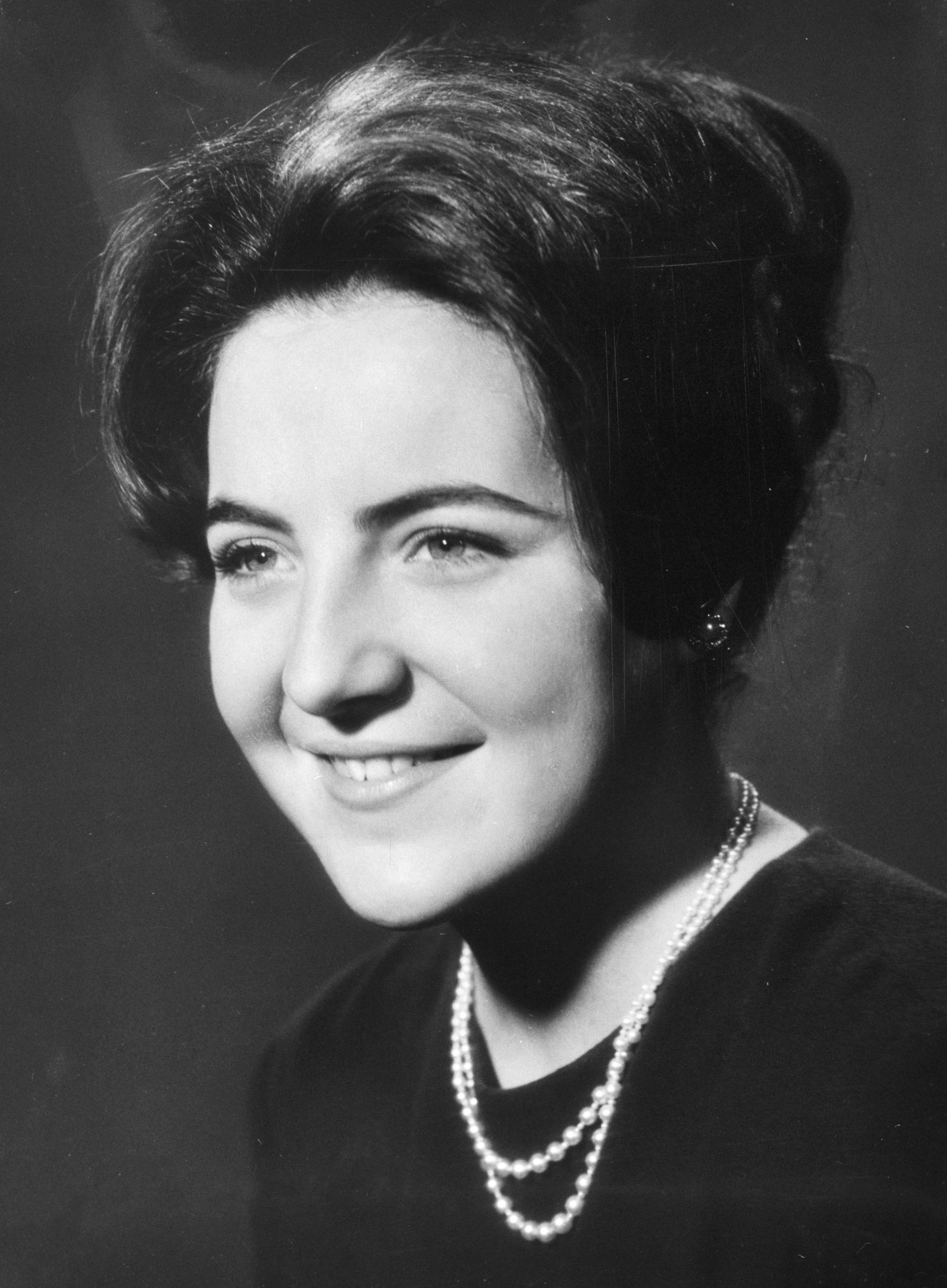
Margriet in 1964

It was not until August 1945, when the Netherlands had been liberated, that Princess Margriet first set foot on Dutch soil. Princess Juliana and Prince Bernhard returned to Soestdijk Palace in Baarn, where the family had lived before the war.

While she was studying at Leiden University, Princess Margriet met her future husband, Pieter van Vollenhoven. Their engagement was announced on 10 March 1965, and they were married on 10 January 1967 in The Hague, in the St. James Church. It was decreed that any children from the marriage would be titled Prince/Princess of Orange-Nassau, van Vollenhoven, with the style of Highness, titles that would not be held by their descendants. Together, they had four sons:

- Prince Maurits Willem Pieter Hendrik of Orange-Nassau, van Vollenhoven (born on 17 April 1968, Utrecht, Netherlands). He married Marilène (Marie-Helène) Angela van den Broek (born on 4 February 1970, Dieren, Rheden, Netherlands) on 30 May 1998. They have three children.
- Prince Bernhard Lucas Emmanuel of Orange-Nassau, van Vollenhoven (born on 25 December 1969, Nijmegen, Netherlands). He married Annette Sekrève (born on 18 April 1972, The Hague, Netherlands) on 8 July 2000. They have three children.
- Prince Pieter-Christiaan Michiel of Orange-Nassau, van Vollenhoven, (born on 22 March 1972, Nijmegen, Netherlands). He married Anita Theodora van Eijk (born on 27 October 1969, Neuchâtel, Switzerland) on 27 August 2005. They have two children.
- Prince Floris Frederik Martijn of Orange-Nassau, van Vollenhoven, (born on 10 April 1975, Nijmegen, Netherlands). He married Aimée Leonie Allegonde Marie Söhngen (born on 18 October 1977, Amsterdam, Netherlands) on 20 October 2005. They have three children.

The Princess and her husband took up residence in the right wing of Het Loo Palace in Apeldoorn. In 1975 the family moved to their present home, Het Loo, which they had built on the Palace grounds.

== Interests and activities ==
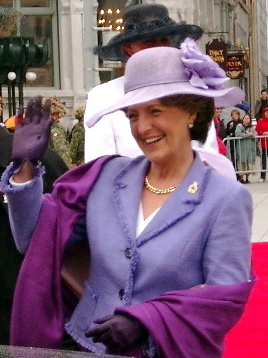
Princess Margriet arrives in Ottawa to attend the Canadian Tulip Festival in May 2002.

Princess Margriet is particularly interested in health care and cultural causes. From 1987 to 2011 she was vice-president of the Dutch Red Cross, who set up the Princess Margriet Fund in her honour. She is a member of the board of the International Federation of National Red Cross and Red Crescent Societies.

From 1984 to 2007, Princess Margriet was president of the European Cultural Foundation, who set up the Princess Margriet Award for Cultural Diversity in acknowledgement of her work.

She is a member of the honorary board of the International Paralympic Committee.

== Titles and styles ==
- 19 January 1943 – 10 January 1967: Her Royal Highness Princess Margriet of the Netherlands, Princess of Orange-Nassau, Princess of Lippe-Biesterfeld
- 10 January 1967 – present: Her Royal Highness Princess Margriet of the Netherlands, Princess of Orange-Nassau, Princess of Lippe-Biesterfeld, Mrs Van Vollenhoven

=== National honours ===
- Knight Grand Cross of the Order of the Netherlands Lion
- Royal Silver Wedding Medal of Queen Juliana and Prince Bernhard, 1962 (7 January 1962)
- Royal Wedding Medal 1966 (10 March 1966)
- Queen Beatrix Investiture Medal (30 April 1980)
- Royal Wedding Medal 2002 (2 February 2002)
- King Willem-Alexander Investiture Medal (30 April 2013)

=== Foreign honours ===
- Belgium: Grand Cross of the Order of the Crown
- Cameroon: Grand Cordon of Order of Merit
- Chile: Grand Cross of the Order of Merit
- Finland: Grand Cross of the Order of the White Rose of Finland
- France: Grand Cross of the Order of National Merit
- Germany: Grand Cross 1st Class of the Order of Merit of the Federal Republic of Germany
- Italy: Knight Grand Cross of the Order of Merit of the Italian Republic
- Ivory Coast: Grand Cross of the Order of the Ivory Coast
- Japan: Grand Cordon (Paulownia) of the Order of the Precious Crown
- Jordan: Grand Cordon of the Supreme Order of the Renaissance
- Luxembourg: Grand Cross of the Order of Adolphe of Nassau
- Luxembourg: Grand Cross of the Order of the Oak Crown
- Luxembourg: Commemorative Medal of the marriage of TRH Prince Henri and Princess Maria Teresa of Luxembourg
- Mexico: Grand Cross of the Order of the Aztec Eagle
- (Kingdom of Nepal) Nepalese Royal Family: Member 1st Class of the Order of the Three Divine Powers
- Norway: Grand Cross of the Order of Saint Olav
- Portugal: Grand Cross of the Order of Christ
- Socialist Republic of Romania: Grand Cross of the Order of 23 August
- Senegal: Grand Cross of the Order of the Lion
- Spain: Dame Grand Cross of the Order of Isabella the Catholic
- Suriname: Grand Cordon of the Order of the Yellow Star
- Sweden: Member Grand Cross of the Royal Order of the Polar Star
- United States: Honorary Fellow of the College of William & Mary
- Venezuela: Grand Cordon of the Order of the Liberator

== Notes ==
Princess Margriet of the Netherlands House of Orange-Nassau Cadet branch of the House of Nassau Born: 19 January 1943
Lines of succession
Preceded by Countess Leonore of Orange Nassau	Line of succession to the Dutch throne 8th position	Last in line
