= Prince Maurits of Orange-Nassau, van Vollenhoven =

Dutch Royal (born 1968)

Prince Maurits
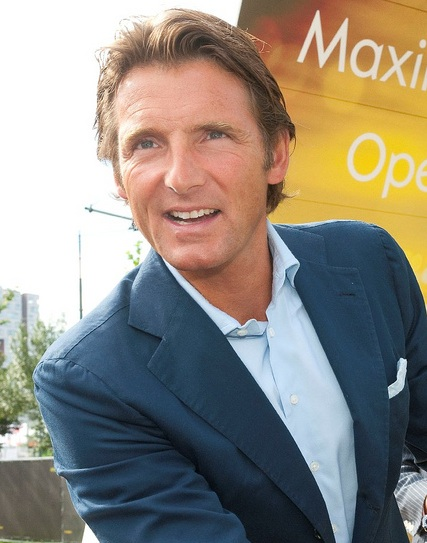
- Prince Maurits in 2010
- Born: 17 April 1968 (age 58); Utrecht, Netherlands
- Spouse: Marilène van den Broek (m. 1998)
- Issue: Anastasia van Lippe-Biesterfeld van Vollenhoven; Lucas van Lippe-Biesterfeld van Vollenhoven; Felicia van Lippe-Biesterfeld van Vollenhoven
Names
- Maurits Willem Pieter Hendrik van Oranje-Nassau, van Vollenhoven
- House: Orange-Nassau (official)
- Father: Pieter van Vollenhoven
- Mother: Princess Margriet of the Netherlands
- Occupation: Businessman, corporate director, nonprofit director, military officer

Prince Maurits Willem Pieter Hendrik of Orange-Nassau, van Vollenhoven (born 17 April 1968) is a member of the Dutch royal family as the eldest son of Princess Margriet of the Netherlands and Pieter van Vollenhoven.

Before the succession of his cousin Willem-Alexander as King, he was a member of the Dutch Royal House and tenth in the line of succession to the Dutch throne. With Willem-Alexander's succession however, he is no longer a member of the Dutch Royal House, and is no longer in line to direct succession to the Dutch throne.

== Life and career ==
Maurits was born on 17 April 1968. His godparents are Princess Christina of the Netherlands, Prince Alois-Konstantin of Lowenstein-Wertheim-Rosenberg, Jhr. G. Krayenhof, and The Dutch Merchant Fleet. Van Vollenhoven has three brothers: Bernhard, Pieter-Christiaan, Floris.

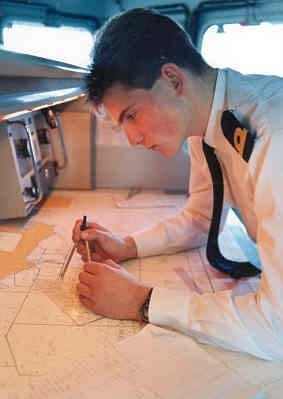
Prince Maurits as sub-lieutenant aboard one of the Dutch warships

In 1987, van Vollenhoven performed military service with the Royal Netherlands Marine Corps and the Royal Netherlands Navy. He graduated at University of Groningen in 1995, where he obtained a MSc degree in Economics. After his study he worked for the Schiphol Airport Authority, where he occupied several positions, including Senior Manager of Passenger Services. From September 2001 to May 2006, the prince worked for Philips (Domestic Appliances and Personal Care) in Amersfoort, where he was in charge of part of the Philishave portfolio.

In May 2006, van Vollenhoven started his own business, The Source, which focuses on innovative concepts for products, services and systems for both business and government. Since 1 May 2013, Maurits is Aide-de-camp to King Willem-Alexander and promoted to the rank of Commander (Dutch: Kapitein-lieutenant ter Zee) in the Royal Netherlands Navy.

Maurits works for Sunrock, a company which invests in solar parks and green energy. In April 2023, he gave an exceptional interview to writer Kemal Rijken at the Amsterdam television channel AT5. The prince criticised the solar energy policy of the municipality of Amsterdam and opened up about other topics.

== Marriage and family ==
In 1989, van Vollenhoven met Marilène (Marie-Helène) van den Broek b. 4 February 1970, the youngest daughter of Hans van den Broek and Josee van Schendel. Their civil marriage ceremony was in Apeldoorn on 29 May 1998, followed by a religious ceremony on 30 May. He was the first grandchild of Queen Juliana and Prince Bernhard of the Netherlands who married.

Together, the couple has three children:

- Anastasia (Anna) Margriet Joséphine van Lippe-Biesterfeld van Vollenhoven (Amsterdam, 15 April 2001) - the first legitimate great-grandchild of Queen Juliana and Prince Bernhard,
- Lucas Maurits Pieter Henri van Lippe-Biesterfeld van Vollenhoven (Amsterdam, 26 October 2002),
- Felicia Juliana Bénedicte Barbara van Lippe-Biesterfeld van Vollenhoven (Amsterdam, 31 May 2005).

By Royal Decree of 26 May 1998, the children of van Vollenhoven bear the surname "van Lippe-Biesterfeld van Vollenhoven", without titles.

Upon the abdication of Queen Beatrix, which took place on 30 April 2013, it was confirmed that the children of Princess Margriet and Pieter van Vollenhoven would no longer be eligible to succeed to the throne, and that they would also cease to be members of the Royal House according to The Membership of the Royal House Act. (Note: The Act specifies that only those within "three degrees of kinship" to the monarch can be in the line of succession.) (Note: The exclusion is not permanent. Princess Margriet would succeed in the unlikely event that the King, the King's daughters, the King's brother Prince Constantijn and his children die or become ineligible to succeed, and her children would be restored to the Royal House and line of succession.)

== Titles and styles ==
- 17 April 1968–present: His Highness Prince Maurits of Orange-Nassau, van Vollenhoven
