= Prince Pieter-Christiaan of Orange-Nassau, van Vollenhoven =

Dutch royal (born 1972)

Prince Pieter-Christiaan
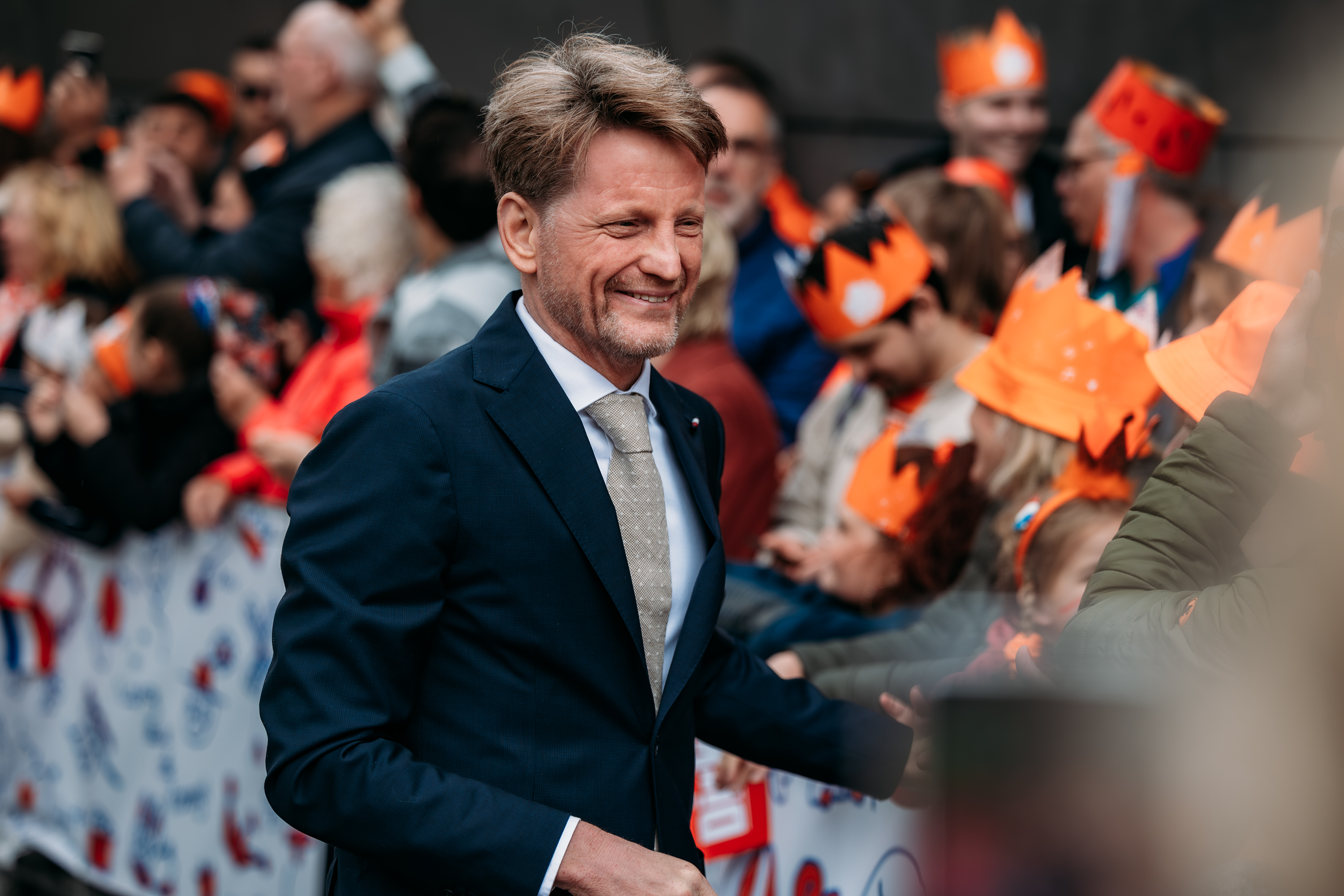
- Pieter-Christiaan in 2024
- Born: 22 March 1972 (age 54); Nijmegen, Netherlands
- Spouse: Anita van Eijk (m. 2005)
- Issue: Emma van Vollenhoven; Pieter van Vollenhoven
Names
- Pieter-Christiaan Michiel
- House: Orange-Nassau
- Father: Pieter van Vollenhoven
- Mother: Princess Margriet of the Netherlands

Prince Pieter-Christiaan Michiel of Orange-Nassau, van Vollenhoven (born 22 March 1972), is the third son of Princess Margriet of the Netherlands and Pieter van Vollenhoven.

Before the succession of his cousin Prince Willem-Alexander as King in 2013, he was a member of the Dutch Royal House and twelfth in line to the throne. With Willem-Alexander's succession however, he is no longer a member of the Dutch Royal House. He is no longer in line to direct succession to the Dutch throne following his marriage without parliamentary approval in 2005, but still retains his membership as a member of the Dutch royal family.

== Education and career ==
Prince Pieter-Christiaan lived during his early years at the estate near the Het Loo Palace in Apeldoorn. He also attended primary school and high school in Apeldoorn. After graduation he did his military conscription at the Royal Marechaussee, where he is still enlisted as a Reserve Lieutenant Colonel. He subsequently obtained his LL.M. degree in law at the Utrecht University in 1999.

Between 2000 and 2003 he worked for Equity Capital Markets in London, which is a joint venture between the ABN AMRO and NM Rothschild.

In autumn 2003 Prince Pieter-Christiaan successfully finished a one-year MBA at the International Institute for Management Development (IMD) in Lausanne, Switzerland. From March 2004 he worked as a marketing strategist for the ICT company Shopservices in Amsterdam. Since 13 September 2004, the prince is working as lieutenant colonel at the Operations Department of the Central Office of the Royal Marechaussee in The Hague.

On 24 July 2010, he was made a Knight of the Order of Saint John in the Netherlands.

In April 2015, Prince Pieter-Christiaan was appointed Chairman of the Advisory Board of CSR and sustainability consultancy EMG Group. Members of the EMG Advisory Board include the former Danish Minister of the Environment Ida Auken MP.

== Marriage and children ==
Royal Standard

He married Anita van Eijk in a civil ceremony on 25 August 2005 at the Het Loo Palace, Apeldoorn, which was followed by a religious ceremony on 27 August 2005 at the Grote of St. Jeroenskerk, currently known as Oude Jeroenskerk, in Noordwijk. Since he did not seek parliamentary approval for his marriage, due to the remote chance of his succession to the throne, Pieter-Christiaan lost his place in the succession to the Dutch throne when he married van Eijk.

On 9 June 2006, Prince Pieter-Christiaan and Princess Anita announced that they were expecting their first child. Anita gave birth to a daughter, Emma Francisca Catharina van Vollenhoven, on 28 November 2006. The baby was born at 6:00 pm at the Onze Lieve Vrouwe Gasthuis in Amsterdam. Like her cousins, the baby was christened in the chapel of Het Loo palace in Apeldoorn, on her parents' wedding anniversary, 25 August 2007. Emma's godparents are her uncle, Prince Bernhard; her aunt, Caroline van der Toorn; Evert-Jan Wamsteker and Countess Alexandra de Witt.

On 15 May 2008, the couple announced that they were expecting their second child by the end of November 2008. Anita gave birth to a son on 19 November 2008. His full name is Pieter Anton Maurits Erik van Vollenhoven. He was born at 1:32 am at the Haaglanden Medical Centre in The Hague. As with his sister and their cousins, he was christened in the chapel of Het Loo palace in Apeldoorn on September 20, 2009. Pieter's godparents were his paternal grandfather Pieter van Vollenhoven, his paternal uncle Prince Maurits, Jonkvrouw Anouk van Door and Sandra Chollet.
