= Onze Lieve Vrouwe Gasthuis =

Hospital in Amsterdam, Netherlands

Coordinates: 52.3583°N 4.9153°E

Our Lady Hospital Onze Lieve Vrouwe Gasthuis
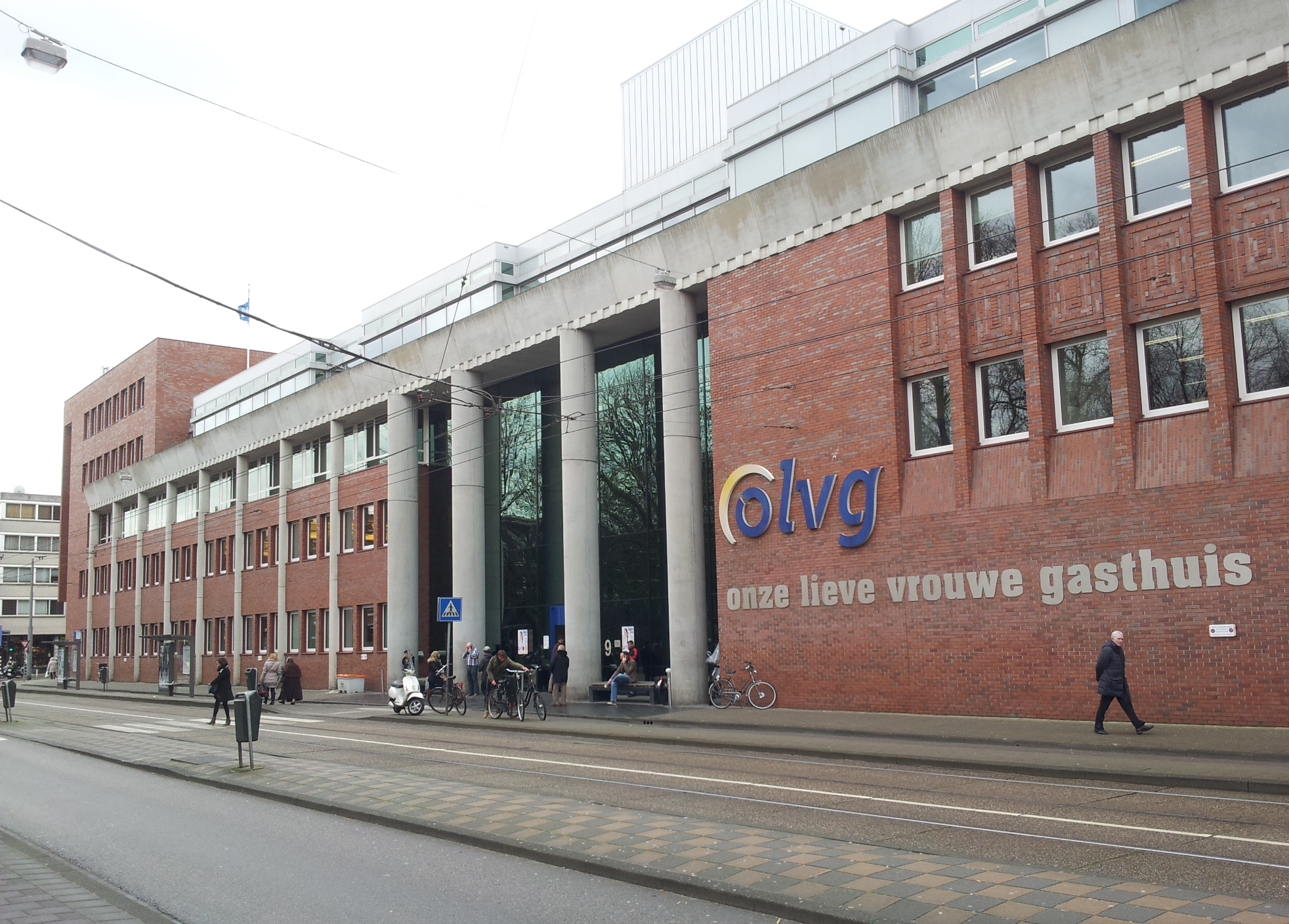

Geography
- Location: Amsterdam, the Netherlands

History
- Opened: 1898

Links
- Website: www.olvg.nl
- Lists: Hospitals in the Netherlands

Onze Lieve Vrouwe Gasthuis (English: "Our Dear Lady Hospital") is a major clinical hospital situated near Oosterpark in Amsterdam in the Netherlands. Founded in 1898, it is now part of OLVG, a network of hospitals formed by the merger of the Onze Lieve Vrouwe Gasthuis with the former Sint Lucas Andreas hospital, and is now known as OLVG, West Location.
