= Dutch royal house =

Royal house of the Kingdom of the Netherlands

In the Kingdom of the Netherlands, the monarchy of the Netherlands is a constitutional office and is controlled by the Constitution of the Netherlands. A distinction is made between members of the Dutch royal family as a whole and members of the royal house in particular. Both the royal house and the larger royal family are part of the Orange-Nassau dynasty.

== Membership ==
According to the Membership to the Royal House Act, which was revised in 2002, the members of the royal house are:

- the monarch (king or queen) as head of the royal house;
- the members of the royal family in the line of succession to the Dutch throne, but limited to two degrees of kinship from the current monarch (first degree are parents and second degree are siblings);
- the heir to the throne;
- the former monarch (upon abdication);
- the members of the royal house of further degrees of kinship if they: were already members of the royal house prior to the revision of the act in 2002, were adults at the time, and remain in the direct line of succession;
- the spouses of the above;
- the widows and widowers of the above, provided that they do not remarry and that their spouses would still qualify if they were alive today.

=== Current members ===
- The King (King Willem-Alexander), the current head of the royal house; eldest child of Queen Beatrix
- The Queen (Queen Máxima), wife of the King
  - The Princess of Orange (Catharina-Amalia), eldest child of the King and Queen
  - Princess Alexia, middle child of the King and Queen
  - Princess Ariane, youngest child of the King and Queen
- Princess Beatrix, formerly Queen Beatrix
  - Prince Constantijn, third and youngest child of Queen Beatrix
  - Princess Laurentien, wife of Prince Constantijn
- Princess Margriet, sister of Queen Beatrix; an exception was made for her when the act was revised
- Pieter van Vollenhoven, husband of Princess Margriet

=== Loss of membership ===
The membership ends if the right to succeed to the Dutch throne is lost, e.g. by marrying without parliament’s approval. This applied to several members of the royal family:

- in 1964, Princess Irene married Carlos Hugo, Duke of Parma
- in 1975, Princess Christina married Jorge Guillermo
- in 2004, Prince Friso married Mabel Wisse Smit; the government declined to ask official parliamentary permission for the marriage
- in 2005, Prince Pieter-Christiaan married Anita van Eijk
- in 2005, Prince Floris married Aimée Söhngen

In addition, membership is lost when a person, who was formerly a member, loses the direct right to succession because he or she is no longer related to the current monarch within three degrees of kinship. When King Willem-Alexander assumed the throne in 2013, this applied to:

- Prince Maurits and his wife Princess Marilène
- Prince Bernhard and his wife Princess Annette

Membership is also lost when a person is still in the direct line of succession but is no longer related to the current monarch within two degrees of kinship. When King Willem-Alexander assumed the throne in 2013, this applied to:

- Countess Eloise of Orange-Nassau van Amsberg
- Count Claus-Casimir of Orange-Nassau van Amsberg
- Countess Leonore of Orange-Nassau van Amsberg

All children of Prince Constantijn and Princess Laurentien
