= Countess Eloise of Orange-Nassau =

Dutch noble (born 2002)

Eloise van Oranje-Nassau van Amsberg
- Countess of Orange-Nassau; Jonkvrouwe van Amsberg
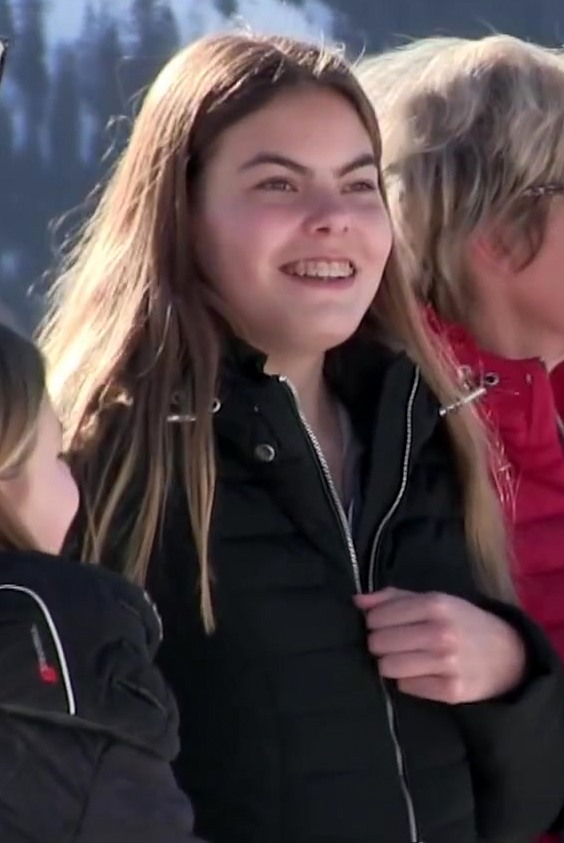
- Countess Eloise in 2019
- Born: 8 June 2002 (age 24); HMC Bronovo, The Hague, Netherlands
Names
- Eloise Beatrix Sophie Laurence van Oranje-Nassau van Amsberg
- Royal family: Orange-Nassau (official); Amsberg (agnatic)
- Father: Prince Constantijn of the Netherlands
- Mother: Laurentien Brinkhorst

TikTok information
- Page: eloise
- Followers: 299.2K
- Last updated: 6 July 2026

Countess Eloise of Orange-Nassau, Jonkvrouwe van Amsberg (Eloise Beatrix Sophie Laurence; born 8 June 2002), in the media often styled as simply Eloise van Oranje, is the first child and daughter of Prince Constantijn and Princess Laurentien of the Netherlands. She is the first grandchild of Queen Beatrix and Prince Claus of the Netherlands, as well as the only one to be born in Prince Claus' lifetime. She is a member of the Dutch royal family and currently fifth in the line of succession to the Dutch throne.

== Life ==
Countess Eloise was born in HMC Bronovo Hospital in The Hague.

The christening of Countess Eloise took place in the chapel of Het Loo Palace in Apeldoorn on 15 December 2002. Her godparents were Crown Prince Haakon of Norway, Prince Friso of Orange-Nassau, Princess Carolina de Bourbon de Parme, and Sophie van de Wouw.

In 2021, she wrote a book, Learning by Doing, about her experience of sharing on social media, covering topics such as clothing, student life, food, styling and self-confidence tips. She also appeared as a contestant on the Dutch television show The Masked Singer in 2024, performing under the mask as “Wolf”.

She has a public Instagram account with more than 400k followers. She is also a TikTok content creator, and raised money for people on the Gaza Strip using the platform.

In December 2024, her home in Amsterdam was burgled.

== Style, titles and names ==
By royal decree of 11 May 2001 (nr. 227), it was determined that the children born from the marriage of Prince Constantijn and Princess Laurentien of the Netherlands would bear the title Count/Countess of Orange‑Nassau and the honorific Jonkheer/Jonkvrouwe van Amsberg with the surname Van Oranje-Nassau van Amsberg.

Upon the abdication of Queen Beatrix, which took place on 30 April 2013, the children of Prince Constantijn and Princess Laurentien ceased to be members of the royal house, although they continue to be members of the royal family.

Countess Eloise of Orange-Nassau House of Orange-Nassau Cadet branch of the House of Nassau Born: 8 June 2002
Lines of succession
| Preceded by Prince Constantijn of the Netherlands | Line of succession to the Dutch throne 5th position | Succeeded by Count Claus-Casimir of Orange-Nassau |
