= Brinkhorst =

Brinkhorst is a Dutch surname. Notable people with the surname include:

- Princess Laurentien of the Netherlands (born 1966), born Laurentien Brinkhorst
- Laurens-Jan Brinkhorst (born 1937), Dutch politician, father of Laurentien
