= Beatrix of the Netherlands =

Queen of the Netherlands from 1980 to 2013

Beatrix
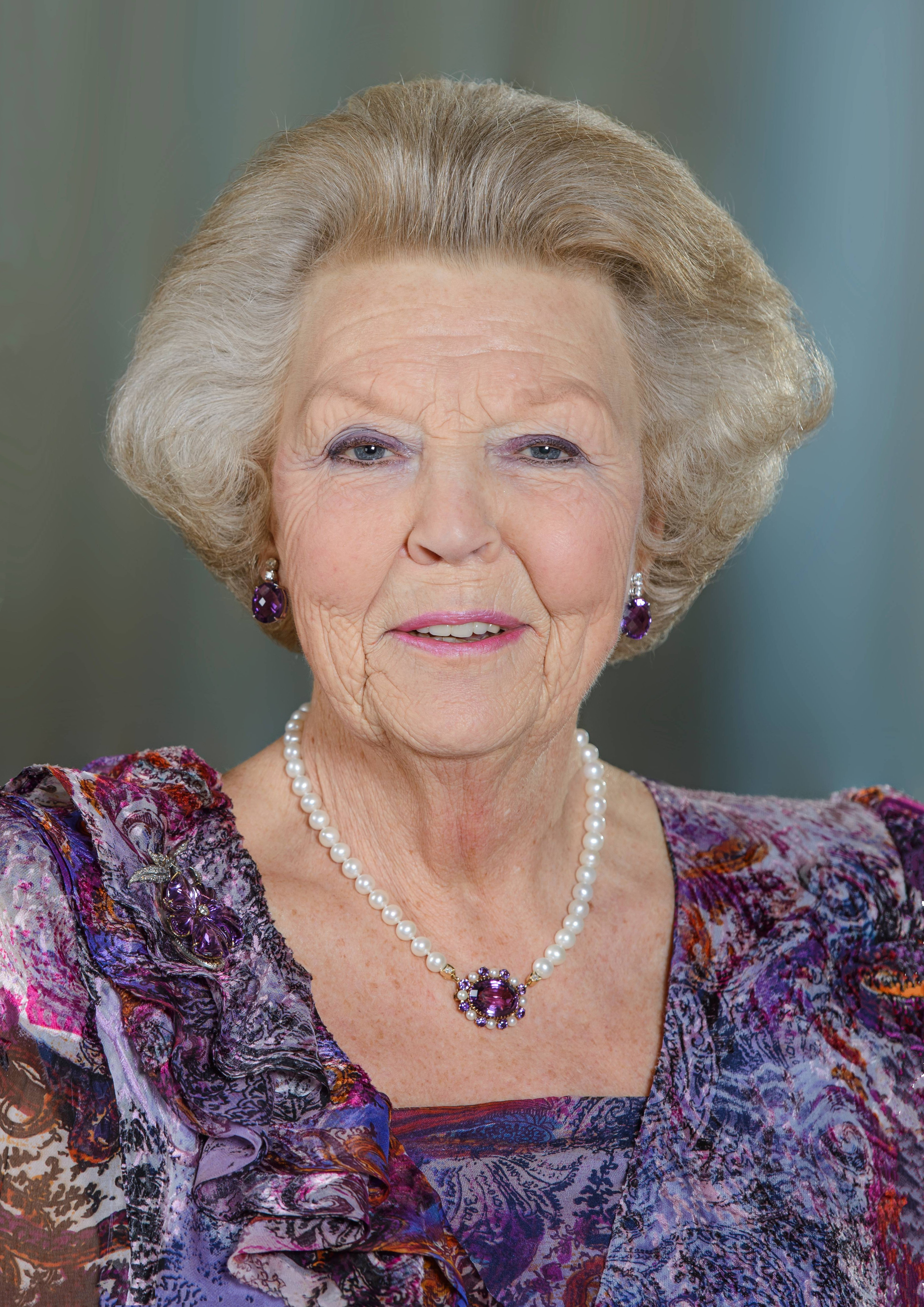
- Formal portrait, 2015

Queen of the Netherlands
- Reign: 30 April 1980 – 30 April 2013
- Inauguration: 30 April 1980
- Predecessor: Juliana
- Successor: Willem-Alexander
- Born: 31 January 1938 (age 88); Soestdijk Palace, Baarn, Netherlands
- Spouse: Claus von Amsberg (m. 1966; died 2002)
- Issue: Willem-Alexander of the Netherlands; Prince Friso; Prince Constantijn
Names
- Beatrix Wilhelmina Armgard
- House: Orange-Nassau (official); Lippe (agnatic)
- Father: Prince Bernhard of Lippe-Biesterfeld
- Mother: Juliana of the Netherlands
- Religion: Protestant (Note: Specifically, a member of the Protestant Church in the Netherlands; previously a member of the Dutch Reformed Church before its 2004 merger.)

Beatrix (Beatrix Wilhelmina Armgard, Dutch pronunciation: [ˈbeːjaːtrɪks ˌʋɪlɦɛlˈminaː ˈʔɑr(ə)mɡɑrt]; born 31 January 1938) is a member of the Dutch royal house who reigned as Queen of the Netherlands from 30 April 1980 until her abdication in 2013.

Beatrix was born during the reign of her maternal grandmother, Queen Wilhelmina, and became heiress presumptive upon the accession of her mother, Queen Juliana, in 1948. Beatrix attended a public primary school in Canada during World War II, and then finished her primary and secondary education in the Netherlands in the post-war period. In 1961, she received her law degree from Leiden University. In 1966, Beatrix married Claus von Amsberg, a German diplomat, with whom she had three children. When her mother abdicated on 30 April 1980, Beatrix succeeded her as queen.

Beatrix's reign saw the country's Caribbean territories reshaped with Aruba's secession and becoming its own constituent country within the kingdom in 1986. This was followed by the dissolution of the Netherlands Antilles in 2010, which created the new special municipalities of Bonaire, Sint Eustatius, and Saba, and the two new constituent countries of Curaçao and Sint Maarten.

On Koninginnedag (Queensday), 30 April 2013, Beatrix abdicated in favour of her eldest son, Willem-Alexander, who became the first male monarch of the Netherlands since the death of William III in 1890. At the time of her abdication at age 75, Beatrix was the oldest reigning monarch in the country's history.

== Early life ==
Princess Beatrix Wilhelmina Armgard was born on 31 January 1938 at Soestdijk Palace in Baarn, Netherlands, as the first child of Princess Juliana of the Netherlands and her husband, Prince Bernhard of Lippe-Biesterfeld. Beatrix was baptised on 12 May 1938 in the Great Church in The Hague. Her five godparents were King Leopold III of Belgium; Princess Alice, Countess of Athlone; Beatrix's maternal great-great-aunt Elisabeth, Princess of Erbach-Schönberg; her paternal great-uncle Duke Adolf Friedrich of Mecklenburg; and Countess Allene de Kotzebue. Beatrix's middle names are the first names of her grandmothers, Queen Wilhelmina of the Netherlands and Armgard, Princess of Lippe-Biesterfeld.

When Beatrix was one year old, in 1939, her younger sister Princess Irene was born.

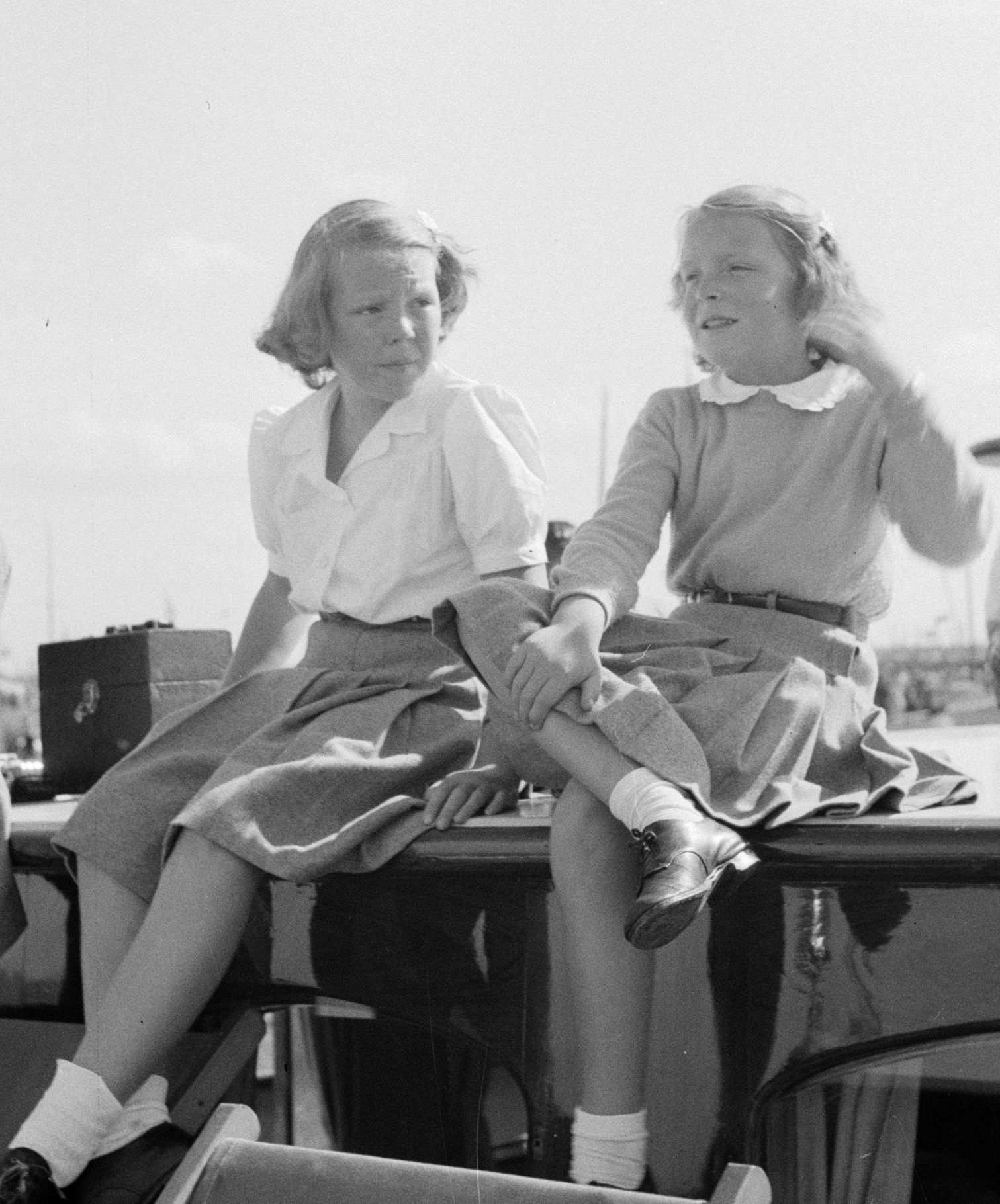
Beatrix and Irene on board the Piet Hein in 1946

World War II broke out in the Netherlands on 10 May 1940 (Westfeldzug). On 13 May, the Dutch Royal Family evacuated to London, United Kingdom. One month later, Beatrix went to Ottawa, Ontario, Canada, with her mother Juliana and her sister Irene, while her father Bernhard and maternal grandmother Queen Wilhelmina remained in London. The family lived at the Stornoway residence (now the residence of the Leader of the Opposition in the Parliament of Canada). With bodyguards and ladies in waiting, the family summered at Bigwin Inn on Lake of Bays, Ontario, where four private stone cottages of the resort served as their retreat. While on Bigwin Island, the constitution of the Netherlands was stored in the safe of Bigwin Inn's rotunda building. Princess Juliana and her family were remembered for their "down to earth" friendliness, general gratefulness and great reverence for their homeland and people, to whom they paid homage by refraining from all luxuries offered to guests at the resort that was once billed as the largest and most luxurious summer resort in Canada. To provide them with a greater sense of security, culinary chefs and staff catered to personal orders at meal time. Upon their departure, the hotel musicians of the Bigwin Inn Orchestra assembled dockside; and at every public performance afterward through to the end of World War II, the Wilhelmus was played. In the years following the shuttering and neglect of the island resort, the "Juliana" cottages were well maintained and preserved in an informal tribute to Princess Juliana and her family. In appreciation for the protection of her and her daughters, Princess Juliana established the custom of delivery to the Canadian government every spring of tulips, which is the centrepiece of the Canadian Tulip Festival.

The second sister of Beatrix, Princess Margriet, was born in Ottawa in 1943. During their exile in Canada, Beatrix attended nursery and Rockcliffe Park Public School, a primary school where she was known as "Trixie Orange".

On 5 May 1945, the German troops in the Netherlands surrendered. The family returned to the Netherlands on 2 August 1945. Beatrix went to the progressive primary school De Werkplaats in Bilthoven run by pacifist social reformers Kees Boeke and Beatrice Boeke-Cadbury. Her third sister Princess Christina was born in 1947. On 6 September 1948, her mother succeeded her grandmother Wilhelmina as Queen of the Netherlands. Since she had no brothers, Beatrix became the heiress presumptive to the Dutch throne at the age of ten.

== Education ==
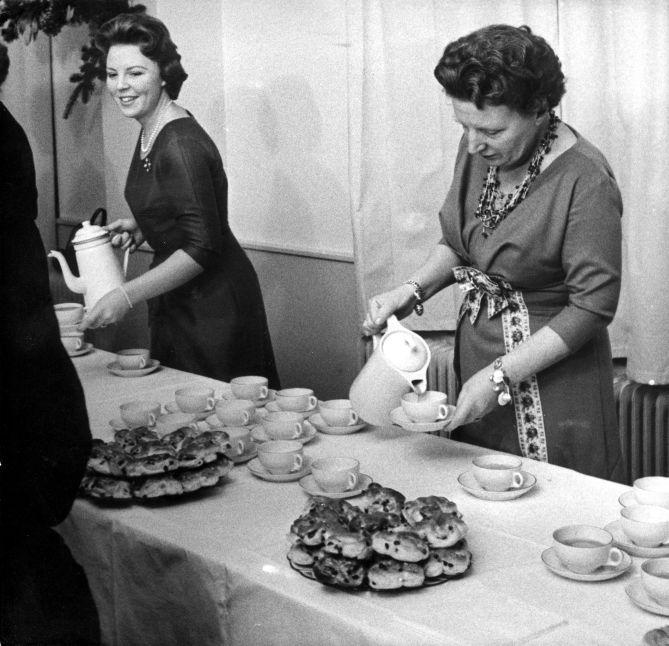
Princess Beatrix and Queen Juliana in 1960

In April 1950, Princess Beatrix entered the Incrementum, a part of Baarnsch Lyceum, where, in 1956, she passed her school graduation examinations in the subjects of arts and classics. Her tutor from April 1951 was Gertrude Büringh Boekhoudt, who remained a close confidant until her death in 1982.

In 1954, Beatrix served as a bridesmaid at the wedding of Baroness van Randwijck and Mr. T Boey.

On 31 January 1956, Beatrix celebrated her 18th birthday. From that date, under the Constitution of the Netherlands, she was entitled to assume the Royal Prerogative. At that time, her mother installed her in the Council of State.

The same year her studies at Leiden University began. In her first years at the university, she studied sociology, jurisprudence, economics, parliamentary history and constitutional law. In the course of her studies she also attended lectures on the cultures of Suriname and the Netherlands Antilles, the Charter for the Kingdom of the Netherlands, international affairs, international law, history and European law.

The princess also visited various European and international organisations in Geneva, Strasbourg, Paris, and Brussels. She was also an active member of the VVSL (Female Union for Students in Leiden), now called L.S.V. Minerva, after merging with the Leidsch Studenten Corps (which before then was male-only). In the summer of 1959, she passed her preliminary examination in law, and she obtained her law degree in July 1961.

== Political involvement ==
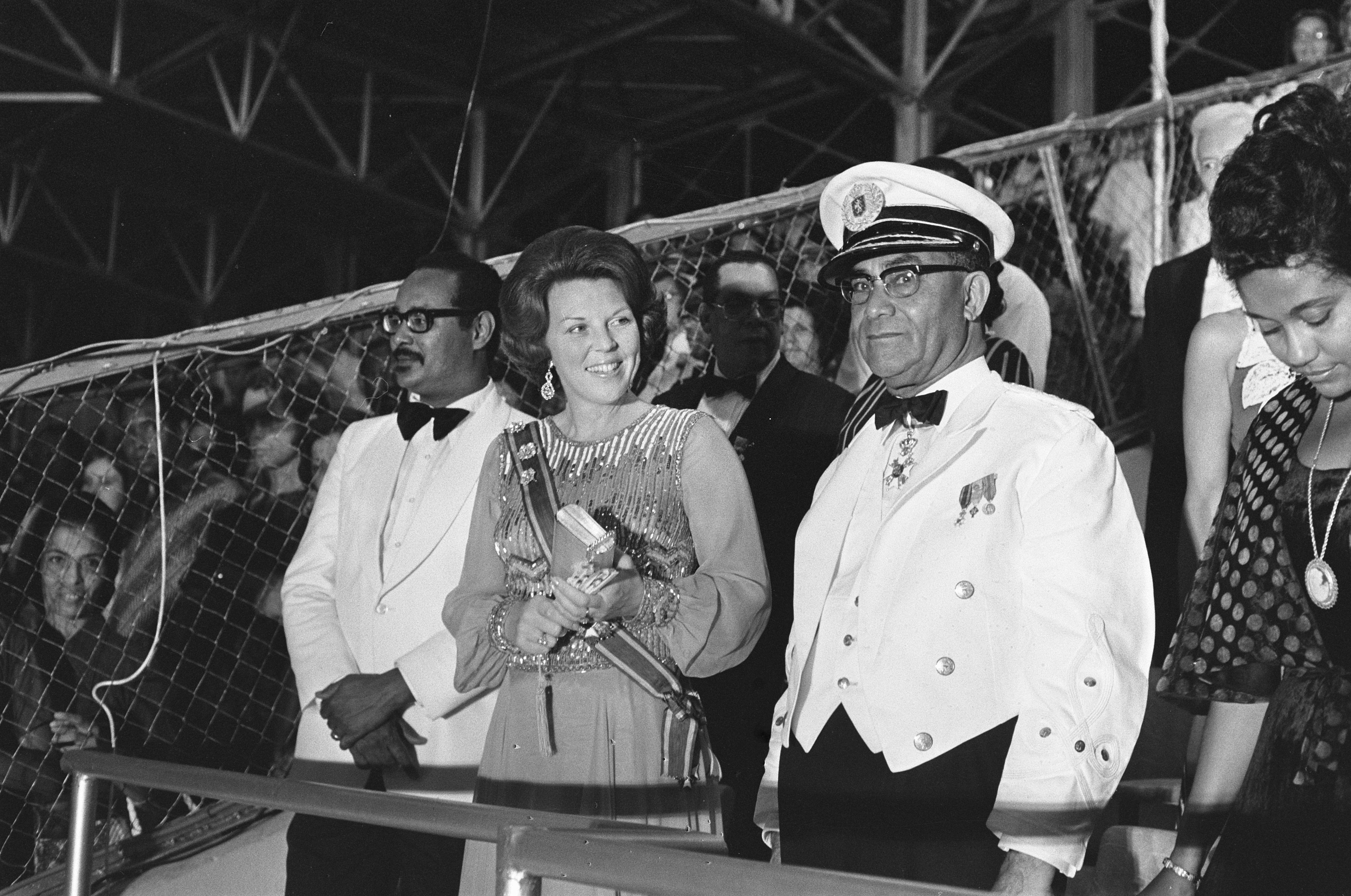
Henck Arron, Princess Beatrix, and Johan Ferrier during the independence ceremony of Suriname in 1975

In 1965, Beatrix became engaged to the German aristocrat Claus von Amsberg, a diplomat working for the German Foreign Office. There was a massive protest on their wedding day in Amsterdam on 10 March 1966. Prince Claus had served in the Hitler Youth and the Wehrmacht and therefore was easily associated with German Nazism. Protests included slogans like "Claus 'raus!" (Claus out!) and "Mijn fiets terug" ("Return my bicycle" – a reference to German soldiers confiscating Dutch bicycles during WWII). A group of Provos threw a smoke bomb at the Golden Coach, resulting in a street battle with the police.

As time went on, Prince Claus became one of the most popular members of the Dutch monarchy.

On 25 November 1975, Beatrix and Prince Claus attended the independence ceremony of Suriname, held in the new nation's capital, Paramaribo, representing her mother the Queen.

As a monarch, Beatrix had weekly meetings with the prime minister. She signed all new Acts of Parliament and royal decrees, and until a constitutional change late in her reign, appointed the informateur, an official who is responsible for chairing coalition talks in the formation of new governments. At the state opening of parliament each September, she made a Speech from the Throne, in which the government announced its plans for the coming parliamentary year. As Queen, she was president of the Council of State. Her role was largely ceremonial and as a focus of national unity, she did not make legislative or executive decisions.

Beatrix is a member of the Bilderberg Group.

== Marriage and children ==
=== Engagement to Claus ===
On 28 June 1965, the engagement of Princess Beatrix to the German diplomat Claus von Amsberg was announced. Claus and Beatrix had met at the wedding-eve party of Princess Tatjana of Sayn-Wittgenstein-Berleburg and Moritz, Landgrave of Hesse, in summer 1964. After Parliament consented to the marriage, Claus von Amsberg became a Dutch citizen, and upon his marriage became Prince Claus of the Netherlands, Jonkheer van Amsberg.

=== Wedding, 1966 ===
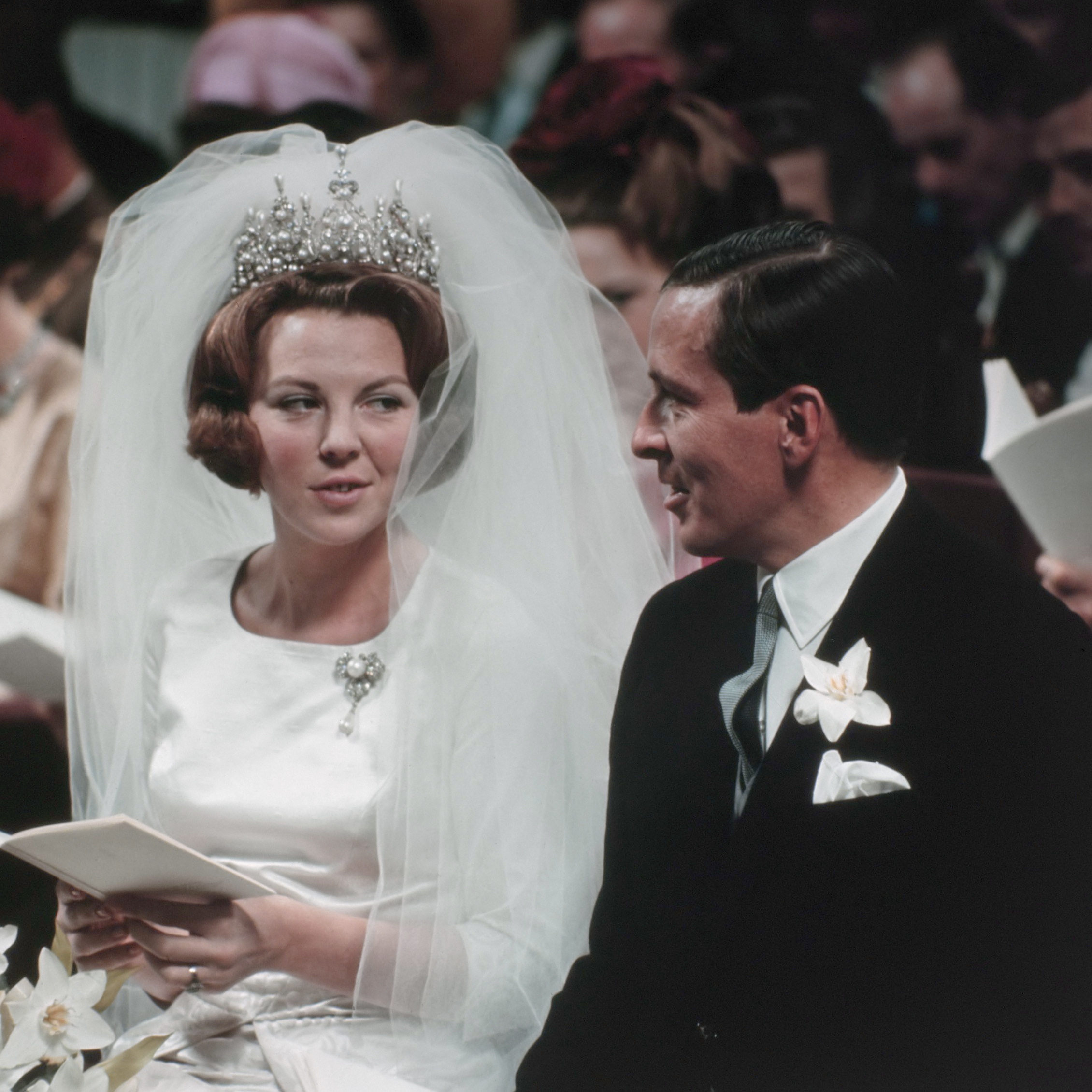
Wedding day, 1966

Beatrix married Claus von Amsberg on 10 March 1966 in civil and religious ceremonies. The bride wore a traditional gown with train in duchesse silk satin, designed by Caroline Bergé-Farwick of Maison Linette, in Den Bosch, and the Württemberg Ornate Pearl Tiara. The senior bridesmaids were the bride's youngest sister, Princess Christina of the Netherlands; Princess Christina of Sweden; Lady Elizabeth Anson; Joanna Roëll; Eugénie Loudon; and the bridegroom's sister, Christina von Amsberg. The junior bridesmaids were Daphne Stewart-Clark and Carolijn Alting von Geusau, with page boys Joachim Jencquel and Markus von Oeynhausen-Sierstorpff.

The royal couple travelled to the ceremony together in the gold state carriage. The civil ceremony was conducted by the Mayor of Amsterdam, Gijsbert van Hall, at Amsterdam City Hall. The marriage blessing took place in the Westerkerk, conducted by the Rev. Hendrik Jan Kater, with a sermon by the Rev. Johannes Hendrik Sillevis Smitt.

=== Children ===
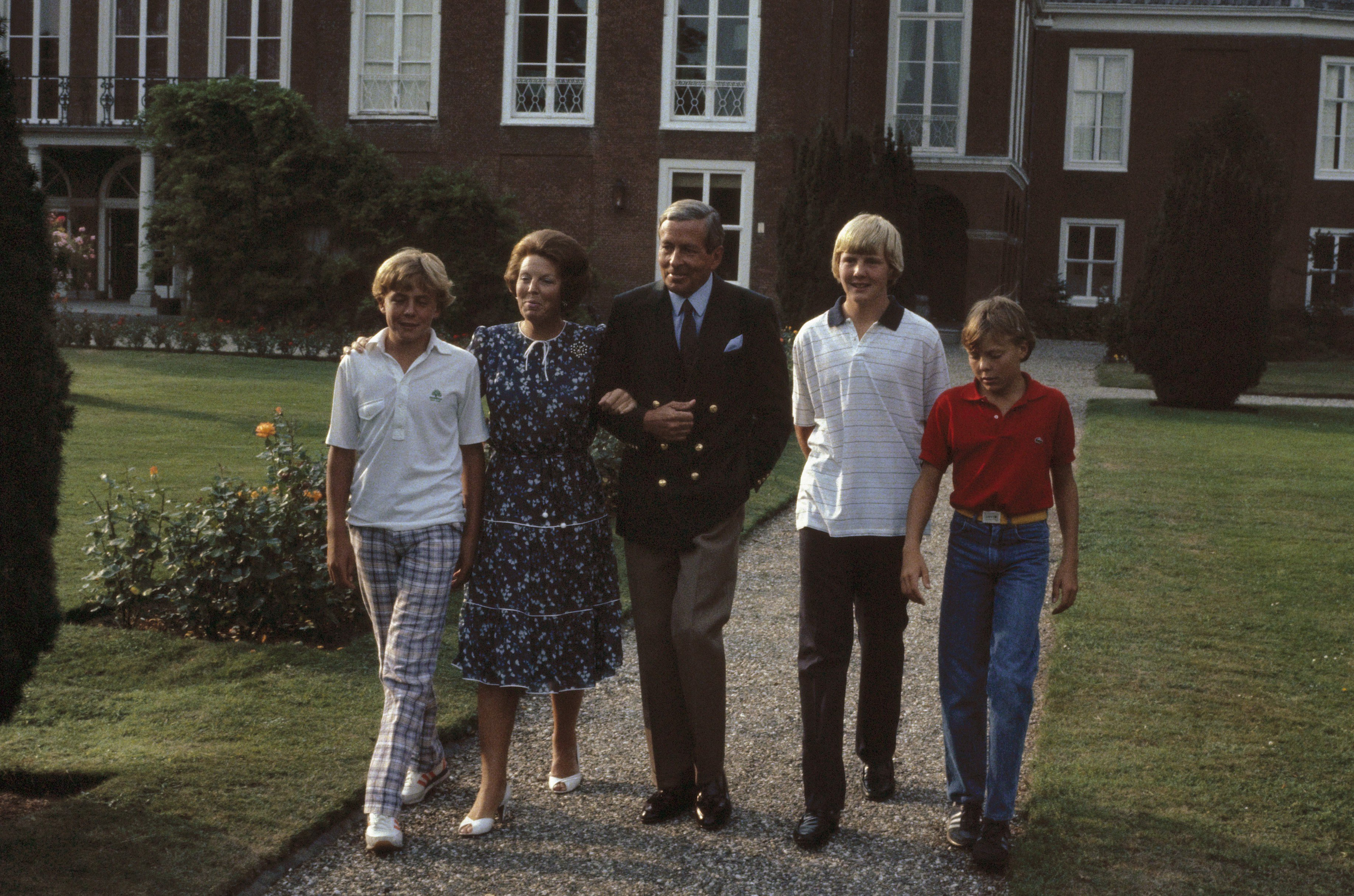
Beatrix and Claus with their children, 1983

The royal couple had three sons. They lived at Drakensteyn Castle in Lage Vuursche with their children until Beatrix ascended the throne. In 1981, they moved into Huis ten Bosch Palace in The Hague.

| Name | Birth | Death | Marriage | | |
| Name | Birth | Death | Date | Spouse | Issue |
|---|---|---|---|---|---|
| Willem-Alexander of the Netherlands | 27 April 1967 | | 2 February 2002 | Máxima Zorreguieta Cerruti | Catharina-Amalia, Princess of Orange; Princess Alexia of the Netherlands; Princess Ariane of the Netherlands |
| Prince Friso of Orange-Nassau | 25 September 1968 | 12 August 2013 | 24 April 2004 | Mabel Wisse Smit | Countess Luana of Orange-Nassau; Countess Zaria of Orange-Nassau |
| Prince Constantijn of the Netherlands | 11 October 1969 | | 19 May 2001 | Laurentien Brinkhorst | Countess Eloise of Orange-Nassau; Count Claus-Casimir of Orange-Nassau; Countess Leonore of Orange-Nassau |

== Accession and inauguration ==
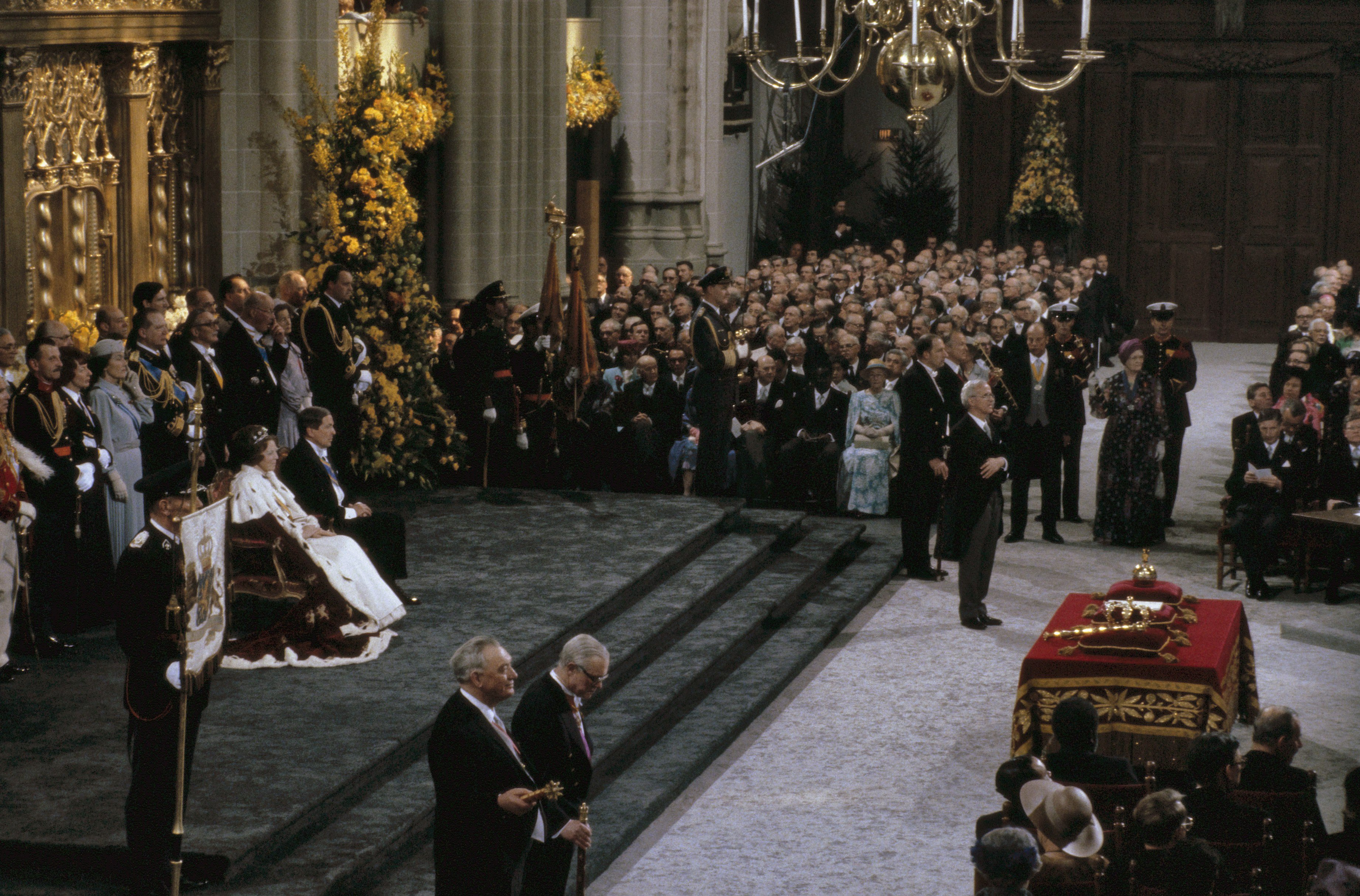
Queen Beatrix swearing the royal oath during her Inhuldiging

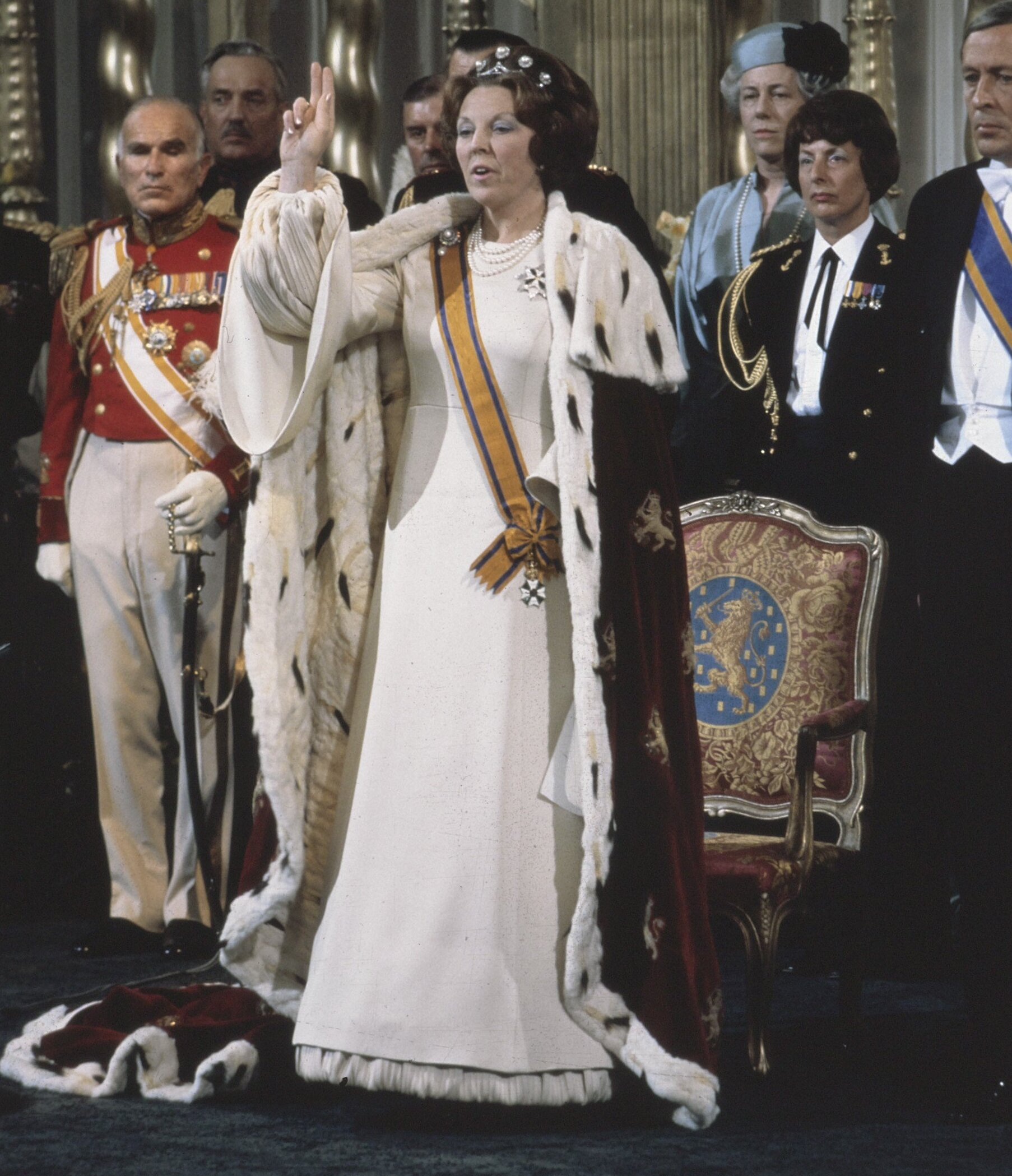
Beatrix pronounces her Oath in the Nieuwe Kerk, 1980

From the 1970s, Beatrix began to prepare more intensively for her future position as head of state. She made many trips abroad with Prince Claus, including a controversial one to the Soviet Union.

After the Lockheed affair, Beatrix and Claus began to delve into the royal household and made plans to adapt it. In addition, they asked advisers to prepare for Beatrix's reign. On 31 January 1980, the birthday of her eldest daughter and heiress presumptive, Queen Juliana announced during a speech that she wished to abdicate on 30 April in favor of her daughter Beatrix.

That Beatrix would succeed her mother as queen was not a matter of course when she was born. It was not until 1983 that the Constitution was amended in such a way that the eldest child of the head of state becomes the legal heir to the throne. Until then, it had been arranged that the eldest son always had priority over a daughter. It was only after it was clear that Juliana was biologically unable to have any more children, let alone a son, that Beatrix was certain that she was the intended successor.

On 30 April 1980, Juliana abdicated, and Beatrix became the 13th member of the House of Orange to reign over the Netherlands. She was sworn in and inaugurated as monarch during a joint session of the two chambers of the States General at a ceremony held in the Nieuwe Kerk in Amsterdam later that day.

== Reign ==
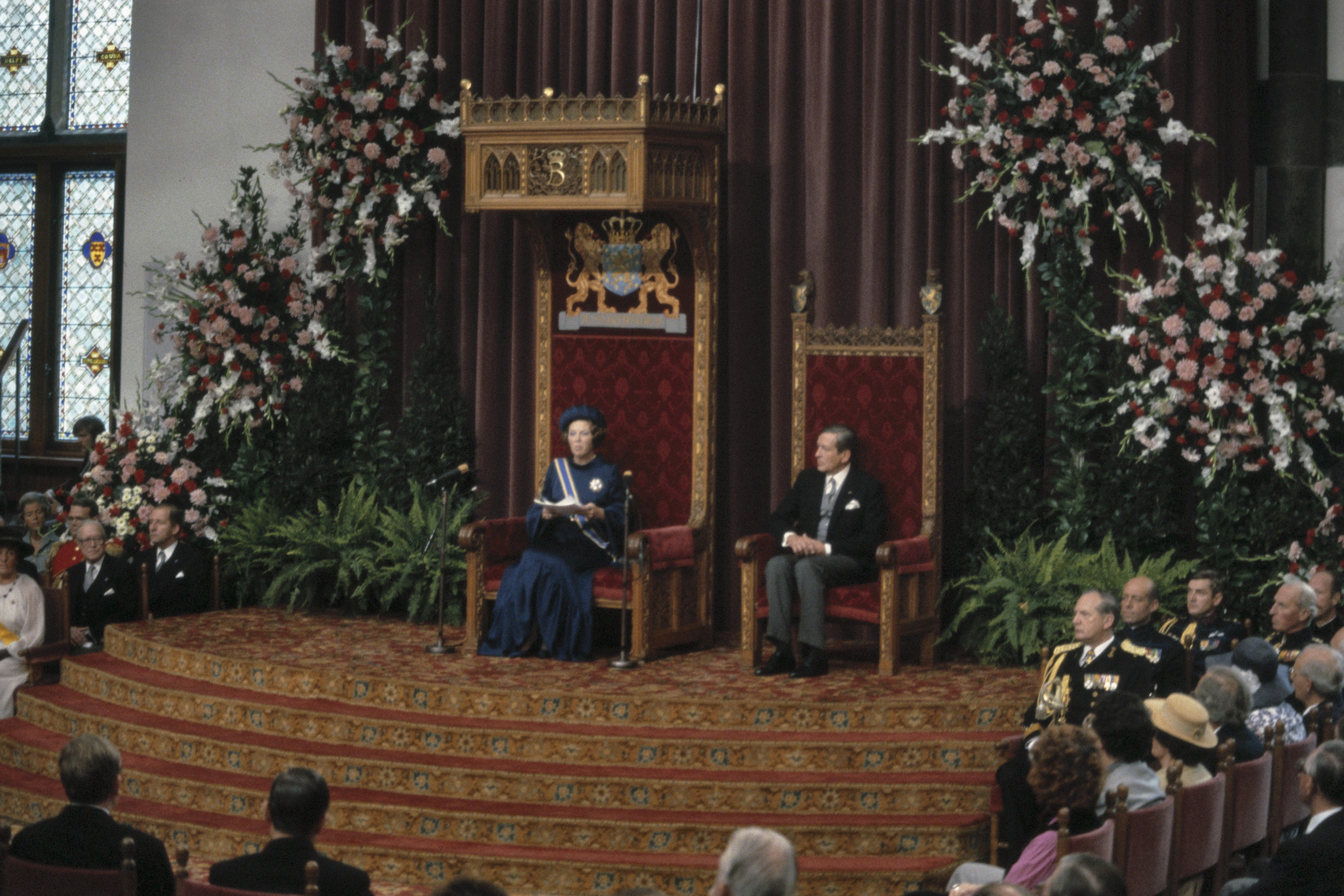
Queen Beatrix delivers her Crown Speech, on the occasion of her first Prinsjesdag as queen (1980).

Beatrix's constitutional duties included those typically accorded to a head of state; this includes having to sign every piece of legislation before it becomes law, formally appointing various officials, receiving and accrediting ambassadors, and awarding honours and medals, among others. Outside of these constitutional duties, her other informal roles included being the highest representative of the kingdom internationally and to be a unifying figure locally.

Beatrix was rarely quoted directly in the press during her reign, for the government information service (Rijksvoorlichtingsdienst) made it a condition of interviews that she should not be quoted. This policy was introduced shortly after her inauguration, reportedly to protect her from political complications that might arise from "off-the-cuff" remarks. It did not apply to her son Prince Willem-Alexander.

Throughout much of her reign, Beatrix had a considerable role in the cabinet formation process; notably she appointed the informateur and formateur, the person who leads the negotiations that ultimately lead to the formation of a government. However, this was changed in 2012, and now the largest party in the States General appoints a "scout" who then appoints an informateur.

Beatrix was included in Andy Warhol's portrait series in 1985 as one of four Reigning Queens, alongside Elizabeth II, Margrethe II of Denmark and Ntfombi of Eswatini.

On 1 January 1986, Aruba seceded from the Netherlands Antilles and became a separate constituent country within the Dutch Kingdom.

=== Kissed by a bystander ===
The picture published on the front page of De Telegraaf, with the headline 'Geef me een zoen, meid' (Dutch: Give me a kiss, girl)

During 1988 Queen's Day, Queen Beatrix was kissed by a bystander, later identified as Maarten Rijkers, when she walked through the crowd of people at a flea market in the Jordaan. When Beatrix walked alongside Rijkers he said "Give me a kiss, girl", after which he gave her a hug and two kisses. It received wide media attention and appeared to be a historic moment. An image of this scene was published in large on the front page of De Telegraaf. Even 25 years later in 2013, NRC Handelsblad wrote an article about it and the impact of it.

The reaction of the Queen was seen by people as very positive and was a boost for her reputation in the "Jordaan" region of Amsterdam. The visit was promoted as a "spontaneous visit" to boost her popularity as she was not very popular in the region. Historian and Dutch royalty watcher J. G. Kikkert said in a lecture that the kiss had been staged, based on what he called "usually very reliable sources". He also noted that although the visit and the kiss might not have been her idea, but that of others, she certainly would have given her approval as she was known not to leave things to chance.

=== Later years ===
On 6 October 2002, the Queen's husband, Prince Claus, died after a long illness. A year and a half later her mother died after long suffering from senile dementia, while her father succumbed to cancer in December 2004.

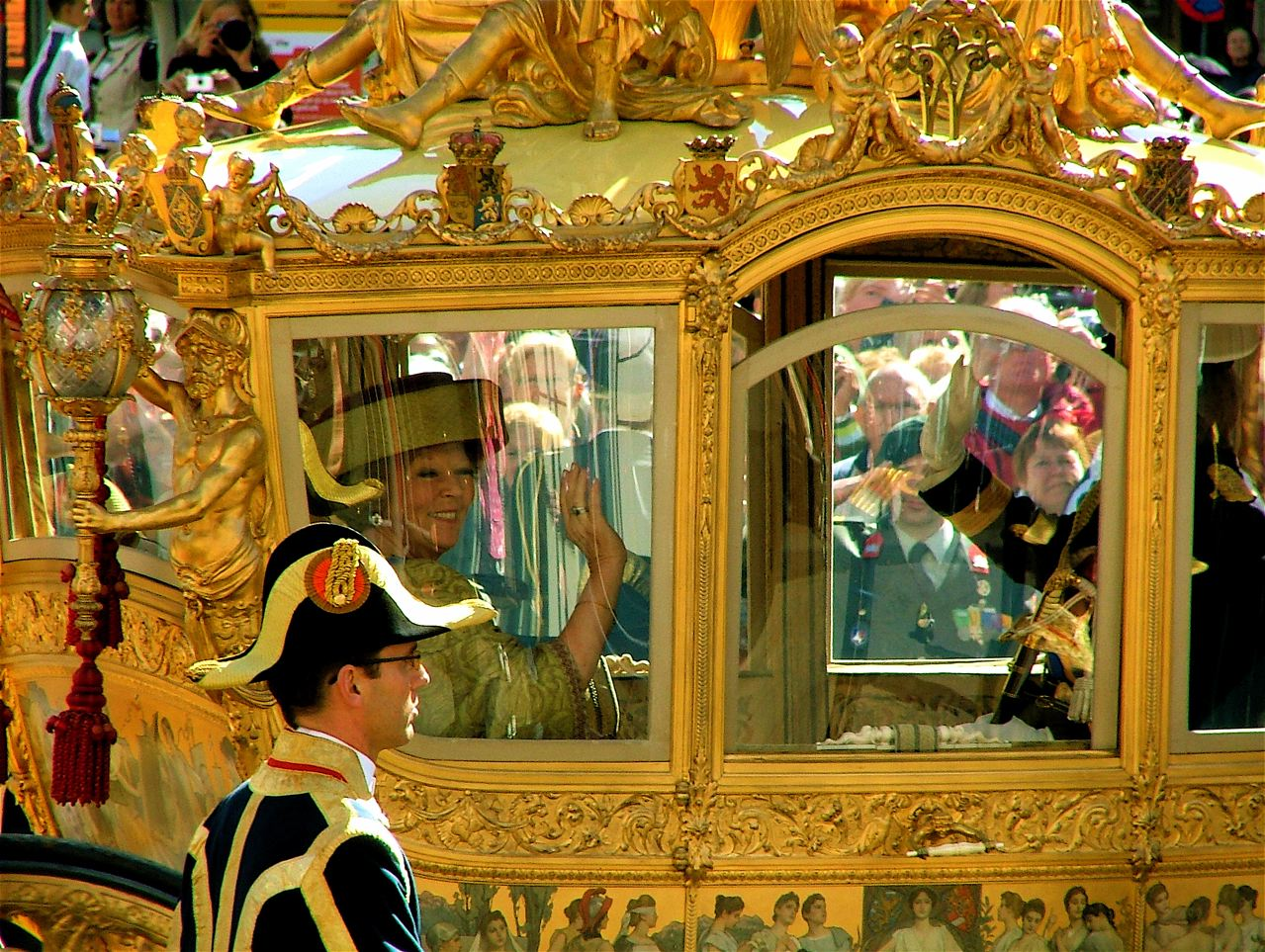
Queen Beatrix and her son, Willem-Alexander in the Golden Coach on Prinsjesdag 2007, the day she gives the annual speech from the throne outlining the government's agenda for the upcoming parliamentary year.

On 8 February 2005, Beatrix received a rare honorary doctorate from Leiden University, an honour the Queen does not usually accept. In her acceptance speech she reflected on the monarchy and her own 25 years as Queen. The speech was broadcast live.

On 29 and 30 April 2005, she celebrated the 25th anniversary of her reign. She was interviewed on Dutch television, was offered a concert on Dam Square in Amsterdam, and a celebration took place in The Hague, the country's seat of government.

On 31 May 2006 the 6th Polish Air Assault Brigade would receive the Militaire Willemsorde der 4e klasse in The Hague. Beatrix was to tie the prestigious medal to the standard of the incumbents of the 1st Independent Polish Parachute Brigade.

In 2009, Forbes estimated her wealth at US$300 million.

On 30 April 2009, Beatrix and other members of the royal family were targeted in a car attack by a man named Karst Tates. He crashed his Suzuki Swift into a parade in Apeldoorn, narrowly missing a bus carrying the Queen, before dying as a result of his injuries. Five people were killed instantly, with two victims also succumbing to their injuries afterward. Other victims of the crash were critically hurt. One week after the attack, another victim succumbed to the injuries he had sustained. The royal party was unharmed, but the Queen and members of her family saw the crash at close range. Within hours, Beatrix made a rare televised address to express her shock and condolences. The man reportedly told police he was deliberately targeting the royal family.

== Abdication ==
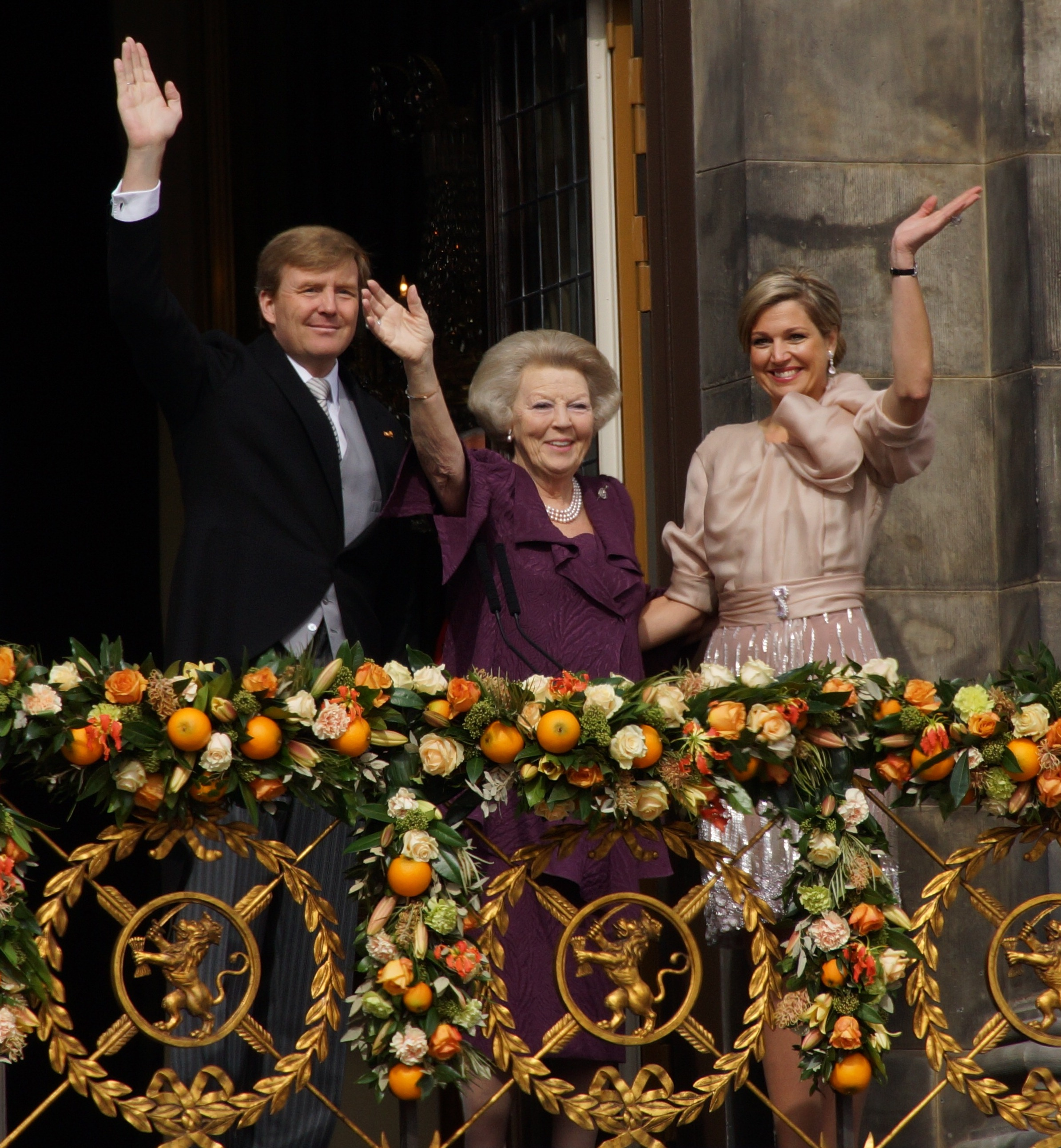
Princess Beatrix, King Willem-Alexander and Queen Máxima waving to crowds during the balcony appearance following her abdication

In a broadcast on national media on 28 January 2013, Beatrix announced her intention to abdicate on 30 April (Koninginnedag), when she would have been on the throne for exactly 33 years. Beatrix stated that it was time to "place the responsibility for the country in the hands of a new generation." Her heir apparent was her eldest son, Prince Willem-Alexander. She was the third successive Dutch monarch to abdicate, following her grandmother and her mother. The broadcast was followed by a statement from Prime Minister Mark Rutte who paid tribute to Beatrix, saying "Since her investiture in 1980, she has applied herself heart and soul to Dutch society."

The royal transition, which included the inauguration of Willem-Alexander as king, took place on 30 April 2013.

== Post-abdication ==
Beatrix continues to undertake some royal duties and is a patron of many organisations. She lives in the small moated Drakensteyn Castle near the village of Lage Vuursche, and a townhouse near Noordeinde Palace. As a result of her abdication, her style and title has reverted to Her Royal Highness Princess Beatrix of the Netherlands.

== Honorific eponyms ==
Beatrix has given her name to a number of facilities in the Netherlands and beyond. These include:

- Streekziekenhuis Koningin Beatrix, regional hospital in Beatrixpark, Winterswijk.
- Queen Beatrix International Airport in Aruba.
- Reina Beatrix School in Aruba.
- Queen Beatrix Hospital Medical Center, Sint Eustatius.
- Queen Beatrix Chair in Dutch Studies at UC Berkeley
- Queen Beatrix Nursing Home, Albion Park Rail, NSW, Australia.

A few parks in the country also bear her name:

- Beatrixpark in the Oud-Zuid neighbourhood in Amsterdam.
- Beatrixpark in Almere.
- Beatrixpark in 's-Hertogenbosch.
- Beatrixpark in Utrecht.
- Beatrixpark in Schiedam.

It has been speculated that Beatrix is De Onbekende Beeldhouwer (Unknown Sculptor), whose work has been appearing in Amsterdam since 1983. There has been no confirmation of this.

== Titles, styles, honours and arms ==
Royal Monogram of Queen Beatrix

- 31 January 1938 – 30 April 1980: Her Royal Highness Princess Beatrix of the Netherlands, Princess of Orange-Nassau, Princess of Lippe-Biesterfeld
- 30 April 1980 – 30 April 2013: Her Majesty The Queen of the Netherlands, Princess of Orange-Nassau, Princess of Lippe-Biesterfeld
- 30 April 2013 – present: Her Royal Highness Princess Beatrix of the Netherlands, Princess of Orange-Nassau, Princess of Lippe-Biesterfeld

Princess Beatrix has held titles throughout her life, as a granddaughter or daughter of a monarch, and eventually as the Sovereign. Beatrix's official title was Her Majesty the Queen of the Netherlands, Princess of Orange-Nassau, etc., etc., etc. The triple etc. refers to the monarch's many dormant titles. She signed official documents with only "Beatrix". In common parlance, she was referred to as The Queen (de koningin or de vorstin) or Her Majesty (Hare Majesteit). But when in conversation with the queen the practice was to initially address her as "Your Majesty" or in Dutch as "Uwe Majesteit" and thereafter as "Mevrouw" (ma'am).

Beatrix has received honours and awards from countries around the world, both during her life as a princess and as a monarch. In her capacity as the Sovereign she was Grand Master of the Military Order of William (Militaire Willemsorde) and the other Dutch orders of merit. She is a Stranger Lady of the Most Noble Order of the Garter and the 1,187th Dame of the Order of the Golden Fleece in Spain, and she has received numerous other medals and decorations.

From birth till her inauguration as queen, she had the following name and titles, to which she reverted after her abdication: Her Royal Highness Princess Beatrix of the Netherlands, Princess of Orange-Nassau, Princess of Lippe-Biesterfeld.

=== Arms ===
Coat of arms of Beatrix of the Netherlands
| Notes As Queen of the Netherlands (1980–2013), Beatrix used the Greater Coat of Arms of the Realm (or "Grote Rijkswapen"). Adopted 30 April 2013 Escutcheon Quarterly, 1 and 3, Azure, billetty Or a lion with a coronet Or armed and langued Gules holding in his dexter paw a sword Argent hilted Or and in the sinister paw seven arrows Argent pointed and bound together Or (royal arms of the Netherlands, i.e. that of her mother, Queen Juliana), 2 and 4, Or, a horn azure, langued gules (arms of the former Principality of Orange), on an inescutcheon argent, a rose gules, seeded vert (arms of the House of Lippe-Biesterfeld, i.e. that of her late father, Prince Bernhard) Banner As Princess, Beatrix used a square and swallow tailed flag, with the Royal standard colours and their maternal arms (the horn of Orange) in the upper hoist and their paternal arms (the rose of Lippe) in the lower hoist. The arms of the Netherlands (which originates from Nassau) without the insignia of the Order of Willem within an orange circle. Previous versions Beatrix as monarch bore the Greater Coat of Arms of the Realm, (or "Grote Rijkswapen"). The components of the coats of arms were regulated by Queen Wilhelmina in a royal decree of 10 July 1907 and were affirmed by Queen Juliana in a royal decree of 23 April 1980: Azure, billetty Or a lion with a coronet Or armed and langued Gules holding in his dexter paw a sword Argent hilted Or and in the sinister paw seven arrows Argent pointed and bound together Or. |

== Prime Ministers during her reign ==
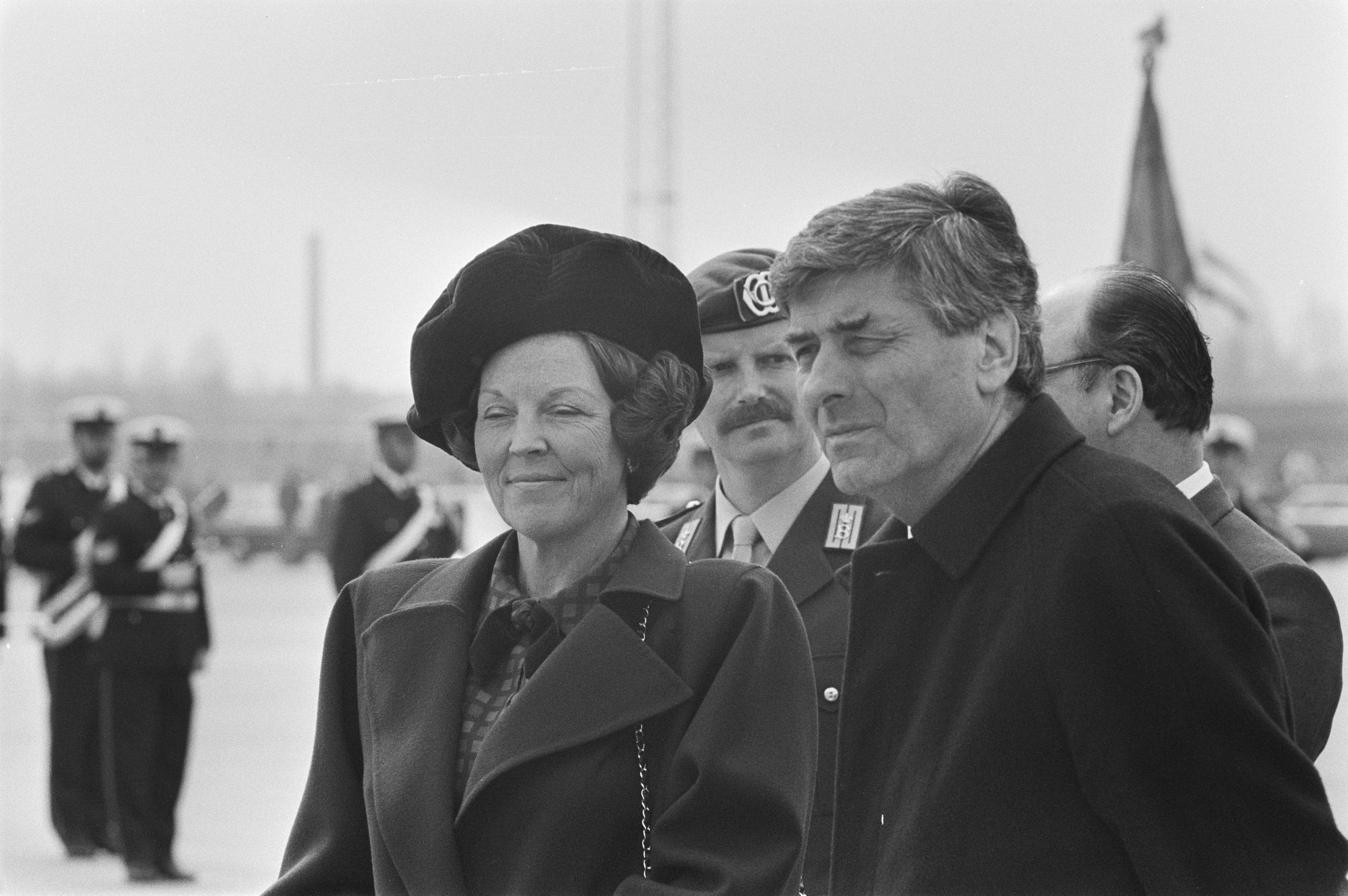
With Prime Minister Ruud Lubbers, 1986

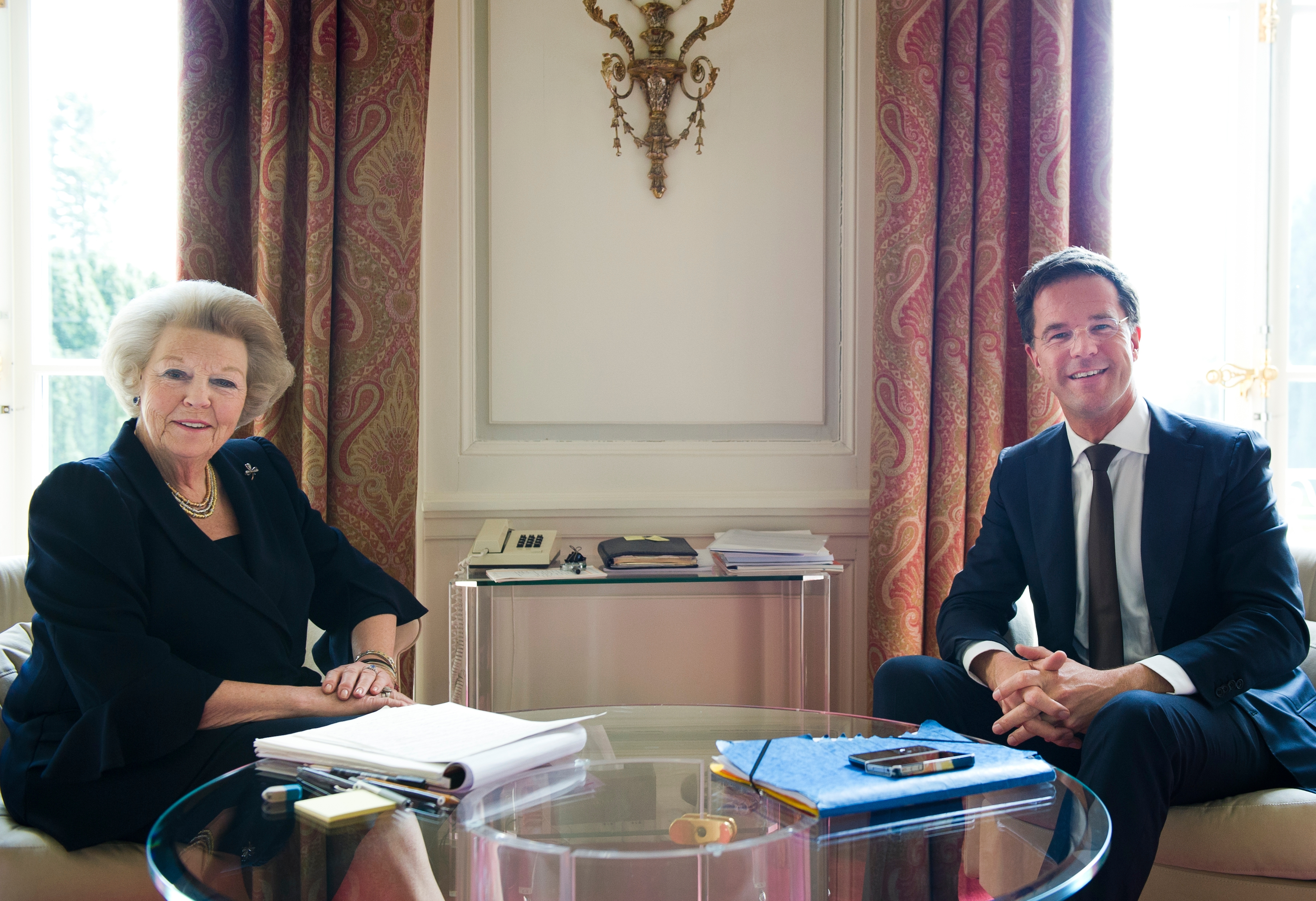
With Prime Minister Mark Rutte, 2013

Prime Ministers during her reign
| Polity | Prime Minister | Start year | End year |
|---|---|---|---|
| Aruba | Henny Eman | 1986 | 1989 |
| Aruba | Nelson O. Oduber | 1989 | 1994 |
| Aruba | Henny Eman | 1994 | 2001 |
| Aruba | Nelson O. Oduber | 2001 | 2009 |
| Aruba | Mike Eman | 2009 | 2013 |
| Netherlands | Dries van Agt | 1977 | 1982 |
| Netherlands | Ruud Lubbers | 1982 | 1994 |
| Netherlands | Wim Kok | 1994 | 2002 |
| Netherlands | Jan Peter Balkenende | 2002 | 2010 |
| Netherlands | Mark Rutte | 2010 | 2013 |
| Netherlands Antilles | Dominico Martina | 1979 | 1984 |
| Netherlands Antilles | Maria Liberia Peters | 1984 | 1986 |
| Netherlands Antilles | Dominico Martina | 1986 | 1988 |
| Netherlands Antilles | Maria Liberia Peters | 1988 | 1993 |
| Netherlands Antilles | Susanne Camelia-Römer | 1993 | |
| Netherlands Antilles | Alejandro Felippe Paula | 1993 | |
| Netherlands Antilles | Miguel Arcangel Pourier | 1994 | 1998 |
| Netherlands Antilles | Susanne Camelia-Römer | 1998 | 1999 |
| Netherlands Antilles | Miguel Arcangel Pourier | 1999 | 2002 |
| Netherlands Antilles | Etienne Ys | 2002 | 2003 |
| Netherlands Antilles | Ben Komproe | 2003 | |
| Netherlands Antilles | Mirna Louisa-Godett | 2003 | 2004 |
| Netherlands Antilles | Etienne Ys | 2004 | 2006 |
| Netherlands Antilles | Emily de Jongh-Elhage | 2006 | 2010 |
| Curaçao | Gerrit Schotte | 2010 | 2012 |
| Curaçao | Stanley Betrian | 2012 | 2012 |
| Curaçao | Daniel Hodge | 2012 | 2013 |
| Sint Maarten | Sarah Wescot-Williams | 2010 | 2013 |

== Books ==
- Oltmans, Willem (25 September 1996). Liegen Tegen Beatrix (PDF). Breda, Netherlands: Papieren Tijger. ISBN 978-90-6728-084-6.

Beatrix of the Netherlands House of Orange-Nassau Born: 31 January 1938
Regnal titles
| Preceded by Juliana | Queen of the Netherlands; 1980–2013 | Succeeded by Willem-Alexander |
Awards
| Preceded by Franz Vranitzky | Recipient of the Charlemagne Prize; 1996 | Succeeded by Roman Herzog |
