= Lage Vuursche =

- Village
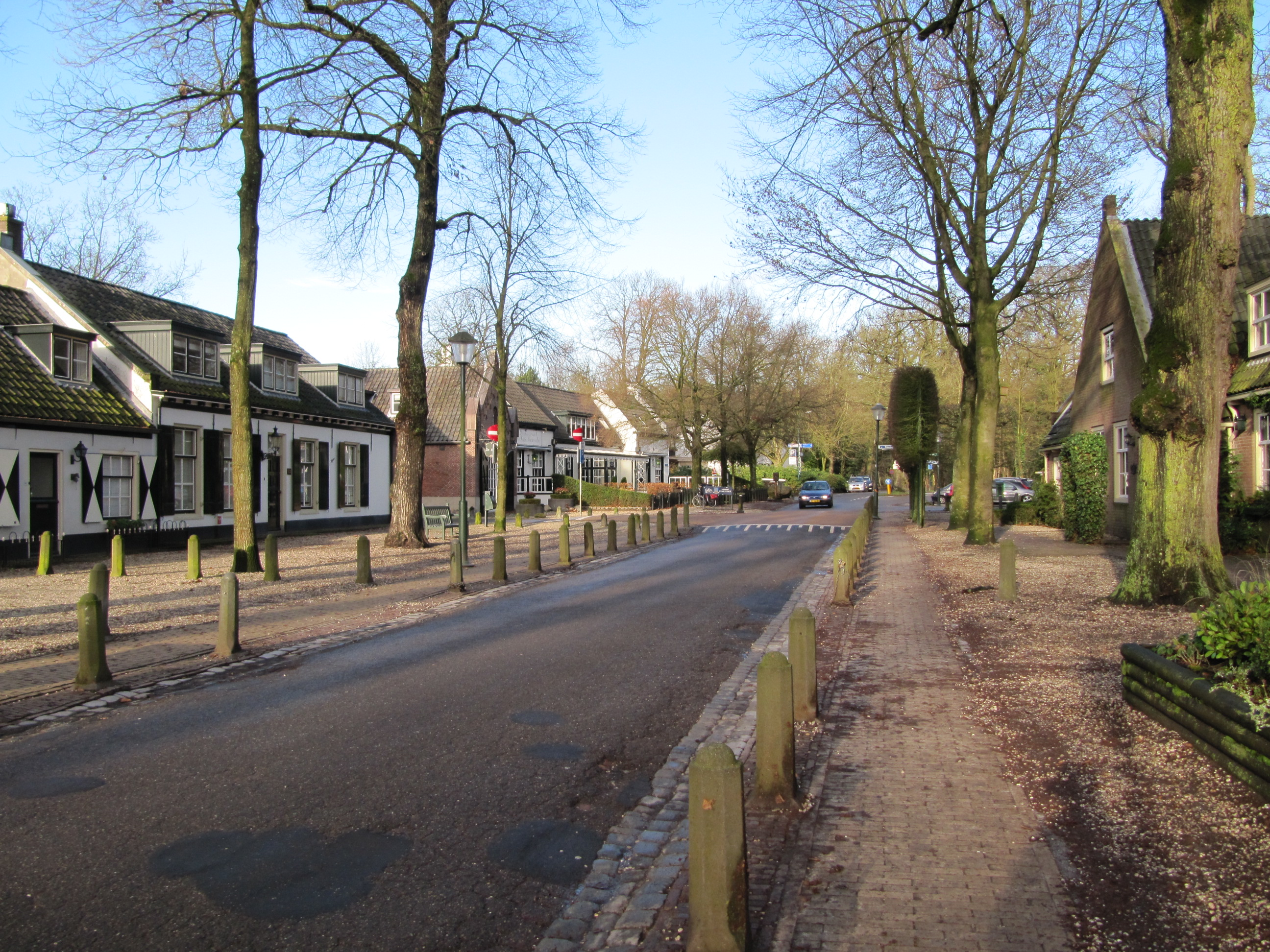
- Lage Vuursche in 2012

- Flag

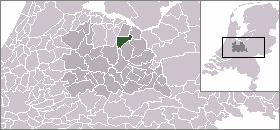
- Location of Baarn in the province of Utrecht

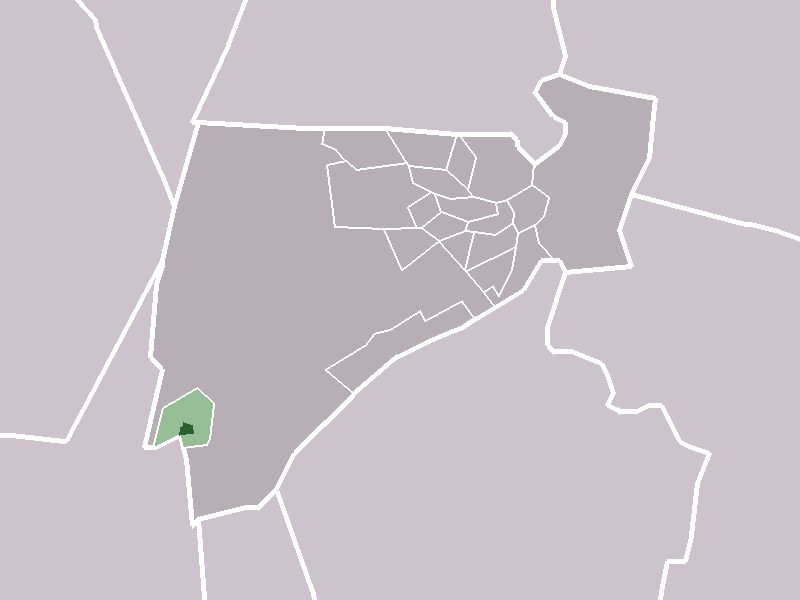
- Location of Lage Vuursche in the municipality of Baarn
- Coordinates: 52°10′45″N 5°13′20″E
- Country: Netherlands
- Province: Utrecht
- Municipality: Baarn

Population (2004)
  - Total: 1,460
- Area code: 035

Lage Vuursche (Dutch pronunciation: [ˈlaːɣə ˈvyːrsə]) is a village in the municipality of Baarn in the Netherlands. It lies about 5 km west of Soest, surrounded by woods, in the province of Utrecht.

In 2001 the village of Lage Vuursche had 139 inhabitants. The built-up area of the town was 0.04 km^{2}, and contained 61 residences. The slightly larger statistical district of Lage Vuursche has about 210 inhabitants.

Until 1857 the village was a separate municipality, under the name De Vuursche, together with the small hamlet Hoge Vuursche. It then merged with the municipality of Baarn.

The castle Drakensteyn, since February 2014 residence again of Princess Beatrix, is situated just east of the village. Her son Prince Friso is buried in the graveyard beside the moated manor.

Apart from the royal family the most famous person from Lage Vuursche is athlete Fanny Blankers-Koen, four times gold medalist in the 1948 Summer Olympics.
