= Prince Friso of Orange-Nassau =

Member of the Dutch Royal family (1968–2013)

Prince Friso
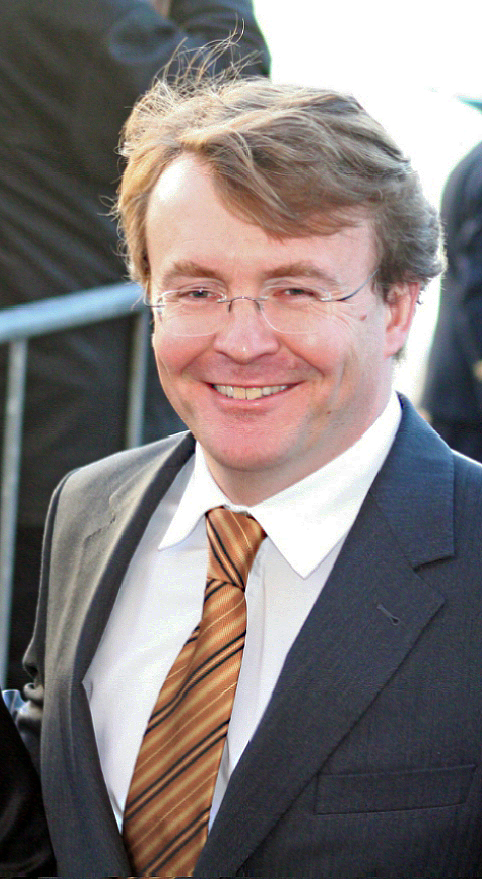
- Friso in 2008
- Born: 25 September 1968; University Medical Center Utrecht, Utrecht, Netherlands
- Died: 12 August 2013 (aged 44); Huis ten Bosch, The Hague, Netherlands
- Burial: 16 August 2013; Dutch Reformed Cemetery, Lage Vuursche, Utrecht, Netherlands
- Spouse: Mabel Wisse Smit (m. 2004)
- Issue: Countess Luana; Countess Zaria
Names
- Johan Friso Bernhard Christiaan David
- House: Orange-Nassau (official); Amsberg (agnatic)
- Father: Claus von Amsberg
- Mother: Beatrix of the Netherlands

Prince Friso of Orange-Nassau (Dutch: Johan Friso Bernhard Christiaan David van Oranje-Nassau van Amsberg; 25 September 1968 – 12 August 2013) was a member of the Dutch royal house and the second son of Queen Beatrix of the Netherlands and Claus von Amsberg, and younger brother of King Willem-Alexander. Friso was a member of the Dutch Royal Family, but because of his marriage without an Act of Consent in 2004, he lost his membership of the Dutch Royal House and was no longer in the line of succession to the throne.

On 17 February 2012, Prince Friso was buried under an avalanche in Lech, Austria, while skiing off piste. He was taken to a hospital in Innsbruck, where he was in a critical but stable condition. According to his doctor, Wolfgang Koller, even though he was trapped for a relatively short time and hopes had originally been higher, subsequent neurological tests showed that after fifty minutes of cardiopulmonary resuscitation in moderate hypothermia, he suffered massive brain damage due to oxygen shortage. His initial coma later progressed to a minimally conscious state, and it was unclear whether he would ever regain full consciousness. On 12 August 2013, one and a half years after the accident, Prince Friso died from complications.

== Early life and education ==
Johan Friso Bernhard Christiaan David was born on 25 September 1968 at the Academic Hospital Utrecht (now the University Medical Center Utrecht) in Utrecht, Netherlands. He was the second son of Princess Beatrix and Prince Claus, and grandson of Queen Juliana of the Netherlands and Prince Bernhard. He had one older brother, current King Willem-Alexander of the Netherlands (b. 1967), and one younger brother, Prince Constantijn (b. 1969).

His titles at birth were Prince of the Netherlands, Prince of Orange-Nassau, and Jonkheer van Amsberg. Prince Friso was baptized on 28 December 1968 in the Dom Church in Utrecht. His godparents were Prince Harald of Norway, Johan Christian Baron von Jenisch, Herman van Roijen, Queen Juliana of the Netherlands and Christina von Amsberg.

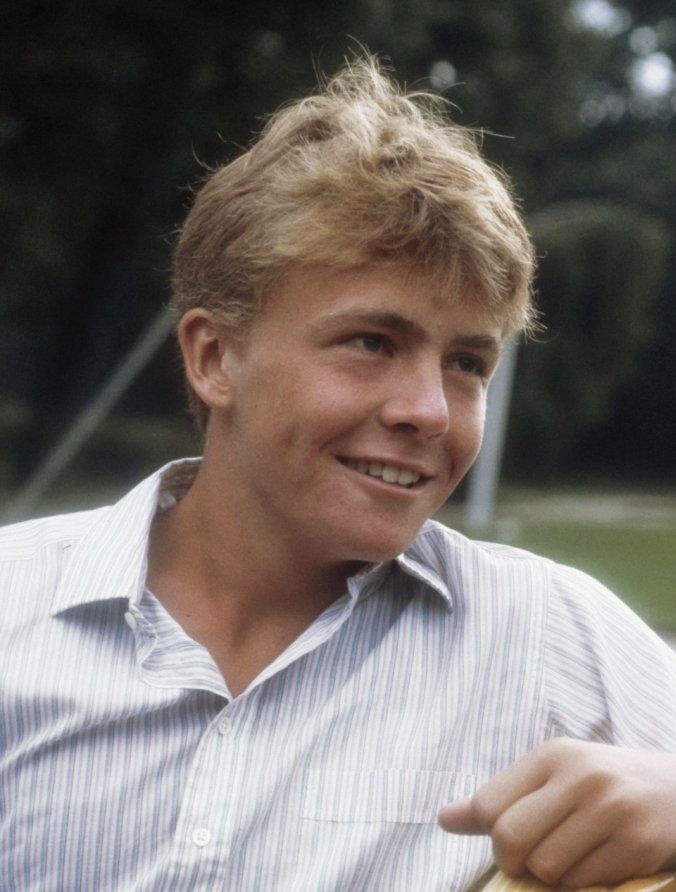
Prince Friso in 1986

In 1986, he graduated from the secondary school Eerste Vrijzinnig Christelijk Lyceum in The Hague. From 1986 until 1988, he studied mechanical engineering at the University of California, Berkeley. From 1988 he studied at Delft University of Technology, where he obtained an engineer's degree in aeronautical engineering in 1994. From 1990 he also went to the Erasmus University Rotterdam, where he obtained an MSc degree in business economics in 1995. Subsequently, he attended INSEAD (Fontainebleau, France), where he received an MBA degree in 1997.

== Work ==
Prince Friso worked from 1995 to 1996 at the Amsterdam branch of the international management consultancy McKinsey. After completing an MBA-programme at INSEAD, Prince Friso worked from 1998 to 2003 as a vice president at Goldman Sachs International in London. In 2004, he became part-time co-president of TNO Space in Delft. From October 2006, Prince Friso was managing director in the London office of a private investment and advisory firm, Wolfensohn & Company.

Prince Friso was a co-founder of the MRI Centre in Amsterdam and was also a founding shareholder of Wizzair, the largest low-cost airline in Eastern Europe. He was honorary chairman of the Prince Claus Fund for Culture and Development (a position he held together with his younger brother, Prince Constantijn).

Prior to his accident, Prince Friso was working as a chief financial officer for URENCO, a uranium enrichment company.

== Marriage and children ==
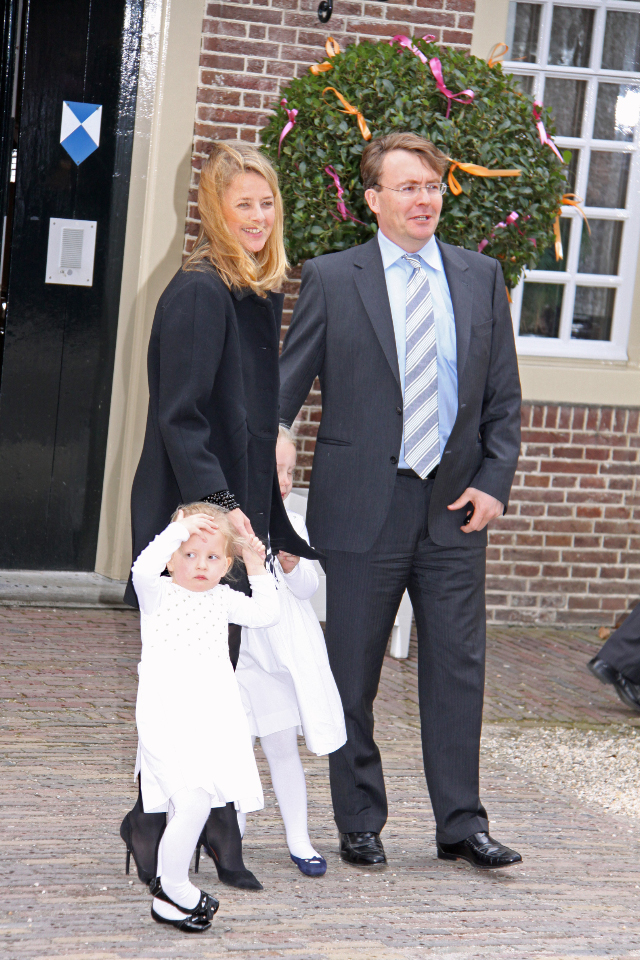
Prince Friso with his wife Mabel and daughters in 2010

On 30 June 2003, it was announced that Prince Friso was to marry Mabel Wisse Smit. The Dutch cabinet, however, did not seek permission from parliament for this marriage, a constitutional requirement if Prince Friso was to remain a member of the Dutch Royal House and in line of succession for the throne; at the time, he was second in line after his older brother, Willem-Alexander.

The Prime Minister Jan Peter Balkenende explained that this was due to discussions with Mabel Wisse Smit in October 2003, when she had admitted that her previous statements about an alleged relationship with Klaas Bruinsma (1953–1991), a known Dutch drug baron, had not been complete and accurate. She had previously stated that she had contact for a few months with Bruinsma, but in a casual context, neither intimate nor relating to business, and that she had broken the contact on learning of Bruinsma's occupation.

This "breach of trust" was the reason the government did not seek parliamentary permission, respecting the wishes of the couple. They nevertheless married at Oude Kerk (Delft) on 24 April 2004, and Mabel Wisse Smit became a member of the Dutch Royal Family but not a member of the Dutch Royal House.

Considering that his elder brother King Willem-Alexander has three daughters, Prince Friso's exclusion from the succession was unlikely to have an effect on the monarchy in the Netherlands.

After their marriage, Prince Friso and his wife Princess Mabel set up home in London, in the suburb of Kew.

The couple's first daughter, Countess Emma Luana Ninette Sophie of Orange-Nassau, Jonkvrouwe van Amsberg, was born on 26 March 2005 in London. Their second daughter, Countess Joanna Zaria Nicoline Milou of Orange-Nassau, Jonkvrouwe van Amsberg, was born on 18 June 2006, also in London.

== Avalanche accident ==
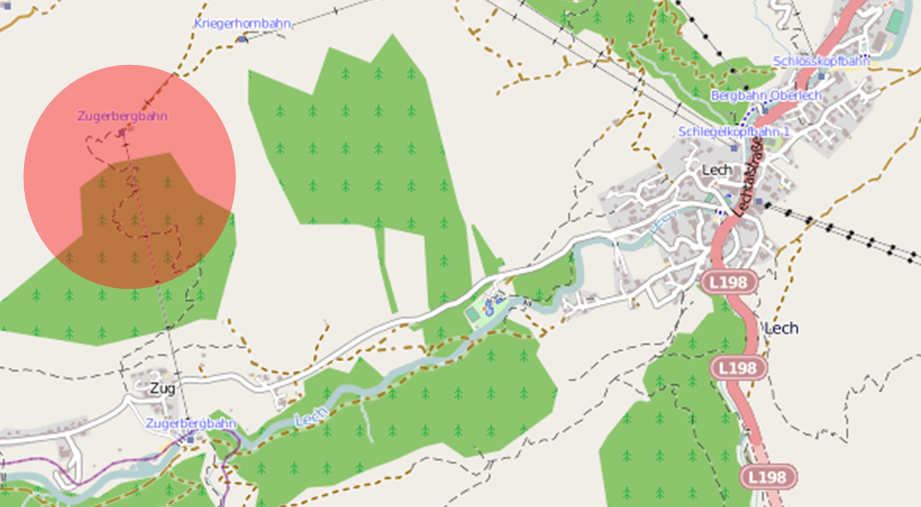
Location of the avalanche near Lech in Austria

=== Accident ===
On 17 February 2012, Prince Friso was buried under an avalanche in Lech, Austria, and he was taken to a hospital in Innsbruck. According to a formal statement of the Netherlands Government Information Service (RVD), a prognosis could be given only after some days. The prince's condition was described as "stable, but critical".

=== Resulting complications ===
The Dutch Royal Family issued a statement on 19 February saying "The Royal Family is very grateful and deeply touched by all expressions of support and sympathy after the ski accident of His Royal Highness Prince Friso. It was a great support for them during this difficult time."

A prognosis on his health situation was expected within a few days, but this was pushed back to 24 February, a week after his accident. The RVD's comment remained the same: stable, but critical. On 24 February, an Innsbruck medical team announced that the prince had been buried for 25 minutes, followed by a 50-minute CPR to treat his cardiac arrest. Wolfgang Koller stated that an MRI scan was performed a day earlier revealing little change, however other neurological tests indicated significant damage due to oxygen shortage. It remained unclear whether the prince would ever regain full consciousness. Koller said that the Prince's family might now look for a rehabilitation institution. On the same day the Dutch Royal Family issued a statement requesting that the privacy of the Prince's family be respected to enable them to come to terms with his condition.

On 1 March 2012, Prince Friso was transferred to the Wellington Hospital, in London where he and his wife had lived for many years.

On 19 November 2012, it was announced that the prince had started to show some signs of consciousness but it was still not certain whether he would ever wake up, and if he did, in what state.

On 9 July 2013, Prince Friso was moved back to Huis ten Bosch in the Netherlands. It was understood that his coma had then evolved into a minimally conscious state. As he was no longer in need of hospital-level medical care, he stayed with his family for the summer.

== Death and funeral ==
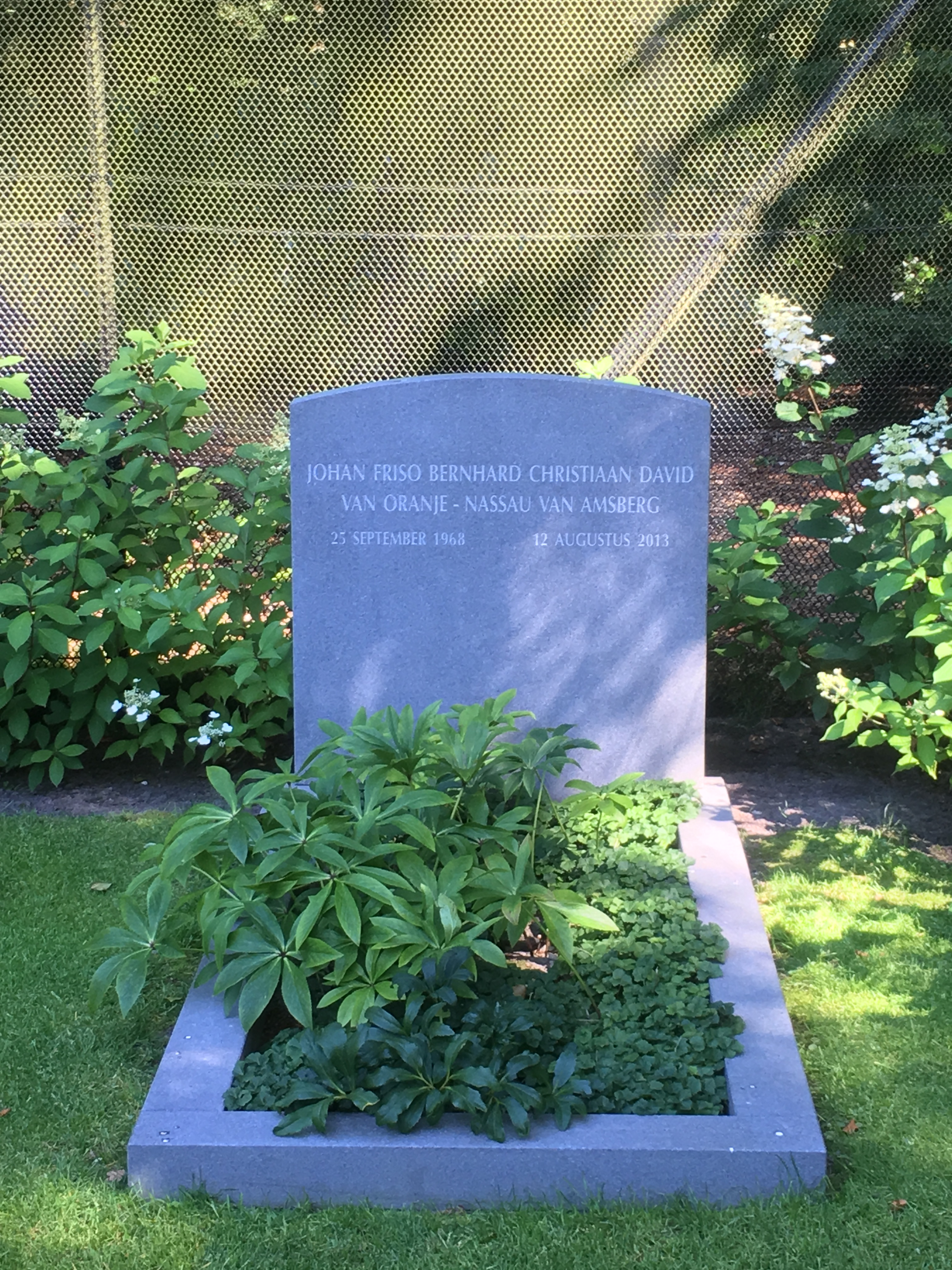
The grave of Prince Friso of Orange-Nassau van Amsberg at the Dutch Reformed Cemetery in Lage Vuursche.

On 12 August 2013, it was announced that Prince Friso had died in Huis ten Bosch of complications from the accident. He was buried on 16 August in the Dutch Reformed Cemetery in the hamlet of Lage Vuursche near Drakesteijn Castle, where he had spent his childhood and where Princess Beatrix returned to live in February 2014. The funeral service, at Stulpkerk church, was strictly private. Members of the public and media could not attend, nor did members of other royal families attend, with the exception of Friso's godfather, King Harald V of Norway. A ceremony of commemoration was held on 2 November 2013 in the Oude Kerk in Delft.

== Titles, styles and honours ==
Royal Monogram

=== Titles and styles ===
- 25 September 1968 – 19 March 2004: His Royal Highness Prince Johan-Friso of the Netherlands, Prince of Orange-Nassau, Jonkheer van Amsberg
- 19 March 2004 – 12 August 2013: His Royal Highness Prince Friso of Orange-Nassau, Count of Orange-Nassau, Jonkheer van Amsberg

Under the Act on the Membership of the Royal House (2002), Prince Friso lost the title 'Prince of the Netherlands' by entering into a marriage without an Act of Consent.

By a royal decree of 19 March 2004, Prince Friso was granted the surname 'Van Oranje-Nassau van Amsberg', the hereditary noble predicate 'Jonkheer (Jonkvrouw) van Amsberg and the hereditary title 'Count of Orange-Nassau', to take effect upon his marriage.

By the same decree, he was allowed to retain his title 'Prince of Orange-Nassau' as a personal and non-hereditary title and the style of 'Royal Highness'. According to the notification of this Royal Decree, any children born to the couple were to receive the surname 'van Oranje-Nassau van Amsberg' and become a 'Count (Countess) of Orange-Nassau' and also have the noble predicate 'Jonkheer (Jonkvrouw) van Amsberg'. So his children had the same titles and names as those of Prince Constantijn, and showing that they belong to the royal family descending from Queen Beatrix and Prince Claus. In social use, they are named with their comital title. His wife acquired the feminine version of her husband's style and titles as a courtesy title, since it is customary for wives of members of the royal family to take the titles of their husbands.

Referred to from birth as Prince Johan-Friso, in 2004, the royal court announced that he had requested that he would henceforth be called "Prince Friso".

=== Honours ===
==== National ====
- Netherlands :
  - Knight Grand Cross of the Order of the Netherlands Lion
  - Knight of the Order of the Gold Lion of the House of Nassau (by birth)
  - Royal Wedding Medal 2002 (2 February 2002)

== Ancestry ==
Ancestors of Prince Friso of Orange-Nassau

8. Wilhelm von Amsberg (nl)
4. Claus Felix von Amsberg
9. Elise von Vieregge (nl)
2. Jonkheer Claus von Amsberg
10. Baron Georg von dem Bussche-Haddenhausen (nl)
5. Baroness Gösta von dem Bussche-Haddenhausen
11. Baroness Gabriele von dem Bussche-Ippenburg (nl)
1. Prince Friso of Orange-Nassau
12. Prince Bernhard of Lippe
6. Prince Bernhard of Lippe-Biesterfeld
13. Armgard von Cramm
3. Beatrix of the Netherlands
14. Duke Henry of Mecklenburg-Schwerin
7. Juliana of the Netherlands
15. Wilhelmina of the Netherlands
