= Prince Constantijn of the Netherlands =

Dutch prince (born 1969)

Prince Constantijn
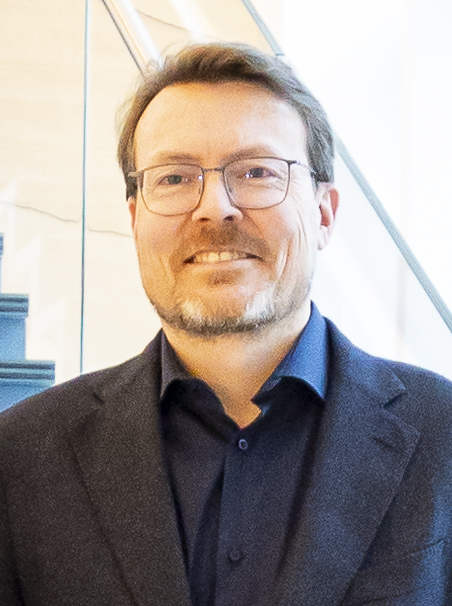
- Constantijn in 2024
- Born: 11 October 1969 (age 56); University Medical Center Utrecht, Utrecht, Netherlands
- Spouse: Petra Laurentien Brinkhorst (m. 2001)
- Issue: Countess Eloise; Count Claus-Casimir; Countess Leonore
Names
- Constantijn Christof Frederik Aschwin
- House: Orange-Nassau (Official); Amsberg (Agnatic)
- Father: Claus von Amsberg
- Mother: Beatrix of the Netherlands

Prince Constantijn of the Netherlands (Constantijn Christof Frederik Aschwin; born 11 October 1969) is the third and youngest son of the former Dutch queen, Beatrix, and her husband, Claus von Amsberg, and is the younger brother of the reigning Dutch king, Willem-Alexander. He is a member of the Dutch Royal House and currently fourth in the line of succession to the Dutch throne behind his nieces.

== Life and career ==
Prince Constantijn was born on 11 October 1969 at Academic Hospital Utrecht (now the University Medical Center Utrecht) in Utrecht following the births of his brothers, Willem-Alexander (b. 1967), and Johan Friso (1968–2013). He goes by the nickname Tijn. His godparents are former King Constantine II of Greece (1940–2023), Prince Aschwin of Lippe-Biesterfeld, Axel Freiherr von dem Bussche-Streithorst, Max Kohnstamm, and Corinne de Beaufort-Sickinghe.

Prince Constantijn studied law at Leiden University, becoming a lawyer, and then worked at the Brussels department of the (Dutch) European Union commissioner of foreign relations, Hans van den Broek. Later, he was hired by the EU and continued to work there in various capacities until the end of 1999. In December 2000, he was awarded a Master of Business Administration at INSEAD in Fontainebleau, France. He spent a summer working for the International Finance Corporation (part of the World Bank Group) in Washington, DC. He worked until late 2002 for strategic consultants Booz Allen Hamilton in London. Since 2003, he works for the RAND Corporation Europe in Brussels. Furthermore, he has a part-time position at the Netherlands Ministry of Foreign Affairs in The Hague.

In January 2017, in his role as special envoy for StartupDelta, Prince Constantijn led a trade mission of 30 Dutch tech startups to the Consumer Electronics Show (CES) in Las Vegas. The mission focused on showcasing Dutch innovation in fields like artificial intelligence to an international audience of nearly 180,000 visitors.

Prince Constantijn rarely attends public events in his capacity as a member of the Dutch royal family. He is a keen sportsman and enjoys football, tennis, golf, and skiing. His other hobbies include drawing, cooking, and reading.

== Marriage and family ==
The engagement of Prince Constantijn and Petra Laurentien Brinkhorst was announced on 16 December 2000. The civil marriage was conducted by the mayor of The Hague, Wim Deetman, in the Oude Raadzaal, Javastraat, The Hague, on 17 May 2001. The church wedding took place two days later on 19 May in the Grote or St Jacobskerk, with the Reverend Carel ter Linden officiating.

Prince Constantijn and Princess Laurentien have three children: Eloise (b. 2002), Claus-Casimir (b. 2004), and Leonore (b. 2006). The family then moved from Brussels, where they lived, to The Hague.

Upon the abdication of Queen Beatrix on 30 April 2013, the children of Prince Constantijn and Princess Laurentien ceased to be members of the Royal House, although they continue to be members of the royal family and remain in the line of succession.

== Honours and arms ==
Constantijn's monogram

=== National ===
- Netherlands: Knight Grand Cross of the Order of the Lion of the Netherlands
- Netherlands: Knight of the Order of the Gold Lion of the House of Nassau (11 October 1969; by birth)
- Netherlands: Recipient of the Queen Beatrix Investiture Medal (30 April 1980)
- Netherlands: Recipient of the Royal Wedding Medal 2002 (2 February 2002)
- Netherlands: Recipient of the King Willem-Alexander Investiture Medal (30 April 2013)

=== Foreign ===
- Belgium: Knight Grand Cross of the Order of the Crown (20 June 2006)
- France: Grand Officer of the Order of the Legion of Honour (11 April 2023)
- Germany: Grand Cross, 1st class of the Order of Merit of the Federal Republic of Germany (9 June 2026)
- Jordan: Knight Grand Cordon of the Order of the Renaissance (30 October 2006)

=== Arms ===
Coat of arms of Prince Constantijn of the Netherlands
| Notes Prince Constantijn bore the same coat of arms as his brothers; Prince Willem-Alexander and Prince Friso. Escutcheon Quarterly: I and IV azure billety or, a lion with coronet also or armed and langued gules, holding in his dexter paw a sword argent hilted or, and in his sinister seven arrows argent pointed and bound together or, which is of the Kingdom of the Netherlands; II and III or, a horn azure opened and bound gules, which is of the First House of Orange; on an inescutcheon vert, a castle proper, on a mount of the last (arms of the House of Amsberg, i.e. that of his late father, Prince Claus). Banner Prince Constantijn uses a square, with the Royal standard colours and his maternal arms (the horn of Orange) in the 2nd and 3rd quarters and two white towers in the 1st and 4th quarters. The crowned arms of the Netherlands is in the middle. |

Prince Constantijn of the Netherlands House of Orange-Nassau Cadet branch of the House of Nassau Born: 11 October 1969
Lines of succession
| Preceded by Princess Ariane of the Netherlands | Succession to the Dutch throne 4th in line | Followed by Countess Eloise of Orange-Nassau |
