= Countess Leonore of Orange-Nassau =

Dutch noble (born 2006)

- Countess of Orange-Nassau; Jonkvrouwe van Amsberg
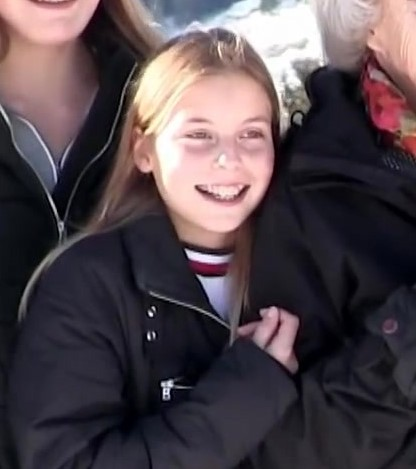
- Countess Leonore in 2019
- Born: 3 June 2006 (age 20); HMC Bronovo, The Hague, Netherlands
Names
- Leonore Marie Irene Enrica van Oranje-Nassau van Amsberg
- Royal family: Orange-Nassau (official); Amsberg (agnatic)
- Father: Prince Constantijn of the Netherlands
- Mother: Laurentien Brinkhorst

Countess Leonore of Orange-Nassau, Jonkvrouwe van Amsberg (Leonore Marie Irene Enrica; born 3 June 2006), is a member of the Dutch royal family. She is the third child and second daughter of Prince Constantijn of the Netherlands and Princess Laurentien of the Netherlands. As of 2025, she is seventh in the line of succession to the Dutch throne.

== Life and education ==
Countess Leonore was born on 3 June 2006 at HMC Bronovo in The Hague, Netherlands, as the third child and second daughter of Prince Constantijn and Princess Laurentien.

She was baptised on 8 October 2006 in the chapel of Het Loo Palace in Apeldoorn; her godparents included her paternal aunt, Queen Máxima; her maternal uncle, Marius Brinkhorst; her father’s first cousin, Juliana Guillermo; and Count Jean‑Charles Ullens de Schooten Whettnall.

After spending the early years of her life partly in Belgium where her family lived while her parents worked, Countess Leonore later relocated with her family to the Netherlands in 2015.

Since September 2022, she has been studying at UWC Atlantic College in Wales, a United World College known for its international education programme, the same school attended by her cousin, Princess Alexia.

== Titles and styles ==
By royal decree of 11 May 2001 (nr. 227), it was determined that the children born from the marriage of Prince Constantijn and Princess Laurentien of the Netherlands would bear the title Count/Countess of Orange‑Nassau and the honorific Jonkheer/Jonkvrouwe van Amsberg with the surname Van Oranje-Nassau van Amsberg.

Upon the abdication of Queen Beatrix on 30 April 2013, the children of Prince Constantijn and Princess Laurentien ceased to be members of the Royal House, although continue to be members of the royal family.

Countess Leonore of Orange-Nassau House of Orange-Nassau Born: 3 June 2006
Lines of succession
Preceded by Count Claus-Casimir of Orange-Nassau	Succession to the Dutch throne 7th in line	Succeeded by Princess Margriet of the Netherlands
