= Succession to the Dutch throne =

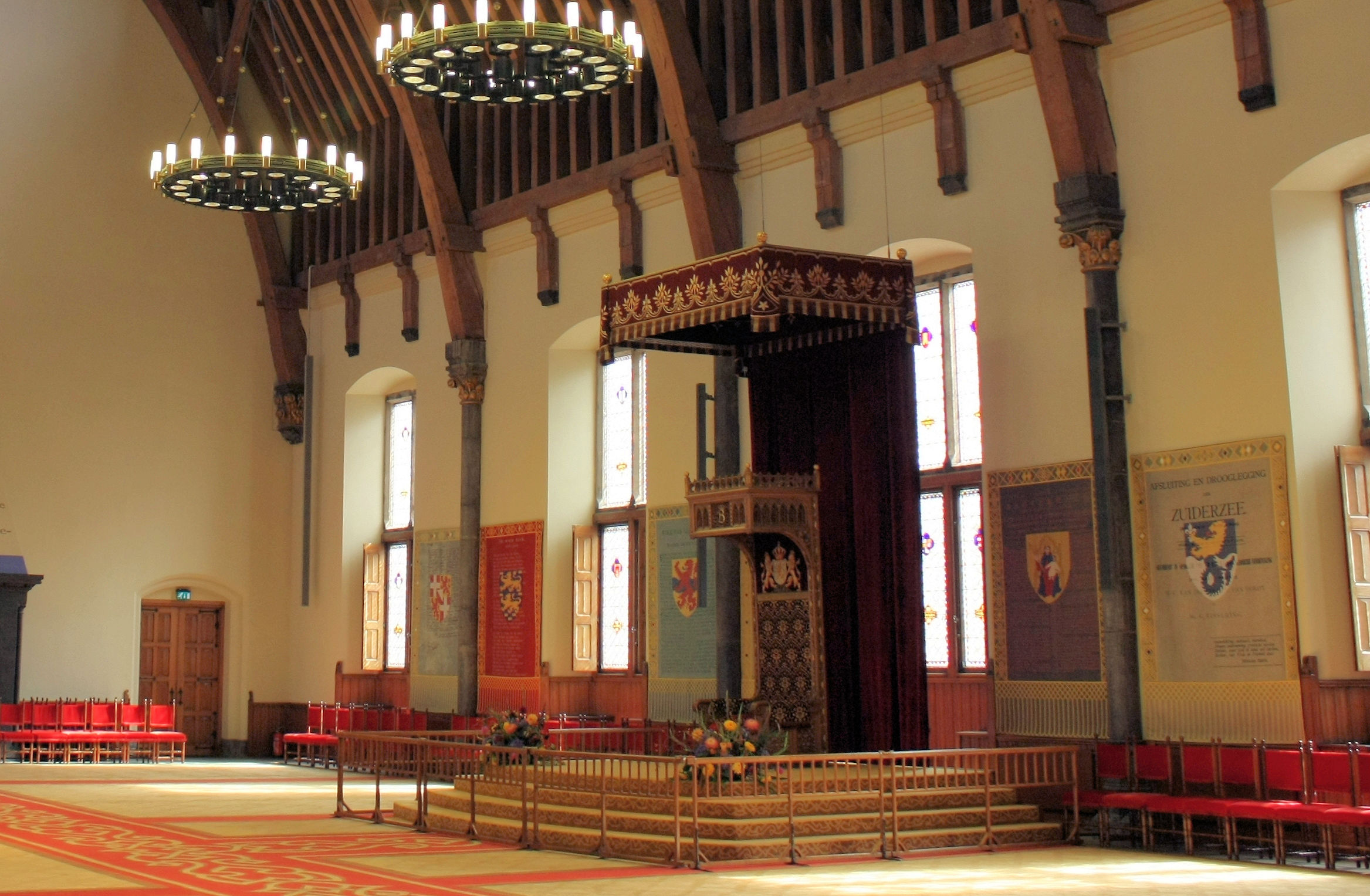
Throne in the Ridderzaal, from which the Dutch monarch delivers the Throne Speech on the Prince's Day.

Since 1983, the crown of the Netherlands passes according to absolute primogeniture. From 1814 until 1887, a monarch could only be succeeded by their closest female relative if there were no eligible male relatives. Male-preference cognatic primogeniture was adopted in 1887, though abolished when absolute primogeniture was introduced in 1983. Proximity of blood has been taken into consideration since 1922, when the constitution was changed to limit the line of succession to three degrees of kinship from the current monarch. In a situation where the monarch is succeeded by an eligible aunt or uncle, persons previously excluded could be reintroduced into the line of succession.

In October 2021, in a letter to parliament Prime Minister Mark Rutte stated that the monarch and the heir to the throne could marry a person of the same sex without being forced to abdicate or give up their place in the line of succession.

== Line of succession ==
The list below contains all people currently eligible to directly succeed to the throne (numbered 1 to 8) and the descendants of Princess Margriet who would be eligible if she were to succeed.

- Queen Juliana (1909–2004)
  - Queen Beatrix (born 1938)
    - King Willem-Alexander (born 1967)
      - (1) Catharina-Amalia, Princess of Orange (born 2003)
      - (2) Princess Alexia (b. 2005)
      - (3) Princess Ariane (b. 2007)
    - (4) Prince Constantijn (b. 1969)
      - (5) Countess Eloise (b. 2002)
      - (6) Count Claus-Casimir (b. 2004)
      - (7) Countess Leonore (b. 2006)
  - (8) Princess Margriet (b. 1943)
    - Prince Maurits (b. 1968)
      - Anastasia van Lippe-Biesterfeld van Vollenhoven (b. 2001)
      - Lucas van Lippe-Biesterfeld van Vollenhoven (b. 2002)
      - Felicia van Lippe-Biesterfeld van Vollenhoven (b. 2005)
    - Prince Bernhard (b. 1969)
      - Isabella van Vollenhoven (b. 2002)
      - Samuel van Vollenhoven (b. 2004)
      - Benjamin van Vollenhoven (b. 2008)

== See also ==
- List of heirs to the Dutch throne
- Monarchy of the Netherlands

== Notes ==
- Beatrix's second son, Prince Friso of Orange-Nassau, was removed from the line of succession in 2004 when he married without seeking Parliamentary approval. His two daughters, Countess Luana of Orange-Nassau van Amsberg and Countess Zaria of Orange-Nassau van Amsberg, are not in the line of succession.
- Princess Irene (Beatrix's younger sister) was removed from the list when she married Carlos Hugo, Duke of Parma, without Parliamentary approval. Approval was withheld because Carlos Hugo's Carlist pretense to the Spanish throne threatened to cause a Constitutional crisis. Thus her descendants are also not in the line of succession.
- Prince Pieter-Christiaan and Prince Floris of Orange-Nassau, van Vollenhoven (the younger sons of Princess Margriet), were removed from the list because they had both decided not to seek Parliamentary approval for their 2005 marriages due to their remote chance of succeeding to the throne. Thus their descendants are also not in the line of succession.
- Prince Maurits and Prince Bernhard of Orange-Nassau, van Vollenhoven (the elder sons of Princess Margriet, the aunt of King Willem-Alexander), and their descendants are not in the line because they are too distantly related to the reigning monarch. When Willem-Alexander became king on 30 April 2013, his aunt's sons lost their succession rights and will only regain them if she succeeds to the throne – in which case her children Prince Maurits and Prince Bernhard and their children would assume appropriate places in the line of succession.
