= Drakensteyn Castle =

Castle in Baarn, Netherlands

- Drakensteyn (sometimes Drakesteijn or Drakestein)
- Lage Vuursche, the Netherlands
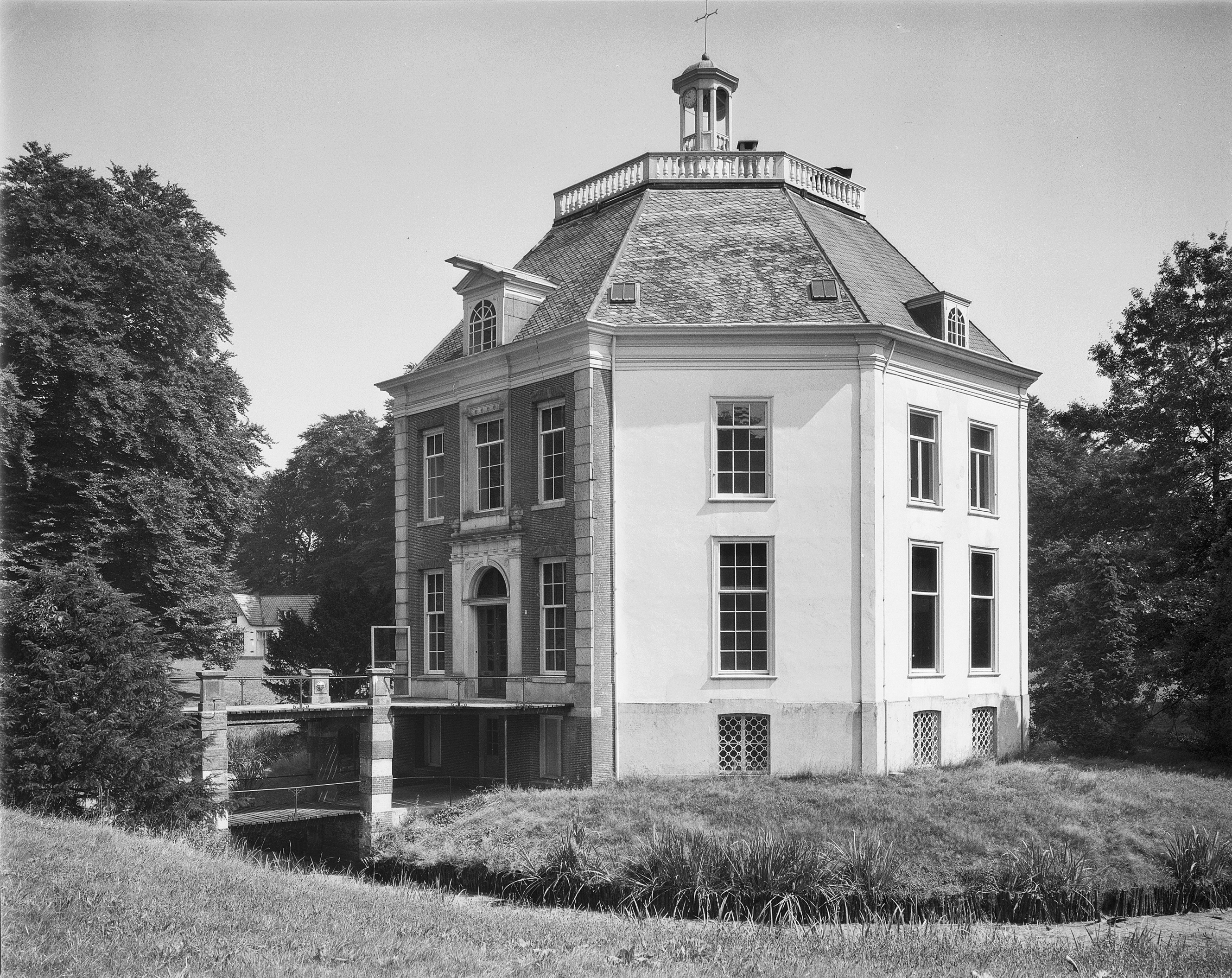
- Drakensteyn in 1959

Site information
- Type: Castle
- Owner: Beatrix of the Netherlands
- Open to the public: No
- Condition: Good

Location
- the Netherlands Drakensteyn Castle (Netherlands)
- Coordinates: 52°10′47″N 5°13′38″E

Site history
- Built: 1640
- Built by: Gerard van Reede

Drakensteyn Castle (Dutch: Drakensteyn, sometimes Drakesteijn or Drakestein) is a small castle at 8 Slotlaan in the hamlet of Lage Vuursche, in the municipality of Baarn, Netherlands. It is the private residence of Princess Beatrix of the Netherlands, the country's former Queen.

The royal connection aside, its most distinctive feature is its octagonal shape. It is surrounded by a moat that can be crossed via a bridge. Its style can be described as Classicist.

== History ==
A house called Drakesteijn at this location was first mentioned in 1360, but the current building was constructed in the years 1640–1643 for a Gerard van Reede Läm. In 1634 Drakensteyn was passed to Ernst van Reede. In the 17th and 18th centuries the castle changed hands several times. The mayor of Utrecht, Paulus Wilhelmus Bosch became the owner of Drakensteyn Castle from 1807 and he and his family owned the house for 150 years until Frederik Lodewijk Bosch van Drakestein sold it to Princess Beatrix. Nearby, at 4 Kloosterlaan, is the similarly-named Klein Drakesteijn ("Little Drakesteijn"), which was built in 1780.

== Royal residence ==
Princess Beatrix bought the castle in 1959, when she was the heir to the Dutch throne, and took up residence in 1963 after a programme of renovations. After her marriage in 1966 she continued to live there with her husband, Prince Claus and raised their three sons there. After Beatrix succeeded her mother Juliana as Queen of the Netherlands in 1980, the family moved to The Hague in 1981.

On 28 January 2013, it was announced that Beatrix would again take up residence at the castle after her abdication later that year. Her son, Willem-Alexander, was installed on the Dutch throne on 30 April 2013. On 2 February 2014, Beatrix moved into the castle.

== See also ==
- List of castles in the Netherlands
