= Count Claus-Casimir of Orange-Nassau =

Dutch noble (born 2004)

Claus-Casimir van Oranje-Nassau van Amsberg
- Count of Oranje-Nassau, Jonkheer van Amsberg
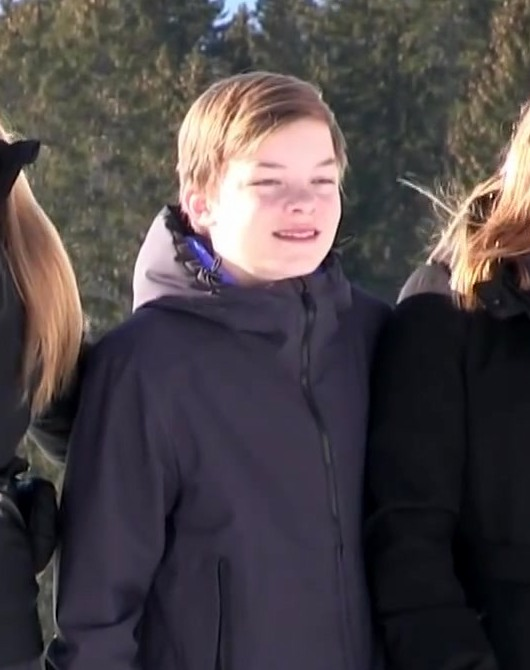
- Count Claus-Casimir in 2019
- Born: 21 March 2004 (age 22); HMC Bronovo, The Hague, Netherlands
Names
- Claus-Casimir Bernhard Marius Max van Oranje-Nassau van Amsberg
- Royal family: Orange-Nassau (official); Amsberg (agnatic)
- Father: Prince Constantijn of the Netherlands
- Mother: Laurentien Brinkhorst
- Religion: Protestant Church in the Netherlands

Count Claus-Casimir of Orange-Nassau, Jonkheer van Amsberg (Claus-Casimir Bernhard Marius Max; born 21 March 2004), is the second child of Prince Constantijn and Princess Laurentien of the Netherlands and their only son. He is a member of the Dutch royal family and is sixth in the line of succession to the Dutch throne.

== Life ==
His birth was overshadowed by the death, only a day before, of his great-grandmother Queen Juliana. He has two sisters: Countess Eloise, born 8 June 2002 and Countess Leonore, born 3 June 2006.

His baptism took place in the chapel of Het Loo Palace in Apeldoorn on 10 October 2004. Claus-Casimir's godparents are King Willem-Alexander, Prince Maurits of Orange-Nassau, van Vollenhoven, Ed P. Spanjaard, and Countess Tatiana Razumovsky von Wigstein.

Claus-Casimir grew up in Brussels before moving to The Hague in 2015. After attending high school at Vrijzinnig Christelijk Lyceum (VCL) in The Hague, Claus-Casimir moved to Scotland in 2020 to attend Gordonstoun School, leaving in 2022. From September 2022 until June 2025, he studied at ESCP Business School.

== Titles and styles ==
By royal decree of 11 May 2001 (nr. 227), it was determined that the children born from the marriage of Prince Constantijn and Princess Laurentien of the Netherlands would bear the title Count/Countess of Orange‑Nassau and the honorific Jonkheer/Jonkvrouwe van Amsberg with the surname Van Oranje-Nassau van Amsberg.

Upon the abdication of Queen Beatrix on 30 April 2013, the children of Prince Constantijn and Princess Laurentien ceased to be members of the Royal House, although they continue to be members of the royal family and in the line of succession to the Dutch throne.

Count Claus-Casimir of Orange-Nassau House of Orange-Nassau Born: 21 March 2004
Lines of succession
Preceded by Countess Eloise of Orange-Nassau	Line of succession to the Dutch throne 6th in line	Succeeded by Countess Leonore of Orange-Nassau
