= Amsberg =

German noble family

House of Amsberg
- Coat of arms of the Amsberg family
- Current region: Germany; Netherlands
- Origin: Mecklenburg
- Founded: 1686; 340 years ago
- Founder: Jürgen Amtsberg
- Current head: Willem-Alexander of the Netherlands
- Titles: King of the Netherlands; Prince of the Netherlands; Prince of Orange-Nassau; Jonkheer van Amsberg; Herr von Amsberg
- Cadet branches: Orange-Nassau van Amsberg

The House of Amsberg (German: von Amsberg, Dutch: van Amsberg) is a German noble family of Polabian origin that originated in Mecklenburg and whose agnatic head is the present King of the Netherlands, Willem-Alexander. A great-grandson of a blacksmith and grandson of a baker, parish pastor August Amsberg (1747–1820) started calling himself "von Amsberg" in 1795, and the family's right to use this name was confirmed in 1891 by Frederick Francis III, Grand Duke of Mecklenburg-Schwerin. By this permission to use a nobiliary particle, the family effectively became part of the German untitled lower nobility (Niederer Adel) of the Grand Duchy of Mecklenburg-Schwerin.

Members of the family live in the Netherlands and Northern Germany. The family's most notable member is the family's current head (i.e., senior male-line descendant), King Willem-Alexander of the Netherlands. King Willem-Alexander, his brothers, and his brothers' children hold the title of "Jonkheer (or female Jonkvrouw) van Amsberg" and have the surname "van Oranje-Nassau van Amsberg".

== History ==
The family line traces back to one Jürgen Amtsberg (d. 1686), master blacksmith in the village of Schwichtenberg near Borrentin, then part of Swedish Pomerania. His great-grandson Johann David Theodor August Amsberg (1747–1820), Protestant pastor at the parish church of Kavelstorf near Rostock in the Duchy of Mecklenburg-Schwerin, from about 1795 styled himself von Amsberg without objection. The Amsbergs had been commoners at first, and the preposition probably was used to signify the family from the name of their ancestors, rather than from the name of a place they originated from. A notable member was his son Philipp August von Amsberg (1788–1871), who initiated the establishment of the Duchy of Brunswick State Railway, inaugurated in 1838. The family received official approval to use the nobiliary particle by decree of the Grand Duchy of Mecklenburg-Schwerin in 1891.

On 10 March 1966, Claus von Amsberg married the heir presumptive to the Dutch throne, Princess Beatrix of Orange-Nassau, Princess of Lippe-Biesterfeld. From 1980 until he died in 2002, he was the Prince Consort of the Queen of the Netherlands. He is the father of Willem-Alexander, King of the Netherlands, and Jonkheer van Amsberg. Willem-Alexander's younger brother, Prince Friso van Oranje-Nassau van Amsberg, due to his marriage with Mabel Martine Wisse Smit, lost his status as a Prince of the Netherlands but retained for himself royal status as prince of Orange-Nassau, and for his children received the title of count/countess of Orange-Nassau.

The marriage of the third-born son, Prince Constantijn, has produced the only male heir of the main Amsberg line, Claus-Casimir van Oranje-Nassau van Amsberg, born in 2004. In 2001, it was established by Decree that children born in the marriage of Prince Constantijn will hold the hereditary noble title and honorific of Count (Countess) van Oranje-Nassau, Jonkheer (Jonkvrouw) van Amsberg, and have the surname Van Oranje-Nassau van Amsberg. In 2004, the same regulation was established for Prince Friso and the children born in his marriage. When Willem-Alexander became king in 2013, the House of Amsberg did not become the ruling house of the Netherlands, which stayed as his mother's house, as is tradition in the Netherlands.

Several family members, mainly descendants of Philipp August von Amsberg and Prince Claus' great-uncle Joachim von Amsberg (1869–1945), still live in Northern Germany.

The Dutch branch of the family, i.e., Prince Claus and his descendants, has some distant Dutch/Flemish ancestors who left the Low Countries during Spanish rule, such as the Berenberg family and other prominent families of Antwerp.

Other notable family members include Colonel Joachim von Amsberg, General Joachim von Amsberg, and banker Joachim von Amsberg.

== Heads of the family ==
This is a list of the heads, i.e., the senior male-line members, of the Amsberg family, and the patrilineal line of the current Dutch royal family. Before the 1891 ennoblement, being the senior male descendant did not have any legal relevance, and as such, the term "head" is anachronistic before the family's rise as a noble and eventually royal family. Since its recognition as noble in 1891, the family's headship had some historical legal relevance before formally abolishing the nobility's privileges in 1918.

1. Jürgen Amtsberg, ca. 1640–1686, blacksmith
2. Jürgen Amtsberg, 1680–1756, baker
3. Georg Amtsberg, 1717–1772
4. Johann David Theodor August Amsberg, clergyman. He started calling himself "von Amsberg" from 1795, 1747–1820, pastor in Kavelstorf
5. Joachim Karl Theodor von Amsberg, 1777–1842
6. Gabriel Ludwig Johann von Amsberg, 1822–1899, received permission from the Grand Duke to use the particle "von" in 1891, effectively an ennoblement
7. Wilhelm von Amsberg, 1856–1929
8. Claus Felix von Amsberg, 1890–1953
9. Prince Claus of the Netherlands, Jonkheer van Amsberg, né Klaus von Amsberg, 1926–2002, a former diplomat of Germany
10. King Willem-Alexander of the Netherlands, Jonkheer van Amsberg, b. 1967.

=== Line of succession to the headship of the Amsberg family ===
Since the German aristocracy practices agnatic primogeniture, the heir presumptive to the headship, and the ones next in line, are

1. Prince Constantijn of the Netherlands, Jonkheer van Amsberg, the King of the Netherlands' younger brother
2. Count Claus-Casimir of Orange-Nassau, Jonkheer van Amsberg, Constantijn's son
3. Dirk von Amsberg (b. 1961), a grandson of General Joachim von Amsberg, who in turn was a son of Gabriel Ludwig Johann von Amsberg
4. Paul von Amsberg (b. 2002), Dirk's son

== Literature ==
- Genealogisches Handbuch des Adels, Adelslexikon Band I, Band 53 der Gesamtreihe, C. A. Starke Verlag, Limburg (Lahn) 1972, ISSN 0435-2408
- Die Ahnen Claus Georg von Amsberg (Euler) - Nassau und die Niederlande (Heck), Starke Verlag 1966, Sonderdruck aus Archiv für Sippenforschung Heft 21
