= Princess Laurentien of the Netherlands =

Dutch princess (born 1966)

Princess Laurentien
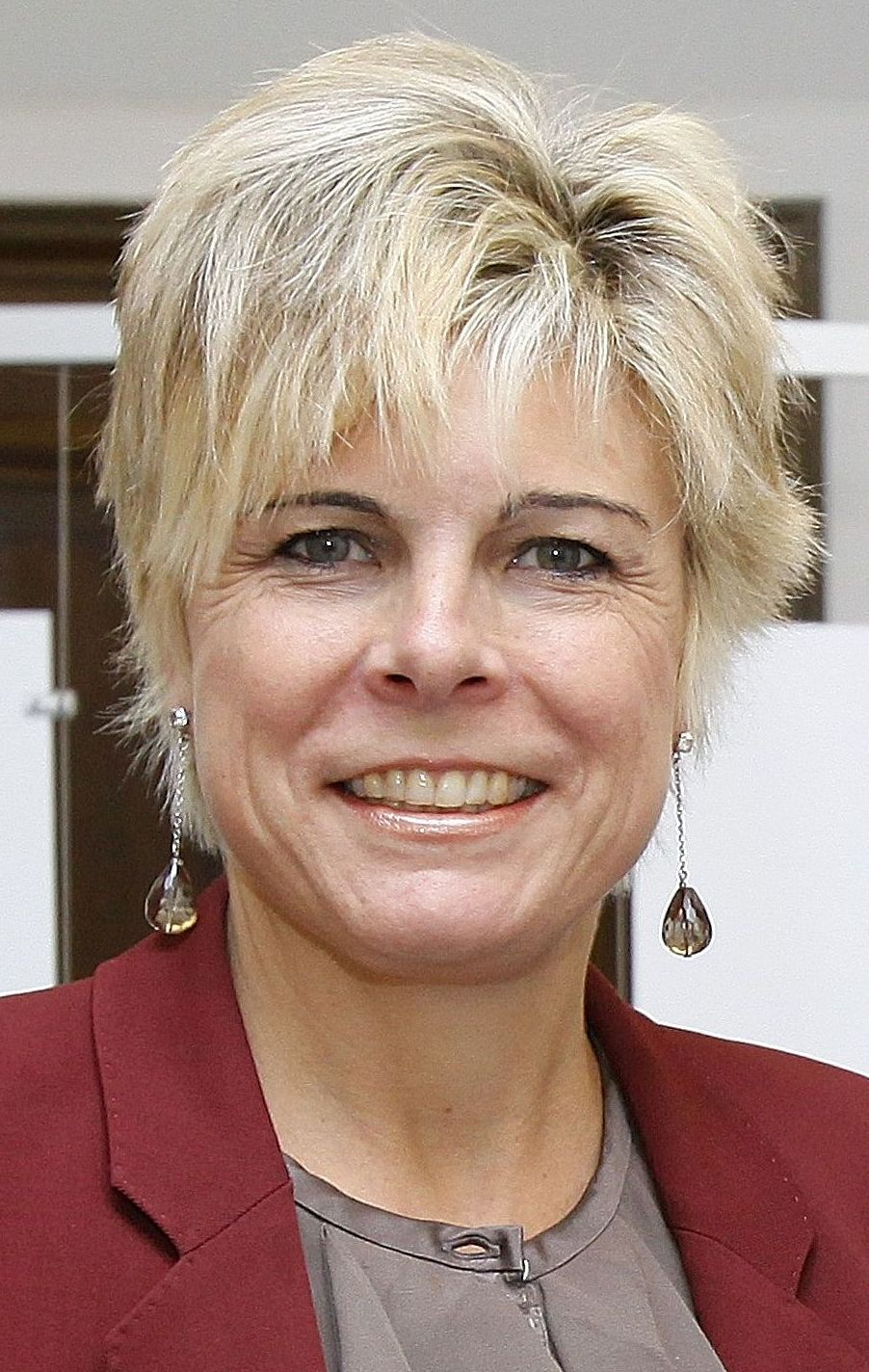
- Laurentien in 2012
- Born: 25 May 1966 (age 60); Leiden, Netherlands
- Spouse: Prince Constantijn of the Netherlands (m. 2001)
- Issue: Countess Eloise; Count Claus-Casimir; Countess Leonore
Names
- Petra Laurentien Brinkhorst
- Father: Laurens Jan Brinkhorst
- Mother: Jantien Brinkhorst-Heringa

Princess Laurentien of the Netherlands (born Petra Laurentien Brinkhorst, 25 May 1966) is married to Prince Constantijn and is the sister-in-law of King Willem-Alexander of the Netherlands.

== Early life ==
Petra Laurentien Brinkhorst was born in Leiden, Netherlands, on 25 May 1966. She is the daughter of Jantien Brinkhorst-Heringa and the former Dutch minister of Economic Affairs, Laurens Jan Brinkhorst. She has an elder brother, Marius. She is known by her middle name, Laurentien, a portmanteau of her parents' given names.

Princess Laurentien started primary school in Groningen. Her family then moved to The Hague, where she completed her primary education. She attended her secondary education in The Hague, of which four years at the Christelijk Gymnasium Sorghvliet and one year at the Eerste Vrijzinnige Christelijk Lyceum, and later in Kita, Tokyo, at the Lycée Français International de Tokyo, where she obtained her Baccalauréat diploma in 1984. Her father was working in Japan at the time, being the Ambassador of the European Union to Japan between 1982 and 1987.

Princess Laurentien studied history at the University of Groningen, where she completed her Propaedeutics in 1986. She then studied at Queen Mary College, University of London, where she received a BA degree in political science in 1989, and subsequently at the University of California, Berkeley, where she obtained an MJ degree in 1991.

== Interests and activities ==
In 2009, she was designated UNESCO Special Envoy on "Literacy for Development" in recognition of her "outstanding commitment to the promotion of education and her profound dedication to the Organization's ideals and objectives". In 2010 she was co-recipient of the Major Bosshardt Prize for her work in combating illiteracy.

In an October 2021 podcast interview, Princess Laurentien advocated for a radical rethink of education, calling for equality between students and teachers, a move away from standardized testing, and a focus on shared learning.

She is also the current president of wildlife conservation NGO Fauna and Flora International. In 2024, she announced she had resigned from her position as chairwoman of the Equally Worthy Recovery Foundation following controversies involving its costs and Laurentien's allegedly aggressive behavior toward civil servants.

== Marriage and children ==
The engagement of Prince Constantijn and Laurentien Brinkhorst was announced on 16 December 2000. The civil marriage was conducted by Wim Deetman, the mayor of the Hague, in the Oude Raadzaal, Javastraat, the Hague, on 17 May 2001. The church wedding took place two days later on 19 May in the Grote or St Jacobskerk, with Reverend Carel ter Linden officiating.

Prince Constantijn and Princess Laurentien have three children: Eloise (born 2002), Claus-Casimir (born 2004), and Leonore (born 2006).

In 2015, Prince Constantijn, Princess Laurentien, and their children moved from Brussels, where they lived, to The Hague.

== Titles, styles, and honours ==
Laurentien's monogram

Standard of Laurentien

=== Titles and styles ===
Laurentien's full title and style is: Her Royal Highness Princess Petra Laurentien of the Netherlands, Princess of Orange-Nassau, Mrs. van Amsberg.

Laurentien was not legally created a princess, but custom allows a wife to use her husband's titles. All children of the marriage hold the titles Count or Countess of Orange-Nassau and Jonkheer or Jonkvrouw van Amsberg.

By Royal Decree of 15 January 2003, nr. 36, Princess Laurentien was granted her own personal standard.

=== Honours ===
==== National honours ====
- Netherlands:
  - Dame Grand Cross of the Order of the House of Orange (17 May 2001)
  - Recipient of the Royal Wedding Medal 2002 (2 February 2002)
  - Recipient of the King Willem-Alexander Investiture Medal (30 April 2013)

==== Foreign honours ====
- Belgium: Dame Grand Cross of the Order of the Crown (28 November 2016)
- France: Grand Officer of the Order of the Legion of Honour (11 April 2023)
- Japan: Dame Commander, Special Class of the Order of the Precious Crown (17 June 2026)
- Jordan: Dame Grand Cordon of the Supreme Order of the Renaissance (30 October 2006)
