= Pieter Kooijmans =

Dutch politician, jurist, and diplomat (1933–2013)

His Excellency Pieter Kooijmans
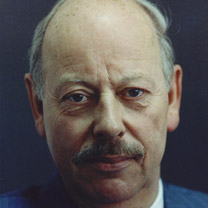
- Kooijmans in 2005

Judge of the International Court of Justice
- In office 1 March 1997 – 1 March 2006
- Preceded by: Luigi Ferrari Bravo
- Succeeded by: Kenneth Keith

Minister of Foreign Affairs
- In office 3 January 1993 – 22 August 1994
- Prime Minister: Ruud Lubbers
- Preceded by: Hans van den Broek
- Succeeded by: Hans van Mierlo

State Secretary for Foreign Affairs
- In office 11 May 1973 – 19 December 1977 Serving with Laurens Jan Brinkhorst
- Prime Minister: Joop den Uyl
- Preceded by: Tjerk Westerterp
- Succeeded by: Durk van der Mei

Personal details
- Born: Pieter Hendrik Kooijmans; 6 July 1933 Heemstede, Netherlands
- Died: 13 February 2013 (aged 79) Wassenaar, Netherlands
- Party: Christian Democratic Appeal (from 1980)
- Other political affiliations: Anti-Revolutionary Party (until 1980)
- Children: 4 children
- Occupation: Politician; Diplomat; Jurist; Judge; Researcher; Academic administrator; Author; Professor

Academic background
- Education: Eerste Christelijk Lyceum
- Alma mater: Vrije Universiteit Amsterdam (MA, LLM, PhD)
- Thesis: The doctrine of the legal equality of states: An inquiry into the foundations of international law (1964)
- Doctoral advisor: Gezina van der Molen

Academic work
- Discipline: Public international law
- Institutions: Vrije Universiteit Amsterdam; Leiden University
- Notable students: Janne Nijman

Pieter Hendrik "Peter" Kooijmans (Dutch pronunciation: [ˈpitər ˈɦɛndrɪk ˈpeːtər ˈkoːimɑns]; 6 July 1933 – 13 February 2013) was a Dutch politician, jurist, and diplomat. He was a member of the defunct Anti-Revolutionary Party (ARP), which later merged into the Christian Democratic Appeal (CDA) party. From 1993 to 1994, he served as Foreign Minister of the Netherlands, succeeding Hans van den Broek. In 1995, he returned to his former position as Professor of Public International Law at the University of Leiden, serving until his appointment to the International Court of Justice in 1997, He was granted the honorary title of Minister of State on 13 July 2007.

== Early life and education ==
Pieter Hendrik Kooijmans was born on 6 July 1933 in Heemstede in the Netherlands. His father was Johannes Kooijmans, an engineer and a member of the municipal council of Heemstede, and his mother was Alida Jonker. Kooijmans went to the secondary school Eerste Christelijk Lyceum in Haarlem, where he followed the gymnasium program in humanities.

Kooijmans studied at the Vrije Universiteit Amsterdam from July 1951, majoring in economics and law, obtaining a Bachelor of Economics degree in June 1953 and a Bachelor of Laws degree in July 1954. He then worked as a student researcher before graduating with a Master of Economics degree in June 1957 and a Master of Laws degree in July 1958. Kooijmans worked as a researcher at the VU from July 1958 until January 1962, earning his doctoral degree in international law with his dissertation The doctrine of the legal equality of states; an inquiry into the foundations of international law in 1964.

== Academic and political career ==
From 1962 to 1965 Kooijmans was lector (associate professor) of international and European law at the VU, and on 26 March 1965 he was appointed full professor of international law, succeeding Gezina van der Molen. In 1976 and again in 1991, he served as a lecturer at The Hague Academy of International Law.

After the election of 1972 Kooijmans was appointed as State Secretary for Foreign Affairs in the Den Uyl cabinet until 19 December 1977. The Cabinet Den Uyl fell on 22 March 1977 after four years of tensions in the coalition and continued to serve in a demissionary capacity. In May 1977 Kooijmans announced that he would not stand for the election of 1977. Following the cabinet formation Kooijmans did not return in the new cabinet.

Kooijmans semi-retired from national politics and served as a professor of international law at Leiden University from 10 January 1978 until 20 December 1992. He also taught international law and international relations at The Hague Academy of International Law from 1 August 1979 until 1 November 1989. Kooijmans also served as United Nations special rapporteur on human rights and torture.

Kooijmans was appointed as minister of foreign affairs in the Third Lubbers cabinet following the appointment of Hans van den Broek as the European Commissioner, taking office on 3 January 1993. In September 1993 Kooijmans announced that he would not stand for the election of 1994. He served as a Judge on the International Court of Justice from 1997 to 2006.

On 5 February 2014, Kooijmans' alma mater, the VU, started the Kooijmans Institute.

== Decorations ==
Honours
Ribbon bar	Honour	Country	Date	Comment
	Knight of the Order of the Netherlands Lion	Netherlands	11 April 1978	
	Commander of the Order of Orange-Nassau	Netherlands	8 October 1994	
	Knight of the Order of the Gold Lion of the House of Nassau	Netherlands	20 March 2006	
	Grand Cross of the Order of Merit	Germany	1 July 2007	
Honorific Titles
Ribbon bar	Honour	Country	Date	Comment
	Minister of State	Netherlands	13 July 2007	Style of Excellency

Political offices
Preceded by Tjerk Westerterp	State Secretary for Foreign Affairs; 1973–1977; Served alongside: Laurens Jan Brinkhorst	Succeeded by Durk van der Mei
Preceded by Hans van den Broek	Minister of Foreign Affairs; 1993–1994	Succeeded by Hans van Mierlo
Legal offices
Preceded by Luigi Ferrari Bravo	Judge of the International; Court of Justice; 1997–2006	Succeeded by Kenneth Keith
