= Winsum =

Winsum Wìnzum (Gronings)
- Town and former municipality
- Flag Coat of arms

- Location in Groningen
- Coordinates: 53°20′N 6°31′E
- Country: Netherlands
- Province: Groningen
- Municipality: Het Hogeland

Area
  - Total: 27.82 km^{2} (10.74 sq mi)
- Elevation: 1 m (3.3 ft)

Population (2021)
  - Total: 7,405
  - Density: 266.2/km^{2} (689.4/sq mi)
- Time zone: UTC+1 (CET)
  - Summer (DST): UTC+2 (CEST)
- Postcode: 9951
- Area code: 0595
- Website: www.winsum.nl

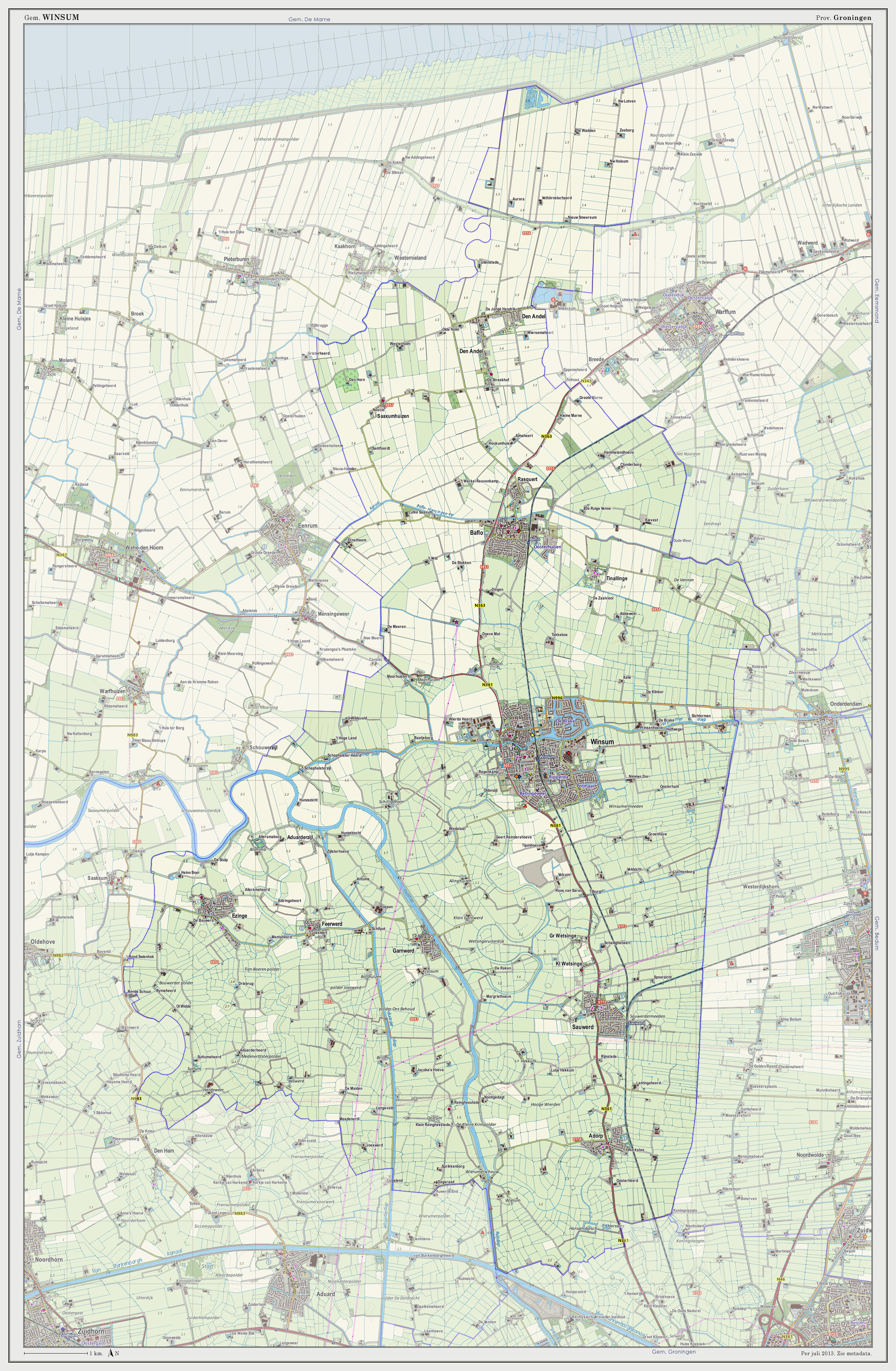
Dutch Topographic map of Winsum, July 2013

Winsum (Dutch: [ˈʋɪnsʏm]; Gronings: Wìnzum [ˈʋɪ̃ːzəm]) is a town and a former municipality in the northeastern Netherlands. On 1 January 2019 the municipality merged with the municipalities of Bedum, De Marne and Eemsmond to form the new municipality Het Hogeland.

The town of Winsum was officially established in 1057 as the fusion of three historic villages: Obergum (North), Winsum (center) and Bellingeweer (South). The majority of the town's 8,000 inhabitants commute to the nearby city Groningen.

The town boasts two traditional Dutch wind mills, two historic churches, two canals, and one of the Netherlands' oldest taverns. The two mills, "De Ster" ("The Star") and "De Vriendschap" ("The Friendship") were built in 1851 and 1801 respectively. The building that the tavern "De Gouden Karper" ("The Golden Carp") now occupies has been in use as a tavern since the 16th century, and is the oldest (unverified) in the Netherlands.

== Twin town ==
Winsum is twinned with

- Lubraniec, Poland

== Sport ==
=== Cycling ===
Winsum hosted the start and finish of stage 4a during the 2012 Energiewacht Tour and the individual time trial (stage 3a) at the 2013 Energiewacht Tour. Due to the success of the 2012 Energiewacht Tour the city became host city for the men's and women's 2013 Dutch National Time Trial Championships on 19 June 2013. The individual time trial at the 2013 Energiewacht Tour took place on the same course.

== Notable people ==
- Rodolphus Agricola (ca.1443–1485) a pre-Erasmian humanist, a Hebrew scholar, an educator, musician and builder of a church organ
- Wigbolt, Baron Ripperda (ca.1535–1573) city governor of Haarlem when the city was under siege in the Eighty Years' War
- Hermanus Numan (1744–1820) painter, draftsman, pastellist, etcher, engraver, watercolorist, art theorist and publisher
- Gezina van der Molen (1892-1978) legal scholar and resistance fighter during the Second World War
- Marcel Pannekoek (born 1986) Dutch footballer
- Ranomi Kromowidjojo (born 1990) Dutch swimmer, triple Olympic champion, winning the gold medals at the 2008 and 2012 Summer Olympics
- Alieke Tuin (born 2001) Dutch footballer

== Gallery ==
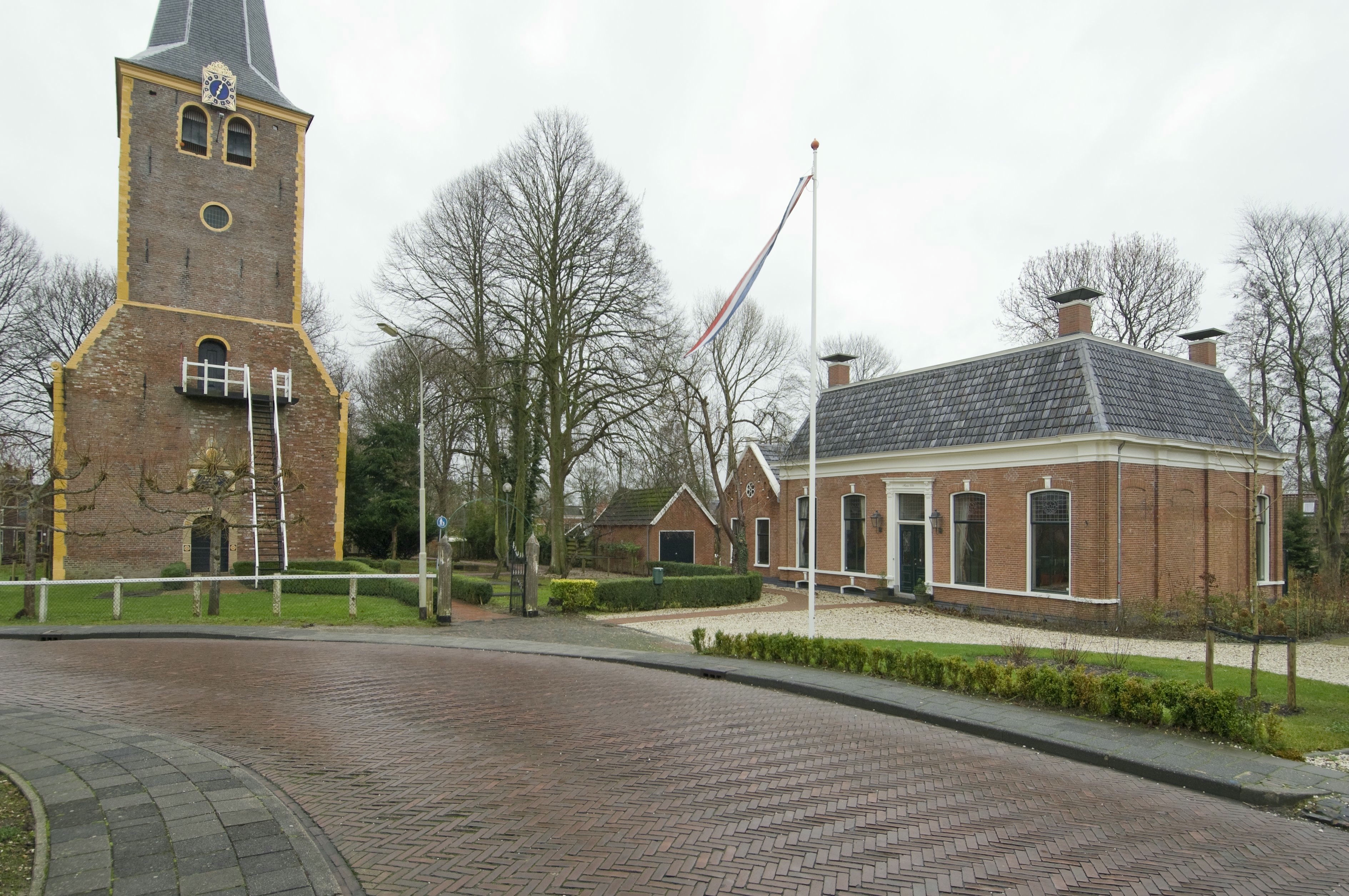
Church and clergy house

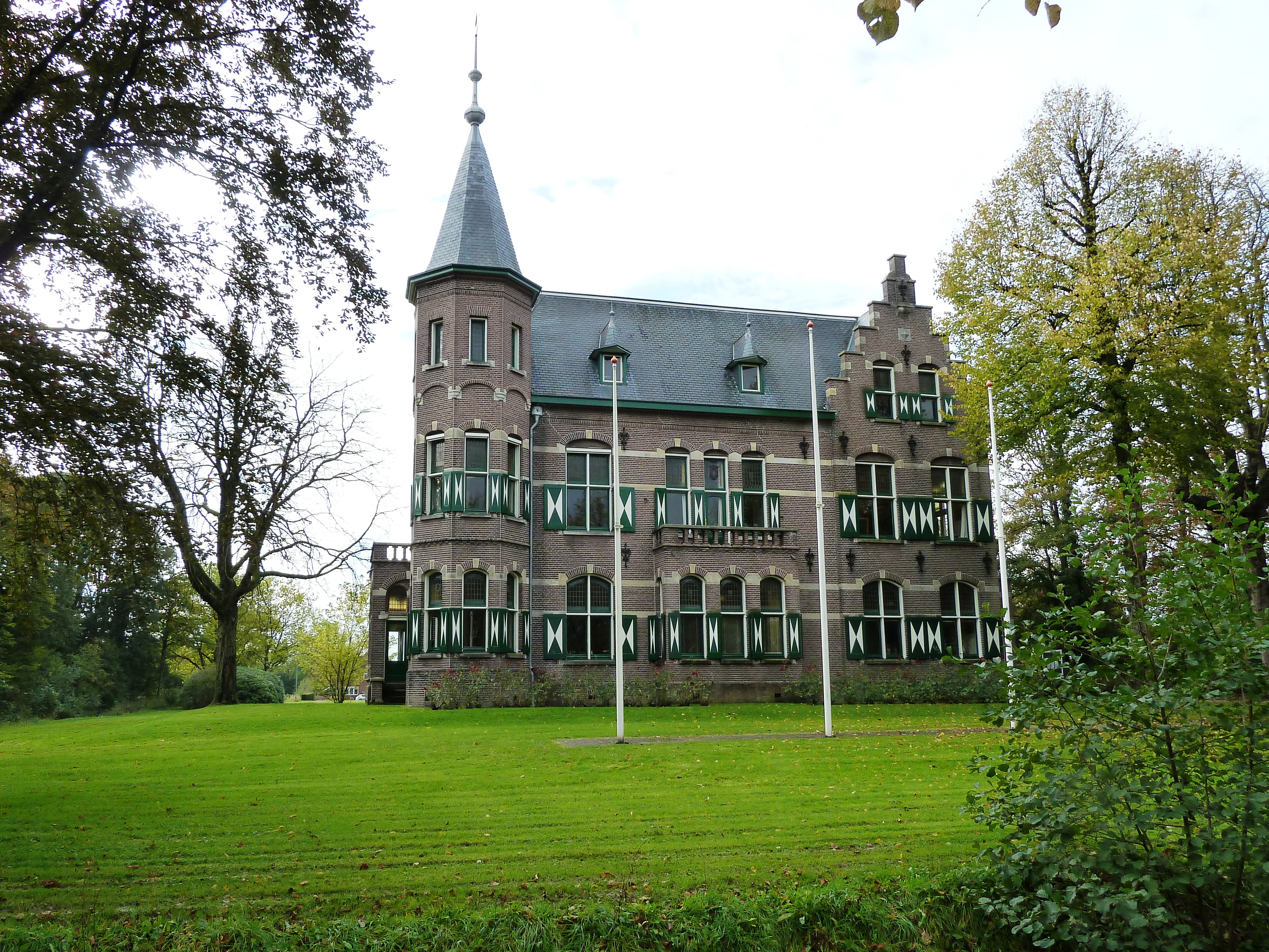
Town hall

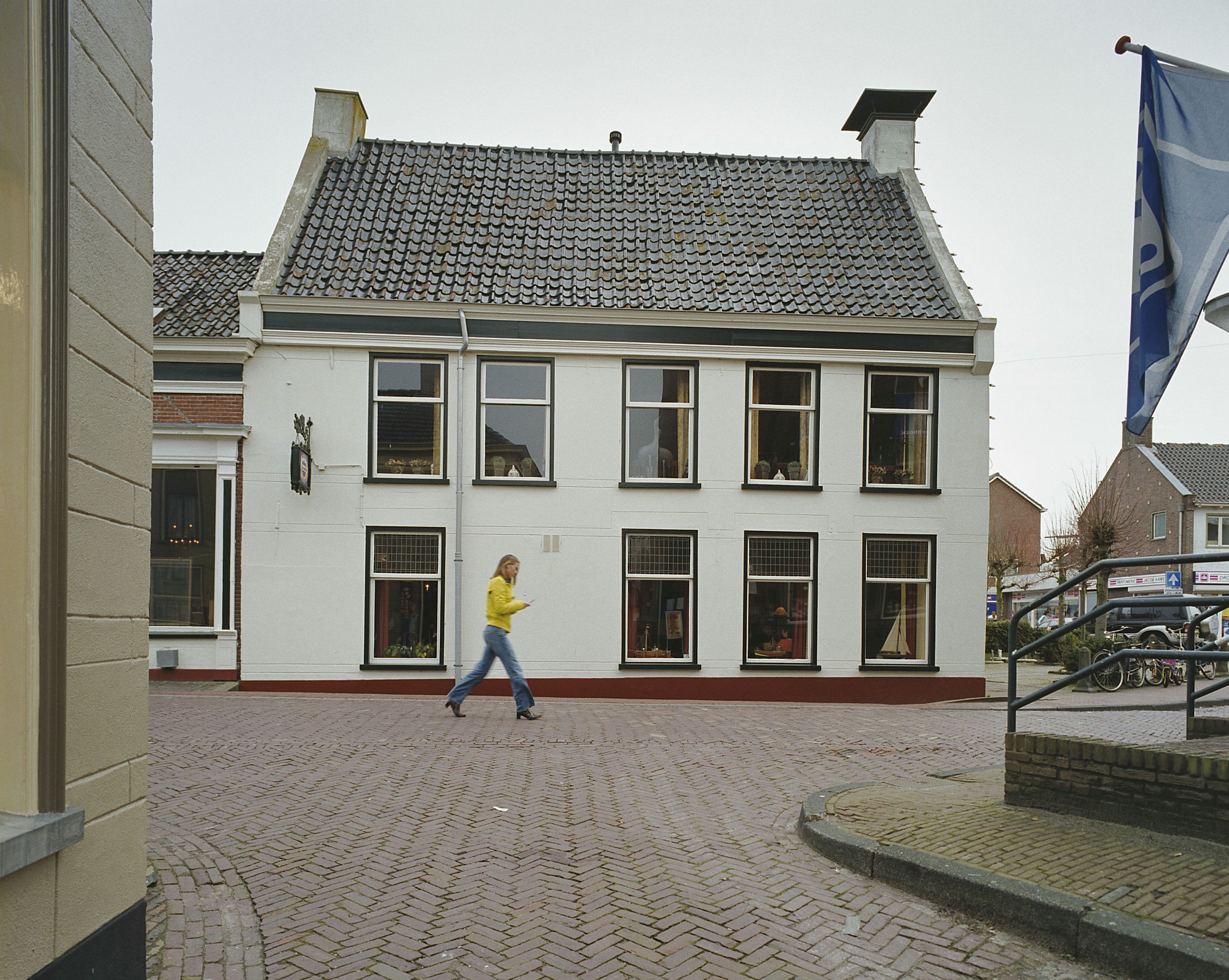
Inn De Gouden Karper

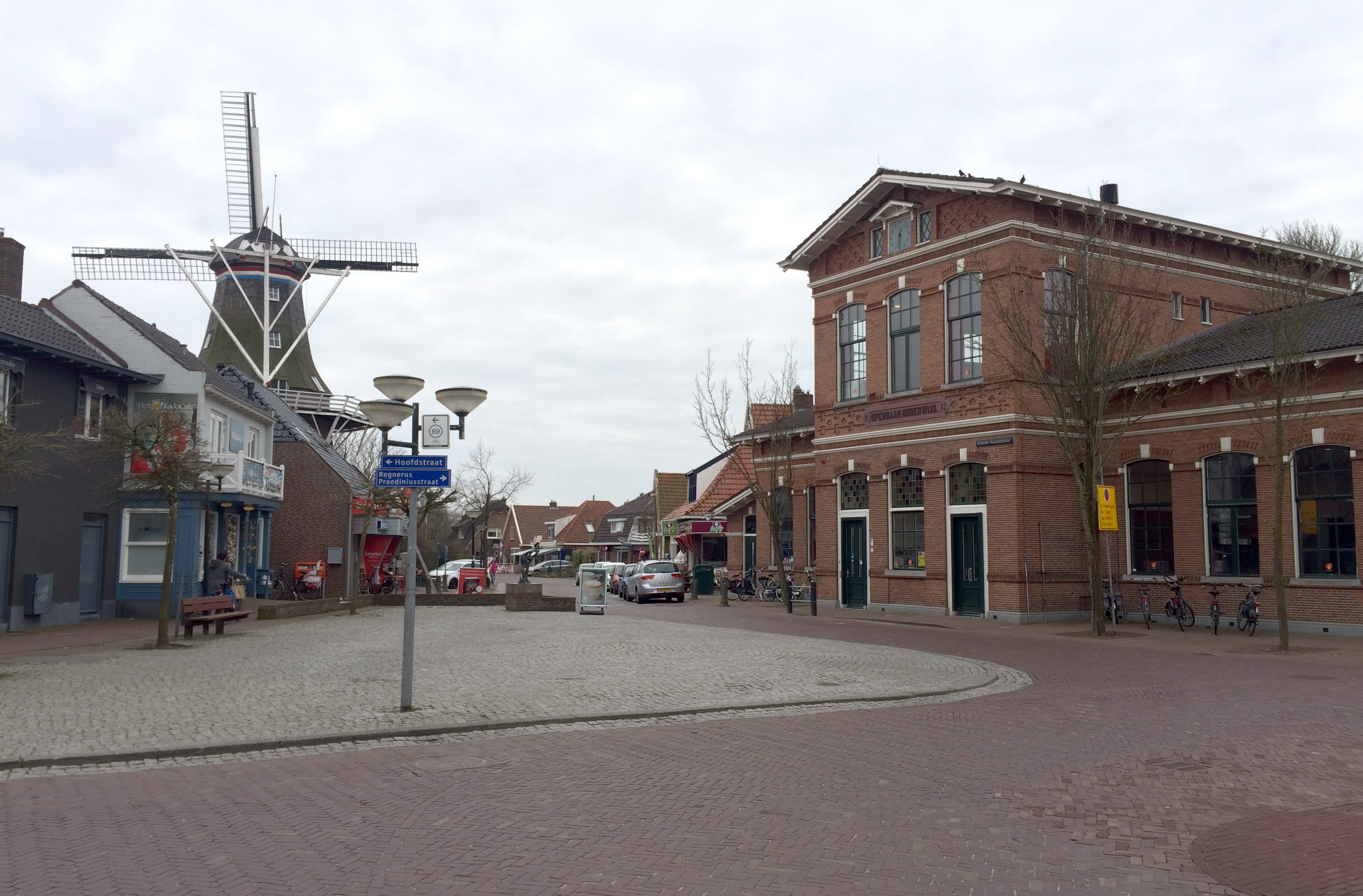
Main street
