= Usquert railway station =

Railway station in the Netherlands

Usquert
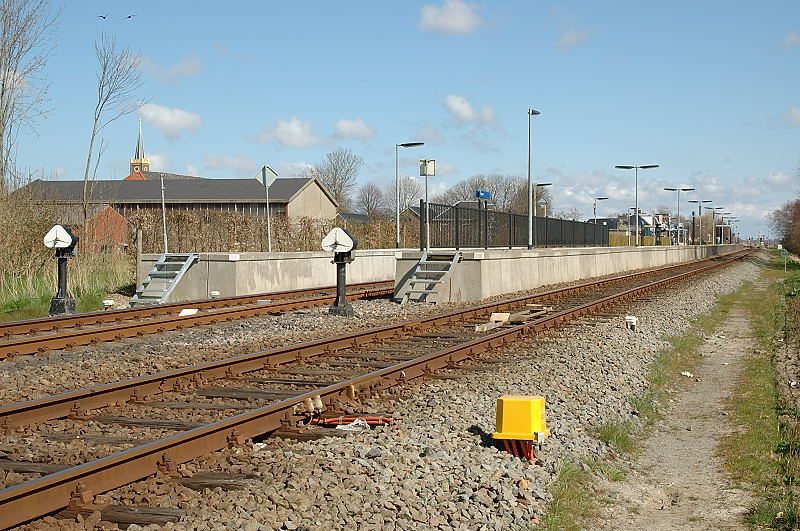

General information
- Location: Netherlands
- Coordinates: 53°24′03″N 6°36′30″E
- Line: Sauwerd–Roodeschool railway

History
- Opened: 16 August 1893

Services
Preceding station	Arriva Netherlands	Following station
Warffum towards Groningen	Stoptrein 37600	Uithuizen towards Eemshaven
Location
- Location within Netherlands

Usquert is a railway station located in Usquert, Netherlands. The station was opened on 16 August 1893 and is located on the Sauwerd–Roodeschool railway. The train services are operated by Arriva.

== Train service ==
The following services currently call at Usquert:

- 2x per hour local service (stoptrein) Groningen - Roodeschool
