= Bellingeweer =

- Village
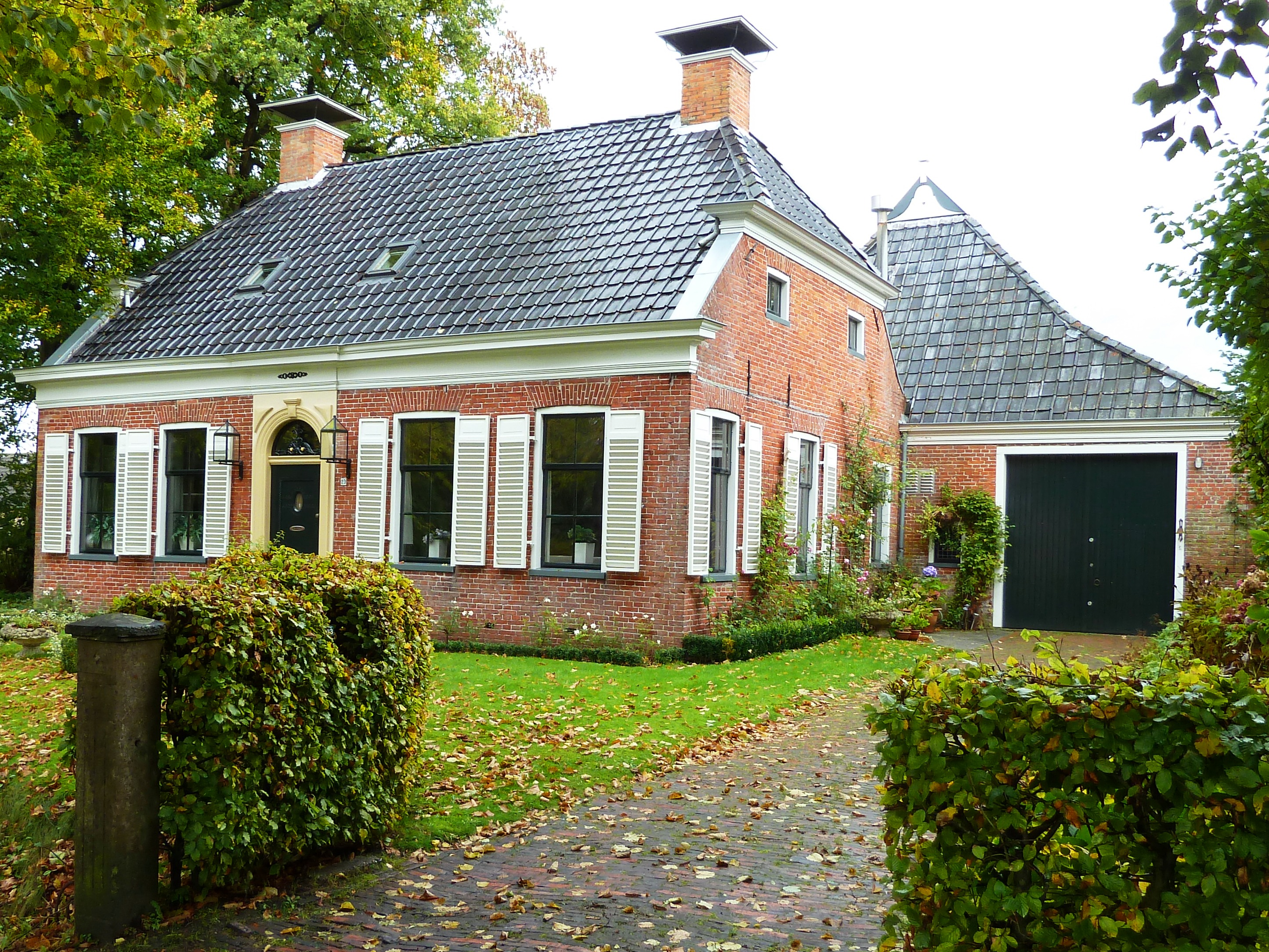
- Typical farmhouse in Bellingeweer

- Location of Bellingeweer in the province of Groningen
- Coordinates: 53°19′35.08″N 6°31′7.73″E
- Country: Netherlands
- Province: Groningen
- Municipality: Het Hogeland

Bellingeweer is part of the town of Winsum, in Groningen, Netherlands. Originally, it was an independent village built on a wierde. Bellingeweer had its own medieval church, which was demolished in 1824. However, the cemetery is still there.

The wierde on which the village is built dates from around the year 1 AD and is still clearly visible.
