= Warffum =

- Village
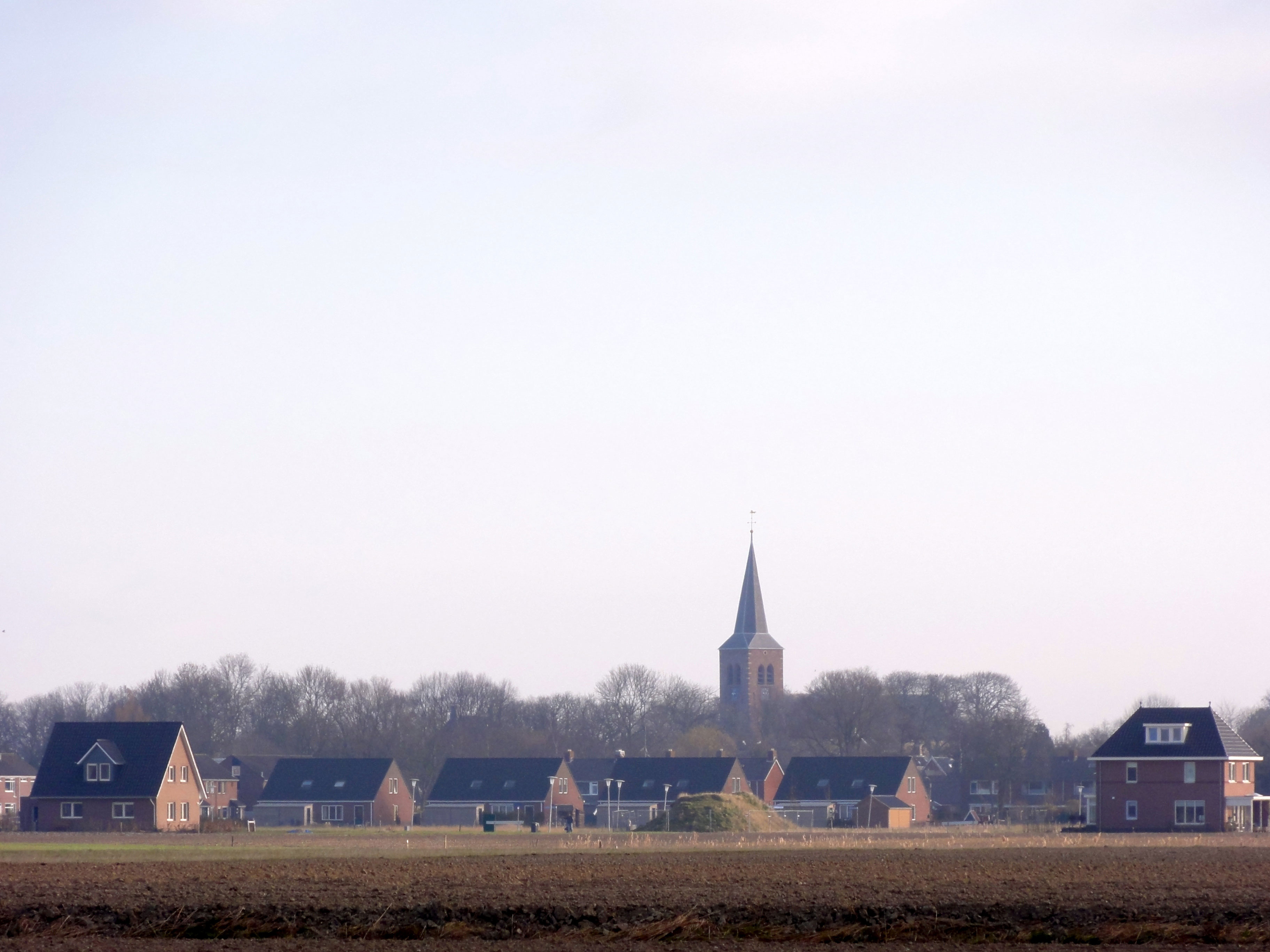
- Warffum in 2011

- Flag Coat of arms

- Location of Warffum in the province of Groningen Warffum (Netherlands)
- Coordinates: 53°23′N 6°33′E
- Country: Netherlands
- Province: Groningen
- Municipality: Het Hogeland

Area
  - Total: 30.78 km^{2} (11.88 sq mi)
- Elevation: 1.9 m (6.2 ft)

Population (2021)
  - Total: 2,180
  - Density: 70.8/km^{2} (183/sq mi)
- Time zone: UTC+1 (CET)
  - Summer (DST): UTC+2 (CEST)
- Postal code: 9989
- Dialing code: 0595

Warffum (Gronings: Waarvum)is a village in the Dutch province of Groningen. It is located in the municipality of Het Hogeland. It had a population of around 2,175 in January 2017.

== History ==
The history of Warffum can be traced back to at least 600 AD, and it has been estimated that the village was founded as far back as the eighth century.

In 1893 a train station was opened in Warffum, connecting Warffum to Groningen and Roodeschool. It was a separate municipality until 1990, when it became a part of Hefshuizen, which has been known as Eemsmond since 1 January 1992.

In 2004 the Dutch royal family visited Warffum as part of the Koninginnedag (Queensday) celebrations.

== Culture ==
The museum Het Hoogeland shows life in Warffum about a hundred-year ago through a collection that includes about fifteen houses. The famous Dutch singer-songwriter Ede Staal was born in Warffum.

Perhaps the biggest annual happening in Warffum is the op Roakeldais festival. This is a folkdance festival that attracts professional dance groups from all over the world.

== Gallery ==
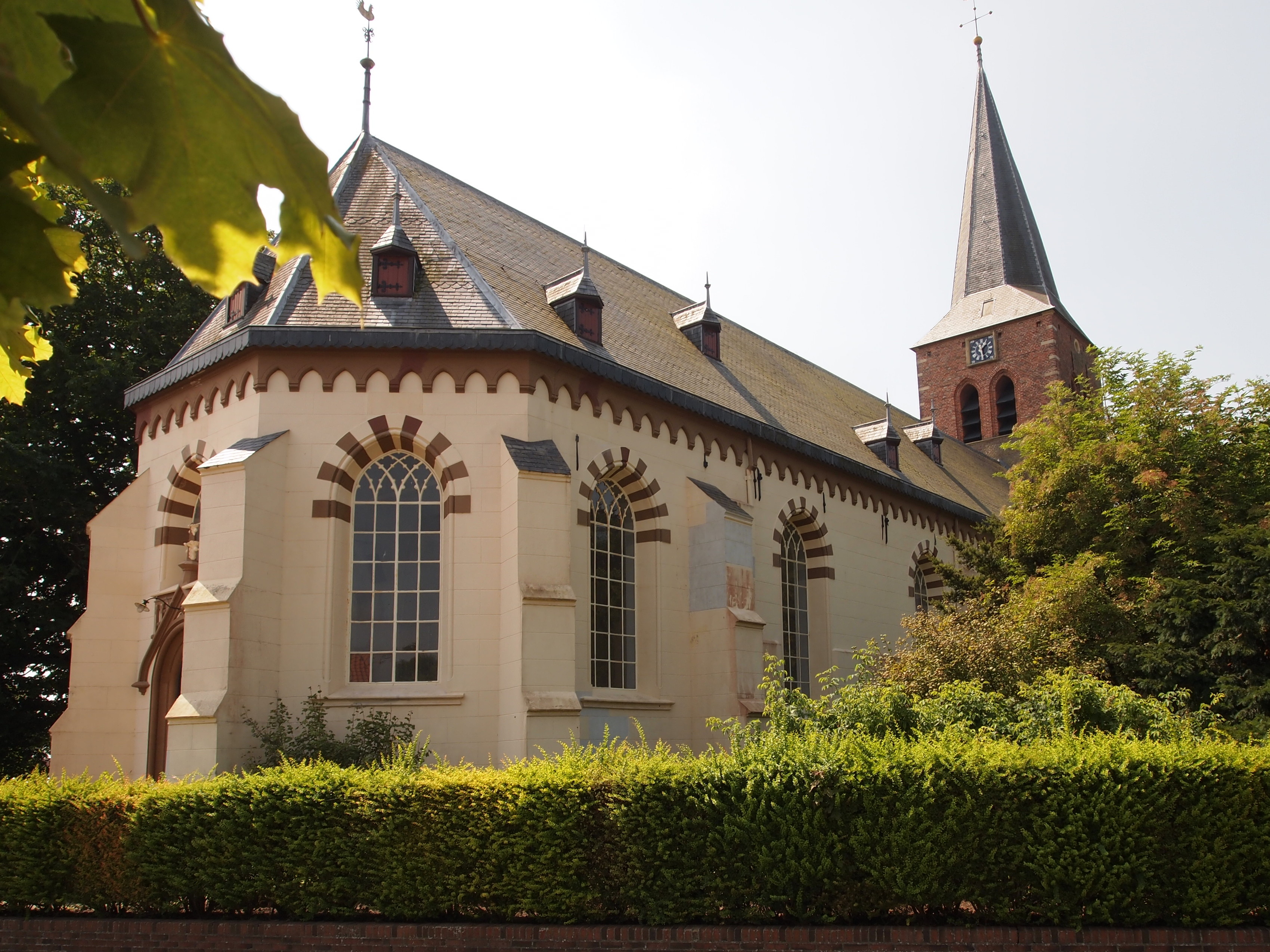
Dutch Reformed church of Warffum

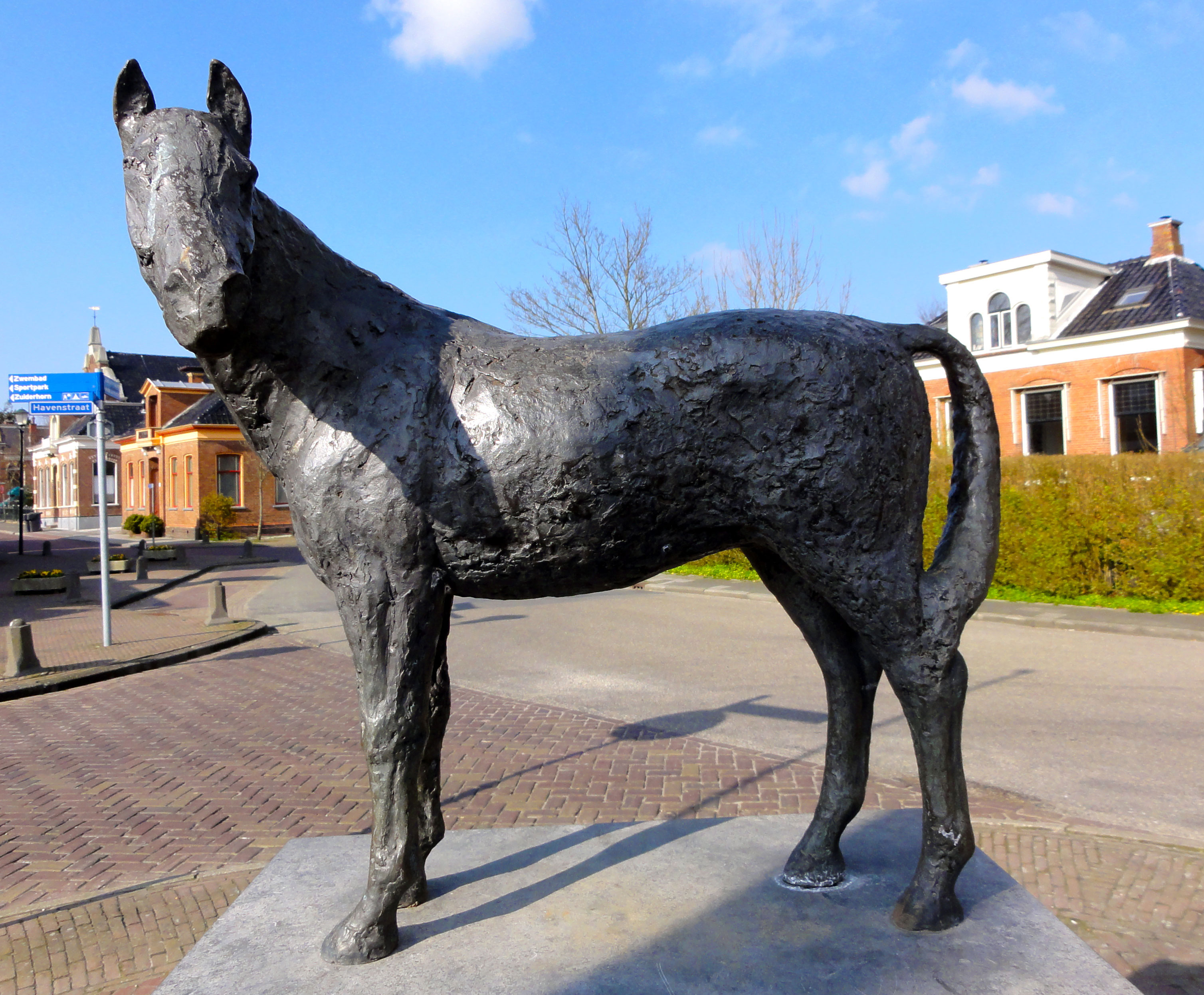
Horse statue

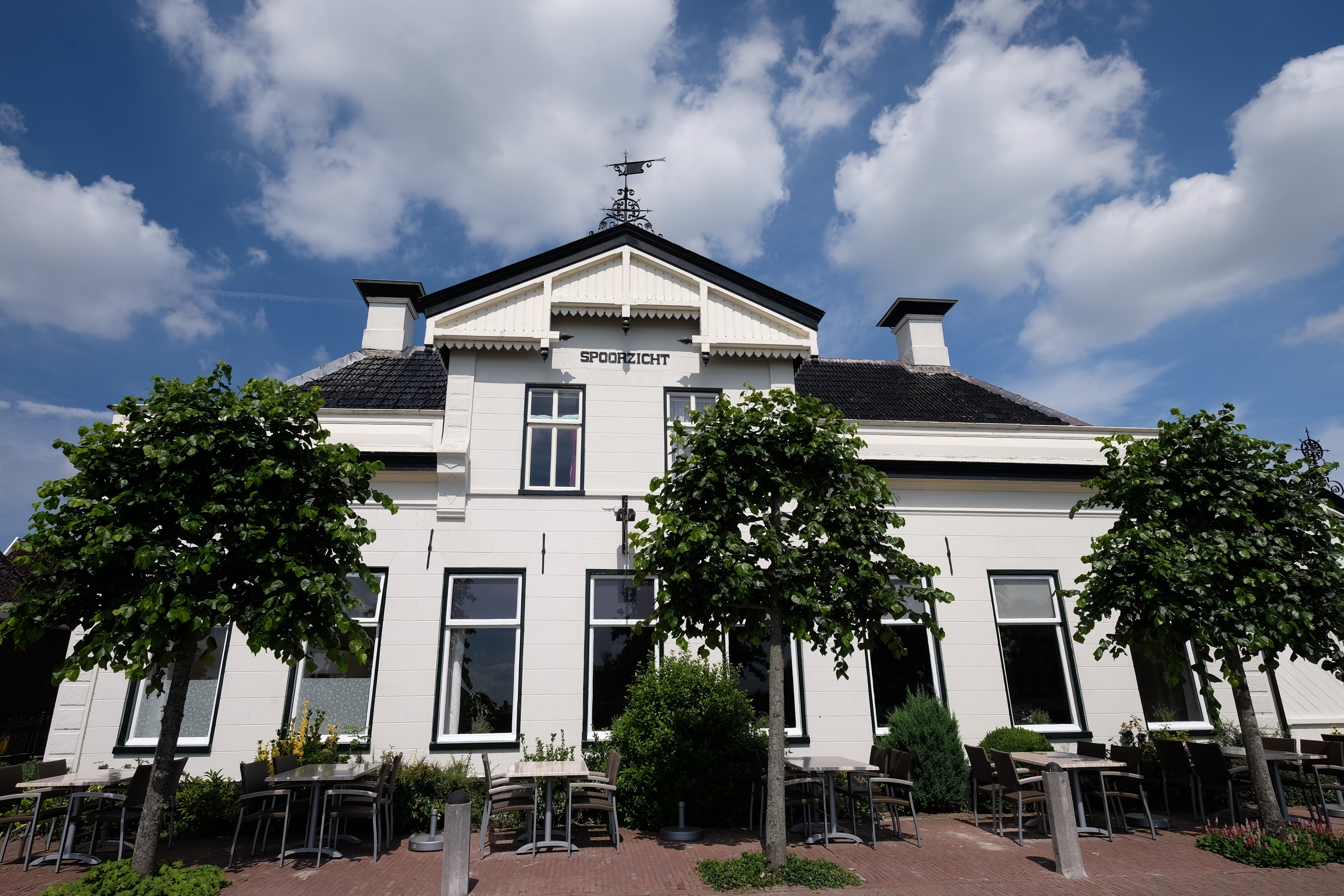
Cafe Spoorzicht

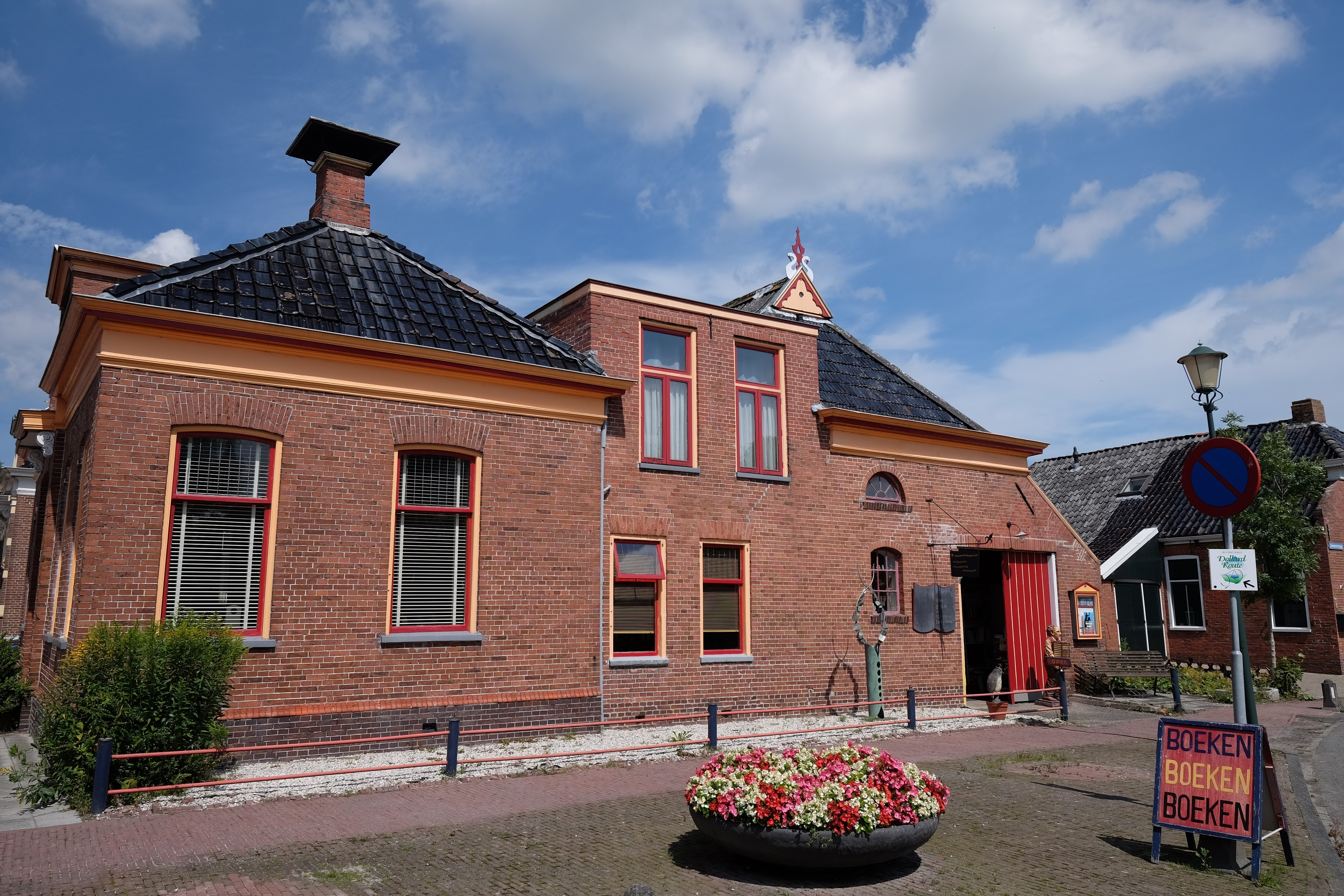
Houses in Warffum
