= Ede Staal =

Background information
- Born: Ede Ulfert Staal; 2 August 1941; Warffum, Netherlands
- Died: 22 July 1986 (aged 44) Delfzijl, Netherlands
- Occupations: Musician, teacher, singer-songwriter
- Years active: 1974–1986
- Website: web.archive.org/web/20180120010842/http://www.edestaal.nl:80/

Ede Ulfert Staal (2 August 1941 – 22 July 1986) was a Dutch singer-songwriter from the Northern province of Groningen who sang mainly in the Gronings dialect.

== Early life ==
Ede Staal was born in 1941 in Warffum, the son of a NSB-father (National Socialist) and a farmer's daughter. His father worked as a teacher, and his eldest son Ede would later follow in his footsteps by becoming a teacher himself.

== Career ==
At the age of five, Staal started making music. He was inspired by his grandfather who had worked as a musical director in Leens, where he grew up.

His breakthrough came in 1974 with the song "I'm in the blues". He initially sang in English, having studied that language at university.

In 1981, he began singing in the Gronings dialect, and became well known with the comical song "Mien toentje" (My little garden) as well as with "t Het nog nooit zo donker west" (It has never been so dark before). One of his last songs was the emotional "Mien hogelaand" (My high land) in which Staal sang of his love for the region where he grew up.

== Awards ==
Staal was scheduled to receive the K. ter Laanprijs for his efforts to promote the local language. Because of his death in July, it was his wife who received the prize on 4 October 1986.

== Personal life ==
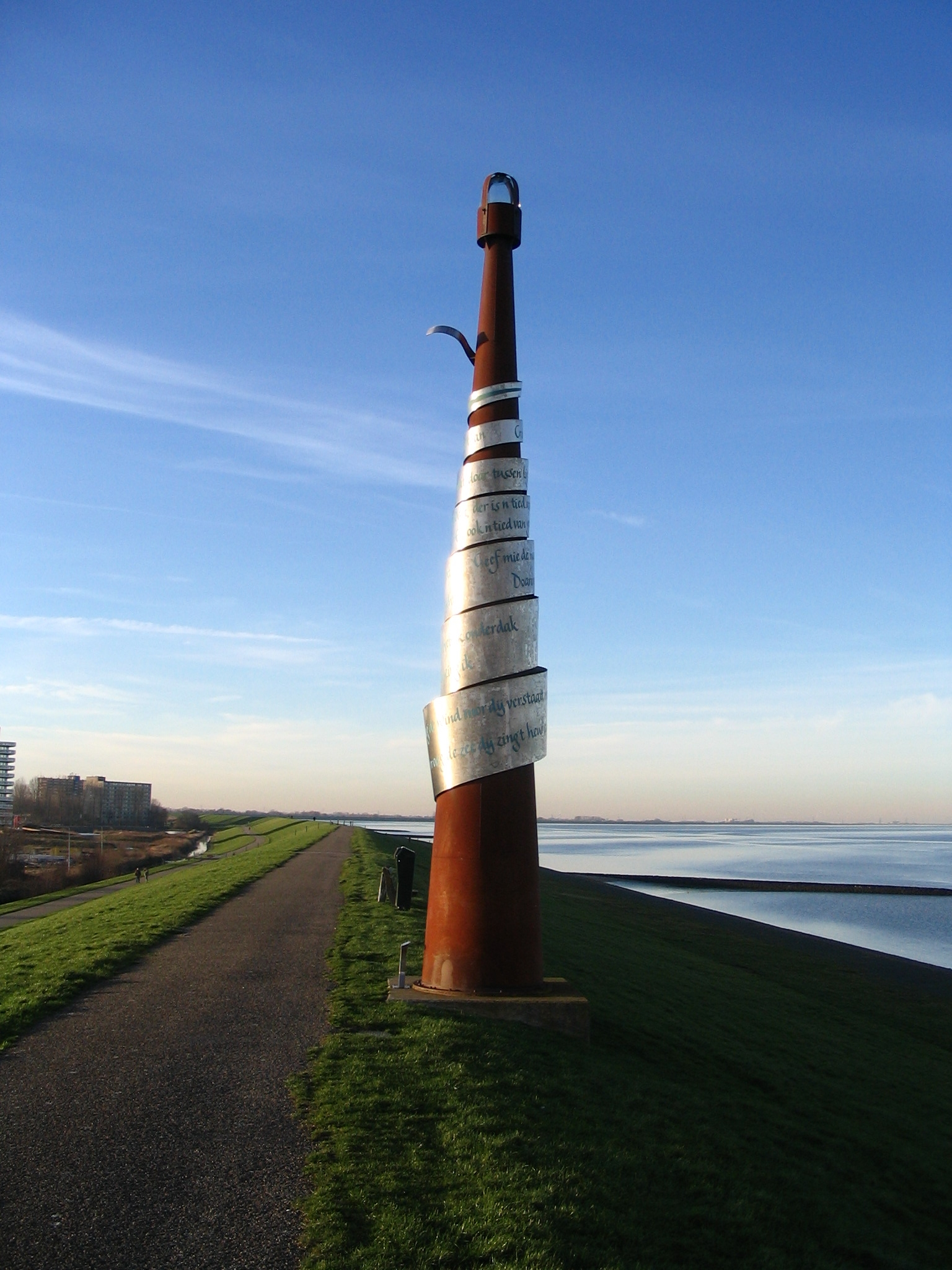
A monument built in Staal's honour near Delfzijl

Staal was an English teacher at a local high school. He married Fieke Spoel and fathered six sons. They lived on several farms throughout the province of Groningen.

Staal died of cancer in Delfzijl, aged 44, at the height of his fame. He is still famous in his homeland and also has a following outside the Netherlands.

== Legacy ==
After his death, Staal became an iconic figure in the province of Groningen. A monument was erected in his honour near Delfzijl, where he died at his farm in 1986. His music was translated into several languages, and one of his songs, "Termunterziel" was even played in Japan.

== Discography ==
=== MC ===
- "Mien toentje"
- "Zuzooien op zundagmörn" (1986)

=== Single 7" ===
- "I'm in the blues / Hear my song" (1974)
- "Mien Toentje / Man, man, wat n boudel" (1983)

=== EP ===
- "Het het nog nooit zo donker west" (1984)

=== LPs ===
- "Mien toentje" (1984)
- "As vaaier woorden" (1986)

=== Mini CDs ===
- "Zalstoe altied bie mie blieven" (1997)
- "Credo – Mien bestoan" (1997)
- "I'm in the blues / Hear my song" (2005)

=== CDs ===
- "Mien toentje" (1984)
- "As vaaier woorden" (1986)
- "Zuzooien op zundagmörn" (1993)
- "As t boeten störmt / Hear my song" (1996)
- "Doarom zing ik" (2005)
- "Getekend" (2006)

=== Compilations ===
- "Heur es aan!" (Bureau Groninger Taal en Cultuur, RuG, 1999)
- "De grootste Groninger hits van RTV Noord" (RTV Noord/Marista, 2006)
- "Kennismaking met het Gronings" (lecture notes with CD, 2007)

=== Video ===
- "Zo moutve t holden"

=== DVDs ===
- "Ede Staal" (2004)
- "Ede Staal, Live " (2005)
- "Credo, zien bestoan" (2011)
