= Durk van der Mei =

Dutch politician (1924–2018)

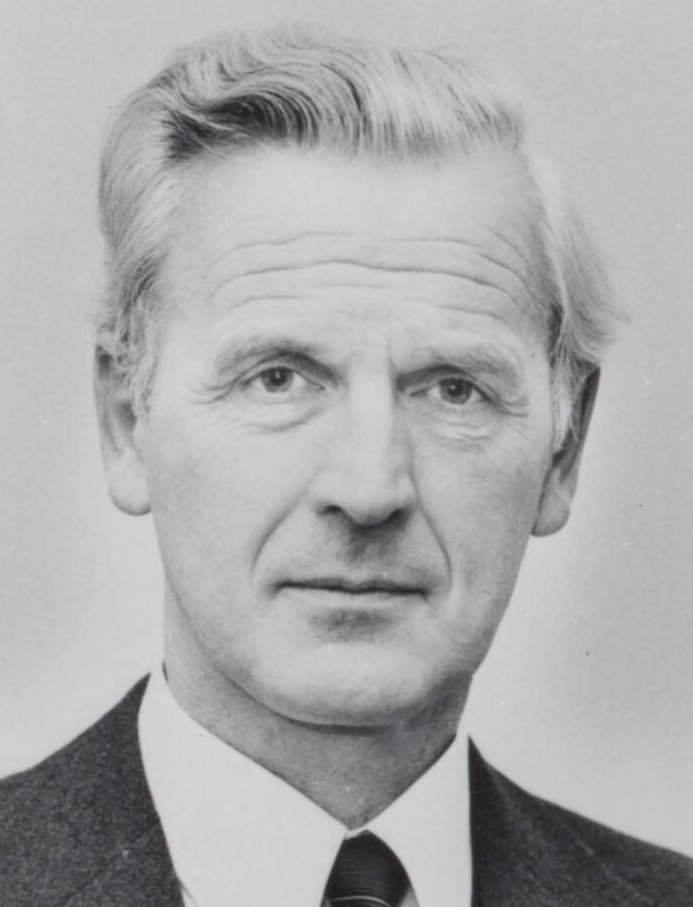
- Van der Mei in 1977

State Secretary for Foreign Affairs
- In office 28 December 1977 – 11 September 1981
- Prime Minister: Dries van Agt
- Preceded by: Laurens Jan Brinkhorst; Pieter Kooijmans
- Succeeded by: Hans van den Broek

Member of the European Parliament
- In office 9 March 1976 – 30 December 1977
- Parliamentary group: Christian Democratic Group
- Constituency: Netherlands

Member of the House of Representatives
- In office 11 November 1982 – 26 June 1984
- In office 15 September 1981 – 16 September 1982
- Parliamentary group: Christian Democratic Appeal
- In office 3 August 1971 – 28 December 1977
- In office 6 November 1956 – 10 May 1971
- Parliamentary group: Christian Historical Union

Personal details
- Born: Durk Frederik van der Mei; 13 October 1924 Brummen, Netherlands
- Died: 2 February 2018 (aged 93) Zutphen, Netherlands
- Party: Christian Democratic Appeal (from 1980)
- Other political affiliations: Christian Historical Union (until 1980)
- Education: University of Amsterdam (Bachelor of Economics, Master of Economics)
- Occupation: Politician; Economist; Trade association executive; Nonprofit director; Lobbyist; Activist

Durk Frederik van der Mei (13 October 1924 – 2 February 2018) was a Dutch politician of the Christian Historical Union (CHU) and Christian Democratic Appeal (CDA). He served as State Secretary for Foreign Affairs from 1977 until 1981.

Political offices
Preceded by Laurens Jan Brinkhorst; Pieter Kooijmans	State Secretary for Foreign Affairs; 1977–1981	Succeeded by Hans van den Broek
