= Obergum =

- Village
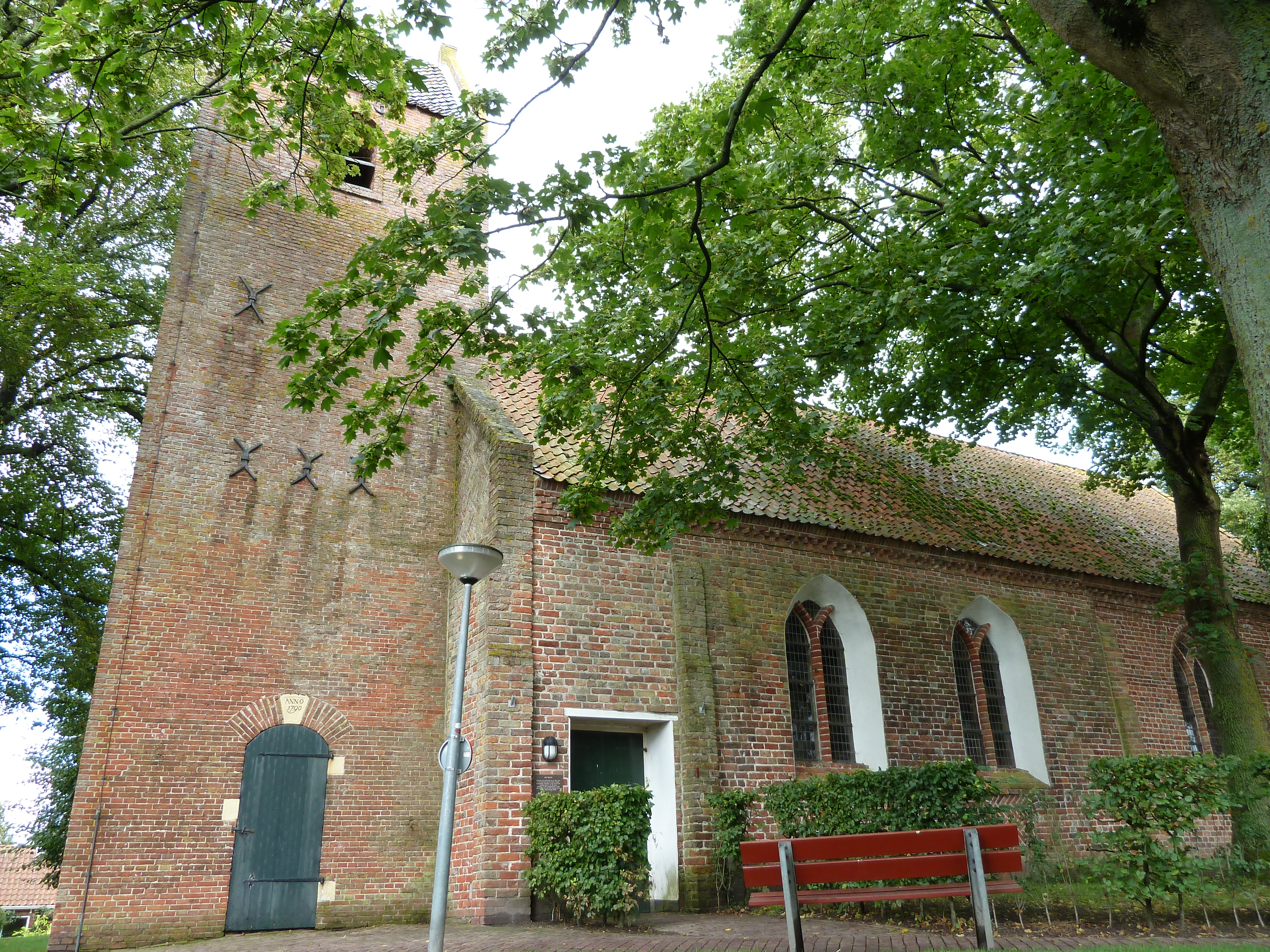
- The church of Obergum

- Location of Obergum in Groningen in the Netherlands Obergum (Netherlands)
- Coordinates: 53°20′6″N 6°30′54″E
- Country: Netherlands
- Province: Groningen
- Municipality: Het Hogeland

Obergum is part of the town Winsum (Groningen, Netherlands) that lies north of the Winsumerdiep. Originally it was a separate village. Winsum and Obergum have been connected since 1808 by the bridge De Boog (The Arch).

The village is built around a wierde (hill) on which a 13th-century Romanesque church stands, called the St. Nicholas Chapel.
