= Warffum railway station =

Railway station in the Netherlands

Warffum
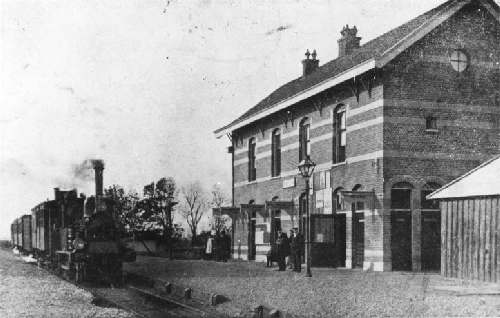

General information
- Location: Netherlands
- Coordinates: 53°23′23″N 6°33′59″E
- Line: Sauwerd–Roodeschool railway

Other information
- Station code: Wfm

History
- Opened: 16 August 1893

Services
Preceding station	Arriva Netherlands	Following station
Baflo towards Groningen	Stoptrein 37600	Usquert towards Eemshaven
Location
- Location within Netherlands

Warffum is a railway station located in Warffum in the Netherlands. The station was opened on 16 August 1893 and is located on the Sauwerd–Roodeschool railway. The train services are operated by Arriva.

== Train service ==
The following services currently call at Warffum:

- 2x per hour local service (stoptrein) Groningen - Roodeschool
