= Baflo railway station =

Railway station in Baflo, Netherlands

Baflo
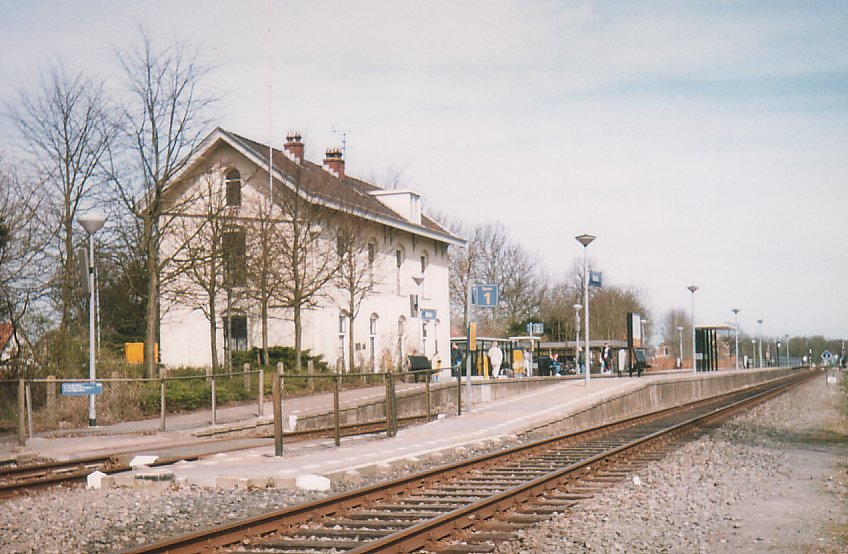
- Baflo railway station in 1997

General information
- Location: Baflo, Netherlands
- Coordinates: 53°21′39″N 6°31′06″E
- Owner: NS Stations
- Line: Sauwerd–Roodeschool railway
- Train operators: Arriva

Other information
- Station code: Bf

History
- Opened: 16 August 1893

Services
Preceding station	Arriva Netherlands	Following station
Winsum towards Groningen	Stoptrein 37600	Warffum towards Eemshaven
Location
- Location within Netherlands

Baflo (Dutch pronunciation: [ˈbɑfloː]; abbreviation: Bf) is a railway station located in Baflo, Netherlands. The station was opened on 16 August 1893 and is located on the Sauwerd–Roodeschool railway. The station is operated by Arriva.

== Train service ==
The following services currently call at Baflo:

- 2x per hour local service (stoptrein) Groningen - Roodeschool
