= Hans van den Broek =

Dutch politician and diplomat (1936–2025)

His Excellency Hans van den Broek
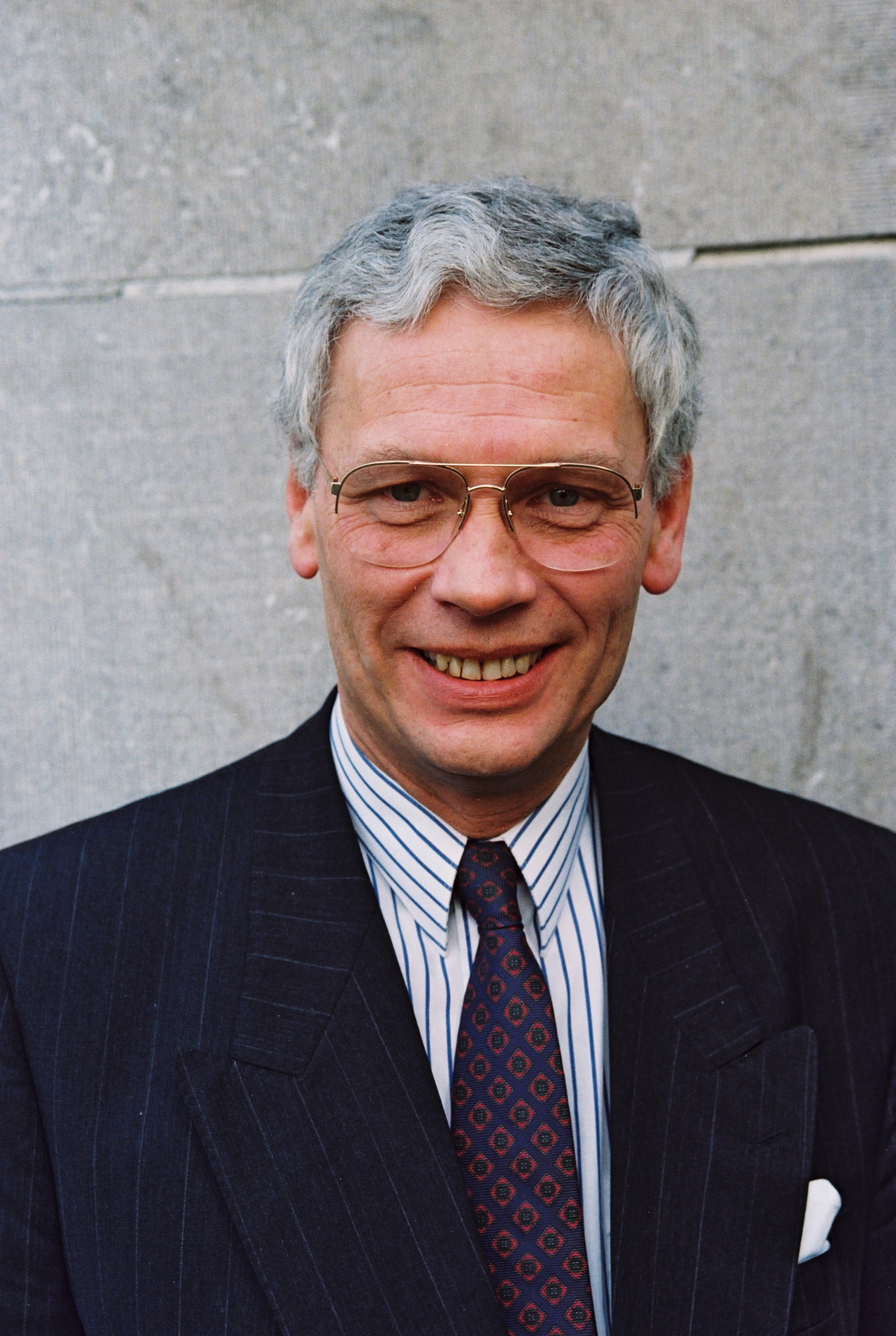
- Van den Broek in 1992

European Commissioner (Note: External Relations, Enlargement and European Neighbourhood Policy (1995–1999) External Relations and Enlargement (1993–1995))
- In office 6 January 1993 – 16 September 1999
- President: See list: Jacques Delors (1993–1995) Jacques Santer (1995–1999) Manuel Marín (1999)
- Preceded by: Frans Andriessen
- Succeeded by: Frits Bolkestein

Minister of Foreign Affairs
- In office 4 November 1982 – 3 January 1993
- Prime Minister: Ruud Lubbers
- Preceded by: Dries van Agt
- Succeeded by: Pieter Kooijmans

State Secretary for Foreign Affairs
- In office 11 September 1981 – 4 November 1982
- Prime Minister: Dries van Agt
- Preceded by: Durk van der Mei
- Succeeded by: Wim van Eekelen

Member of the House of Representatives
- In office 14 September 1989 – 7 November 1989
- In office 3 June 1986 – 14 July 1986
- In office 16 September 1982 – 4 November 1982
- In office 12 October 1976 – 11 September 1981
- Parliamentary group: Christian Democratic Appeal (1980–1989); Catholic People's Party (1976–1980)

Personal details
- Born: Henri van den Broek; 11 December 1936 Paris, France
- Died: 22 February 2025 (aged 88)
- Citizenship: Netherlands
- Party: Christian Democratic Appeal (from 1980)
- Other political affiliations: Catholic People's Party (until 1980)
- Spouse: Josée van Schendel (m. 1966)
- Children: Princess Marilène (born 1970) and 1 other daughter
- Relatives: Prince Maurits (son-in-law)
- Education: Utrecht University (LL.B., LL.M.)
- Occupation: Politician; diplomat; jurist; lawyer; prosecutor; businessperson; corporate director; nonprofit director; lobbyist · activist

Military service
- Allegiance: Netherlands
- Branch/service: Royal Netherlands Army
- Years of service: 1965–1966 (Conscription); 1966–1967 (Reserve)
- Rank: Captain
- Unit: Regiment Huzaren van Boreel
- Hans van den Broek's voice Van den Broek explaining European Union diplomacy in the Balkans after the Kosovo War; Recorded 4 June 1999

Henri "Hans" van den Broek (Dutch pronunciation: [ˈɦɛnri ˈɦɑns fɑn də(m) ˈbruk]; (Note: In isolation, van and den are pronounced [vɑn] and [dɛn], respectively.) 11 December 1936 – 22 February 2025) was a Dutch politician and diplomat of the defunct Catholic People's Party (KVP) and later the Christian Democratic Appeal (CDA) party and jurist who served as European Commissioner from 6 January 1993 until 16 September 1999.

Van den Broek studied Law at the Utrecht University obtaining a Master of Laws degree. Van den Broek worked as a lawyer in Rotterdam from May 1965 until September 1968 and as a corporate director at a company in Ede from September 1968 until October 1976. Van den Broek became a Member of the House of Representatives on 12 October 1976 serving as a frontbencher and spokesperson for Justice. After the election of 1981 Van den Broek was appointed State Secretary for Foreign Affairs in the Cabinet Van Agt II taking office on 11 September 1981. The Cabinet Van Agt II fell just seven months into its term and was replaced by the caretaker Cabinet Van Agt III with Van den Broek retaining his position. After the election of 1982 Van den Broek was appointed Minister of Foreign Affairs taking office on 4 November 1982. After the elections of 1986 and 1989 Van den Broek continued his office in the Cabinets Lubbers II and III.

In November 1992 Van den Broek was nominated as the next European Commissioner in the Third Delors Commission, and was given the heavy portfolios of External Relations and Enlargement taking office on 6 January 1993. In November 1994 Van den Broek was re-nominated for a second term in the Santer Commission, and kept his previous portfolios with addition of Neighbourhood Policy serving from 25 January 1995 until 16 September 1999.

Van den Broek retired from active politics at 62 and became active in the private and public sectors as a corporate and non-profit director and served on several state commissions and councils on behalf of the government and as an occasional diplomat for economic and diplomatic delegations. Following his retirement Van den Broek continued to be active as an advocate and lobbyist for Human rights, nuclear disarmament and for more European integration. Van den Broek was known for his abilities as a skillful negotiator and effective mediator. Van den Broek was granted the honorary title of Minister of State on 25 February 2005 and continued to comment on political affairs as a statesman until his retirement in 2010.

== Early life and education ==
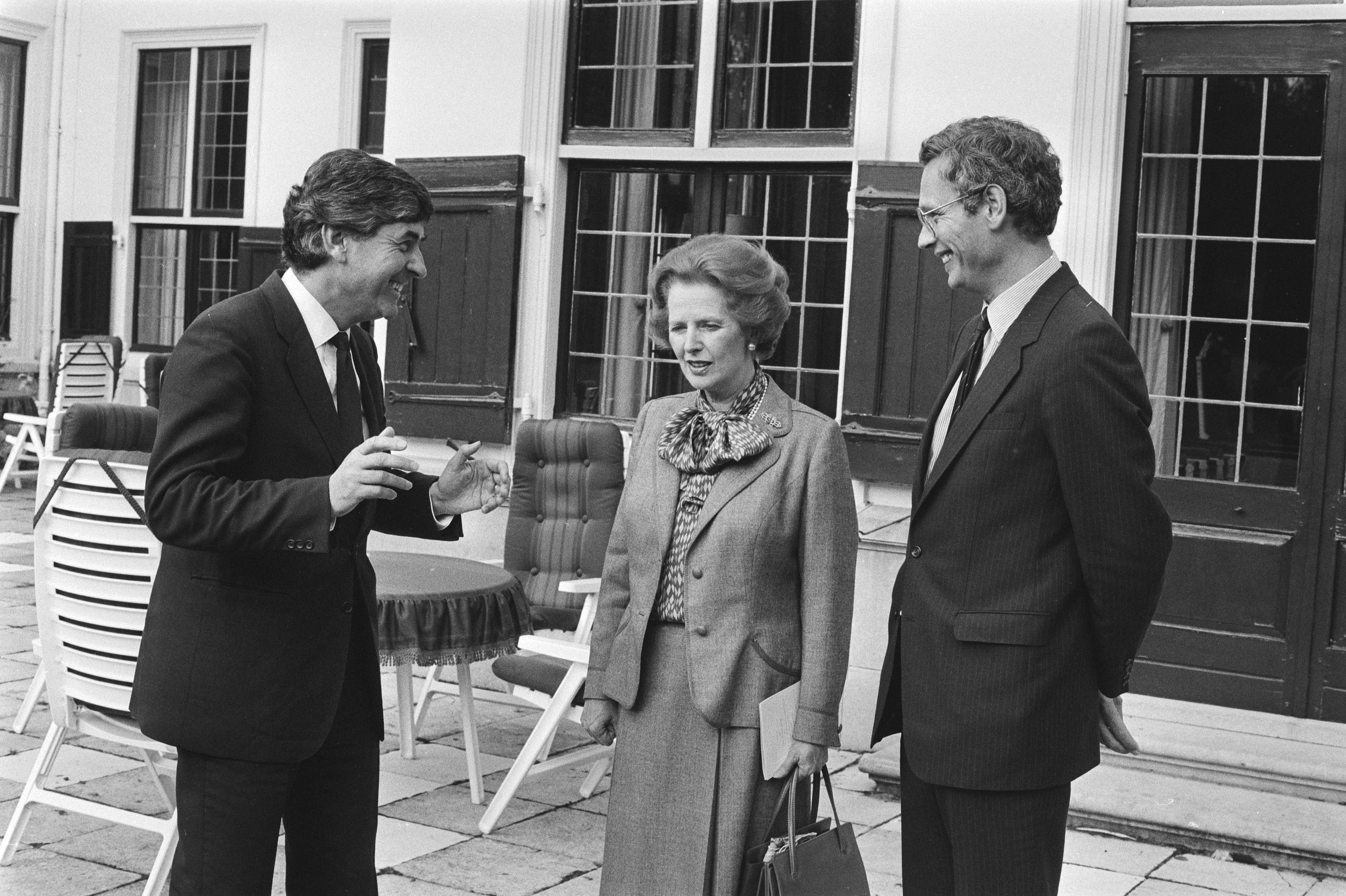
Prime Minister Ruud Lubbers, Prime Minister of the United Kingdom Margaret Thatcher and Minister Hans van den Broek at the Catshuis on 19 September 1983.

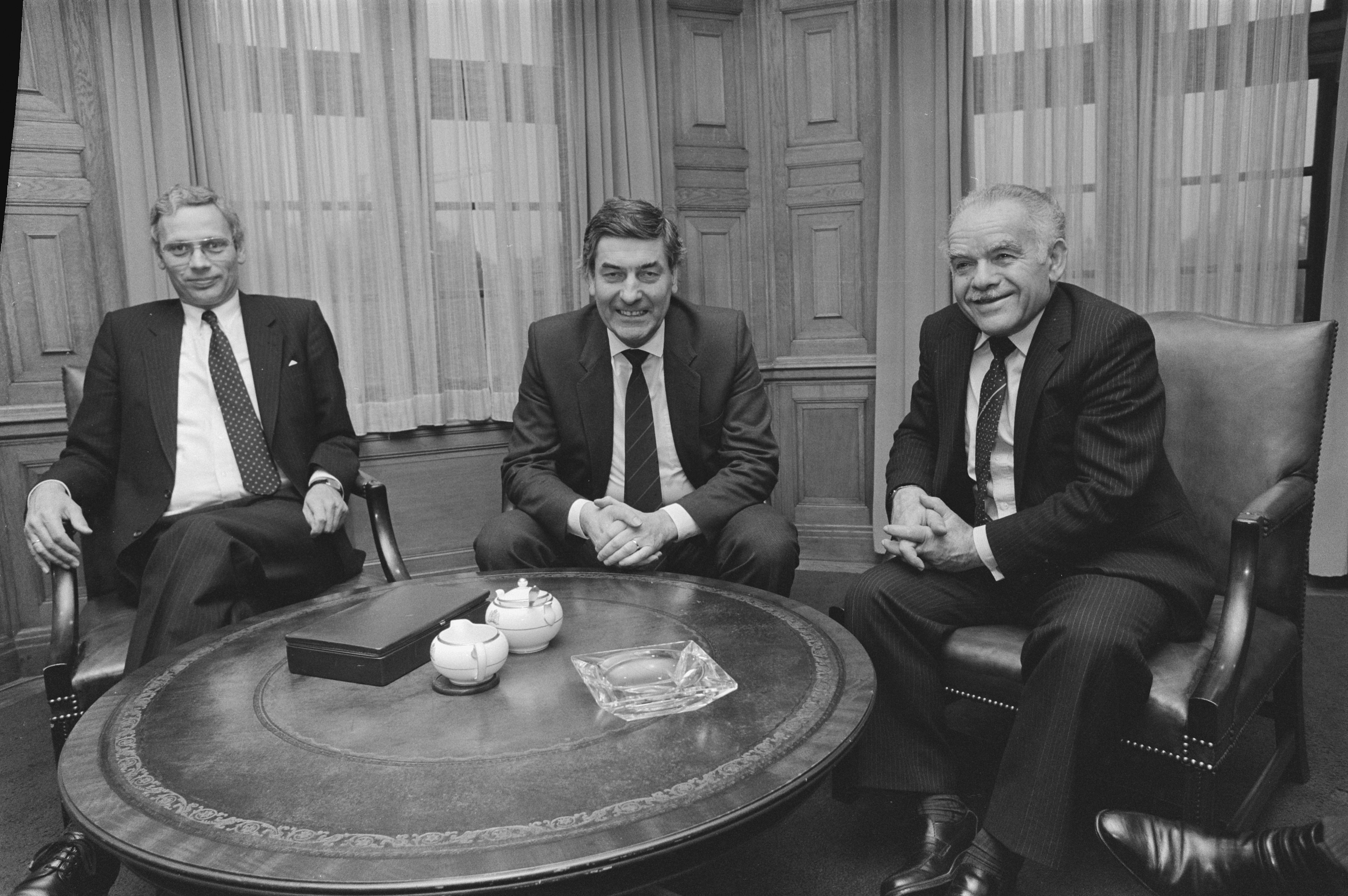
Minister Hans van den Broek, Prime Minister Ruud Lubbers and Israeli Minister of Foreign Affairs Yitzhak Shamir at the Torentje on 28 February 1985.

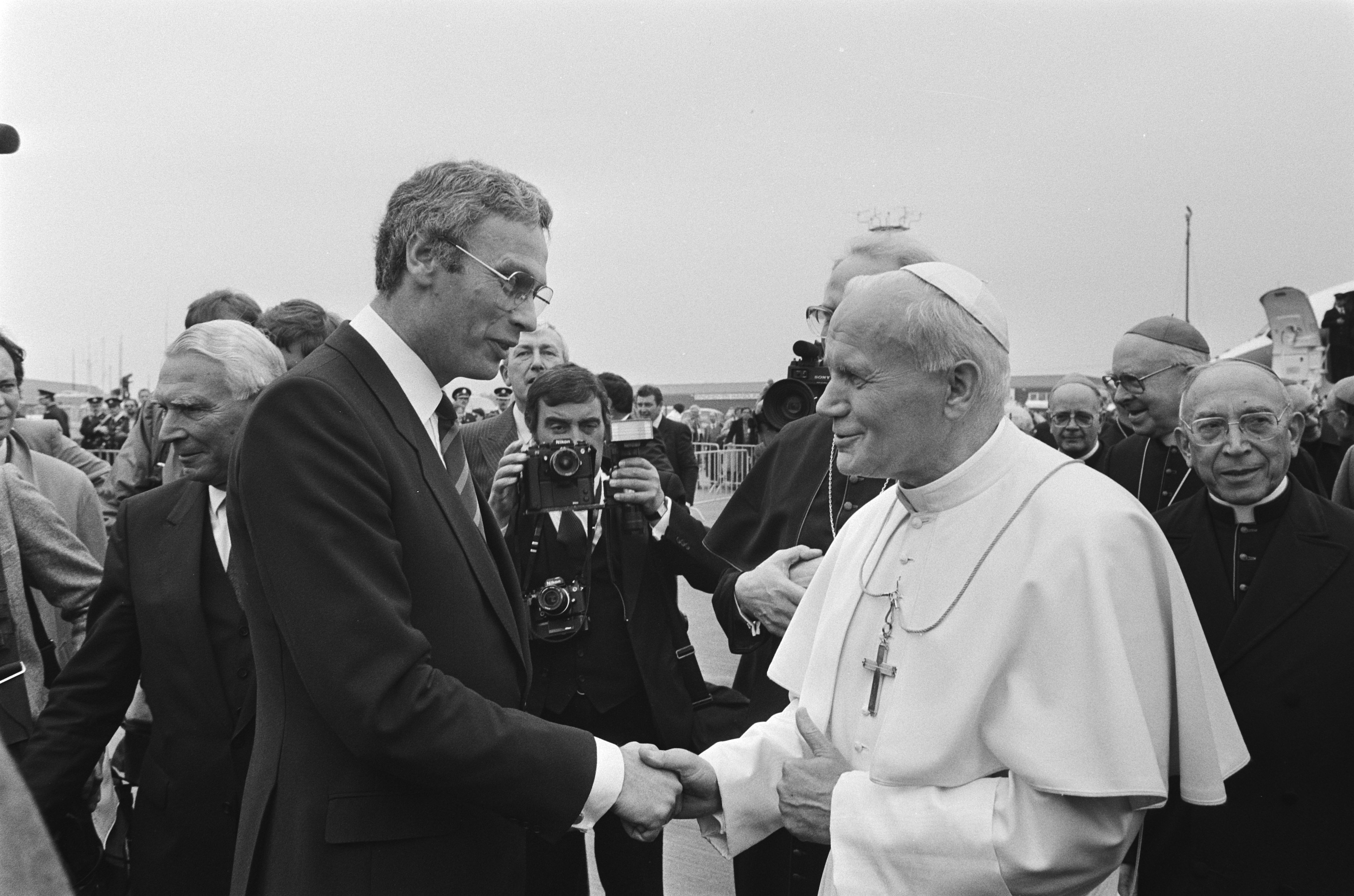
Minister Hans van den Broek and Pope John Paul II at the Eindhoven Airport on 11 May 1985.

Henri van den Broek was born on 11 December 1936 in Paris in France. His father was Hendrik Johannes van den Broek and his mother was Maria Alberta Antonia Roest.

Van den Broek went to the Roman Catholic secondary school Lyceum voor het Gooi in Hilversum. He studied Dutch law at Utrecht University, where he received his master's degree (Master of Law) in 1965.

He began his career as a lawyer joining the Katholieke Volkspartij (KVP) and was member of the municipal council of Rheden between 1970 and 1974. Between 1976 and 1981 he was member of the House of Representatives, the lower house of the Dutch parliament, as representative of the KVP and later of the Christen-Democratisch Appèl (CDA). He was Netherlands Minister for Foreign Affairs in the governments of Ruud Lubbers three times and in 1991 was one of the EU negotiators of the Brioni Agreement, which ended the ten-day war in Slovenia. Major aspects of his time in office included massive demonstration in The Hague (1983) against the planned installation in the Netherlands of nuclear-armed U.S. cruise missiles (which was cancelled after all due to arms reduction talks between the US and the Soviet Union). On 6 January 1993 he became a member of the European Commission, once again with responsibility for foreign relations, especially the Enlargement of the European Union. He remained in that post until March 1999, when he retired from European politics.

On 25 February 2005, he was granted the honorary title of Minister of State.

Van den Broek was president of the Netherlands Institute of International Relations (Clingendael) and also of Radio Netherlands. He was a Member of the Board of Advisors of the Global Panel Foundation, a NGO that works behind the scenes in crisis areas around the world.

He was a signatory of Global Zero, a non-profit international initiative for the elimination of all nuclear weapons worldwide.

== Career ==
Van den Broek worked as a lawyer and prosecutor at Blom & Dutilh in Rotterdam from August 1965 until May 1968 and as a corporate director at the synthetic fiber company ENKA in Arnhem from May 1968 until 12 October 1976. Van den Broek served on the Municipal Council of Rheden from 1 September 1970 until 21 August 1974. Van den Broek became a Member of the House of Representatives after the resignation of Theo van Schaik, taking office on 12 October 1976. After the election of 1981 Van den Broek was appointed State Secretary for Foreign Affairs in the Cabinet Van Agt II, taking office on 11 September 1981. The Cabinet Van Agt II fell just seven months into its term on 12 May 1982 and continued to serve in a demissionary capacity until it was replaced by the caretaker Cabinet Van Agt III with Van den Broek continuing as State Secretary for Foreign Affairs, taking office on 29 May 1982. After the election of 1982 Van den Broek returned as a Member of the House of Representatives, taking office on 16 September 1982. Following the cabinet formation of 1982 Van den Broek was appointed Minister of Foreign Affairs in the Cabinet Lubbers I, taking office on 4 November 1982. After election of 1986 Van den Broek again returned as a Member of the House of Representatives, taking office on 3 June 1986. Following cabinet formation of 1986 Van den Broek continued as Minister of Foreign Affairs in the Cabinet Lubbers II, taking office on 14 July 1986. The Cabinet Lubbers II fell on 3 May 1989 and continued to serve in a demissionary capacity. After the election of 1989 Van den Broek once again returned as a Member of the House of Representatives, taking office on 14 September 1989. Following the cabinet formation of 1989 Van den Broek remained as Minister of Foreign Affairs in the Cabinet Lubbers III, taking office on 7 November 1989.

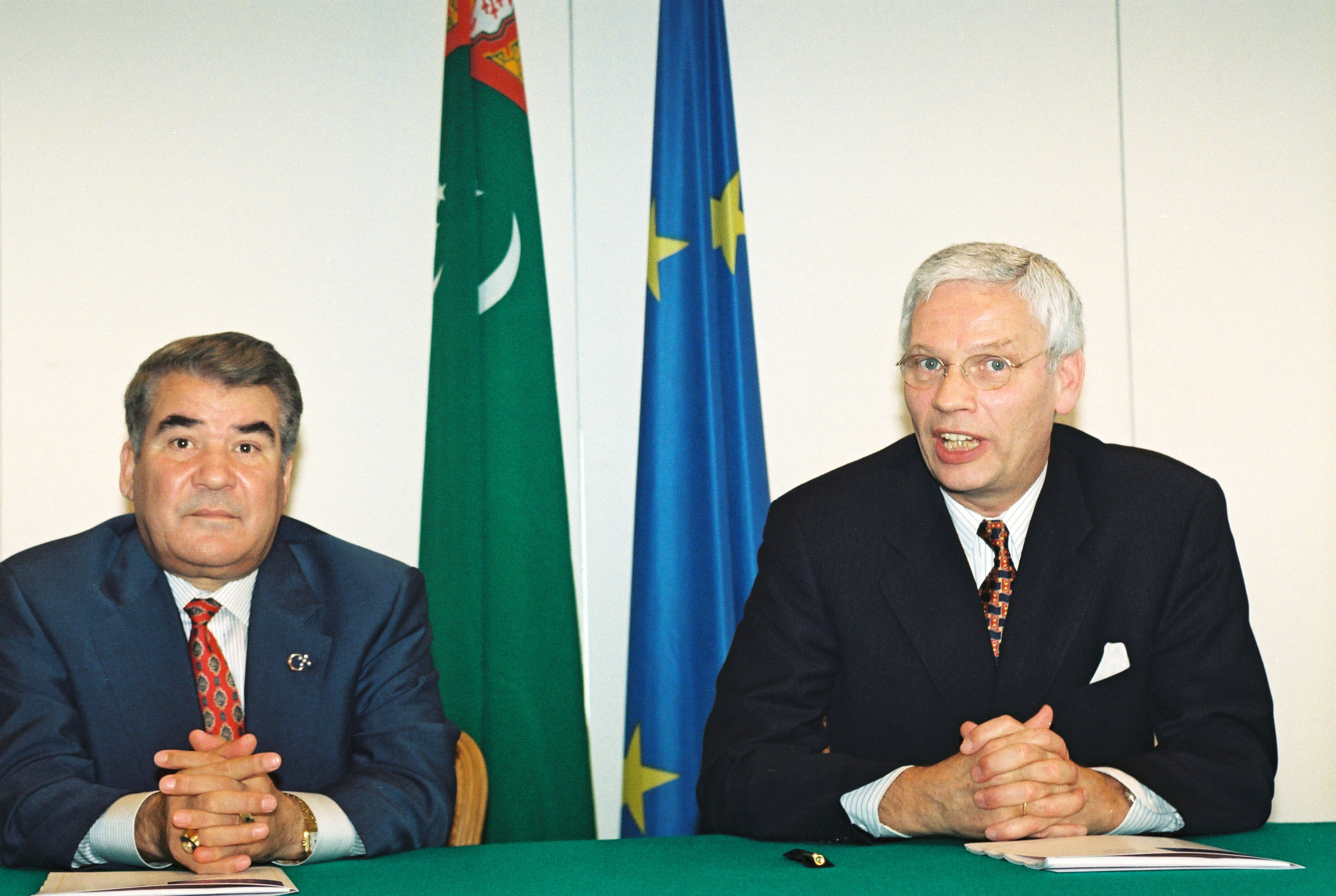
Van den Broek with Turkmenistan's President Saparmurat Niyazov in Brussels, 24 February 1998

In November 1992 Van den Broek was nominated as the next European Commissioner from the Netherlands. Van den Broek was giving the heavy portfolios of External Relations and Enlargement in the Third Delors Commission, he resigned as a Minister of Foreign Affairs on 3 January 1993 and was installed as European Commissioner, taking office on 6 January 1993. In December 1994 Van den Broek was re-nominated as European Commissioner. He kept the portfolios of External Relations and Enlargement and got the additional portfolio of Neighbourhood Policy in the Santer Commission, serving from 23 January 1995 until 16 September 1999.

Van den Broek retired after spending 23 years in national politics and became active in the private sector and public sector and occupied numerous seats as a corporate director and nonprofit director on several boards of directors and supervisory boards (Institute of International Relations Clingendael, Carnegie Foundation, Radio Netherlands Worldwide and the Schiphol Group) and served as a diplomat and lobbyist for several economic delegations on behalf of the government and as an advocate and activist for Human rights, European integration and Nuclear disarmament. He was a Senior Network Member at the European Leadership Network (ELN).

Van den Broek was known for his abilities as a negotiator and debater. Van den Broek continued to comment on political affairs as a statesman until his retirement in 2010 and holds the distinction as the second longest-serving Minister of Foreign Affairs with 10 years, 60 days after World War II. His youngest daughter Princess Marilène is married to Prince Maurits, the oldest son of Princess Margriet the younger sister of former Queen Beatrix.

== Personal life and death ==
Van den Broek was married to Josee van den Broek-van Schendel. They had two daughters, one of whom is Princess Marilène, the wife of Prince Maurits of Orange-Nassau, van Vollenhoven and as such a member of the Dutch royal family.

Van den Broek died on 22 February 2025, at the age of 88.

== Decorations ==
=== Appointments ===
- Netherlands: Minister of State with style of Excellency (25 February 2005)

=== National honours ===
- Knight Grand Cross of the Order of Orange-Nassau (30 April 1993)
- Commander of the Order of the Netherlands Lion (25 February 2005)
- Gold Cross of the Order for Loyalty and Merit (1990)

=== Foreign honours ===
- Austria: Grand Decoration of Honour in Silver of the Decoration of Honour for Services to the Republic of Austria (1989)
- Belgium: Grand Officer of the Order of Leopold II (15 September 1986)
- France:
  - Grand Cross of the National Order of Merit (1999)
  - Grand Officer of the Legion of Honour (6 February 1984)
- Germany: Grand Cross of the Order of Merit of the Federal Republic of Germany (12 October 1984)
- Holy See: Knight of the Order of the Holy Sepulchre (1981)
- Luxembourg: Grand Officer of the Order of the Oak Crown (30 May 1985)
- Poland: Commander of the Order of Merit of the Republic of Poland (10 August 2014)
- Portugal:
  - Grand Cross of the Order of Prince Henry (14 May 1991)
  - Grand Cross of the Order of Merit (2 October 1989)
- Spain: Knight Grand Cross of the Order of Isabella the Catholic (17 September 1987)

== Honorary degrees ==
- Netherlands: Utrecht University – Law (1998)

== Notes ==
Political offices
Preceded by Durk van der Mei	State Secretary for Foreign Affairs; 1981–1982	Succeeded by Wim van Eekelen
Preceded by Dries van Agt	Minister of Foreign Affairs; 1982–1993	Succeeded by Pieter Kooijmans
Preceded by Frans Andriessen	European Commissioner from the Netherlands; 1993–1999	Succeeded by Frits Bolkestein
Non-profit organization positions
Preceded by Ruud Lubbers	Chairman of the Institute of International; Relations Clingendael; 2000–2007	Succeeded by Ben Bot
Preceded by Ruud Lubbers	Chairman of the Supervisory board of the Netherlands Carnegie Foundation; 2000–2007	Succeeded by Ben Bot
Media offices
Preceded by Ruud Lubbers	Chairman of the Supervisory board of Radio Netherlands Worldwide; 2000–2008	Succeeded by Ben Bot
Academic offices
Unknown	Vice President of the Utrecht University; 1997–2007	Unknown
