= Princess Marilène of Orange-Nassau, van Vollenhoven =

Dutch royal (born 1970)

Princess Marilène
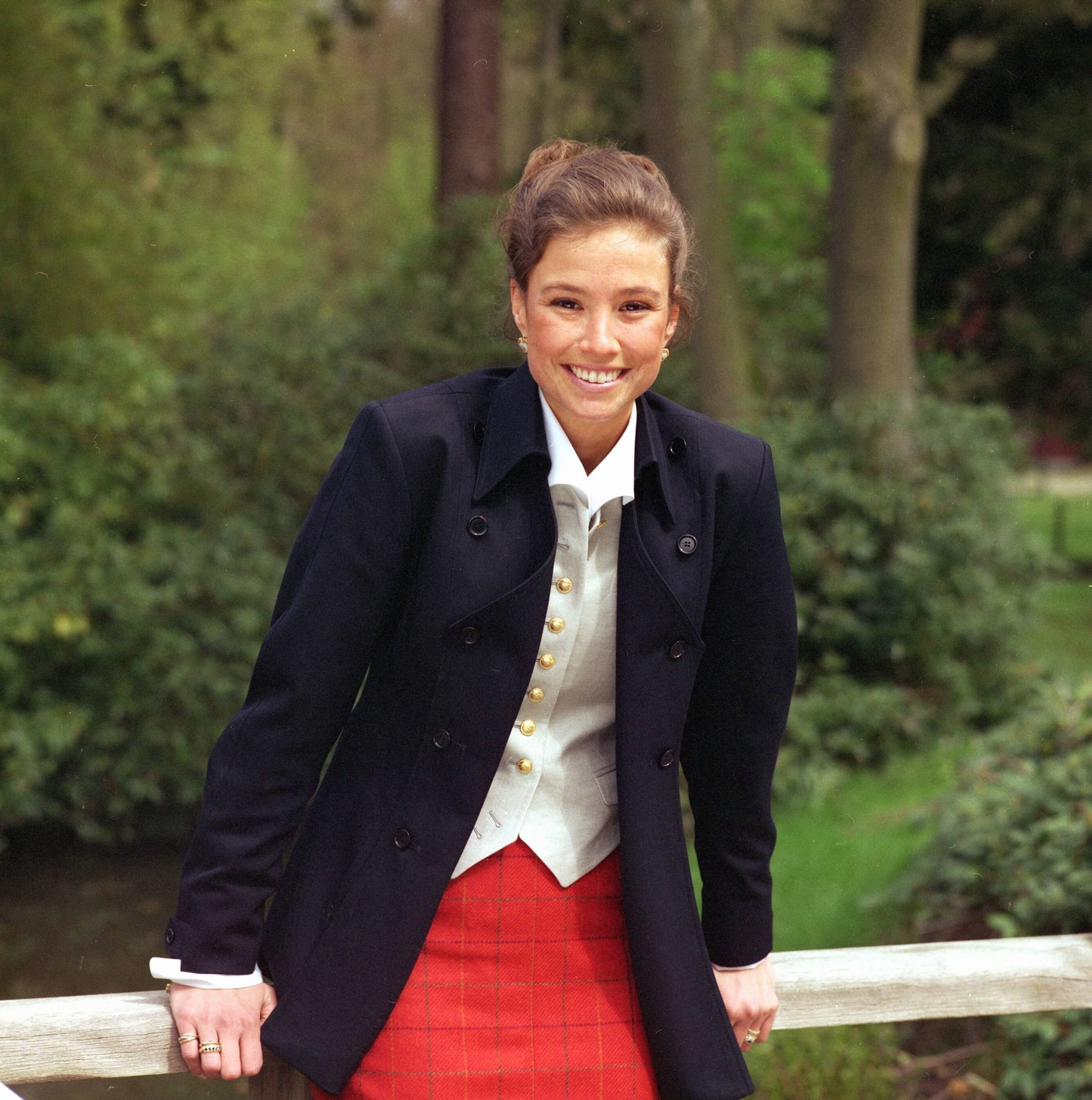
- Princess Marilène in 1998
- Born: Marie-Hélène Angela van den Broek; 4 February 1970 (age 56); Dieren, Rheden, Netherlands
- Spouse: Prince Maurits of Orange-Nassau, van Vollenhoven (m. 1998)
- Issue: Anastasia van Lippe-Biesterfeld van Vollenhoven; Lucas van Lippe-Biesterfeld van Vollenhoven; Felicia van Lippe-Biesterfeld van Vollenhoven
Names
- Marie-Hélène Angela "Marilène"
- Father: Hans van den Broek
- Mother: Josee van den Broek-van Schendel

Princess Marilène of Orange-Nassau, van Vollenhoven-van den Broek (née Marie-Hélène Angela van den Broek; 4 February 1970) is the wife of Prince Maurits of Orange-Nassau, van Vollenhoven, and was thereby member of the Dutch Royal House until King Willem-Alexander's accession in 2013 rendered Prince Maurits too distantly related to the reigning monarch. She remains a member of the larger Dutch royal family.

== Early life ==
Princess Marilène was born in Dieren, Rheden, and is the youngest daughter of Hans van den Broek and Josee van den Broek-van Schendel. The van den Broeks belong to the Dutch patriciate. Marilène van den Broek obtained her highschool diploma (pre-university secondary education) in Wassenaar in 1988. She studied from 1988 to 1994 at the University of Groningen where she received her MSc degree in Business Administration. Princess Marilène currently works at the Rijksmuseum Amsterdam, a Dutch national museum dedicated to arts, crafts, and history.

== Marriage and children ==
She married Prince Maurits of Orange-Nassau, van Vollenhoven in Apeldoorn civilly on 29 May 1998, followed by a religious ceremony on 30 May. His Highness Prince Maurits is the eldest son of Princess Margriet of the Netherlands and Pieter van Vollenhoven. Princess Marilène and Prince Maurits have three children, who carry no title, but by Royal Decree of 26 May 1998 bear the surname "van Lippe-Biesterfield van Vollenhoven":

- Anastasia (Anna) Margriet Joséphine van Lippe-Biesterfeld van Vollenhoven, born in Amsterdam on 15 April 2001.
- Lucas Maurits Pieter Henri van Lippe-Biesterfeld van Vollenhoven, born in Amsterdam on 26 October 2002.
- Felicia Juliana Bénedicte Barbara van Lippe-Biesterfeld van Vollenhoven, born in Amsterdam on 31 May 2005.
