= Baflo =

- Village
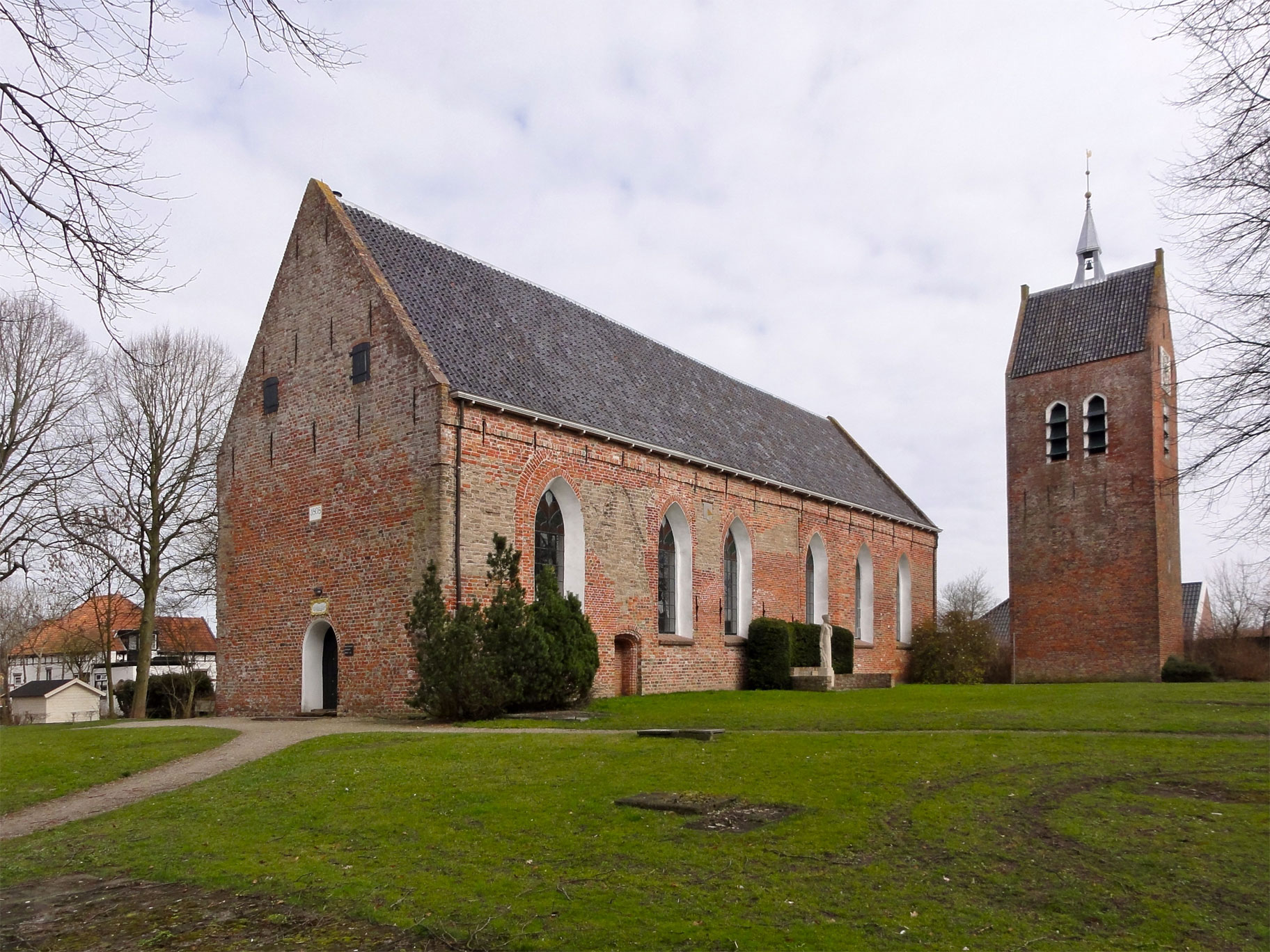
- Sint Laurentius church of Baflo

- Coat of arms

- Location of Baflo in the province of Groningen Baflo (Netherlands)
- Coordinates: 53°21′43″N 6°30′48″E
- Country: Netherlands
- Province: Groningen
- Municipality: Het Hogeland

Area
  - Total: 31.45 km^{2} (12.14 sq mi)
- Elevation: 0.8 m (2.6 ft)

Population (2021)
  - Total: 2,045
  - Density: 65.02/km^{2} (168.4/sq mi)
- Time zone: UTC+1 (CET)
  - Summer (DST): UTC+2 (CEST)
- Postal code: 9953 & 9956
- Dialing code: 0595

Baflo (Dutch pronunciation: [ˈbɑfloː]; Gronings: Bavvelt [ˈbaʋl̩t]) is a village in the municipality of Het Hogeland, Netherlands.

Famous people born in Baflo include humanist Rodolphus Agricola (1443/1444–1485) and jurist Gezina van der Molen (1892–1972).

Until 1990, Baflo was a separate municipality. Baflo has a railway station.

== Church of St. Laurentius ==
Baflo church was originally dedicated to St. Laurentius. It is the large one-aisled church with free standing tower. The church was first mentioned in 1211. The tower of church is separated from the main building.

== Gallery ==
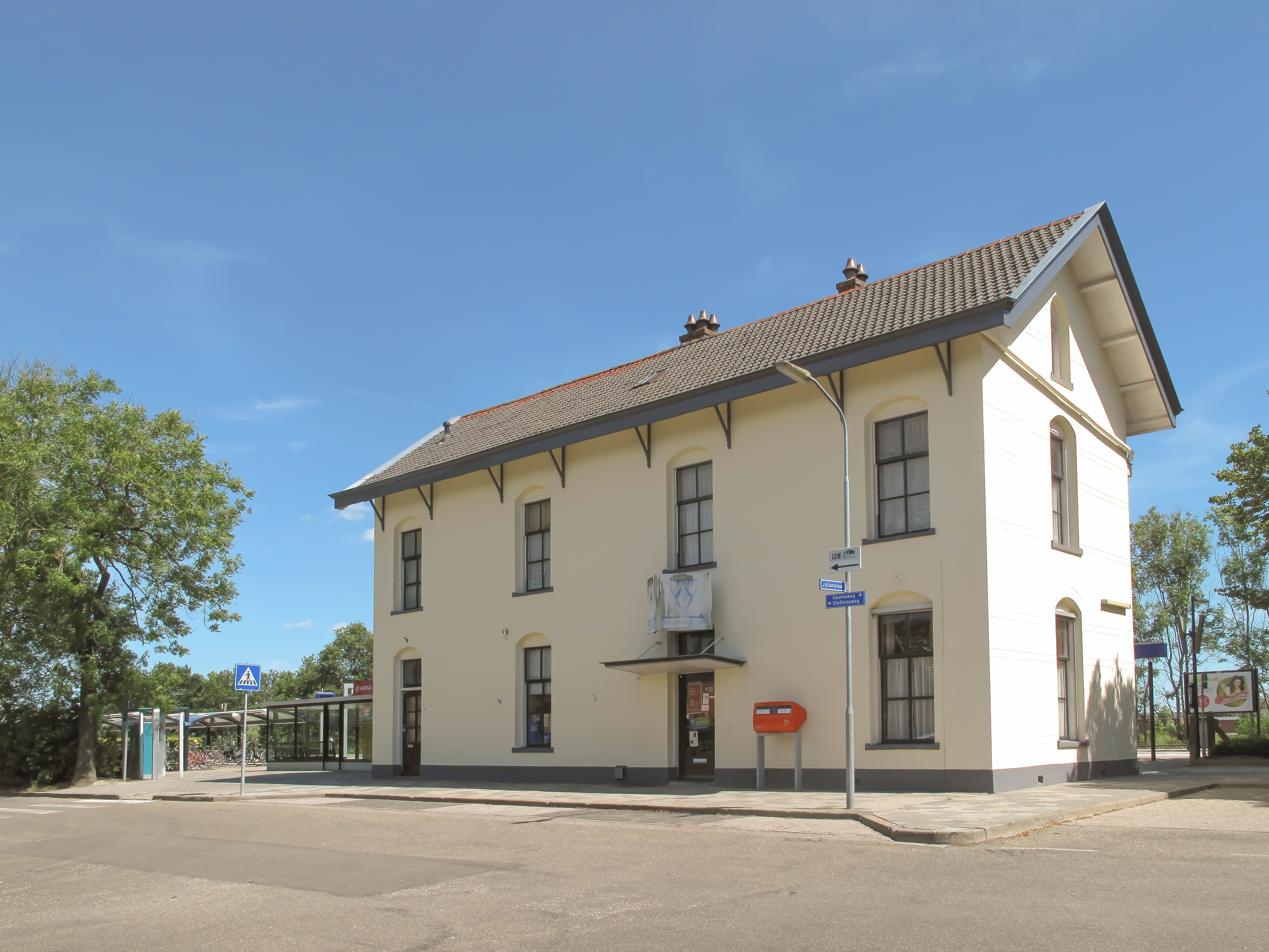
Baflo railway station

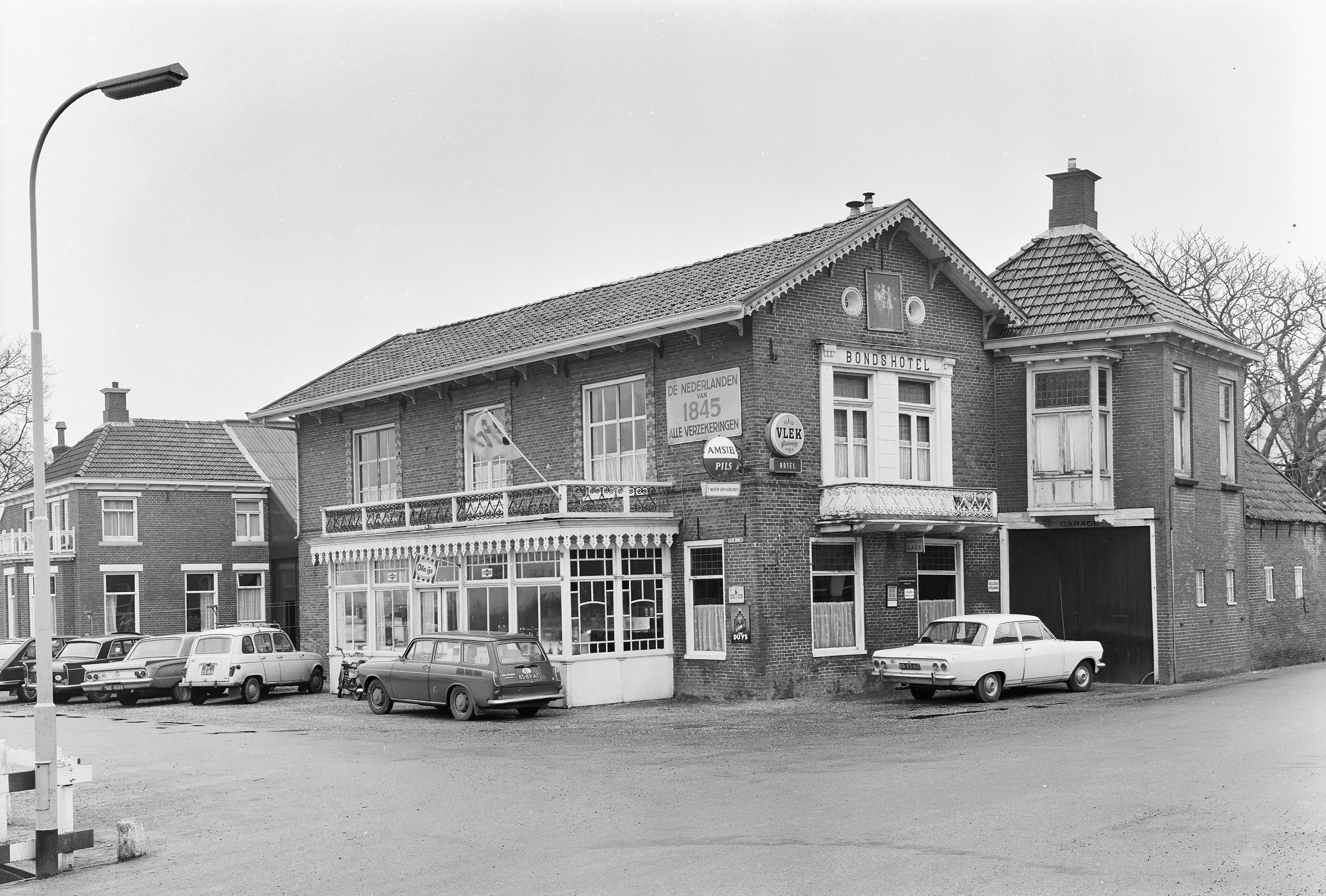
Pub in Baflo

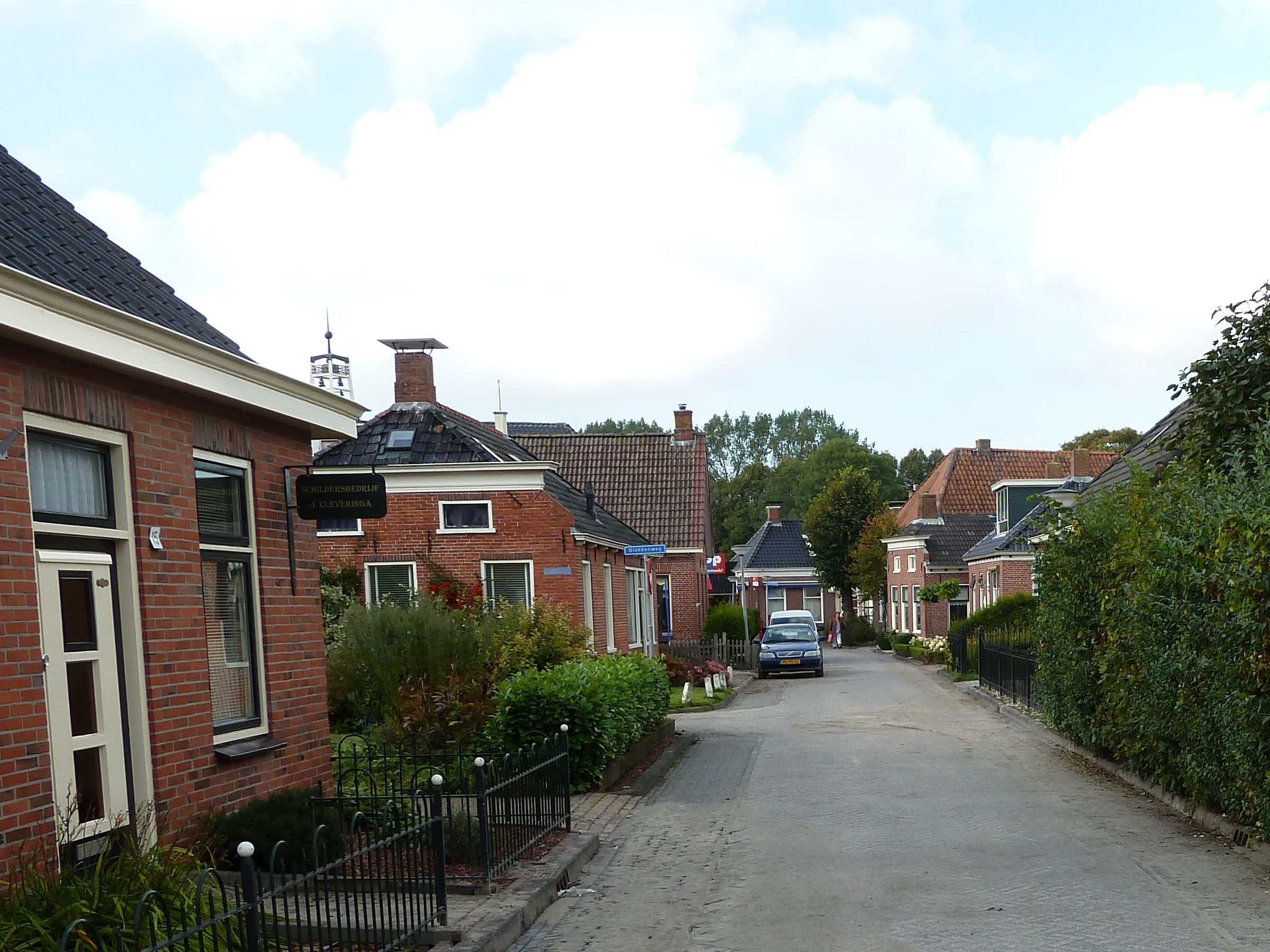
Street in Baflo

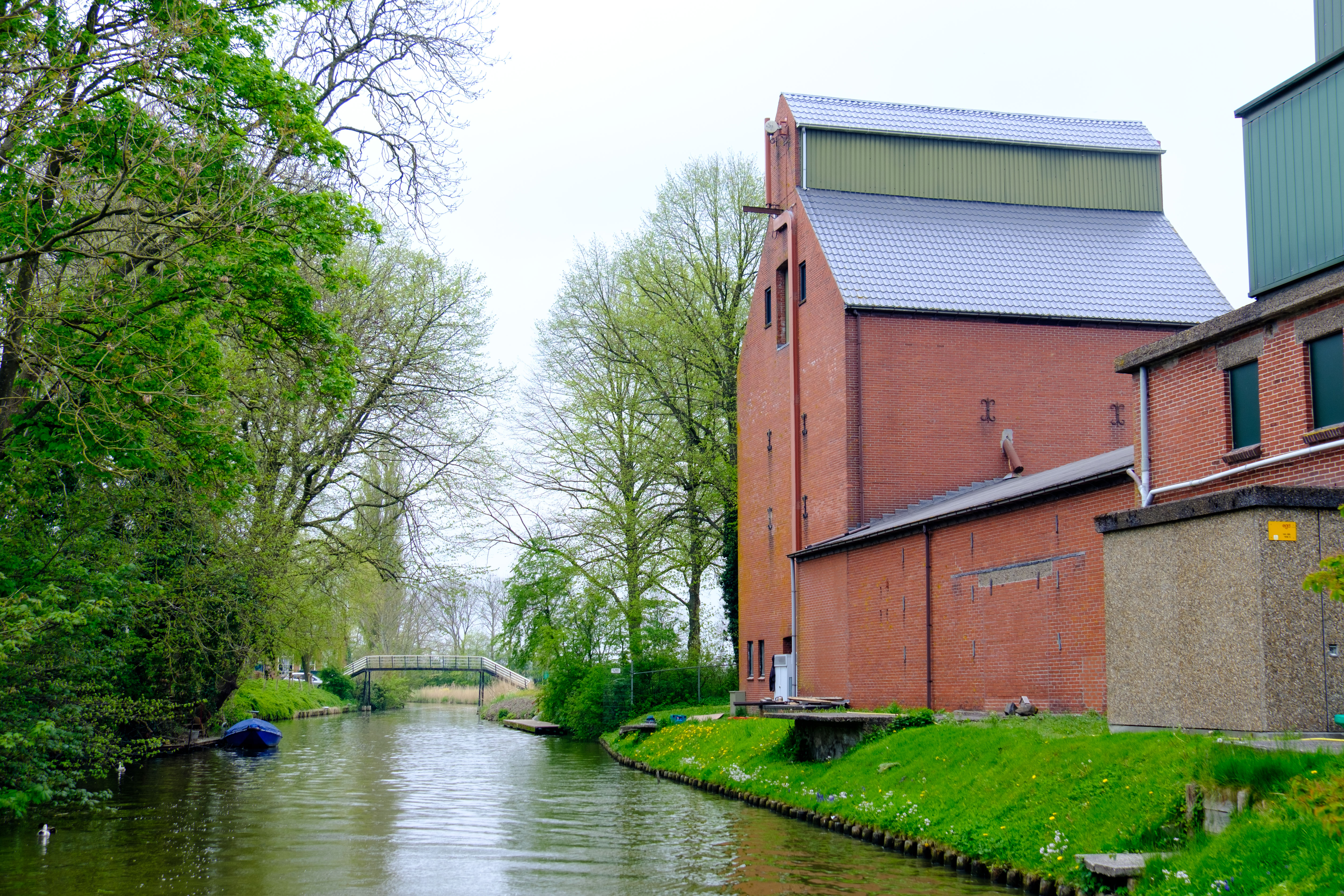
Fodder factory Nienoord
