= Gezina van der Molen =

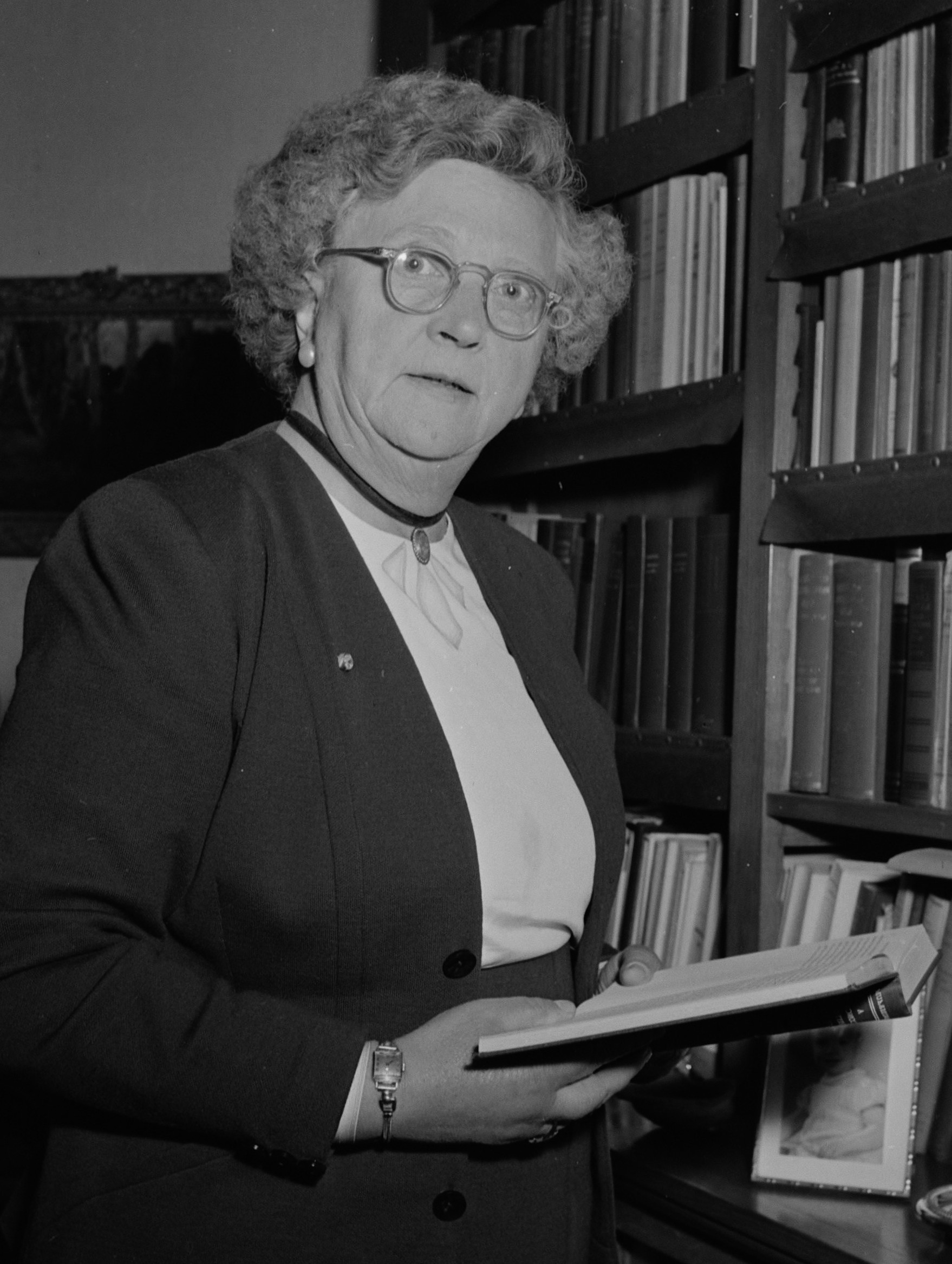
Image of Professor Molen

Gezina Hermina Johanna van der Molen (Baflo, 20 January 1892 - Aerdenhout, 9 October 1978) was a Dutch legal scholar and resistance fighter during the Second World War. From 1924 to 1929, she studied law at the Free University of Amsterdam — the first female student to do so — and was also the first woman to obtain a doctoral degree from there. She dealt with numerous issues: the rights of women, apartheid in South Africa, the United Nations, the South Moluccas and New Guinea.

== Work ==
- Alberto Gentili and the Development of International Law. His Life Work and Times. Leyden, A.W.Sijthoff, 1968, 2nd, revised edition.
