= 2009 attack on the Dutch royal family =

Vehicle ramming in Apeldoorn, Netherlands

Attack on Dutch royal family
- Location in Apeldoorn of the incident on Queen's Day 2009
- Location: 52°13′40″N 5°56′46″E; Apeldoorn, Netherlands
- Date: 30 April 2009 (Dutch National holiday); 11:50 (UTC+2)
- Target: Dutch royal family
- Attack type: Vehicle ramming attack, attempted regicide, mass murder
- Weapon: Suzuki Swift
- Deaths: 8 (including the attacker)
- Injuries: 10
- Perpetrator: Karst Roeland Tates
- Motive: Unknown

On 30 April 2009 in Apeldoorn, The Netherlands, a man drove his car at high speed into a parade which included Queen Beatrix, Crown Prince Willem-Alexander and other members of the Dutch royal family. The attack took place on the Dutch national holiday of Koninginnedag (or Queen's Day).

The driver deliberately drove through people lining the street watching the parade, resulting in eight deaths, including the attacker, and ten injuries. The car missed the royal family and crashed into a monument at the side of the road. No members of the royal family were harmed. It was the first attack on the Dutch royal family in modern times. (Note: Two other attempts had been planned in "modern times" – an abduction attempt by soldiers of the German 22nd Airlanding Division in May 1940 was aborted when their planes crashed on landing and there was an attempt to kidnap Queen Juliana by Moluccans in 1975.)

The driver, identified as 38-year-old Dutch national Karst Roeland Tates, was treated by members of the fire brigade and police, taken into custody and transported to a hospital. He died the next day, becoming the seventh person killed by injuries suffered during the attack. A 46-year-old woman died from her injuries on 8 May, bringing the total number of deaths to eight.

== Location of the attack ==
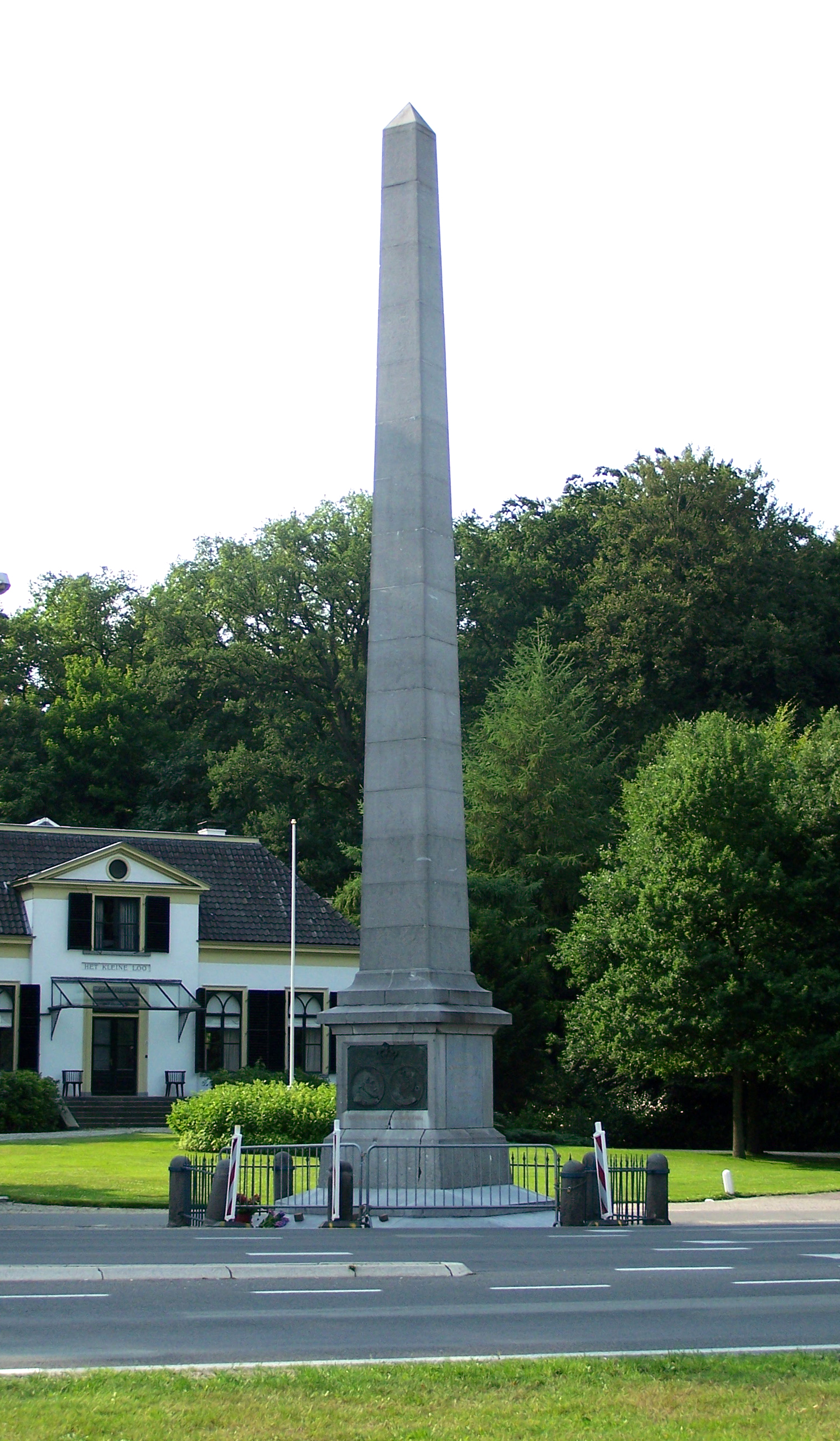
De Naald

Layout of the incident. Red is the path of the car, orange the path of the coach carrying the royal family. The car crashed through the crowd at the marker and came to rest against monument De Naald

Around 11:50 am, just before an open-top bus carrying the Dutch royal family made its last turn towards the palace of Het Loo in Apeldoorn, a black older-model Suzuki Swift crashed through the onlookers, just missing the bus carrying the royal family members, and slammed into De Naald, an obelisk-shaped royal monument. Seconds after the attack, Red Cross and police first responders were providing basic life-saving treatment to the 17 victims, who were all taken to nearby hospitals. After the crash, the vehicle was examined by the anti-terrorism department and local police.

The attack and search were shown on live TV. Members of the Dutch royal family who were waving at the crowds gathered were shown standing up to look over at the crashed car, visibly shocked and gasping with their hands over their mouths.

== Attacker ==
The mortally injured Karst Tates still sitting in his car after the attack, with the royal bus in the background

Karst Roeland Tates (6 March 1971 in Zevenaar – 1 May 2009 in Deventer), a 38-year-old Dutchman, was identified as the driver of the car. After the attack, he was treated by the fire department and transferred to a hospital for further care. Tates was from Huissen, a small town in the eastern Netherlands, and had no criminal record. Police said he confessed in his car, while bleeding, saying that he intended to hit the royal family.

Tates died in the early morning of 1 May of brain injuries from the crash. An autopsy was performed; no traces of alcohol were found in his blood.

Tates knew the city of Apeldoorn well because he lived in the city of Apeldoorn in the 1990s and completed his hotel school training here. Around 2005, Tates moved to Velp, Gelderland, where he rented an apartment to 2007. Tates lived in Huissen from 2007 to 2009.

Tates' motive remains unclear. He had called his mother to congratulate her on her birthday on the day before the attack and said he was looking forward to her birthday party on 3 May. He left no indication he was planning anything. Tates' parents describe him as kind and attentive, and although there had been periods of financial trouble in his past, he had recently found work. According to his parents, Tates held no ill will towards the royal family and had described the Queen as a "stabilising force".

The friends and acquaintances of Tates described him as kind, and they never expected him to do this act.

However, other reports revealed that Tates "had embarked on a mission of vengeance against society after losing his job as a night-shift security guard" earlier in the year and had been facing eviction from his house. He told a neighbour he was depressed and had been out of contact with family for months.

The official investigation established that the attack was premeditated but not well prepared. The report said the people killed were innocent bystanders who were watching the parade. Tates had scouted the area beforehand but when he returned for his assault, the situation had changed and people were standing in a previously cordoned-off street but he made no attempt to avoid them.

The public prosecutor assumed Tates acted alone and concluded that his actions would never be totally explained.

== Aftermath ==
A few hours after the attack, Queen Beatrix addressed the nation in an emotional video message.

What started out as a beautiful day has ended in a terrible tragedy that has shocked all of us. People who were standing nearby, who saw it happen on television, all those who witnessed it, must have been watching in astonishment and disbelief. We [the royal family] are speechless that something so terrible could have happened. My family, myself, and, I think, every person in the country feels for the victims, their families and friends, and all who have been affected by this incident.

— Queen Beatrix

At a press conference that afternoon, police reported that Tates, who was still conscious but severely injured after the accident, had told police that it was a deliberate act aimed at the royal family. He had no prior history of psychological problems, and there are no indications that any sort of terrorist group was involved. Initial rumours that the car was rigged with explosives were later denied by the police.

=== Cancelled events ===
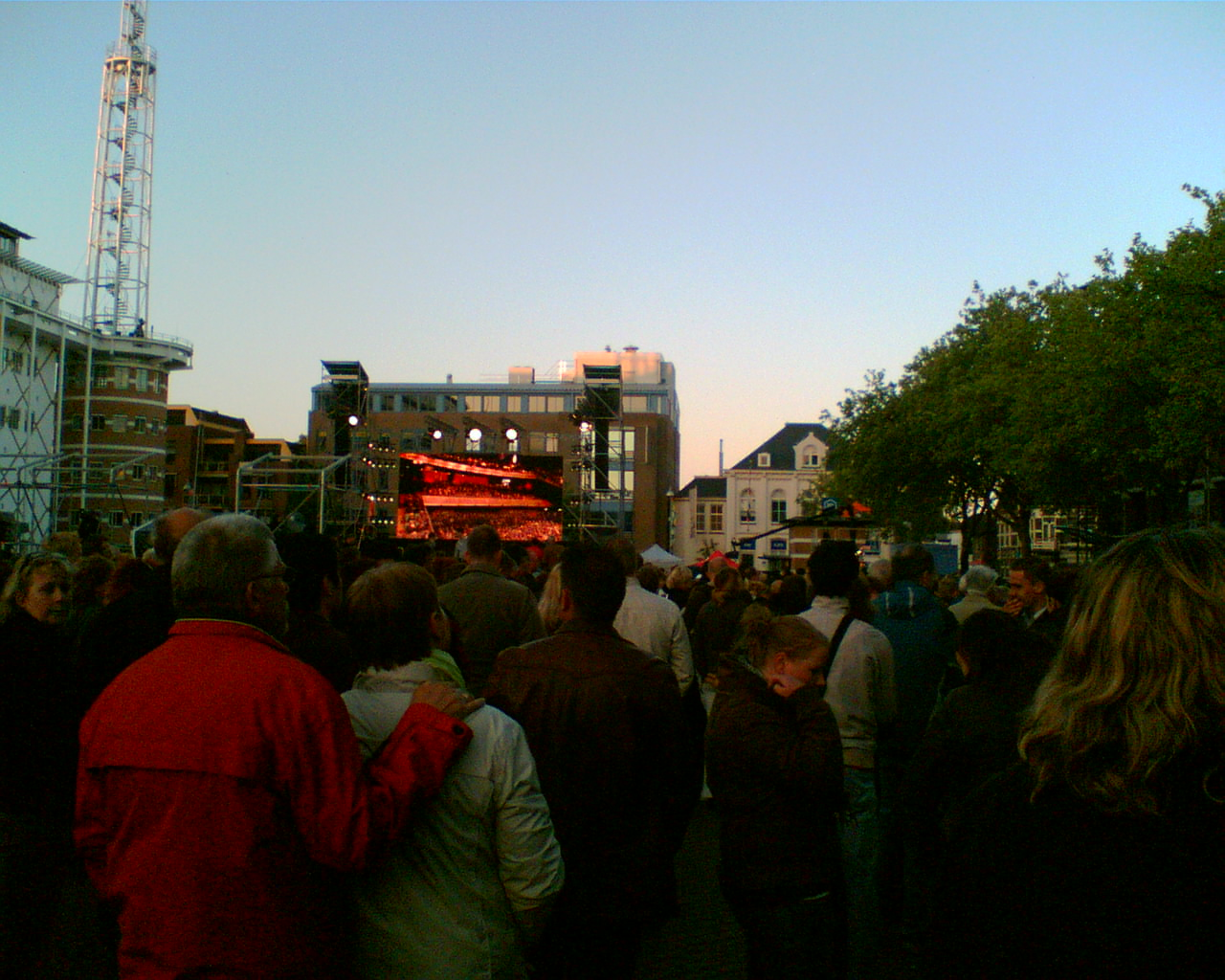
Public gathering on the central market square during memorial service of 8 May 2009

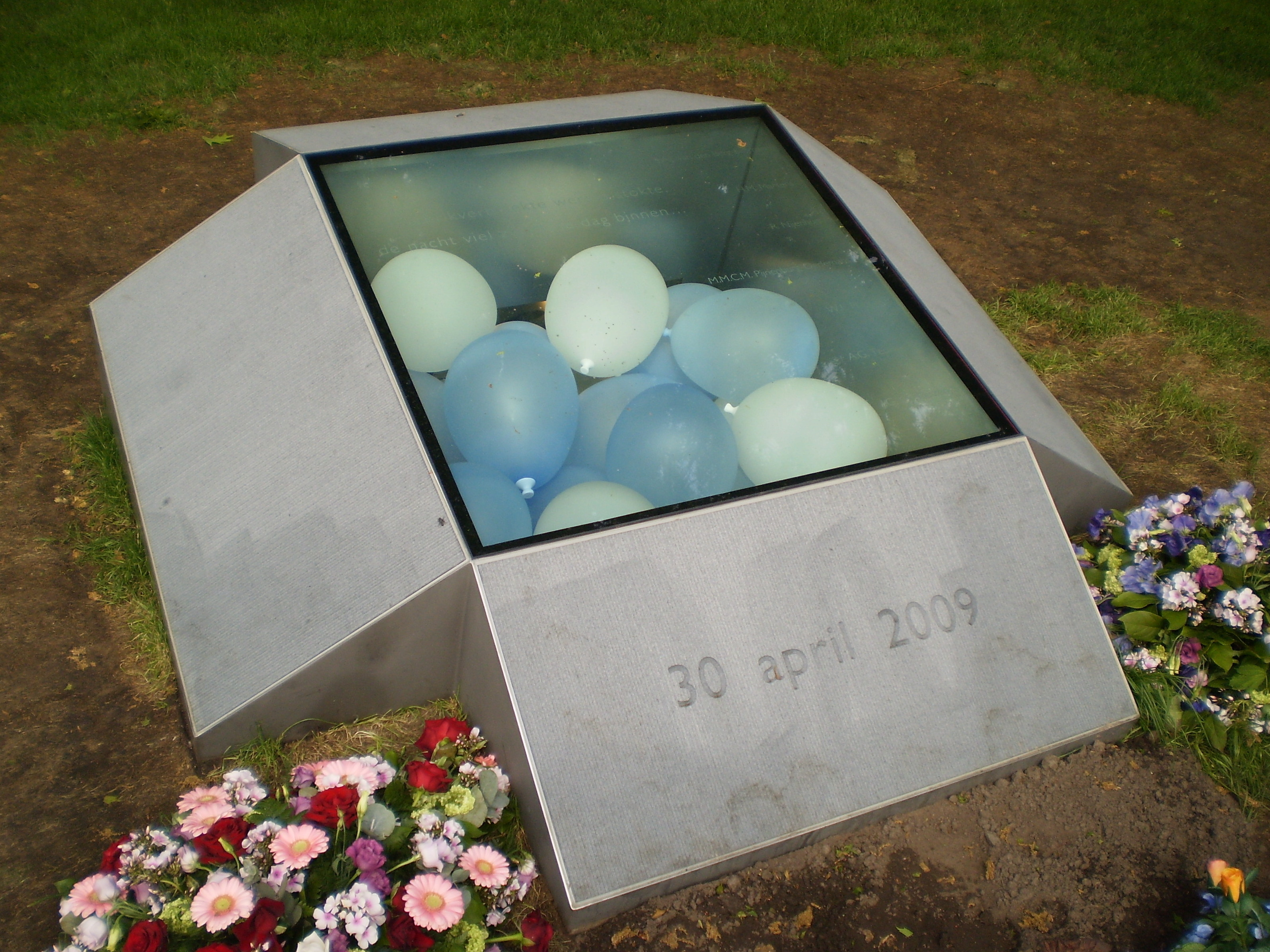
Monument remembering the seven victims, by glass artist Menno Jonker; unveiled 29 April 2010

Following the attack, at 12:15 pm local time, it was announced that all planned celebrations in Apeldoorn were cancelled. Later that day, many other events across the Netherlands were also cancelled, shortened or toned down significantly – including all activities in Rotterdam and many events in Amsterdam.

As the news of the attack spread, many people spontaneously lowered the national flag to half-mast (the normal flag instruction on Queen's Day is to fly the flag, with orange banner, normally, and many people follow this instruction). Prime Minister Jan Peter Balkenende announced the order to lower all flags on government buildings to half-mast.

Initially, it was feared that the "act of madness by a lone attacker" endangered the long-held yearly tradition of the royal family's mingling with the Dutch people on Queen's Day.

=== Memorial service ===
On 8 May, a memorial service was held in the Orpheus theatre in Apeldoorn, with speeches by Prime Minister Jan Peter Balkenende and mayor of Apeldoorn Fred de Graaf. It was attended by the Queen, the Prince of Orange, Princess Máxima, Princess Margriet and Pieter van Vollenhoven as well as 1,200 guests. Some 5,000 people watched the ceremony on screens placed outside on Apeldoorn's central market square and millions more on live television. Hours after the memorial, it was announced that after being in critical condition for over a week, an eighth person had died of injuries sustained in the attack.

=== Monument ===
On 29 April 2010, Queen Beatrix and Mayor De Graaf unveiled a monument for the seven victims, near the location of the attack. The work by artist Menno Jonker resembles a box containing seven white balloons among several blue balloons, representing vulnerability, festivity and mourning.

=== 2010 bomb panic ===
Just over a year after the attack, on 4 May 2010, during Remembrance of the Dead ceremony on Dam Square in Amsterdam attended by Queen Beatrix, a 39-year-old man dressed as an Orthodox Jew and carrying a suitcase shouted "Bomb!" during a two-minute silence. This was followed by the yell of a woman and a falling security fence, which according to witnesses sounded like a gunshot. It sparked panic in the crowd of 20,000, causing a stampede that injured 87 people. Dozens fell on the ground, and some suffered broken bones as a result. The man, who was nicknamed in the media as the Damschreeuwer (meaning Dam Screamer), or "The Rabbi", was claimed to have been drunk at the time, according to his lawyer.
