= Naald =

De Naald (English "The Needle") may refer to several monuments in the Netherlands:

- De Naald, Apeldoorn
- De Naald, Heemstede
- The Needle of Rijswijk
- The Needle of Waterloo, in Soestdijk
