= Het Oude Loo =

Dutch castle

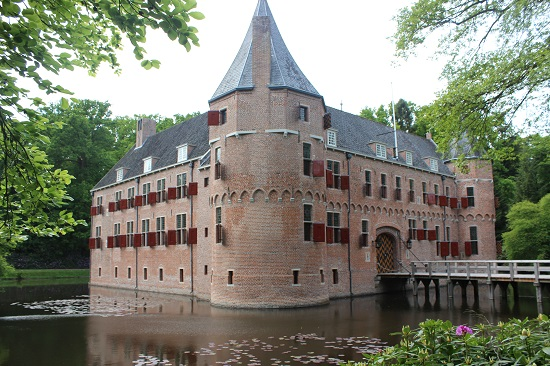
- Het Oude Loo in 2006

- Location within Gelderland

General information
- Type: Castle
- Location: Koninklijk Park 17; Apeldoorn, Netherlands
- Coordinates: 52°14′7″N 5°56′33″E
- Current tenants: Dutch royal family

Het Oude Loo (Dutch pronunciation: [ɦɛt ˈʌudə loː]; The Old Woods) is a 15th-century castle on the estate of Het Loo Palace in Apeldoorn in the Netherlands. The castle was built as a hunting lodge and is surrounded by a moat. The castle is currently used by the Dutch royal family as a country house and guest residence. It is not open to the public.

== History ==
The castle was built in the 15th century. In 1684, the castle and the surrounding land was bought by William III of Orange. On this land, he had Het Loo Palace built. The castle was used by the court as, among other things, an apothecary. In early the 19th century the castle came into the hands of Louis Napoleon who filled up the moat. After the return of the house of Orange-Nassau to the Netherlands in 1813 Het Oude Loo became the property of king William I. A few decades later, during the 1840s and early 1850s, the castle was home to the Royal Loo Hawking Club, which counted King William II's sons William and Alexander and the 7th Duke of Leeds among its members. The Club was disbanded in 1855.

Queen Wilhelmina of the Netherlands had the castle and the moat restored by architect Pierre Cuypers. Since 1968, the castle has been owned by the Dutch state. In 1973, it became a national heritage site. The castle is currently used by the Dutch royal family as a country house and guest residence.

On 21 March 2022, it was announced that the property would be used to house 20-30 refugees fleeing the 2022 Russian invasion of Ukraine.

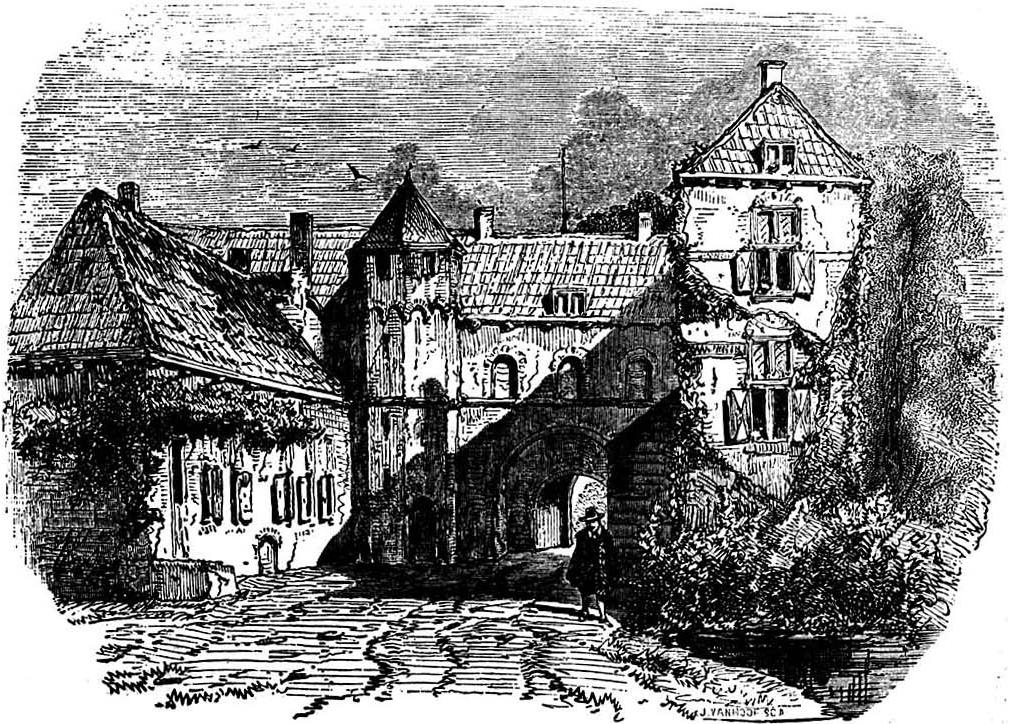
Rear view in 1860

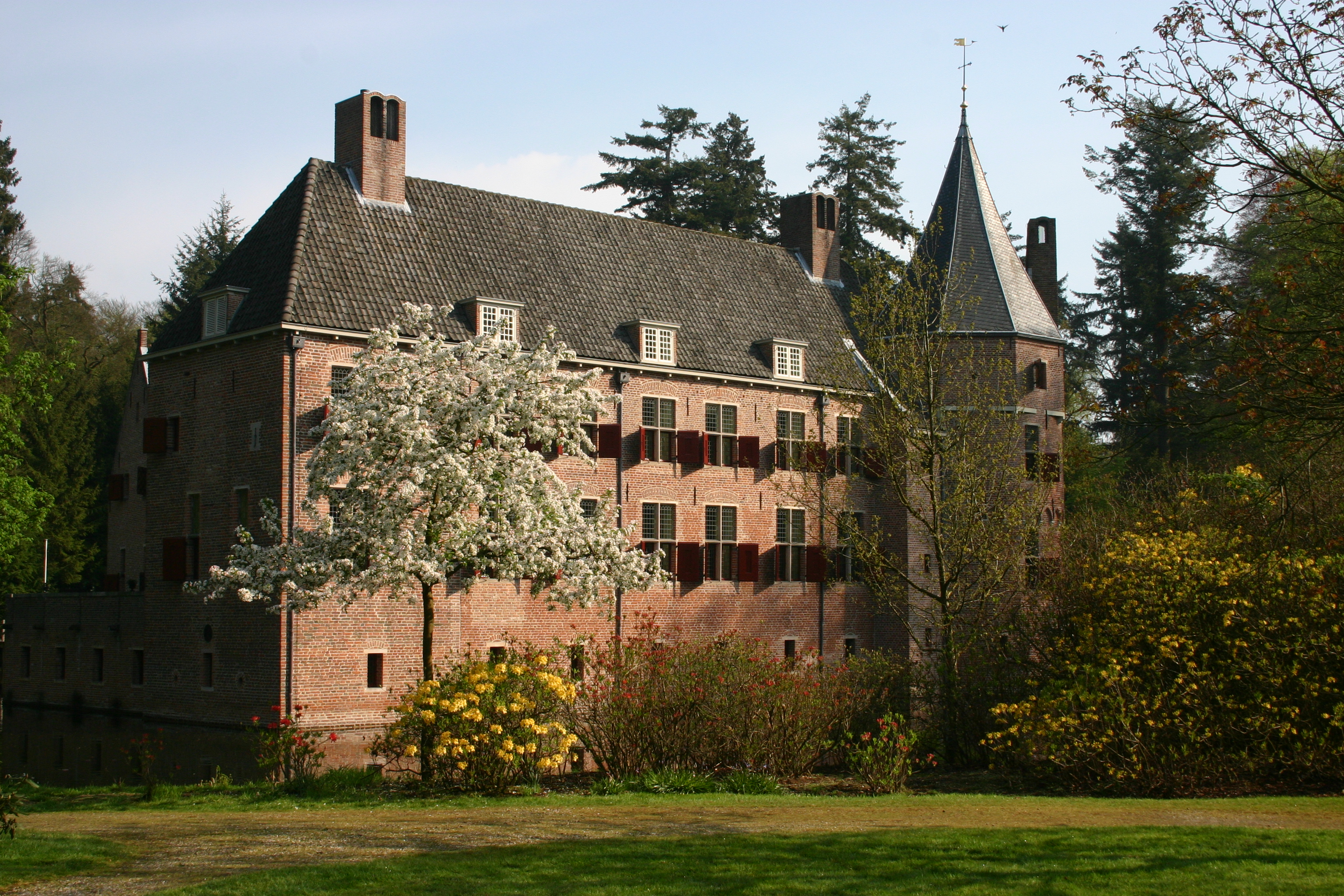
Side view in 2005

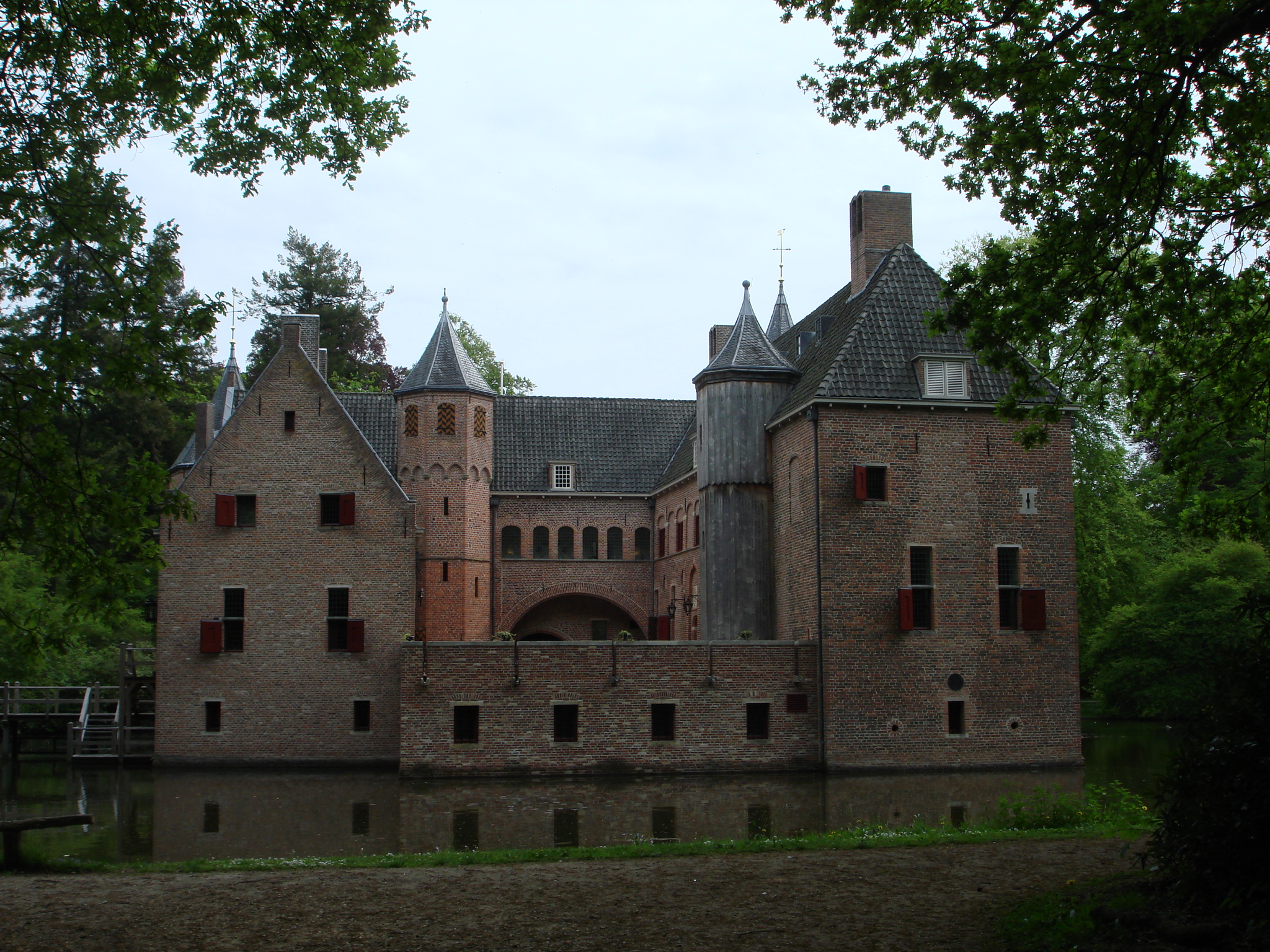
Side view in 2015

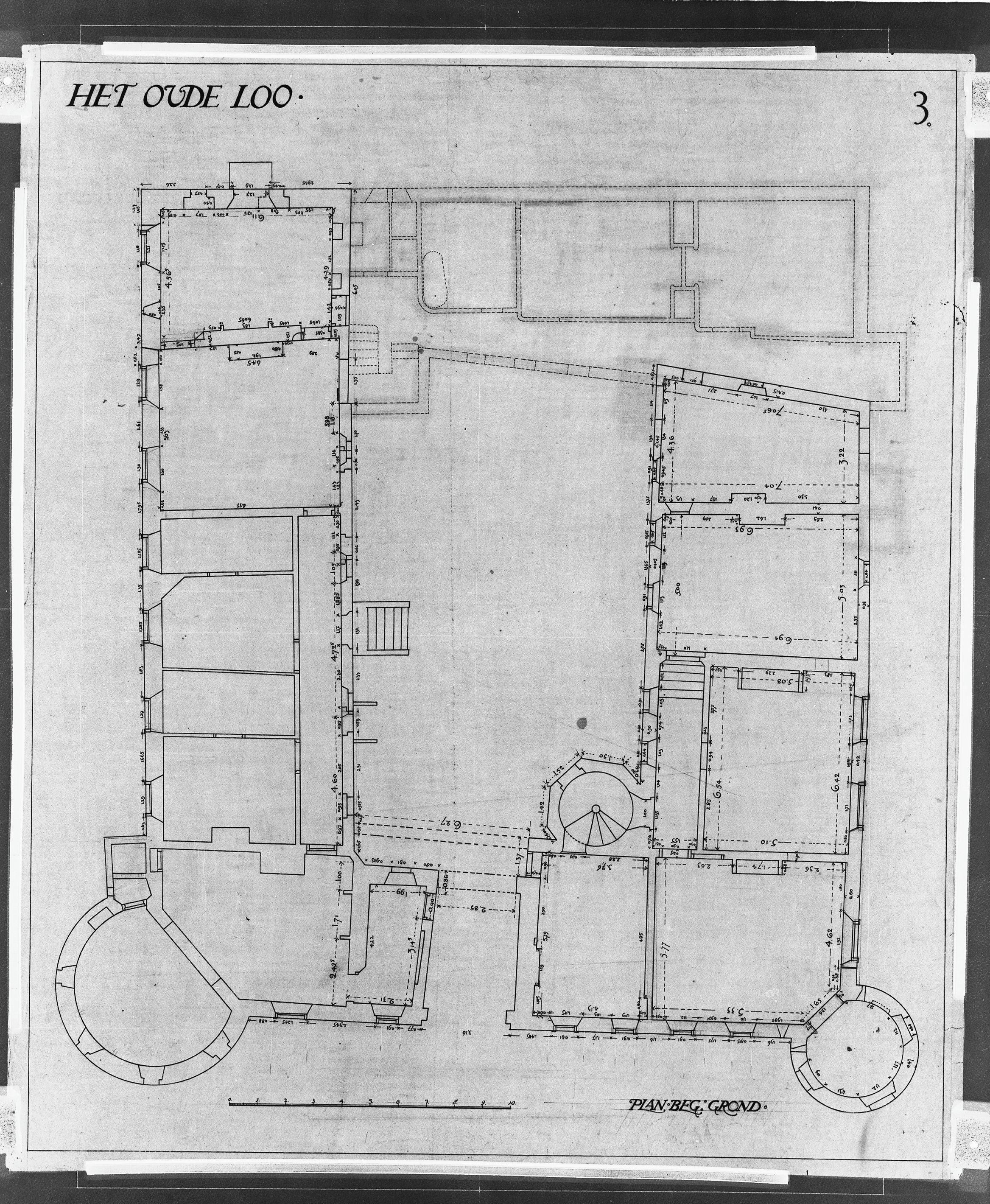
Map of the ground floor

== Gardens ==
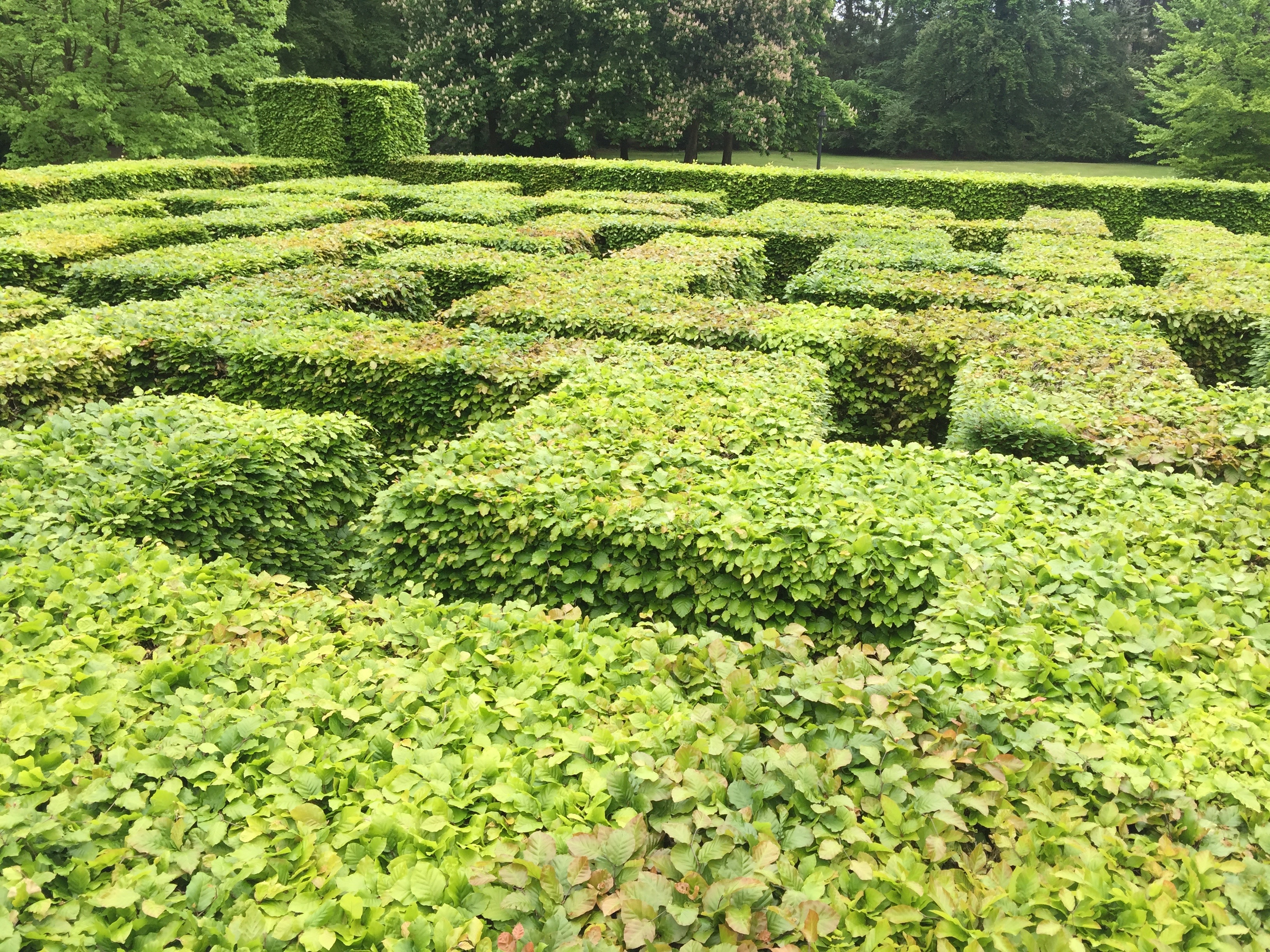
Hedge maze in the gardens of Het Oude Loo, May 2016

The gardens of the castle have a statue pond, a maze made out of beech trees, and an outdoor bowling alley. They can be visited in the months of April and May.

== See also ==
- List of castles in the Netherlands
