= De Naald, Apeldoorn =

Memorial in Gelderland, Netherlands

Coordinates: 52°13′40″N 5°56′46″E

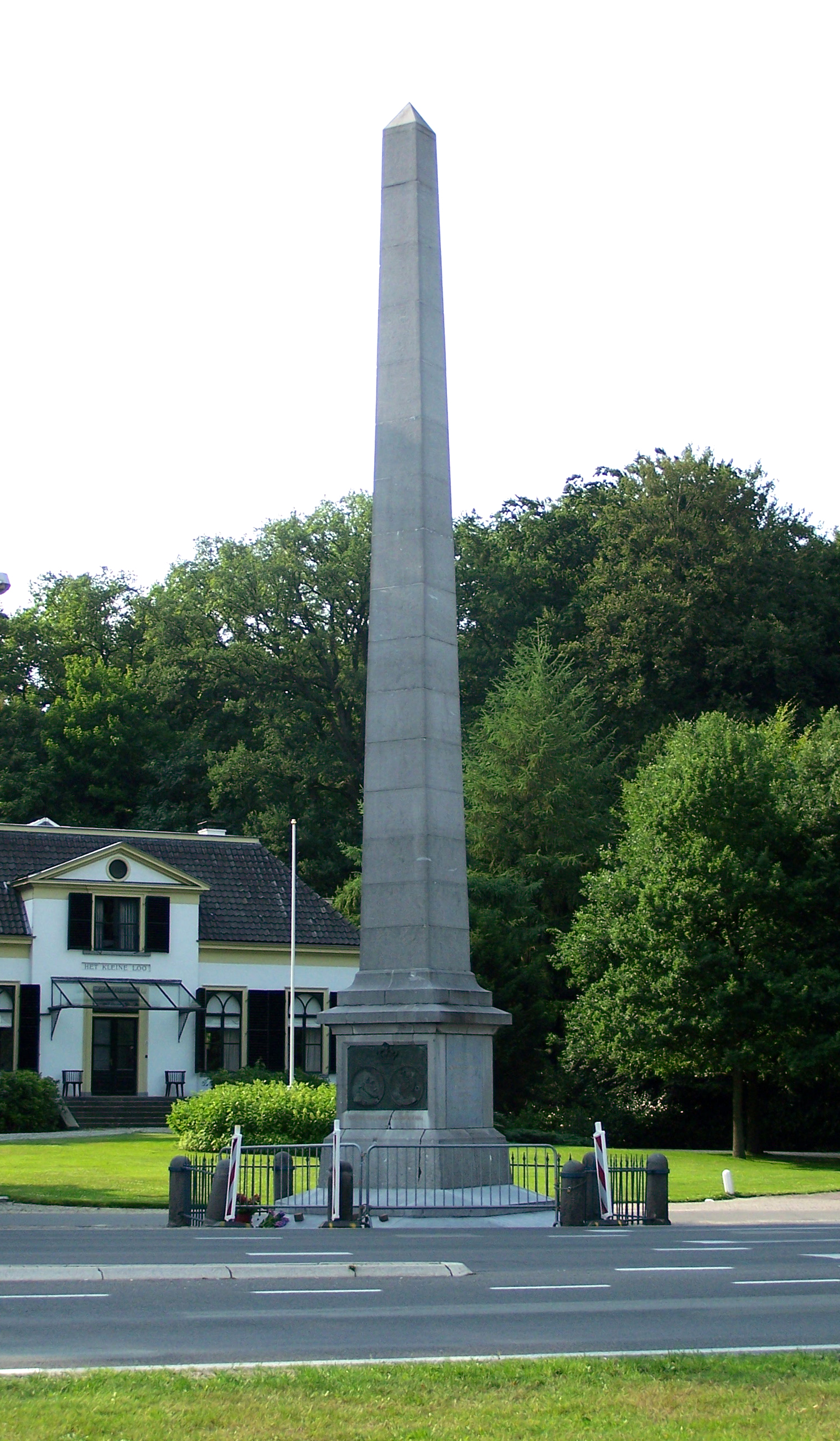
2009 photograph of De Naald

De Naald (English: The Needle) is an obelisk-shaped monument at the side of the Zwolseweg road in the Dutch city of Apeldoorn, near Het Loo Palace. It is built of stone and surrounded by a low iron fence.

== History ==
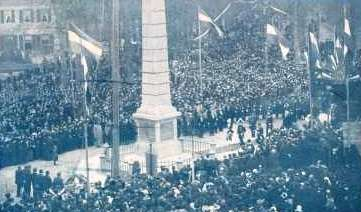
The dedication of De Naald on March 9, 1901

The monument was an idea of the Mayor of Apeldoorn, H.P.J. Tutein Nolthenius. The project was funded through a collection campaign among residents of Apeldoorn, who donated 3,518 Dutch guilders and 37 and a half cents. The monument was intended to be a gift from the people of Apeldoorn to Queen Wilhelmina and her fiancé Prince Hendrik, the Duke of Mecklenburg-Schwerin on the occasion of their marriage. Formally it was dedicated to Queen Wilhelmina's mother Queen Emma the Queen Regent and her late husband King William III.

When Queen Wilhelmina and Prince Hendrik were married on 7 February 1901, the needle was not yet ready. It was dedicated just over a month later on 9 March 1901.

On April 30, 2009, a driver who attempted to attack the Dutch royal family, leaving eight dead and injuring nine, drove into the monument at high speed. The fence and some of the low stone bollards around the monument were heavily damaged.

== Structural details ==
Location of De Naald in Apeldoorn

De Naald is a 17-meter-high (56-foot) obelisk-shaped stone monument, surrounded by a low iron fence. The portrait of William III and Emma in profile are shown on two plates. There is a plaque attached to the monument, with the following text:

Founded by the Residents of the Municipality of Apeldoorn as a grateful tribute to the serene parents of Her Majesty Queen Wilhelmina. (English translation from the Dutch original)
