= Het Loo Palace =

Palace in Apeldoorn, Netherlands, built by the House of Orange-Nassau

- Paleis Het Loo
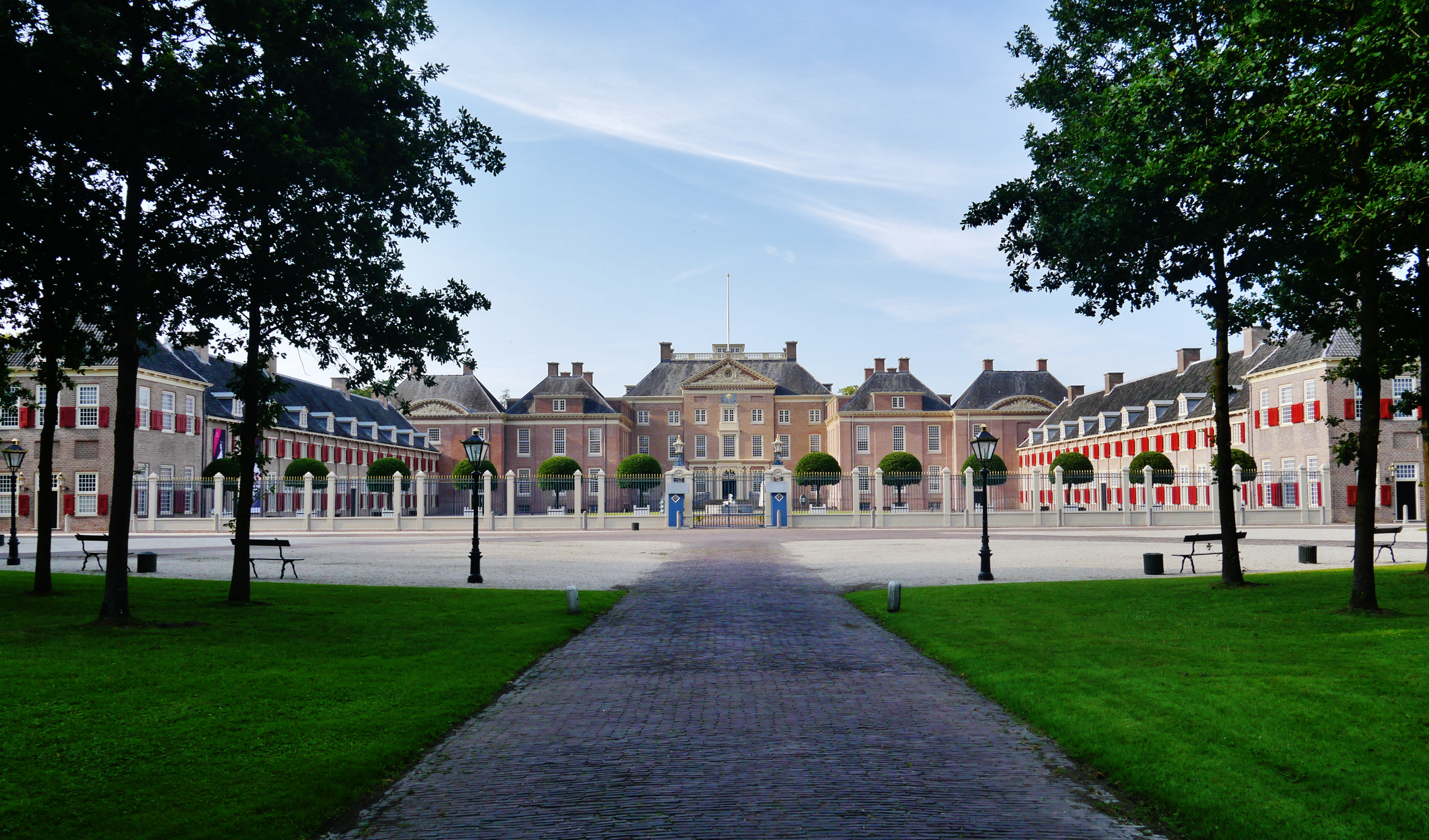
- The cour d'honneur and the palace front

- Location within Gelderland

General information
- Type: Palace
- Architectural style: Dutch Baroque
- Location: Apeldoorn, Netherlands, Koninklijk Park 1
- Coordinates: 52.234167°N 5.945833°E
- Construction started: 1684
- Completed: 1686
- Renovated: 1976–1982
- Client: William III of England; Mary II of England
- Owner: Dutch state

Technical details
- Floor area: 36,042 m^{2} (387,950 sq ft)

Design and construction
- Architects: Jacob Roman; Johan van Swieten; Daniel Marot

Het Loo Palace (Dutch: Paleis Het Loo [paːˈlɛis ɦɛt ˈloː], meaning "The Lea") is a palace in Apeldoorn, Netherlands, which was built by the House of Orange-Nassau.

== History ==
The symmetrical Dutch Baroque building was designed by Jacob Roman and Johan van Swieten. It was built between 1684 and 1686 for stadtholder William III and II and Mary II, joint monarchs of England, Ireland and Scotland. The garden was designed by Claude Desgots.

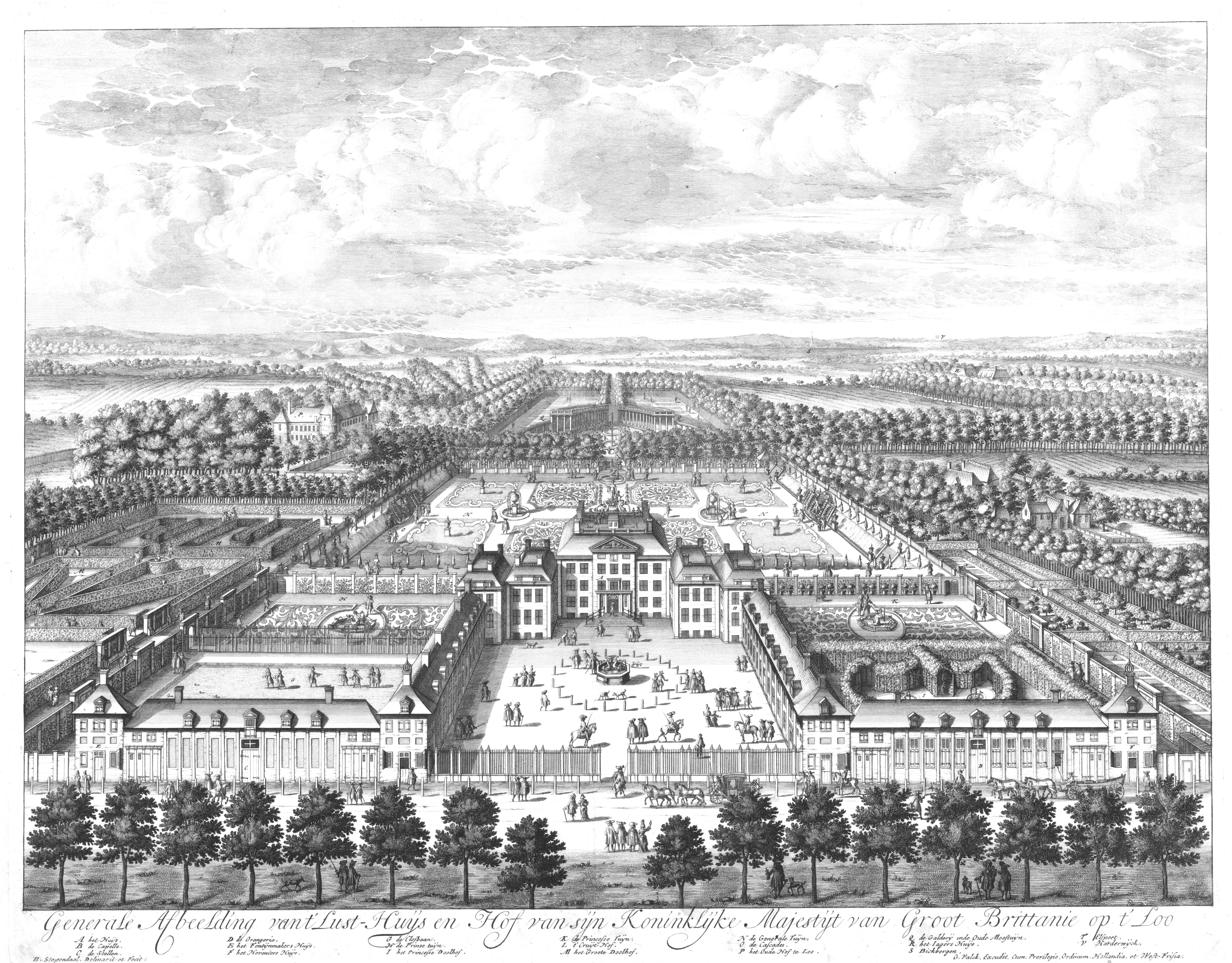
Het Loo and its gardens, in a late-17th-century engraving

After the elder House of Orange-Nassau had become extinct with the death of William III in 1702, he left all his estates in the Netherlands to his cousin John William Friso of the House of Nassau-Dietz in his will. However, Frederick I of Prussia claimed them, as he also descended from the princes of Orange, and the Houses of Orange-Nassau and Hohenzollern had, a few generations before, made an inheritance contract. Therefore, most of the older properties, although not including Het Loo, were in fact taken over by the Hohenzollerns, who never lived there. John William Friso's son, William IV, Prince of Orange, finally took over Het Loo and Soestdijk Palace, as well as Huis ten Bosch near The Hague. His widow later bought back several of the older properties in and around The Hague from Frederick William I of Prussia in 1732.

Het Loo was much beloved by King William I, who remained its owner after he abdicated in the fall of 1840. A few years before, the king had permitted the ancient practice of falconry to be reinstated on the palace grounds. His grandsons William III and Alexander became enthusiastic members of the Royal Loo Hawking Club, the latter serving as President from 1840 until his death in 1848. The falconry season drew a crowd of hunting enthusiasts to Het Loo every spring, including British noblemen such as the 7th Duke of Leeds. They stayed at hotels in Apeldoorn and held their meetings at Het Oude Loo in the vicinity of the palace. After Prince Alexander's death in 1848, the club quickly went into decline. It was abolished in 1855. King William III made an effort to keep the practice of falconry alive for a while afterwards, paying a falconer from his private funds. Like his grandfather, he loved Het Loo and gladly spent much of his time living there as a country gentleman. William III, who was suffering from a kidney ailment, spent his last months at Het Loo and died there in November 1890.

The palace remained a summer residence of the House of Orange-Nassau until the death of Queen Wilhelmina in 1962. In 1960, Queen Wilhelmina had declared that when she died, the private estate surrounding the palace would go to the Dutch state. She did, however, request that it should be returned to her family if the Dutch were to abolish the monarchy. The former crown properties surrounding the palace became property of the Dutch state in 1962, after Wilhelmina died at Het Loo. Her daughter, Queen Juliana, never lived there, but her younger daughter, Princess Margriet, lived in the right wing until 1975.

The building was renovated between 1976 and 1982. Since 1984, the palace has been a state museum open to the general public, showing interiors with original furniture, objects and paintings of the House of Orange-Nassau. It also houses a library devoted to the House of Orange-Nassau and the Museum van de Kanselarij der Nederlandse Orden (Museum of the Netherlands Orders of Knighthood's Chancellery), with books and other material concerning decorations and medals. The building is a rijksmonument and is among the Top 100 Dutch heritage sites.

== Architecture ==
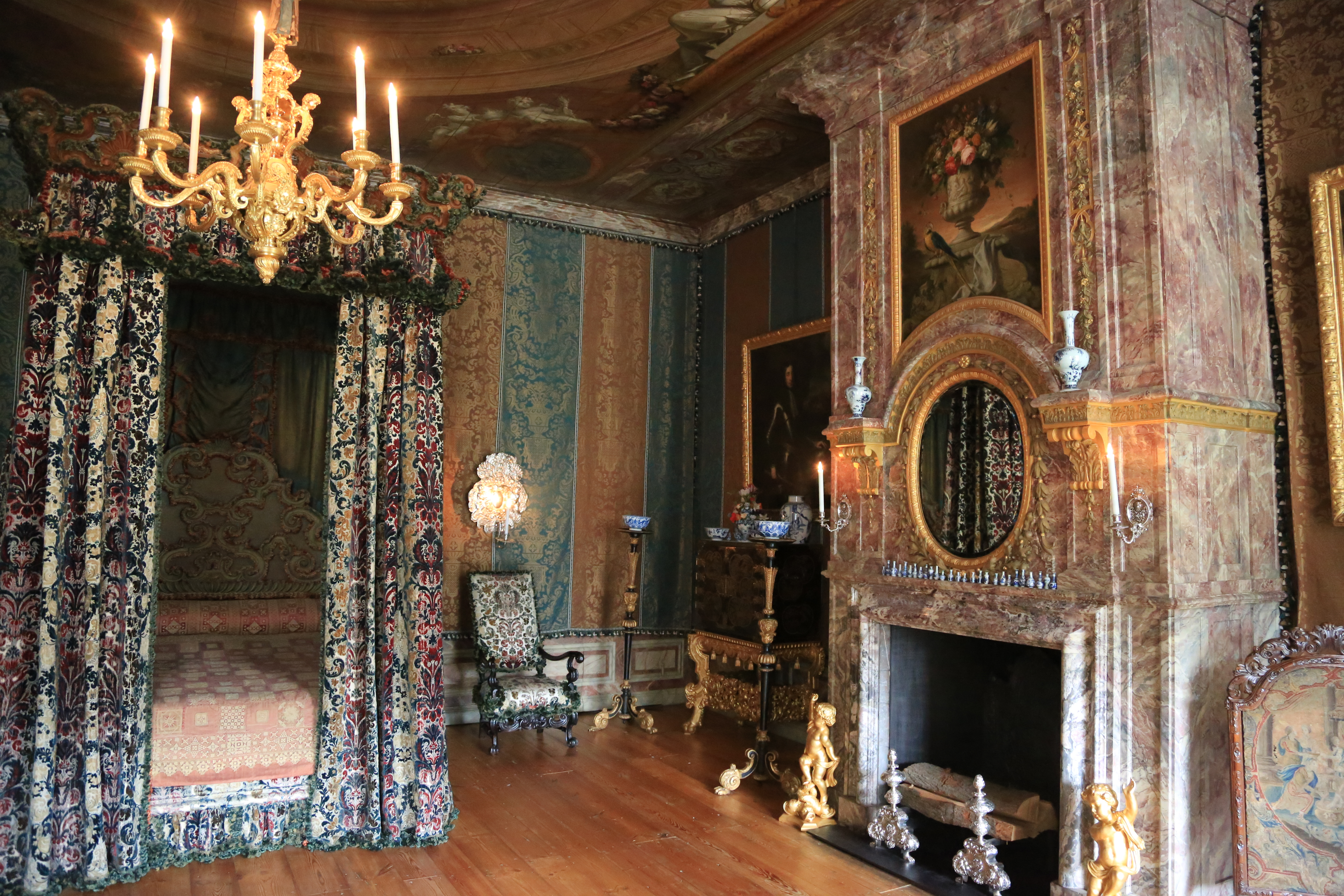
Mary II's bedroom

The Dutch Baroque architecture of Het Loo takes pains to minimize the grand stretch of its construction, so emphatic at Versailles, and present itself as just a fine gentleman's residence. Het Loo is not a formal palace but, as the title of its engraved illustration (see image) states, a "Lust-hof" (a retreat, or "pleasure house"). Nevertheless, it is situated entre cour et jardin ("between courtyard and garden") like Versailles and its imitators, and even as fine Parisian private houses are. The dry paved and gravelled courtyard, lightly screened from the road by a wrought-iron grille, is domesticated by a traditional plat of box-bordered green, the homely touch of a cross in a circle one might find in a bourgeois garden. The volumes of the palace are rhythmically broken in their massing. They work down symmetrically, expressing the subordinate roles of their use and occupants, and the final outbuildings in Marot's plan extend along the public thoroughfare, like a well-made and delightfully ordinary street.

In 2016, an international public competition was held concerning the renovation and extension of the house and the main courtyard. KAAN Architecten's winning proposal, which opens to the public in April 2023, adds over 5000 square meters of new facilities and amenities, all placed underground and within the existing wings. The grass and gravel courtyard has been replaced with a large central fountain and skylight to a large Grand Foyer where visitors can access the main house from new grand staircases as well as new temporary exhibit galleries.

== Garden ==
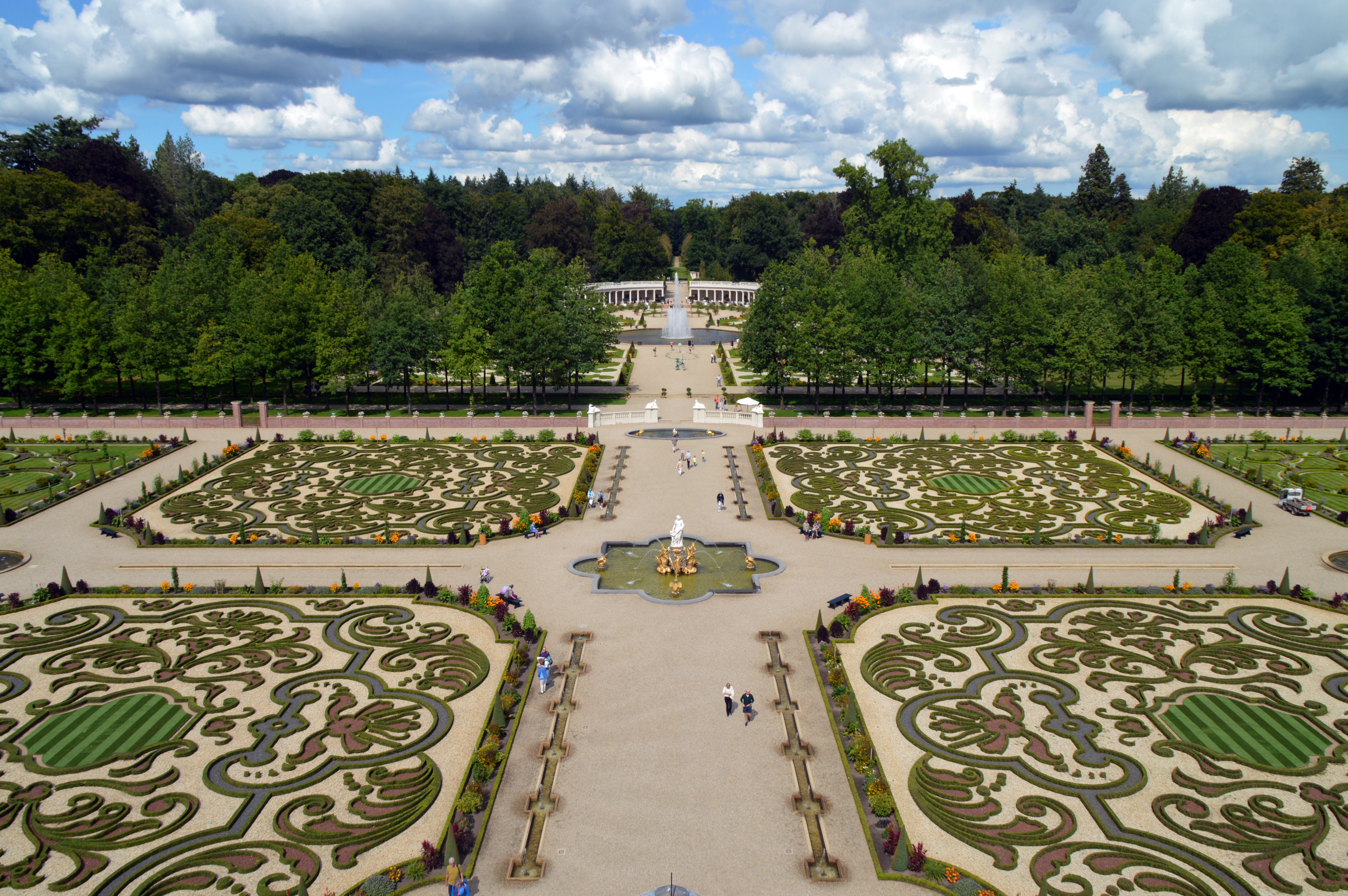
Photograph of the gardens, restored according to Desgots's design

The private "Great Garden" is situated behind the house. This Dutch Baroque garden, often nicknamed the "Versailles of Holland", actually serves to show more differences than similarities. It is still within the general Baroque formula established by André Le Nôtre: perfect symmetry, axial layout radiating gravel walks, parterres with fountains, basins and statues.

The garden as it appears in the engraving was designed by Le Nôtre's nephew, Claude Desgots. Throughout his military and diplomatic career, William of Orange was the continental antagonist of Louis XIV, the commander of the forces opposed to those of absolute power and Roman Catholicism. André Le Nôtre's main axis at Versailles, continued by the canal, runs up to the horizon. Daniel Marot and Desgots's Het Loo garden does not dominate the landscape as Louis's German imitators do, though in his idealized plan, Desgots extends the axis. The main garden, with conservative rectangular beds instead of more elaborately shaped ones, is an enclosed space surrounded by raised walks, as a Renaissance garden might be, tucked into the woods for private enjoyment, the garden not of a king but of a stadtholder. At its far end a shaded crosswalk of trees disguised the central vista. The orange trees set out in wooden boxes and wintered in an orangery, which were a feature of all gardens, did double duty for the House of Orange-Nassau.

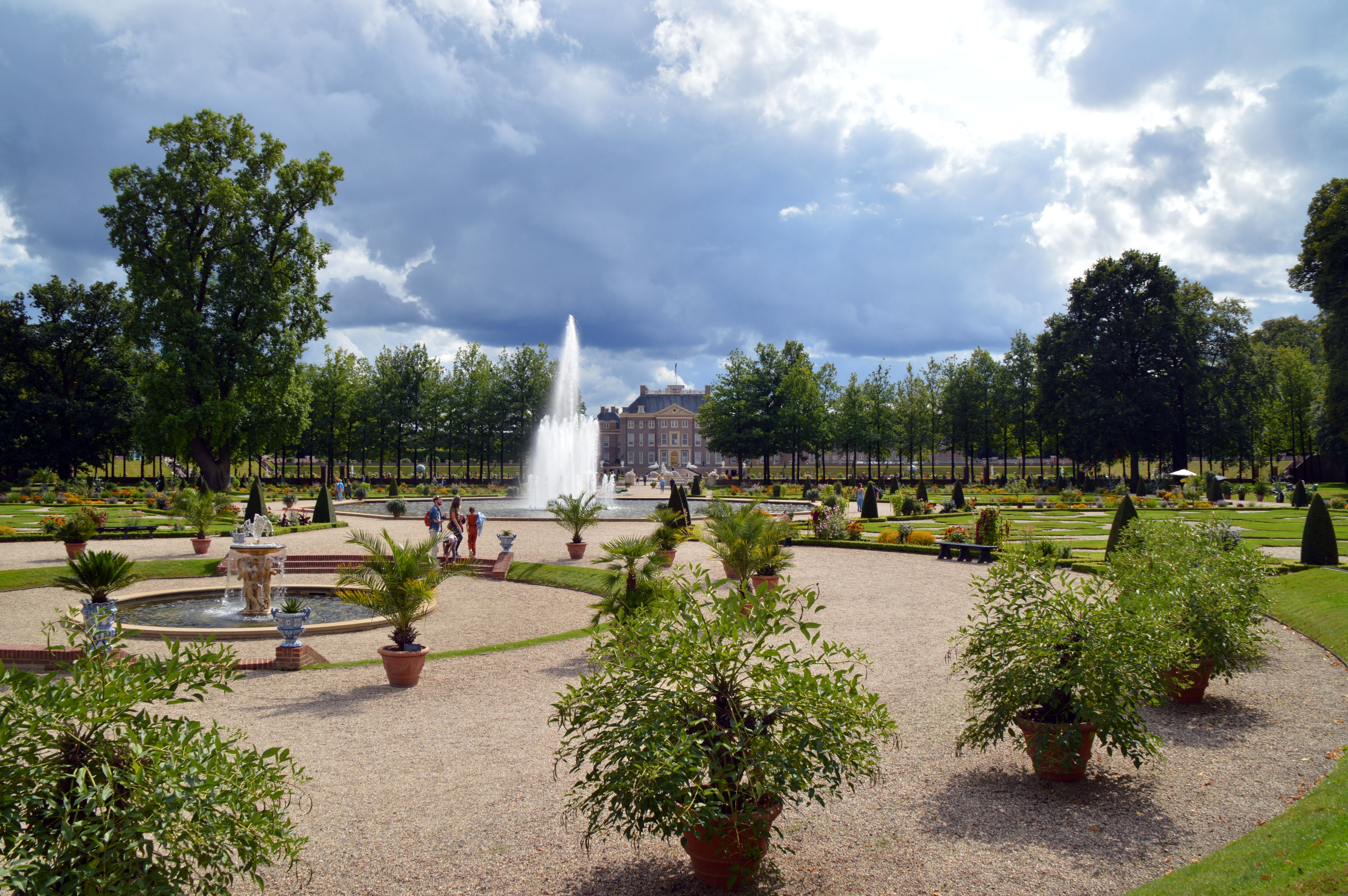
The palace, seen from the gardens

Outside the garden there are a few straight scenic avenues, for following the hunt in a carriage, or purely for the vista afforded by an avenue. Few of the "green rooms" cut into the woodlands in imitation of the cabinets de verdure of Versailles that are shown in the engraving were ever actually executed at Het Loo.

The patron of the Sun King's garden was Apollo. Peter the Great would opt for Samson, springing the jaws of Sweden's heraldic lion. William opted for Hercules.

In the 18th century, William III's Baroque garden as seen in the engraving was replaced by an English landscape garden.

The lost gardens of Het Loo were fully restored beginning in 1970 and completed in time to celebrate the building's 1984 tercentenary. Het Loo's new brickwork, latticework and ornaments are as raw as they must have been in 1684 and will mellow with time.

== Het Loo House ==
Het Loo House was built in the palace grounds in 1975, as a home for Princess Margriet and Mr Pieter van Vollenhoven. It is largely single-storey and in a modern style of its time.

== Visitors ==
The museum had 249,435 visitors in 2012 and 410,000 visitors in 2013. It was the 8th most visited museum in the Netherlands in 2013. The museum's stable yard has a coach house with royal carriages and sleighs on display.

== Gallery ==
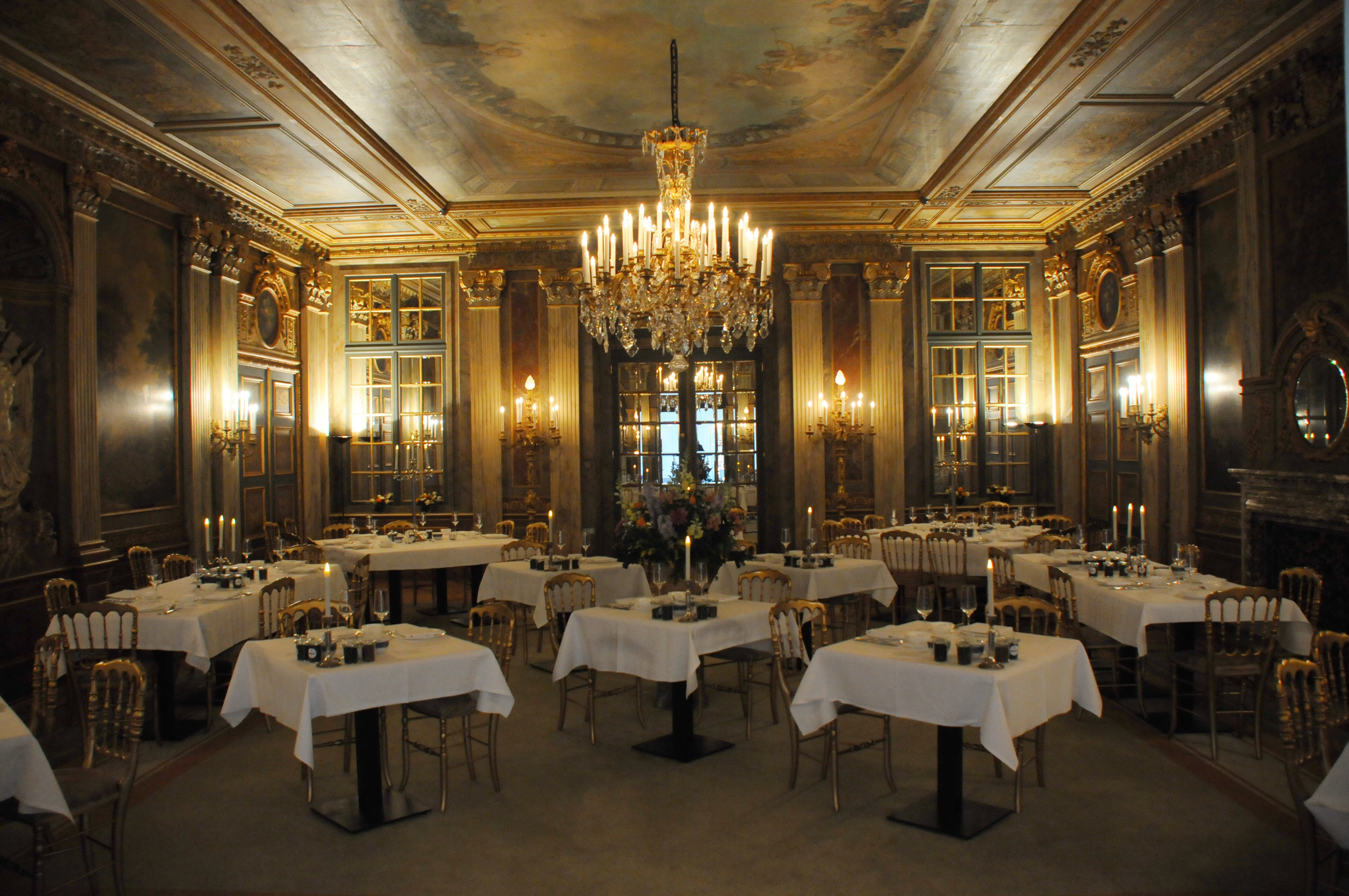
Dinner room

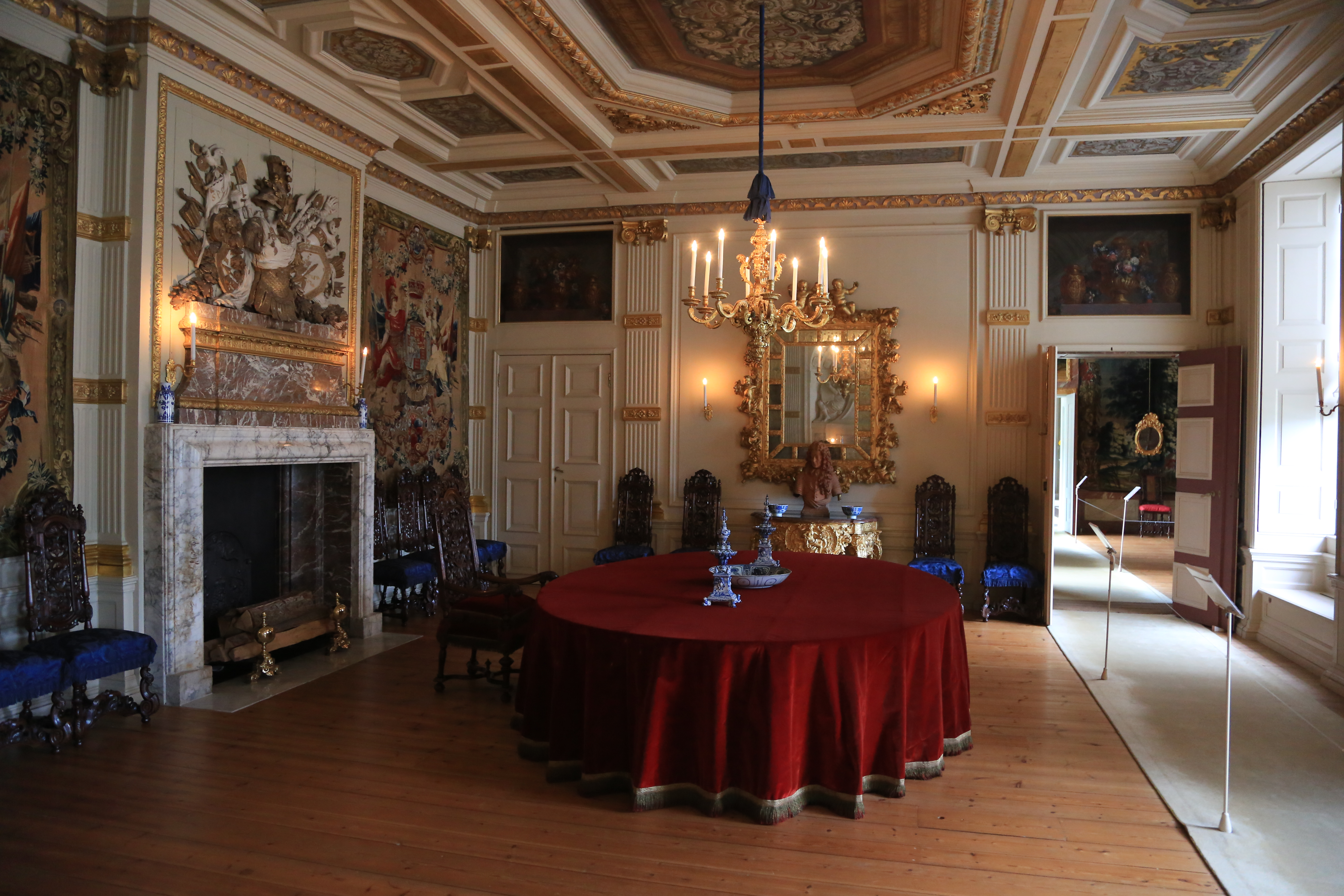
The new dining room

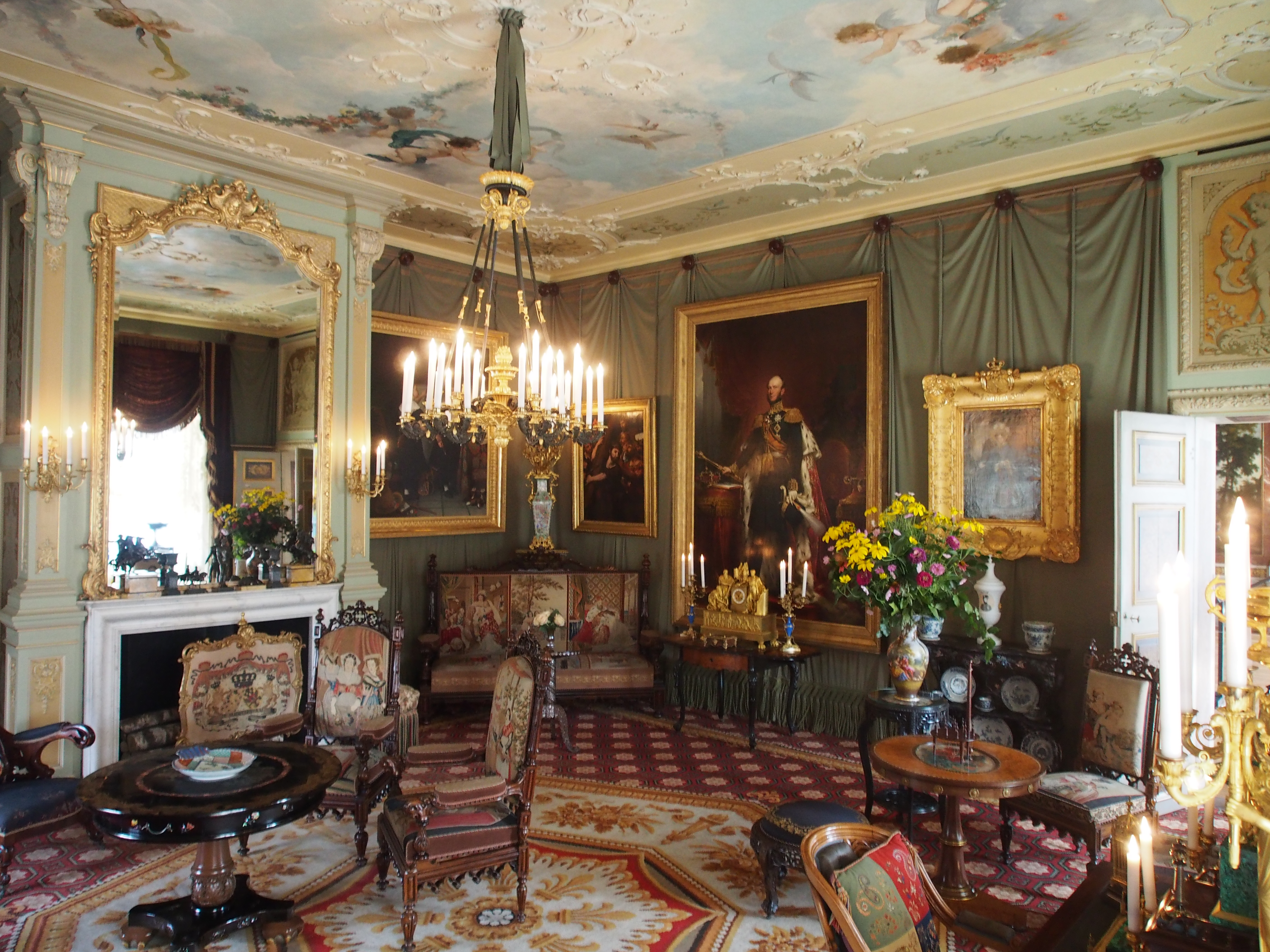

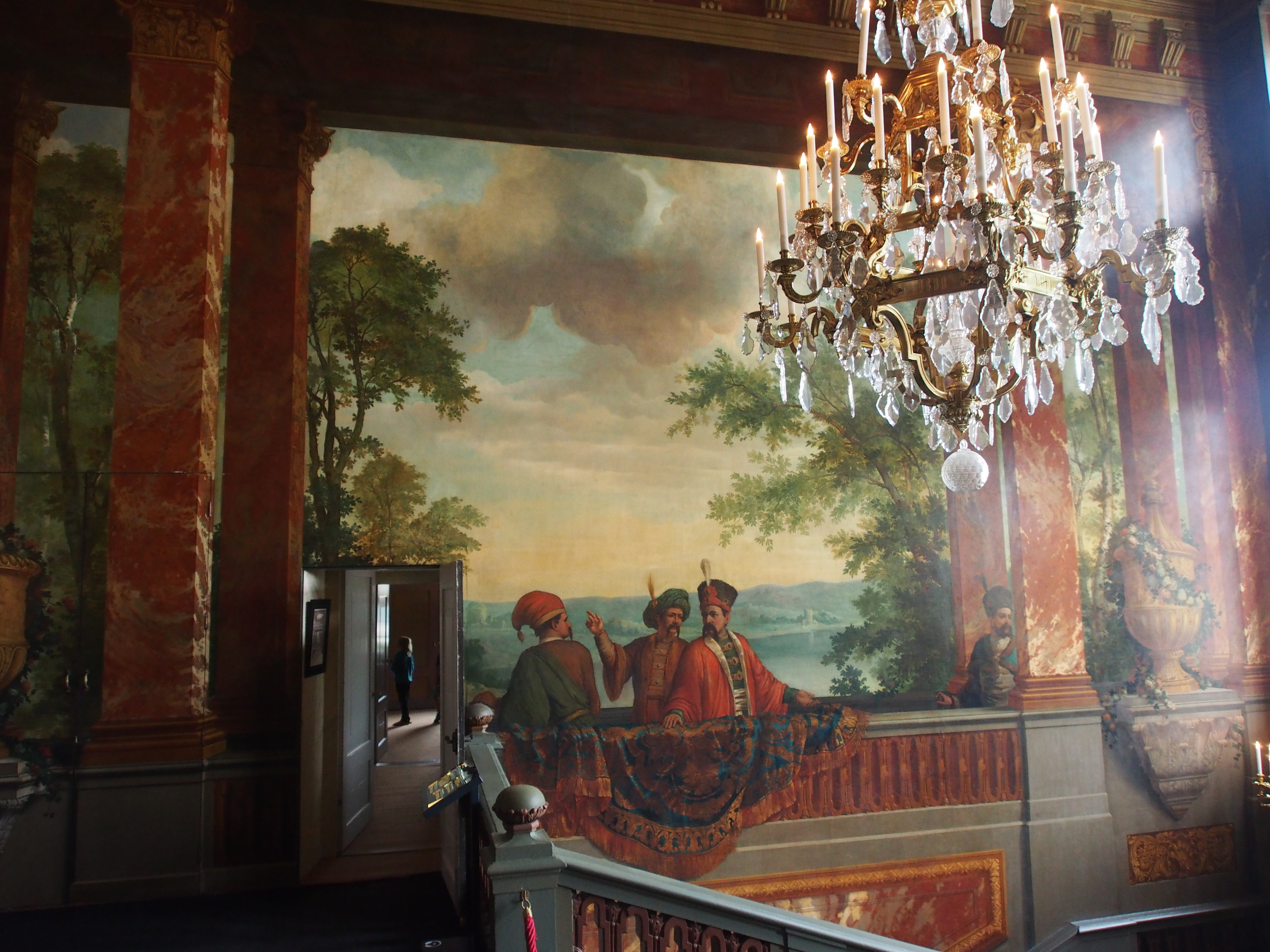
The main staircase

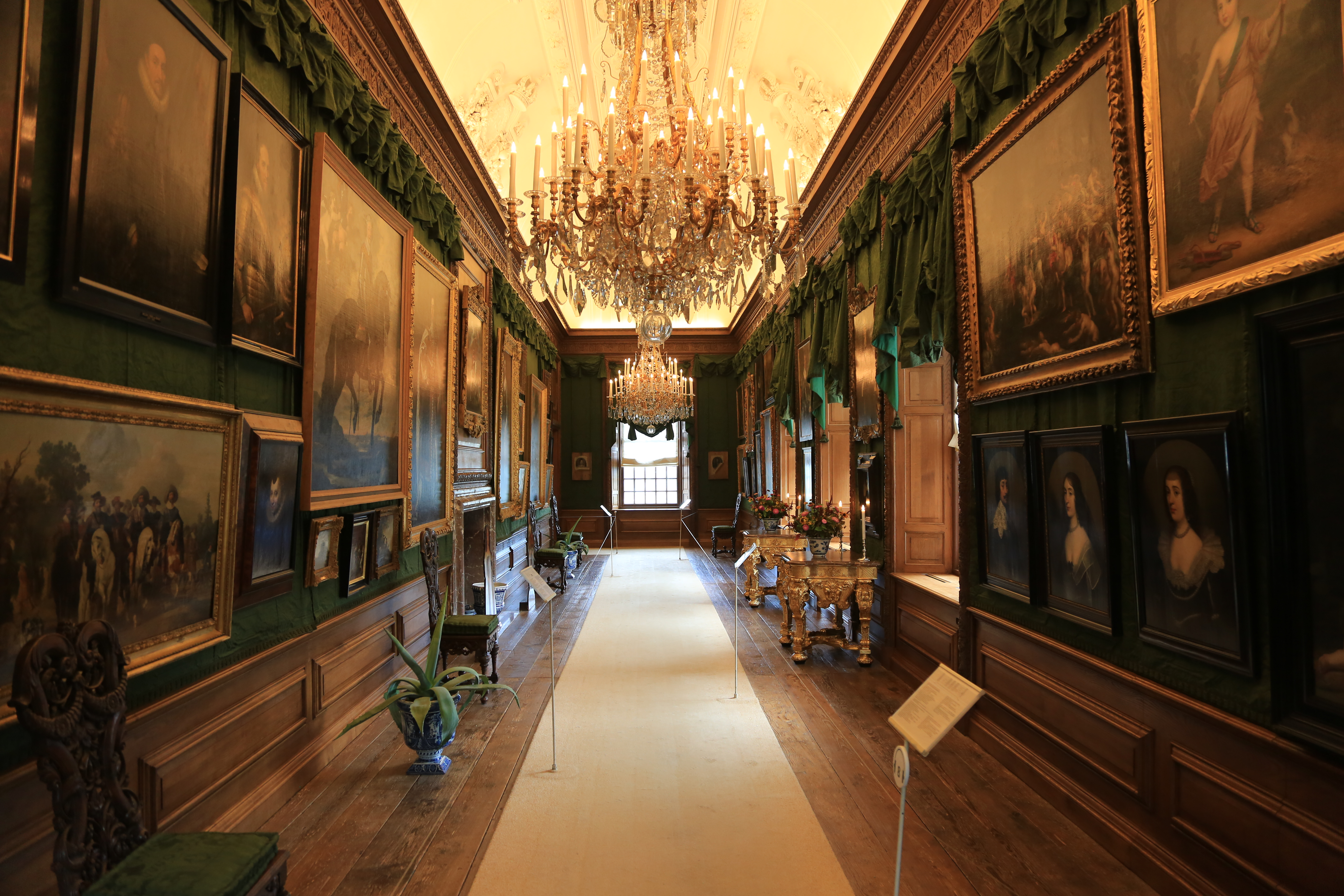
The gallery

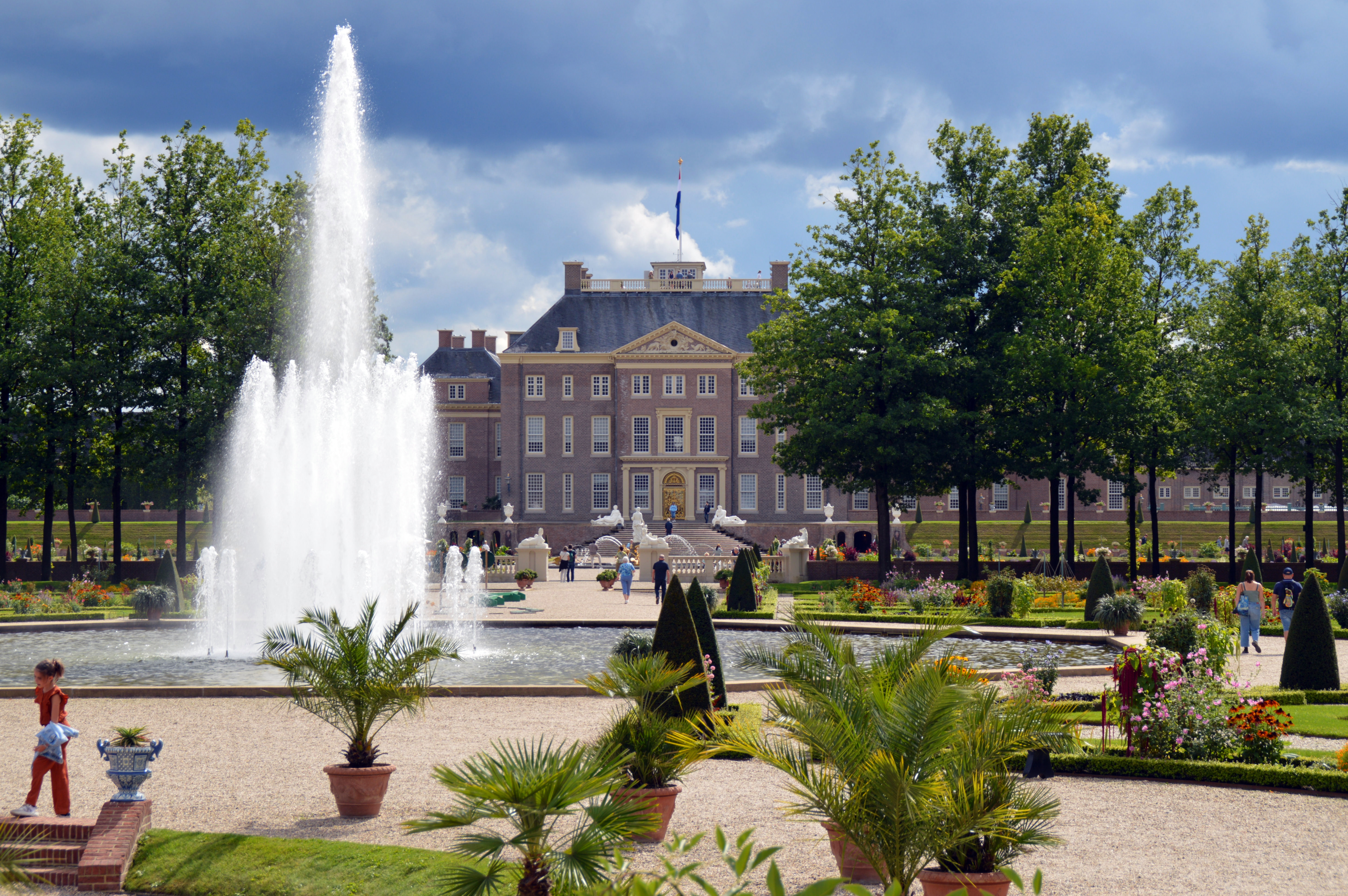
The back of the palace

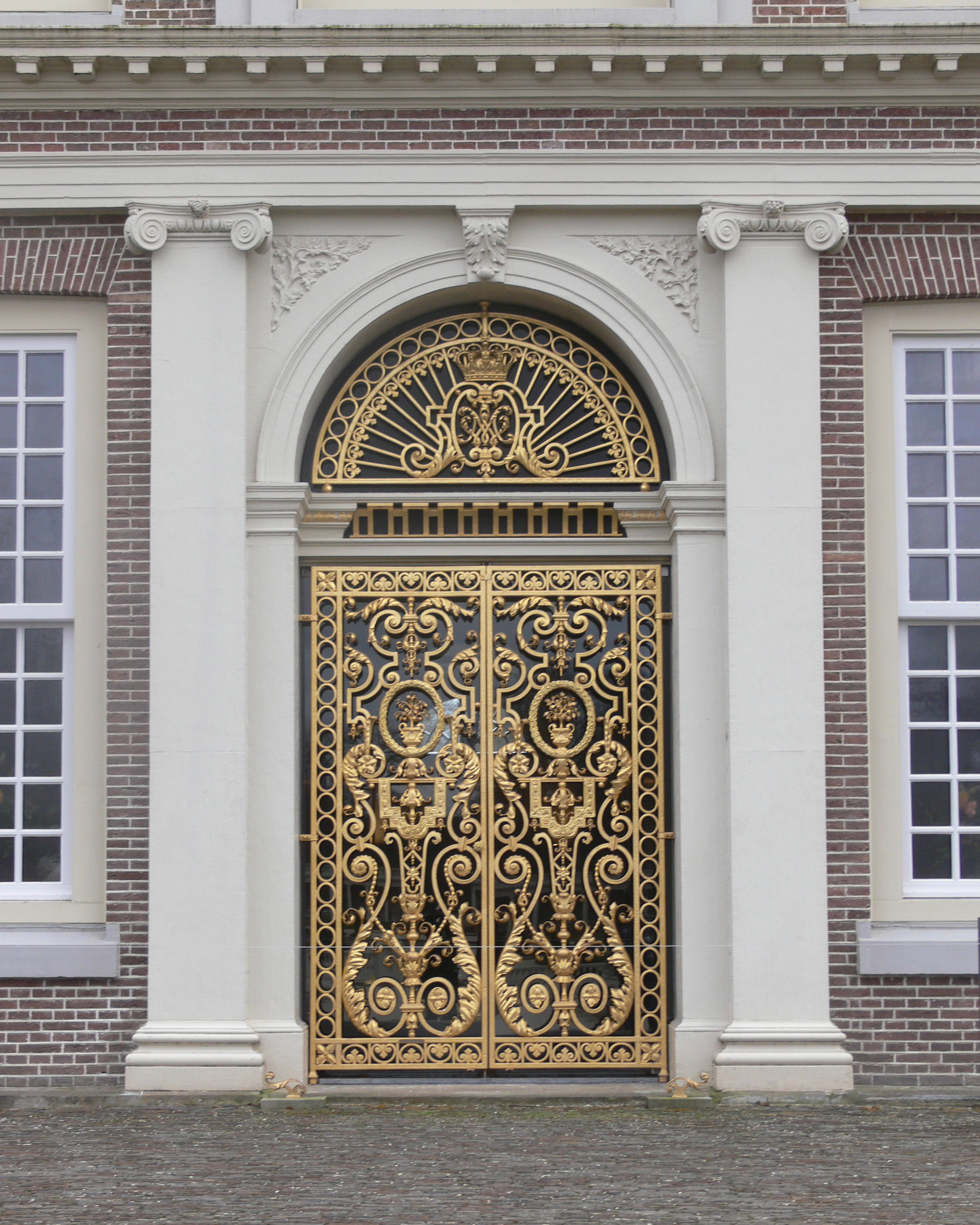
The back door

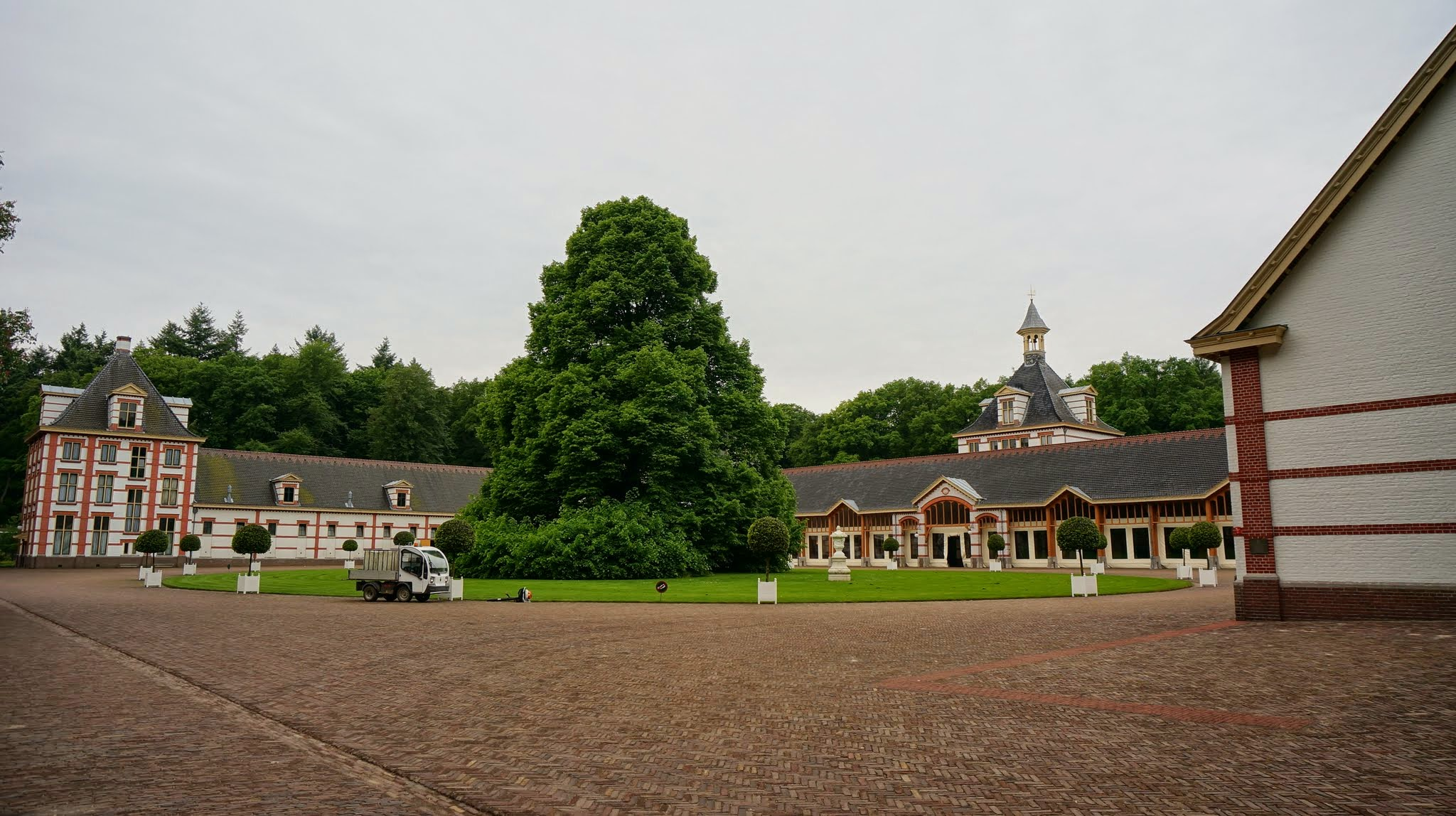
Royal Stables

== See also ==
- List of Baroque residences
- De Naald – a monument near Het Loo
- Het Oude Loo
- Hampton Court Palace in England
